= List of compositions by Robert Schumann =

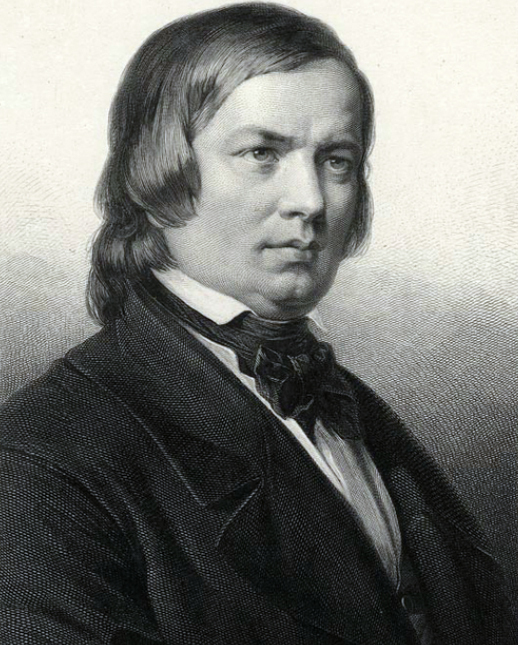
Robert Schumann

This list of compositions by Robert Schumann is classified into piano, vocal, orchestral and chamber works. All works are also listed separately, by opus number.

Schumann wrote almost exclusively for the piano until 1840, when he burst into song composition around the time of his marriage to Clara Wieck. Partly due to Clara Schumann's encouragement, he then expanded his oeuvre to orchestral works, composing the 1st symphony, the 4th symphony, and the Overture, Scherzo and Finale Op. 52 in the year of 1841. The next year, 1842, is known as 'the year of chamber works,' where he notably composed 3 String Quartets, a Piano Quintet, and a Piano Quartet. Robert Schumann is known as one of the most prolific composers in the Romantic era, producing multiple works for multiple instruments, forms, and genres (both absolute and program music).

The list is based on lists of his works, such as in the 2001 biography by Eric Frederick Jensen.

== Piano works ==
- Op. 1, Variations on the name "Abegg" (1830)
- Op. 2, Papillons (1829–1831)
- Op. 3, Études after Paganini Caprices (1832)
- Op. 4, Intermezzi (1832)
- Op. 5, Impromptus on a Theme by Clara Wieck (1833, rev. 1850)
- Op. 6, Davidsbündlertänze (1837)
- Op. 7, Toccata in C major (1832)
- Op. 8, Allegro in B minor (1831)
- Op. 9, Carnaval (1834–1835)
- Op. 10, 6 Concert Studies on Caprices by Paganini (1833)
- Op. 11, Piano Sonata No. 1 in F♯ minor (1833–35)
- Op. 12, Fantasiestücke, Op. 12 (Fantasy Pieces) (1837)
- Op. 13, Symphonic Studies (Études symphoniques) (1834)
- Op. 14, Piano Sonata No. 3 in F minor, (1836, rev. 1853)
- Op. 15, Kinderszenen (Scenes From Childhood) (1838)
- Op. 16, Kreisleriana (1838, rev. 1850)
- Op. 17, Fantasie in C (1836, rev. 1839)
- Op. 18, Arabeske in C (1839)
- Op. 19, Blumenstück (Flower Piece) in D♭ (1839)
- Op. 20, Humoreske in B♭ (1839)
- Op. 21, Novelletten (Novelettes) (1838)
- Op. 22, Piano Sonata No. 2 in G minor (1833–1835, rev. 1838)
- Op. 23, Nachtstücke (Night Pieces) (1839)
- Op. 26, Faschingsschwank aus Wien (Carnival Jest from Vienna) (1839)
- Op. 28, Three Romances (1839)
- Op. 32, Four Klavierstücke (Scherzo, Gigue, Romance and Fughette) (1838–9)
- Op. 46, Andante and variations for two pianos (1843) (also see WoO 10)
- Op. 56, Studies in the Form of Canons for Organ or Pedal Piano (Etuden in kanonischer Form für Orgel oder Pedalklavier) (1845; also known in arrangements for piano trio)
- Op. 58, Sketches for Organ or Pedal Piano (Skizzen für Orgel oder Pedalklavier) (1845)
- Op. 60, 6 Fugues on B–A–C–H for organ or pedal piano (1845)
- Op. 66, Bilder aus Osten (Pictures from the East), 6 Impromptus for piano 4-hands (1848)
- Op. 68, Album for the Young (Album für die Jugend) (1848)
- Op. 72, Four Fugues (Vier Fugen) (1845)
- Op. 76, Four Marches (Vier Märsche) (1849)
- Op. 82, Waldszenen (Forest Scenes) (1848–1849)
- Op. 85, 12 Piano Pieces for Young and Older Children (12 Klavierstücke für kleine und große Kinder) (piano 4-hands) (1849)
- Op. 99, Bunte Blätter ("Coloured Leaves") (1836–1849)
- Op. 109, Ball-Scenen (Scenes from a Ball) (piano 4-hands) (1851)
- Op. 111, Three Fantasiestücke (1851)
- Op. 118, Drei Sonaten für die Jugend (Three Piano Sonatas for the Young) (1853)
- Op. 124, Albumblätter (Album Leaves) (1832–1845) (includes one piece previously part of WoO 31)
- Op. 126, Seven Piano Pieces in Fughetta Form (1853)
- Op. 130, Children's Ball (Kinderball) (piano 4-hands) (1853)
- Op. 133, Gesänge der Frühe (Songs of Dawn) (1853)
- WoO 4, Canon für Alexis
- WoO 5, Scherzo (rejected from Op. 14) & Presto passionato (original finale of Op. 22)
- WoO 6, Supplementary Variations to Symphonic Etudes Op. 13 (1837)
- WoO 16, Additional pieces to Album für die Jugend Op. 68 (1848)
- WoO 20, Eight Polonaises (piano 4-hands) (1828)
- WoO 24, Variations in E♭ on an Original Theme (Geistervariationen) (1854)
- WoO 28, Supplement to the Op. 12 Fantasiestücke (1837)
- WoO 30, Additional pieces to Album für die Jugend Op. 68 (1848)
- WoO 31, Studies in the Form of Free Variations on a Theme by Beethoven (1831–32)
- Posth., 5 Short Pieces (Notturnino, Ballo, Burla, Capriccio, Écossaise) (nos. 1, 4 & 5 unfinished)
- Posth., Romanza in F major (unfinished)
- Posth., Hasche Mann

== Lieder ==
=== For Solo Voice and Piano ===
- Op. 24, Liederkreis (Heine), 9 songs (1839)
- Op. 25, Myrthen, 26 songs (4 books) (1840)
- Op. 27, Lieder und Gesänge volume I (5 songs) (1840)
- Op. 30, 3 Gedichte of E. Geibel (1840)
- Op. 31, 3 Gesänge of A. Chamisso (1840)
- Op. 35, 12 Gedichte von Justinus Kerner, a song series (1840)
- Op. 36, 6 Gedichte on Reinick's Liederbuche eines Malers (1840)
- Op. 37, 12 Gedichte on F. Rückert's Liebesfrühling (Nos. 2, 4 and 11 are by Clara Schumann) (1840)
- Op. 39, Liederkreis (Eichendorff), twelve songs (1840)
- Op. 40, 5 Lieder (1840)
- Op. 42, Frauen-Liebe und Leben (Chamisso), eight songs (1840)
- Op. 45, Romanzen & Balladen volume I (3 songs) (1840)
- Op. 48, Song cycle, Dichterliebe, sixteen songs from Heine's Buch der Lieder (1840)
- Op. 49, Romanzen & Balladen volume II (3 songs) (1840)
- Op. 51, Lieder und Gesänge volume II (5 songs) (1842)
- Op. 53, Romanzen & Balladen volume III (3 songs) (1840)
- Op. 57, Belsatzar, ballad (Heine) (1840)
- Op. 64, Romanzen & Balladen volume IV (3 songs) (1841–47)
- Op. 77, Lieder und Gesänge volume III (5 songs) (1841–50)
- Op. 79, Liederalbum für die Jugend (29 songs) (1849)
- Op. 83, 3 Gesänge (1850)
- Op. 87, Ballad, "Der Handschuh" (Schiller) (1850)
- Op. 89, 6 Gesänge of W. von der Neun (1850)
- Op. 90, 6 Gedichte of N. Lenau and Requiem (1850)
- Op. 95, 3 Gesänge on Hebrew Melodies of Lord Byron (1849)
- Op. 96, Lieder und Gesänge volume IV (1850)
- Op. 98a, Lieder und Gesänge from Goethe's Wilhelm Meister (1849)
- Op. 104, 7 Lieder of Elisabeth Kulman (1851)
- Op. 107, 6 Gesänge (1851–52)
- Op. 117, 4 Husarenlieder of N. Lenau (for baritone) (1851)
- Op. 119, 3 Gedichte from Die Waldlieder of S. Pfarrius (1851)
- Op. 125, 5 heitere Gesänge (1851)
- Op. 127, 5 Lieder und Gesänge (1850–51)
- Op. 135, Gedichte der Königin Maria Stuart: from a collection of Old-English Poems (1852)
- Op. posth. 142, 4 Gesänge (1852)

=== For Multiple Voices and Piano ===
- Op. 29, 3 Gedichte of E. Geibel (for mixed voices and piano) (1840)
- Op. 34, 4 Duets (for soprano, tenor, and piano) (1840)
- Op. 43, 3 Duets (1840)
- Op. 74, Spanisches Liederspiel: A Song-Cycle on Spanish Folksongs and Romances (for solo and mixed SATB voices, and piano) (1849)
- Op. 78, 4 duets (for soprano, tenor and piano) (1849)
- Op. 101, Minnespiel on F. Rückert's Liebesfrühling (for solo and mixed SATB voices, and piano) (1849)
- Op. 103, Mädchenlieder of Elisabeth Kulman (for 2 sopranos and piano) (1851)
- Op. 114, 3 Lieder (for 3 female voices and piano) (1853)
- Op. posth. 138, Spanische Liebeslieder: A Song-Cycle in 2 Parts on Spanish Folksongs and Romances (for solo and mixed SATB voices, and piano 4-hands) (1849)

=== Declamations ===
- Op. 106, Declamation with piano, "Schön Hedwig" (1849)
- Op. 122, Declamation with piano: "Ballade vom Heideknaben" and "Die Flüchtlinge" (1852)

== Choral Works ==
=== Lieder for Unaccompanied Chorus ===
- Op. 33, 6 Lieder (for men's choir) (1840)
- Op. 55, 5 Lieder of R. Burns (1846)
- Op. 59, 4 Gesänge (1846)
- Op. 62, 3 Lieder (for men's choir) (1847)
- Op. 65, Ritornelle in canonischen Weisen of F. Ruckert (for male soloists and men's choir) (1847)
- Op. 67, Romanzen & Balladen volume I (1849)
- Op. 69, Romanzen volume I (for women's choir with piano ad lib) (1849)
- Op. 75, Romanzen & Balladen volume II (1849)
- Op. 91, Romanzen volume II (for women's chorus with piano ad lib) (1849)
- Op. posth. 137, Jagdlieder: 5 Songs from H. Laube's Jagdbrevier (for men's choir with 4 horns ad lib) (1849)
- Op. posth. 141, 4 Gesänge (for double chorus) (1849)
- Op. posth. 145, Romanzen & Balladen Vol. III (1849–51)
- Op. posth. 146, Romanzen & Balladen Vol. IV (1849)

=== Lieder for Chorus and Orchestra ===
- Op. 71, Adventlied for soprano, chorus and orchestra (1848)
- Op. 84, Beim Abschied zu singen for chorus & winds (1848)
- Op. 98b, Requiem for Mignon for solo voices, chorus and orchestra (1849)
- Op. 108, Nachtlied for chorus and orchestra (1849)
- Op. 123, Festival Overture with song on the Rheinweinlied for orchestra and chorus (1853)
- Op. posth. 144, "Neujahrslied" for chorus and orchestra (1849–50)

=== Large-Scale Choral Works ===
- Op. 50, Das Paradies und die Peri, oratorio (1841–43)
- Op. 93, Verzweifle nicht im Schmerzenstal: Motet by Friedrich Rückert after Abu Mohammed al Kasim Harîrî (1849 for unaccompanied male double choir, 1850 with organ accompaniment, 1852 with orchestral accompaniment and organ ad lib)
- Op. 112, Der Rose Pilgerfahrt: Fairy tale by Moritz Horn (1851)
- Op. 116, Der Königssohn: Ballade by Ludwig Uhland (1851)
- Op. posth. 139, Des Sängers Fluch: Ballade by Ludwig Uhland (1852)
- Op. posth. 140, Vom Pagen und der Königstochter: Ballade by Emanuel Geibel (1852)
- Op. posth. 143, Das Glück von Edenhall: Ballade by Ludwig Uhland (1853)
- WoO 3, Scenes from Goethe's Faust
  - Faust's Verklärung from Faust, Part II (1844–1847)
  - Four Scenes from Faust, Parts I & II (1849)
  - Two Scenes from Faust, Part II (1850)
  - Faust Overture (1853)

=== Sacred Choral Works ===
- Op. posth. 147, Missa sacra (1852)
- Op. posth. 148, Requiem (1852)

== Dramatic Works ==
- Op. 81, Genoveva, opera (1844–1848)
- Op. 115, Manfred: Overture and incidental music, (1848–49)

== Orchestral works ==
=== Symphonies ===
Number	Key	Opus	Year	Incipit
"Zwickau"	G minor	WoO 29	1832/33 (incomplete)	
1 "Spring"	B♭ major	Op. 38	1841	
2	C major	Op. 61	1846	
3 "Rhenish"	E♭ major	Op. 97	1850	
4	D minor	Op. 120	1841 (revised in 1851)	

=== Overtures ===
- Op. 52, Overture, Scherzo and Finale in E major (1841)
- Op. 115, Manfred (1848–49)
- Op. 100, The Bride of Messina (1850–51)
- Op. 128, Julius Caesar (1851)
- Op. posth. 136, Hermann and Dorothea (1851)

=== Works for solo instrument(s) with orchestra ===
- Op. 54, Piano Concerto in A minor (1841–45)
- Op. 86, Konzertstück for Four Horns and Orchestra (1849)
- Op. 92, Introduction and Allegro appassionato for Piano and Orchestra (1849)
- Op. 129, Cello Concerto in A minor (1850)
- Op. 131, Fantasy in C for Violin and Orchestra (1853)
- Op. 134, Concert Allegro with Introduction for Piano and Orchestra (1853)
- WoO 23, Violin Concerto in D minor (1853)

== Chamber works ==
- Op. 41, Three String Quartets in A minor, F and A (1842)
- Op. 44, Piano Quintet in E♭ (1842)
- Op. 46, Andante and variations in B♭ (1843)
- Op. 47, Piano Quartet in E♭ (1842)
- Op. 63, Piano Trio No. 1 in D minor (1847)
- Op. 70, Adagio and Allegro for Horn (or Violin) and Piano (1849)
- Op. 73, Fantasiestücke for Clarinet (or Violin) and Piano (1849)
- Op. 80, Piano Trio No. 2 in F (1847)
- Op. 88, Fantasiestücke for piano trio (1842)
- Op. 94, Three Romances for Oboe (or Violin, or Clarinet) and Piano (1849)
- Op. 102, 5 Stücke im Volkston for Cello (or Violin) and Piano (1849)
- Op. 105, Violin Sonata No. 1 in A minor (1851)
- Op. 110, Piano Trio No. 3 in G minor (1851)
- Op. 113, Märchenbilder, for Viola (or Violin) and Piano (1851)
- Op. 121, Violin Sonata No. 2 in D minor (1851)
- Op. 132, Märchenerzählungen, for Clarinet (or Violin), Viola and Piano (1853)
- WoO 10, Andante and variations for two pianos, two cellos and horn (1843) (original version of Op. 46, arranged for two pianos)
- WoO 32, Piano quartet in C minor (1829)
- WoO 27, Violin Sonata No. 3 in A minor (1853)

== By opus number ==
Note that Opp. 1–23 are all written for piano solo.

- Op. 1, Variations on the name "Abegg" (1830)
- Op. 2, Papillons (1829–1831)
- Op. 3, Etudes After Paganini Caprices (1832)
- Op. 4, Intermezzi (1832)
- Op. 5, Impromptus [on a Theme by Clara Wieck] (1833)
- Op. 6, Davidsbündlertänze (1837)
- Op. 7, Toccata in C major (1832)
- Op. 8, Allegro in B minor (1831)
- Op. 9, Carnaval (1834–1835)
- Op. 10, 6 Concert Studies on Caprices by Paganini (1833)
- Op. 11, Piano Sonata No. 1 in F♯ minor (1835)
- Op. 12, Fantasiestücke, Op. 12 (Fantasy Pieces) (1837)
- Op. 13, Symphonic Studies (Études symphoniques) (1834)
- Op. 14, Piano Sonata No. 3 in F minor, Concerto Without Orchestra (1835)
- Op. 15, Kinderszenen (Scenes From Childhood) (1838)
- Op. 16, Kreisleriana (1838)
- Op. 17, Fantasie in C (1836, revised 1839)
- Op. 18, Arabeske in C (1839)
- Op. 19, Blumenstück (Flower Piece) in D♭ (1839)
- Op. 20, Humoreske in B♭ (1839)
- Op. 21, Novelletten (Novelettes) (1838)
- Op. 22, Piano Sonata No. 2 in G minor (1833–1835)
- Op. 23, Nachtstücke (Night Pieces) (1839)
- Op. 24, Liederkreis (Heine), nine songs (1840)
- Op. 25, Myrthen, twenty-six songs (4 books) (1840)
- Op. 26, Faschingsschwank aus Wien (Carnival Jest from Vienna) (1839), for piano
- Op. 27, Lieder und Gesänge volume I (5 songs) (1840)
- Op. 28, Three Romances (1839) for piano
- Op. 29, 3 Gedichte of E. Geibel (for mixed voices and piano) (1840)
- Op. 30, 3 Gedichte of E. Geibel (1840)
- Op. 31, 3 Gesänge of A. Chamisso (1840)
- Op. 32, 4 Klavierstücke (Scherzo, Gigue, Romance and Fughette) (1838–9)
- Op. 33, 6 Lieder (part songs for men's voices with piano ad lib) (1840)
- Op. 34, 4 Duets (for soprano and tenor, and piano) (1840)
- Op. 35, 12 Gedichte: A Song-Row of J. Kerner (1840)
- Op. 36, 6 Gedichte on Reinick's Liederbuche eines Malers (1840)
- Op. 37, 12 Gedichte on F. Rückert's Liebesfrühling (Nos. 2, 4 and 11 are by Clara Schumann) (1841)
- Op. 38, Symphony No. 1 in B♭, Spring (1841)
- Op. 39, Liederkreis (Eichendorff), twelve songs (1840)
- Op. 40, 5 Lieder (1840)
- Op. 41, Three String Quartets in A minor, F and A (1842)
- Op. 42, Frauenliebe und -leben (Chamisso), eight songs (1840)
- Op. 43, 3 Duets (1840)
- Op. 44, Piano Quintet in E♭ (1842)
- Op. 45, Romanzen & Balladen volume I (3 songs) (1840)
- Op. 46, Andante and variations for two pianos (1843) (also see WoO 10)
- Op. 47, Piano Quartet in E♭ (1842)
- Op. 48, Song cycle, Dichterliebe, sixteen songs from Heine's Buch der Lieder (1840)
- Op. 49, Romanzen & Balladen volume II (3 songs) (1840)
- Op. 50, Das Paradies und die Peri, oratorio (1841–43)
- Op. 51, Lieder und Gesänge volume II (5 songs) (1842)
- Op. 52, Overture, Scherzo and Finale in E (1841)
- Op. 53, Romanzen & Balladen volume III (3 songs) (1840)
- Op. 54, Piano Concerto in A minor (1841–45)
- Op. 55, 5 Lieder of R. Burns (for unaccompanied choir) (1846)
- Op. 56, Studies in the Form of Canons for Organ or Pedal Piano (Etuden in kanonischer Form für Orgel oder Pedalklavier) (1845)
- Op. 57, Belsatzar, ballad (Heine) (1840)
- Op. 58, Sketches for Organ or Pedal Piano (Skizzen für Orgel oder Pedalklavier) (1845)
- Op. 59, 4 Gesänge (for unaccompanied choir) (1846)
- Op. 60, 6 Fugues on B–A–C–H for organ or pedal piano (1845)
- Op. 61, Symphony No. 2 in C (1845–46)
- Op. 62, 3 Lieder (for unaccompanied men's choir) (1847)
- Op. 63, Piano Trio No. 1 in D minor (1847)
- Op. 64, Romanzen & Balladen volume IV (3 songs) (1841–47)
- Op. 65, Ritornelle in canonischen Weisen (7 canonic part songs) (1847)
- Op. 66, Bilder aus Osten (Pictures from the East), 6 Impromptus for piano 4-hands (1848)
- Op. 67, Romanzen & Balladen volume I (5 songs for unaccompanied chorus) (1849)
- Op. 68, Album for the Young (Album für die Jugend) (1848) for piano
- Op. 69, Romanzen volume I (6 songs for female chorus with piano ad lib) (1849)
- Op. 70, Adagio and Allegro for Horn and Piano (1849) (Schumann directed that the horn part could also be performed on violin or cello)
- Op. 71, Adventlied for soprano, chorus and orchestra (1848)
- Op. 72, Four Fugues (Vier Fugen) (1845) for piano
- Op. 73, Fantasiestücke for Clarinet and Piano (1849) (Schumann directed that the clarinet part could be also performed on violin or cello)
- Op. 74, Spanisches Liederspiel: A Song-Cycle on Spanish Folksongs and Romances (for solo and mixed SATB voices, and piano) (1849)
- Op. 75, Romanzen & Balladen volume II (5 songs for unaccompanied chorus) (1849)
- Op. 76, Four Marches (Vier Märsche) (1849) for piano
- Op. 77, Lieder und Gesänge volume III (5 songs) (1841–50)
- Op. 78, 4 duets (soprano and tenor) (1849)
- Op. 79, Liederalbum für die Jugend (29 songs) (1849)
- Op. 80, Piano Trio No. 2 in F (1847)
- Op. 81, Genoveva, opera (1844–1848)
- Op. 82, Waldszenen (Forest Scenes) (1848–1849) for piano
- Op. 83, 3 Gesänge (1850)
- Op. 84, Beim Abschied zu singen for chorus & winds (1848)
- Op. 85, 12 Piano Pieces for Young and Older Children (12 Klavierstücke für kleine und große Kinder) (piano 4-hands) (1849)
- Op. 86, Konzertstück for Four Horns and Orchestra (1849)
- Op. 87, Ballad, "Der Handschuh" (Schiller) (1850)
- Op. 88, Fantasiestücke for piano trio (1842)
- Op. 89, 6 Gesänge of W. von der Neun (1850)
- Op. 90, 6 Gedichte of N. Lenau and Requiem (1850)
- Op. 91, Romanzen volume II (6 songs for female chorus with piano ad lib) (1849)
- Op. 92, Introduction and Allegro Appassionato for Piano and Orchestra (1849)
- Op. 93, Motet: "Verzweifle nicht im Schmerzenstal" (1849 for unaccompanied male double choir, 1850 with organ accompaniment, 1852 with orchestral accompaniment and organ ad lib)
- Op. 94, Three Romances for Oboe and Piano (1849)
- Op. 95, 3 Gesänge on Hebrew Melodies of Lord Byron (1849)
- Op. 96, Lieder und Gesänge volume IV (1850)
- Op. 97, Symphony No. 3 in E♭, Rhenish (1850)
- Op. 98a, Lieder und Gesänge from Goethe's Wilhelm Meister (1849)
- Op. 98b, Requiem for Mignon for solo voices, chorus and orchestra (1849)
- Op. 99, Bunte Blätter (1836–1849) for piano
- Op. 100, The Bride of Messina overture (1850–51)
- Op. 101, Minnespiel on F. Rückert's Liebesfrühling (for solo and mixed SATB voices and piano) (1849)
- Op. 102, 5 Stücke im Volkston for piano and cello (1849)
- Op. 103, Mädchenlieder of Elisabeth Kulman (for 2 sopranos and piano) (1851)
- Op. 104, 7 Lieder of Elisabeth Kulman (1851)
- Op. 105, Violin Sonata No. 1 in A minor (1851)
- Op. 106, Declamation with piano, "Schön Hedwig" (1849)
- Op. 107, 6 Gesänge (1851–52)
- Op. 108, Nachtlied for chorus and orchestra (1849)
- Op. 109, Ball-Scenen (Scenes from a Ball) (piano 4-hands) (1851)
- Op. 110, Piano Trio No. 3 in G minor (1851)
- Op. 111, Three Fantasiestücke (1851) for piano
- Op. 112, Der Rose Pilgerfahrt: Fairy tale by Moritz Horn (1851)
- Op. 113, Märchenbilder for piano and viola (1851)
- Op. 114, 3 Lieder (for 3 female voices) (1853)
- Op. 115, Overture and incidental music, Manfred (1848–49)
- Op. 116, Der Königssohn (Uhland), for solos, chorus and orchestra (1851)
- Op. 117, 4 Husarenlieder of N. Lenau (for baritone) (1851)
- Op. 118, Drei Sonaten für die Jugend (Three Piano Sonatas for the Young) (1853)
- Op. 119, 3 Gedichte from Die Waldliedern of S. Pfarrius (1851)
- Op. 120, Symphony No. 4 in D minor (1841; revised in 1851)
- Op. 121, Violin Sonata No. 2 in D minor (1851)
- Op. 122, Declamation with piano: "Ballade vom Heideknaben" and "Die Flüchtlinge" (1852)
- Op. 123, Festival Overture with song on the Rheinweinlied for orchestra and chorus (1853)
- Op. 124, Albumblätter (Album Leaves) (1832–1845) (includes one piece previously part of WoO 31)
- Op. 125, 5 heitere Gesänge (1851)
- Op. 126, Seven Piano Pieces in Fughetta Form (1853)
- Op. 127, 5 Lieder und Gesänge (1850–51)
- Op. 128, Julius Caesar overture (1851)
- Op. 129, Cello Concerto in A minor (1850)
- Op. 130, Children's Ball (Kinderball) (piano 4-hands) (1853)
- Op. 131, Fantasy in C for violin and orchestra (1853)
- Op. 132, Märchenerzählungen, four pieces for clarinet, viola and pianoforte (probably 1853)
- Op. 133, Songs of Dawn (Gesänge der Frühe) (1853) for piano
- Op. 134, Introduction and Concert Allegro for Piano and Orchestra (1853)
- Op. 135, Gedichte der Königin Maria Stuart: from a collection of Old-English Poems (1852)
- Op. posth. 136, Hermann und Dorothea overture (1851)
- Op. posth. 137, Jagdlieder: 5 Songs from H. Laube's Jagdbrevier (for men's chorus with 4 horns ad lib) (1849)
- Op. posth. 138, Spanische Liebeslieder: A Song-Cycle in 2 Parts on Spanish Folksongs and Romances (for solo and mixed SATB voices, and piano 4-hands) (1849)
- Op. posth. 139, "Des Sängers Fluch" (Uhland) for solo voice, chorus and orchestra (1852)
- Op. posth. 140, "Vom Pagen und der Königstochter" for solo voice, chorus, and orchestra (1852)
- Op. posth. 141, 4 doppelchörige Gesänge (partsongs) (1849)
- Op. posth. 142, 4 Gesänge (1852)
- Op. posth. 143, "Das Glück von Edenhall" (Uhland) for solo voice, chorus, and orchestra (1853)
- Op. posth. 144, "Neujahrslied" for chorus and orchestra (1849–50)
- Op. posth. 145, Romanzen & Balladen Vol. III (5 songs for unaccompanied chorus) (1849–51)
- Op. posth. 146, Romanzen & Balladen Vol. IV (5 songs for unaccompanied chorus) (1849)
- Op. posth. 147, Missa sacra (1852)
- Op. posth. 148, Requiem (1852)

== By WoO ==
- WoO 1: Der deutsche Rhein (Patriotic Song) (1840)
- WoO 2: Violin Sonata No. 3 in A minor (1853)
- WoO 3: Szenen aus Goethes Faust (1844–53)
- WoO 4: Canon on F.H. Himmel's "An Alexis send' ich dich" (1832–1833)
- WoO 5: Scherzo & Presto Passionato (for Piano) (1835)
- WoO 6: Supplementary Variations to Symphonic Etudes Op. 13 (1837)
- WoO 7: Soldatenlied (for voice and piano) (1844)
- WoO 8: Albumblatt 'Auf Wiedersehn' für Niels W. Gade (for Voice and Piano) (1844)
- WoO 9: Sommerruh (for two voices and Piano) (1849)
- WoO 10: Andante and variations for two pianos, two cellos and horn (1843) (original version of Op. 46, arranged for two pianos)
- WoO 11: Zwei Balladen (for voice and piano) (1840)
- WoO 12: Canon (for male voices) (1847)
- WoO 13: Freiheitsgesang I (for male choir) (1848)
- WoO 14: Freiheitsgesang II (for male choir) (1848)
- WoO 15: Freiheitsgesang III (for male choir) (1848)
- WoO 16: Additional pieces to Album für die Jugend Op. 68 (1848)
- WoO 17: Canon (for male voices) (1847)
- WoO 18: Hirtenknaben-Gesang (for unaccompanied choir) (1846)
- WoO 19: Der Fischer (Jugendlied) (1827–28)
- WoO 20: Eight Polonaises (piano 4-hands) (1828)
- WoO 21: 6 Jugendlieder (1827–1828)
- WoO 23: Violin Concerto in D minor (1853)
- WoO 24: Thema mit Variationen (Geistervariationen) (1854)
- WoO 28: Supplement to the Op. 12 Fantasiestücke (1837)
- WoO 30: Additional pieces to Album für die Jugend Op. 68 (1848)
- WoO 31: 15 Studies in the Form of Free Variations on a Theme by Beethoven (1833–1835)
- WoO 32: Piano quartet in C minor (1829)
