= List of solo piano compositions by Robert Schumann =

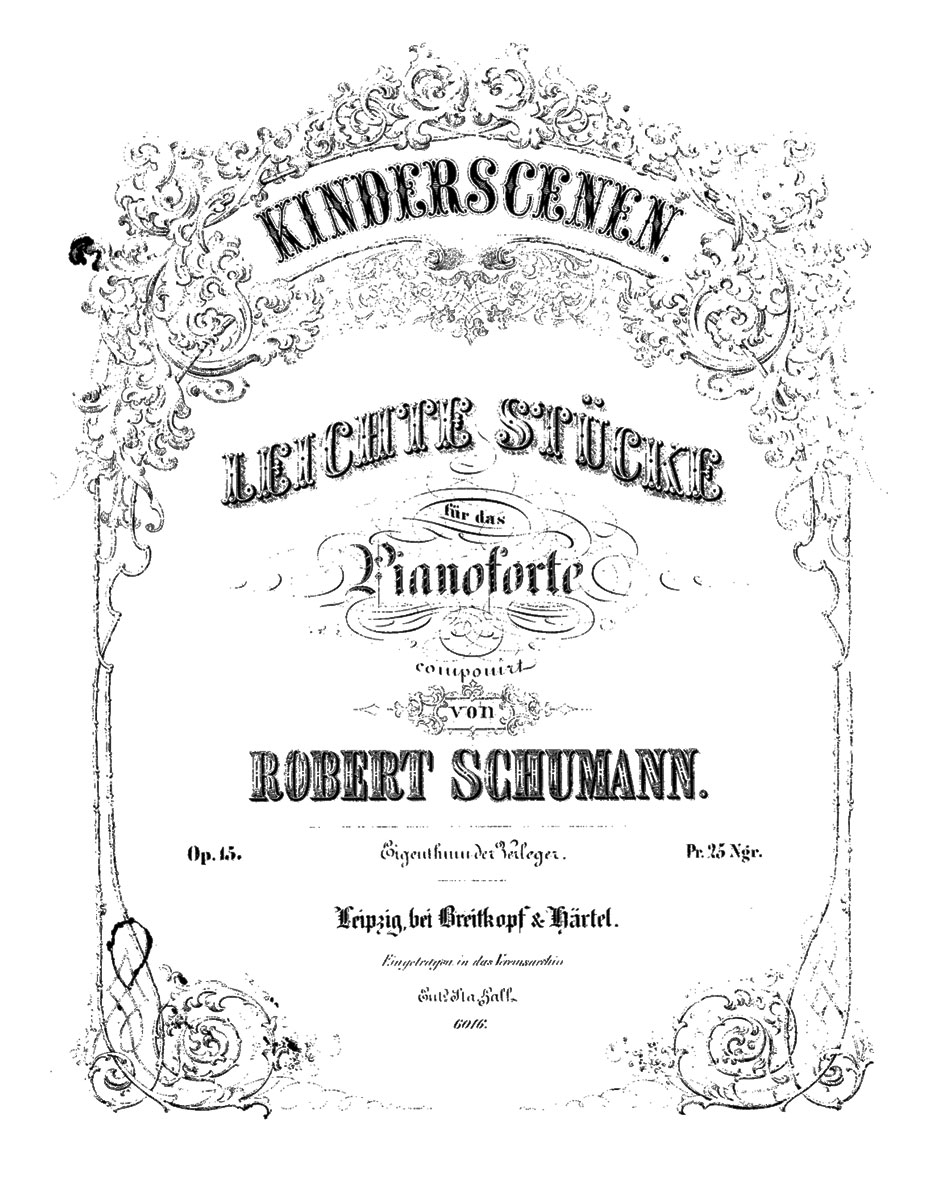
Title page for the first edition of Kinderszenen.

The following is a list of compositions by Robert Schumann for piano solo and for pedal piano solo. (Note: All Schumann's works for pedal piano may also be performed by organ, as was always indicated by the composer. Organ performances are considerably more common today because there exist so few pedal pianos.) Schumann was a pianist himself and wrote over fifty works for the piano, numbering hundreds of constituent pieces and movements. Because his first 26 published works were all written for solo piano, the first ten years of Schumann's career are strongly associated with the instrument; nevertheless, he composed and published work for the piano throughout his entire life, and Schumann's final composition, the Geistervariationen, was a set of variations for solo piano.

This list is based upon the Thematisch-Bibliographisches Werkverzeichnis, a comprehensive catalogue of Schumann's works compiled by Margit L. McCorkle and published in 2003. Since Schumann's death scholars have made several separate attempts to catalogue his works not published with opus numbers. The result is that one work may bear several separate tags, as designated by the various cataloguers. For works published by Schumann or prepared by him for publication and published posthumously, opus numbers are given. For works not published or prepared for publication by Schumann, McCorkle's RSW ("Robert-Schumann-Werkverzeichnis") numbers are listed first, and Hofmann-Keil (H/K) WoO ("Werke ohne Opuszahl") numbers, which are still occasionally used, given in brackets where designated.

For a full list of Schumann's compositions, see List of compositions by Robert Schumann.

== Works ==
Catalogue No.	Title	Year of composition	Publication details	Notes
Op. 1	Variations on the name "Abegg"	1830	Kistner, Leipzig, November 1831	
Op. 2	Papillons	1829–1831	Kistner, Leipzig, February/March 1832	
Op. 3	Etudes after Paganini Caprices	1832	Hofmeister, Leipzig, August 1832	
Op. 4	Intermezzi	1832	Hofmeister, Leipzig, September 1833	
Op. 5	Impromptus on a theme of Clara Wieck	1833, revised 1850	Hofmeister, Leipzig, September 1833; (Note: Schumann had his brother Karl, a publisher in Schneeberg, engrave and print the Impromptus; afterwards he sought Hofmeister's permission to print his firm's name on the cover, in return for a commission. Schumann hoped this might lend the edition some authority.) revision also published by Hofmeister	
Op. 6	Davidsbündlertänze	1837, revised 1850	Friese, Leipzig, January 1838; revision published by Schuberth, Hamburg and Leipzig	
Op. 7	Toccata in C major	1830-4	Hofmeister, Leipzig, early 1834	
Op. 8	Allegro in B minor	1831	Friese, Leipzig, end of 1834/beginning of 1835	
Op. 9	Carnaval	1834–1835	Breitkopf & Härtel, Leipzig, July 1837	
Op. 10	6 Concert Studies on Caprices by Paganini	1833	Hofmeister, Leipzig, September 1835	
Op. 11	Piano Sonata No. 1 in F♯ minor	1835	Kistner, Leipzig, June 1836	
Op. 12	Fantasiestücke	1837	Breitkopf & Härtel, Leipzig, February 1838	
RSW:op12:Anh (H/K WoO 28)	Supplement to the Op. 12 Fantasiestücke	1837	Modern publication	A piece withdrawn from publication by Schumann at the final redaction of the Fantasiestücke
Op. 13	Études symphoniques	1834-6, revised 1852	Haslinger, Vienna, May 1837; revision published by Schuberth, Hamburg and Leipzig	
RSW:op13:Anh:1-5 (H/K WoO 6)	Symphonic Etudes in Variation Form	1837	Modern publication	Five supplementary variations to Op.13, often performed as part of the main work
Op. 14	Piano Sonata No. 3 in F minor ("Concerto without Orchestra")	1835-6, revised 1853	First edition as Concert sans Orchestre by Haslinger, Vienna, September 1836; revision issued as Grande Sonate by Schuberth, Hamburg and Leipzig	
RSW:op14:Anh:1 (H/K WoO 5,1)	Scherzo	1835-36	Modern publication	Rejected from the Op. 14 Sonata
Op. 15	Kinderszenen	1838	Breitkopf & Härtel, Leipzig, March 1839	
Op. 16	Kreisleriana	1838, revised 1850	Haslinger, Vienna, September 1838; revision published by Whistling, Leipzig	
Op. 17	Fantasie in C	1836, revised 1839	Breitkopf & Härtel, Leipzig, April 1839	
Op. 18	Arabeske in C	1839	Mechetti, Vienna, August 1839	
Op. 19	Blumenstück in D♭	1839	Mechetti, Vienna, August 1839	
Op. 20	Humoreske in B♭	1839	Mechetti, Vienna, August 1839	
Op. 21	Novelletten	1838	Breitkopf & Härtel, Leipzig, June 1839	
Op. 22	Sonata No. 2 in G minor	1833–1835	Breitkopf & Härtel, Leipzig, September 1839	
RSW:op22:Anh (H/K WoO 5,2)	Presto passionato	1835	Modern publication	Original finale for Sonata No. 2 Op. 22
Op. 23	Nachtstücke	1839	Mechetti, Vienna, June 1840	
Op. 26	Faschingsschwank aus Wien	1839	Mechetti, Vienna, August 1841	
Op. 28	3 Romanzen	1839	Breitkopf & Härtel, Leipzig, October 1840	
Op. 32	4 Klavierstücke (Scherzo, Gigue, Romance and Fughette)	1838–1839	Schuberth, Hamburg and Leipzig, February/March 1841	
Op. 56	Etuden in kanonischer Form für Orgel oder Pedalklavier	1845	Whistling, Leipzig, September 1846	
Op. 58	Skizzen für Orgel oder Pedalklavier	1845	Kistner, Leipzig, August 1846	
Op. 60	6 Fugen über den Namen Bach für Orgel oder Pedalklavier	1845	Whistling, Leipzig, November 1846	
Op. 68	Album für die Jugend	1848	Schuberth, Hamburg and Leipzig, end of 1849; reissued December of the following year, unrevised but with a new text appendix	
RSW:op68:Anh:9,10,13,14 (H/K WoO 16)	Additional pieces to Album für die Jugend Op. 68	1848	Modern publication	
RSW:op68:Anh:1,3,6,9,10,13,14,16-18,21,24,26,27 (H/K WoO 30)	Additional pieces to Album für die Jugend Op. 68	1848	Modern publication	
Op. 72	4 Fugues	1845	Whistling, Leipzig, September 1850	
Op. 76	4 Marches	1849	Whistling, Leipzig, August 1849	
Op. 82	Waldszenen	1848–1849	Senff, Leipzig, November 1850	
Op. 99	Bunte Blätter	1836–1849	Arnold, Elberfeld, December 1851	
Op. 111	Three Fantasiestücke, Op. 111	1851	Peters, Leipzig, July 1852	
Op. 118	3 Piano Sonatas for the Young	1853	Schuberth, Hamburg and Leipzig, December 1853	
Op. 124	Albumblätter	1832–1845	Arnold, Elberfeld, December 1853	
Op. 126	7 Pieces in Fughetta Form	1853	Arnold, Elberfeld, May 1854	
Op. 133	Gesänge der Frühe	1853	Arnold, Elberfeld, November 1855	
RSW:Anh:F2	Romanze in F minor	1829	Modern publication	Fragment
RSW:Anh:F7	Variations in G on an original theme, "“Mit Gott”"	1831-32	Modern publication	Fragment
RSW:Anh:F8	Introduction, Theme, and Sketches for 4 variations on a theme of Paganini’s “La Campanella” in B minor	1831-32	Modern publication	Unfinished
RSW:Anh:F11	Exercise fantastique	1832		Lost
RSW:Anh:F12	Étude fantastique	1830-32		Lost
RSW:Anh:F14	12 Burlesken (or Burlen und Papilloten)	1832	Modern publication	Fragments
RSW:Anh:F15	Fandango in F♯ minor	1832	Modern publication	Some material from this was reused in the Op. 11 Sonata
RSW:Anh:F18	Fantasie satyrique, after Henri Herz	1832	Modern publication	Fragment
RSW:Anh:F19	8 Fugen und Kanons	1832-33	Modern publication	
RSW:Anh:F19,8 (H/K WoO 4)	Canon on F.H. Himmel's "An Alexis send' ich dich" in A♭ major	1832-33	Modern publication	
RSW:Anh:F24	Variationen über den “Sehnsuchtswalzer” von Franz Schubert in A♭ major	1831-34	Modern publication	Unfinished. The opening was reused in No. 1 from Carnaval, Op. 9
RSW:Anh:F25 (H/K WoO 31)	15 Studies in the Form of Free Variations on a Theme by Beethoven	1833–1835	Modern publication: Henle, Munich 1976	The theme is the opening of the Allegretto from Beethoven's seventh symphony
RSW:Anh:F26	Variations on a nocturne by Chopin in G minor	1835-36	Modern publication	Incomplete. The theme is Chopin's nocturne Op. 15, No. 3)
RSW:Anh:F28	Sonata No.4 in F minor	1833-37	Modern publication	Unfinished
RSW:Anh:F39 (H/K WoO 24)	Thema mit Variationen (Geistervariationen)	1854	Modern publication: Hinrichsen, London, 1939	

== Sources ==
- Daverio, John (1997). Robert Schumann. Oxford Oxfordshire: Oxford University Press. ISBN 9780195091809.
- McCorkle, Margit L. (2003). Thematisch-Bibliographisches Werkverzeichnis. Munich: G. Henle Verlag. ISBN 9783873281103.
