= Five Pieces in Folk Style =

Composition by Robert Schumann

Fünf Stücke im Volkston
- by Robert Schumann
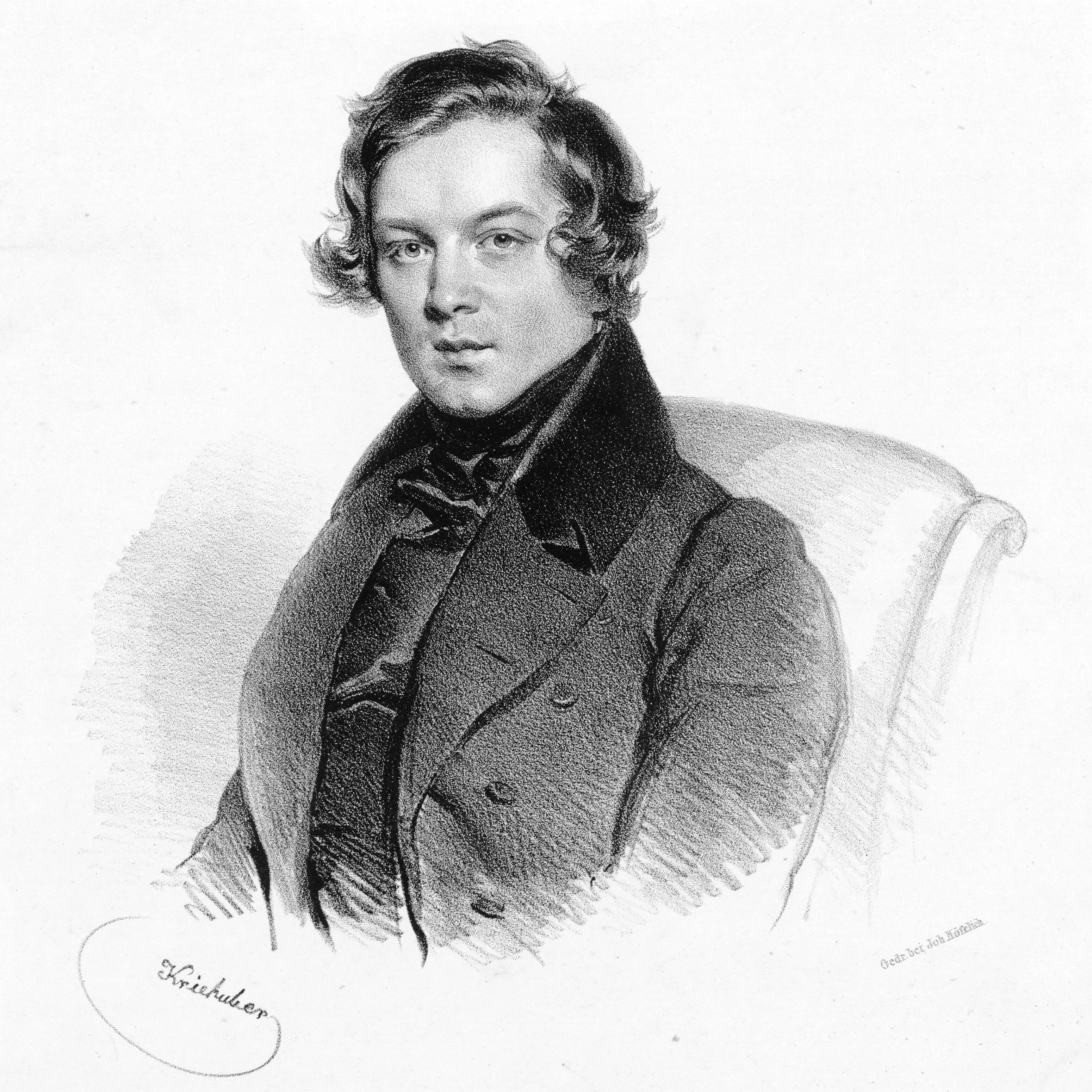
- Key: A minor
- Catalogue: Op. 102
- Period: Romantic
- Composed: 1849
- Published: 1851
- Movements: 5
- Scoring: Cello and piano

Robert Schumann's Five Pieces in Folk Style (German: Fünf Stücke im Volkston), Op. 102 is a set of five short pieces for cello and piano, composed in 1849 and published in 1851 with a dedication to cellist Andreas Grabau. It was Schumann's only published work designed explicitly for performance by cello and piano, though the pieces also appeared in a version prepared by Schumann for violin and piano. The first edition's title page reads "ad libitum violine".

Another set of five pieces for piano and cello were composed by Schumann in 1853, and performed privately to acclaim; but the pieces never appeared in print and were destroyed in 1893 by Clara, who considered them the inferior product of madness.

== History ==
The last part of the 1840s were productive years for Schumann. Following his marriage to Clara in 1840, Schumann had rediscovered an interest in the composition of music not for piano solo which he had pursued to a degree in his youth, but which he had largely abandoned to focus upon the more remunerative music that would appear during his twenties. During this time Schumann composed music in an array of genres.

In the early 1840s Schumann completed and published his string quartets, the Piano Quintet and Quartet, and the Andante and Variations for two pianos. In 1845 the Schumanns moved to Dresden, which Schumann had considered a suitable location for the couple even before their marriage. They would spend the latter part of the decade there. Schumann turned to chamber music on the smaller scale; all the chamber music of this period was for piano and one or two other instruments. Schumann composed three duets, the first he ever completed, in 1849: the Five Pieces, the Adagio and Allegro for Horn and Piano and the Fantasiestücke for Clarinet, Op. 73. The period 1845–53 was also the time of the composition and premieres of all of Schumann's concerti and concertante works, beginning with the piano concerto, which appeared in 1845. Between 1845 and 1847 Schumann struggled against actual ill-health, hypochondria, and depression to complete the symphony published as his Second.

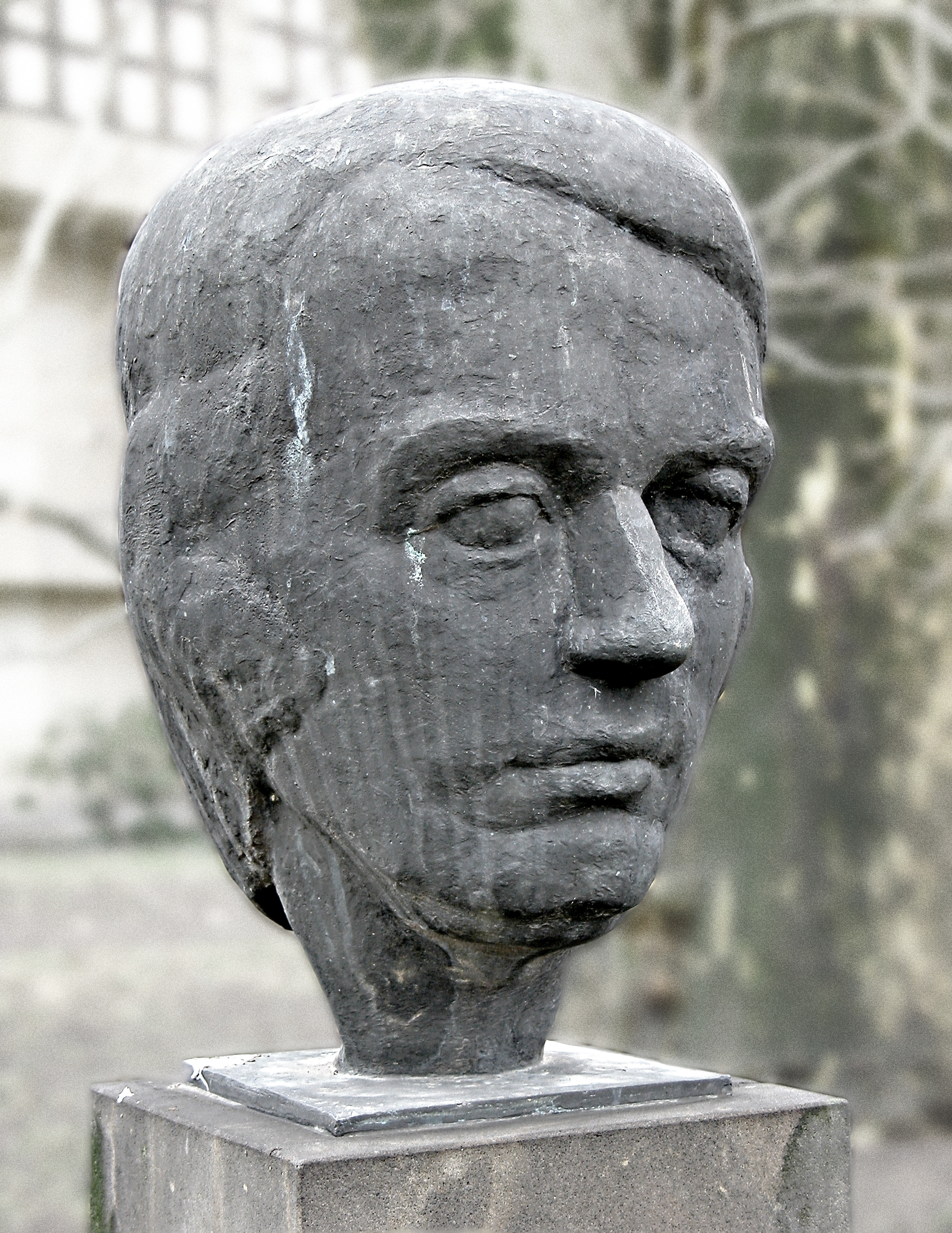
Bust of the mature Schumann erected as a memorial in the park surrounding the Zwingerteich, Dresden

The year 1849 was a particularly active one for the Schumanns. Robert was busied by finishing touches to his opera Genoveva, whose premiere in Leipzig would take place the following year. But in February and March, he completed the Fantasiestücke, the Adagio and Allegro for Horn and Piano, the Konzertstück for Four Horns and Orchestra, and several choral works and cycles of Lieder including the Romanzen für Frauenstimmen, a set of part-songs, and the Spanisches Liederspiel of songs for four soloists. These meant income for Schumann (a priority for him in 1849, which ended in the publication of the lucrative Album für die Jugend) and also served to raise his profile amongst the genteel public of Dresden, where small-scale music in the home was more popular than concert works of the sort which had made Schumann famous elsewhere. Meanwhile, the violence of the May Uprising in Dresden, where the Schumanns had their home, was brewing. At the time Clara was pregnant with Ferdinand, their sixth child, but they were forced to flee the city in early May, and went to live in the nearby village of Kreischa.

The Five Pieces were conceived early in the flowering of Schumann's interest in chamber works for duet, and so the project's result was somewhat formally and texturally experimental for Schumann. They preceded his first conventional sonata for soloist and piano accompaniment, the first violin sonata, by two years; they also preceded the composition of the cello concerto by a year, and served as a venue for textural and technical experimentation in cello writing for Schumann. The pieces also reflect Schumann's longstanding interest in folk music, especially music from Germany and Bohemia.

The dedicatee of the work, Andreas Grabau, was a cellist in the Leipzig Gewandhaus Orchestra and a celebrated chamber musician. He had met Clara Schumann in 1828, when she was nine years old, and was introduced soon after to Robert. Later, he would premiere Schumann's first and third piano trios. He was a Davidsbündler, whom Schumann, himself a student of the cello in his youth, greatly admired. A year before their publication in 1851, Grabau performed the Five Pieces with Clara in private, in honour of Schumann's fortieth birthday. The work was published at Kassel by Carl Luckhardt in September 1851. Schumann prepared an alternative edition for violin and piano. After Schumann's death, Clara staged a public premiere for the work in December 1859 at the Leipzig Gewandhaus. Friedrich Grützmacher was accompanied by Clara herself.

== Music ==
1st movement
Cellist John Michel and an unnamed pianist

Each of the Five Pieces in Folk Style possesses a distinctive character, and strong contrast in mood, tempo and technique amongst the pieces lends the work its overall structure. Despite Schumann's fondness for programme and the allusion in the work's name to German folk music (or in some translations 'popular' music), the pieces were not titled individually by Schumann; only the first received from Schumann an atmospheric heading in Latin, Vanitas vanitatum ('Vanity of vanities', the incipit of Ecclesiastes but possibly inspired more directly by the title of Goethe's poem "Vanitas! Vanitatum vanitas"; in general, a favourite saying of Schumann's).

The pieces are:

1. Vanitas vanitatum: Mit Humor (With humour)
2. Langsam (Slow)
3. Nicht schnell, mit viel Ton zu spielen (Not quick, played with much tone)
4. Nicht zu rasch (Not too fast)
5. Stark und markiert (Strong and marked)

The set as a whole is in A minor, the key of its first, last and middle movements. The second ("Langsam") is in F major; the fourth ("Nicht zu rasch") in D major. All are in 2/4 time except number 3, in 6/8, and number 4, in common time.

The pieces are not straightforwardly folk songs; nor are their themes lifted from folk songs. Instead each is an entirely original composition which emulates the style of folk music. In keeping with the folk style the pieces are not unusually harmonically experimental, as many of his late compositions were, but Schumann achieved a sense of folk by rhythmic ingenuity. In particular, he experiments in the set with unbalanced phrases and strong, irregular syncopations. Consider the first part of the main theme of number one (Vanitas vanitatum), stated here in the opening four bars of the cello part:

This excerpt is built upon the rhythmic motif which appears in bars 2, 3 and 4 (semiquaver-semiquaver-quaver), the inclusion of jabbing, characterful rhythms like these being a typically Schumannesque device; the third movement waltz of the Op. 2 Papillons contains a very similar rhythmic example. But the most striking rhythmic feeling is one of unbalance, because the phrase falls in groups of 3, 3 and 2 quavers, each concluding with the motif; the time of the piece being two, the motif falls on the first beat of the second bar, but the second beat of the third and fourth bars. The effect is almost reminiscent of Bartok's folk-inspired work.

The main theme of the second piece is lyrical and slow, but has some of the same repetitive and rhythmically curious character of number one:

The theme begins with a three-bar melody containing an arpeggio rising to the tonic, descent by an octave, then an ornamented three-note descent from B♭ to G; then the melody is repeated exactly, and a final bar provides a cadence. The single-bar cadence appended to the melody gives the whole theme a duration of seven bars, an irregular length for a piece which was the product of the early Romantic movement in music, dominated by the balanced four-bar phrases which are typical of Schubert, Mendelssohn, and even Schumann in the greater part of his output. The uneven seven-bar theme lends the second piece a seamless sense of flow. It drives the music forwards in a search for rhythmic stability.

== Reception and influence ==
The pieces were well-received by Schumann's fellow musicians and critics at the time of their composition and publication. The following review, by the composer Karl Emanuel Klitzsch, is typical of the critical attitude to Schumann's later work. It appeared in the Neue Zeitschrift für Musik two months before the Five Pieces' publication in September 1851:

Naturally we ought not expect in these pieces anything such as the salon desires and as virtuosi are accustomed to serving up to us for the sake of the development of their bravura, still less a couple of melodic shreds with the traditional popular character; instead these are pieces which the composer has composed poetically in the free spirit of folk, creations representing particular moments from folk life in rather an idealized form. The connections to certain opinions concerning the emaciation of the spirit of the folk are discovered quickly, if any person should go to the effort of looking more deeply. They are certainly not for thoughtless players; as is generally the case with our master's tone poems, not every person uncovers the vastness of the terrain the first time he has a go. The humour and the bold spirit which overmaster everything else strike us even in the just the first bars of No. 1. Above them reads the title "vanitas vanitatum", which could not describe them more aptly. Nos. 2 and 3 speak of innerliness and gentle complaint by simple but urgent strains, Nos. 4 and 5 of strength and resolution with bombastic manner. These pieces do not call for a virtuoso so much as a shrewd performer, able to speak upon his instrument with sound and with significance.

== See also ==
- List of compositions by Robert Schumann
