= Violin Sonata No. 1 (Schumann) =

1851 composition by Robert Schumann

Violin Sonata
- No. 1
- by Robert Schumann
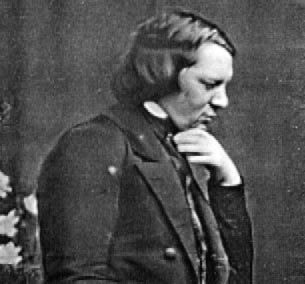
- Schumann c. 1850
- Key: A minor
- Opus: 105
- Composed: September 1851
- Performed: March 1852
- Published: 1851
- Publisher: Hofmeister
- Movements: 3

The Violin Sonata No. 1 in A minor, Op. 105 of Robert Schumann was written the week of 12–16 September 1851. Schumann was reported to have expressed displeasure with the work ("I did not like the first Sonata for Violin and Piano; so I wrote a second one, which I hope has turned out better"). This was also the year of the premiere of the Rhenish symphony, and among compositions the substantial revision of the Fourth Symphony, the Third Piano Trio, the oratorio Der Rose Pilgerfahrt, a number of piano works and two of his concert overtures, Julius Caesar (after Shakespeare) and Hermann und Dorothea after Goethe.

The first private performance was on 16 October 1851 by Clara Schumann and Wilhelm Joseph von Wasielewski. It was given its official premiere by Clara Schumann and Ferdinand David in March 1852.

== Structure ==
The sonata has three movements:

1. Mit leidenschaftlichem Ausdruck
2. Allegretto
3. Lebhaft

=== I. Mit leidenschaftlichem Ausdruck ===
The first movement begins passionately, with the theme first played by the violin and amenable like so many of Schumann's themes to canonic treatment; Schumann once remarked on this fact himself. This theme serves to introduce a compact, driven sonata form pushed ahead by economical use of rhythms (new themes often are based on some of the same rhythms as older ones, and overlap with them as well). The sonata is also driven by the intensity added by canonic treatment of themes, revolving around and pushing towards a small number of climaxes, one of which is the reappearance of the opening theme in a much-slowed-down form just preceding (and followed without pause by) the recapitulation.

The coda is in two parts — quiet sustained over an F-E pedal with several recurrences of the main theme, gaining intensity and leading to a section — most of a page — in which the violin has running sixteenth notes, the piano mostly chords, until the final harmonies A major - A minor - B diminished - E major - A minor.

=== II. Allegretto ===
An intermezzo at a brisk pace somewhere between a slow movement and a scherzo, in the form of a rondo with two episodes (in F Major and D minor, the latter Bewegter).

=== III. Lebhaft ===
The finale begins with a theme similar to that which opens Felix Mendelssohn's second piano trio. The sixteenth-note motion dominates the exposition, present in all but a few bars. A group of themes in F major enters about halfway through the fifty-eight bar exposition, but is quickly diverted back to the main flow of A minor. The development introduces new themes mostly based on the exposition's material (some by augmentation and other variation) and treats them, again, canonically before gradually introducing a songful episode. This is also based on the main material of the movement, and is only a brief moment in which to relax before the scurrying sixteenths return. A transitional passage leads to the recapitulation, which is for about twenty bars the same as the equivalent passage in the exposition. The material which leads to the second group opens in C major this time rather than A minor, however, and the second group is heard in A major.

The major-mode themes are accorded slightly less space this time around before A minor returns in the form of a quiet pair of octaves, F in tremolo in the left hand and A held in the right, occasionally alternating with the scurrying sixteenths; over which the violin plays the longer version of its main theme from the first movement, twice, then, crescendo, joins in the piano's perpetual motion frenzy until a recall of the canonic theme that had opened the development is reached - now played sforzando (mit Violoncell, Schumann also writes), opening the last stage of the coda punctuating the rush to the final chords sixteen bars later.

The sonata was published, by Hofmeister in 1852 or perhaps late 1851 as a sonata for piano and violin, not violin and piano.
