= Piano Trio No. 2 =

Piano Trio No. 2 may refer to:

- Piano Trio No. 2 (Beethoven)
- Piano Trio No. 2 (Brahms)
- Piano Trio No. 2 (Dvořák)
- Piano Trio No. 2 (Mendelssohn)
- Piano Trio No. 2 (Mozart)
- Piano Trio No. 2 (Schubert)
- Piano Trio No. 2 (Schumann)
- Piano Trio No. 2 (Shostakovich)
