= Op. 87 =

In music, Op. 87 stands for Opus number 87. Compositions that are assigned this number include:

- Brahms – Piano Trio No. 2
- Dvořák – Piano Quartet No. 2
- Elgar – The Severn Suite
- Fauré – Le Plus doux chemin
- Mendelssohn – String Quintet No. 2
- Prokofiev – Cinderella
- Rautavaara – String Quartet No. 4
- Ries – Flute Sonata No. 4
- Schumann – Der Handschuh
- Shostakovich – 24 Preludes and Fugues
- Sibelius – Two Humoresques, concertante works for violin and orchestra (1917, revised 1940)
