= Op. 102 =

In music, Op. 102 stands for Opus number 102. Compositions that are assigned this number include:

- Beethoven – Cello Sonatas Nos. 4 and 5
- Brahms – Double Concerto
- Mendelssohn – Songs without Words, Book VIII
- Saint-Saëns – Violin Sonata No. 2
- Schumann – 5 Stücke im Volkston for piano and cello
- Shostakovich – Piano Concerto No. 2
