= Op. 108 =

In music, Op. 108 stands for Opus number 108. Compositions that are assigned this number include:

- Beethoven – 25 Scottish Songs
- Brahms – Violin Sonata No. 3
- Dvořák – The Noon Witch
- Fauré – Violin Sonata No. 2
- Saint-Saëns – Barcarolle in F major
- Schumann – Nachtlied for chorus and orchestra
- Shostakovich – String Quartet No. 7
