= Adagio and Allegro =

Adagio and Allegro may refer to:

- Adagio and Allegro in F minor for a mechanical organ, K. 594 (Mozart)
- Adagio and Allegro for Horn and Piano (Schumann)
