= Piano Trio No. 3 =

Piano Trio No. 3 may refer to:

- Piano Trio No. 3 (Beethoven)
- Piano Trio No. 3 (Brahms)
- Piano Trio No. 3 (Dvořák)
- Piano Trio No. 3 (Mozart)
- Piano Trio No. 3 (Schumann)
