= Op. 147 =

In music, Op. 147 stands for Opus number 147. Compositions that are assigned this number include:

- Foerster – Nonet
- Schubert – Piano Sonata in B major, D 575
- Schumann – Missa sacra
- Shostakovich – Viola Sonata
