= Op. 144 =

In music, Op. 144 stands for Opus number 144. Compositions that are assigned this number include:

- Reger – Der Einsiedler
- Saint-Saëns – Cavatine
- Schumann – "Neujahrslied" for chorus and orchestra
- Shostakovich – String Quartet No. 15
