= Gesänge der Frühe =

Composition for piano by Robert Schumann

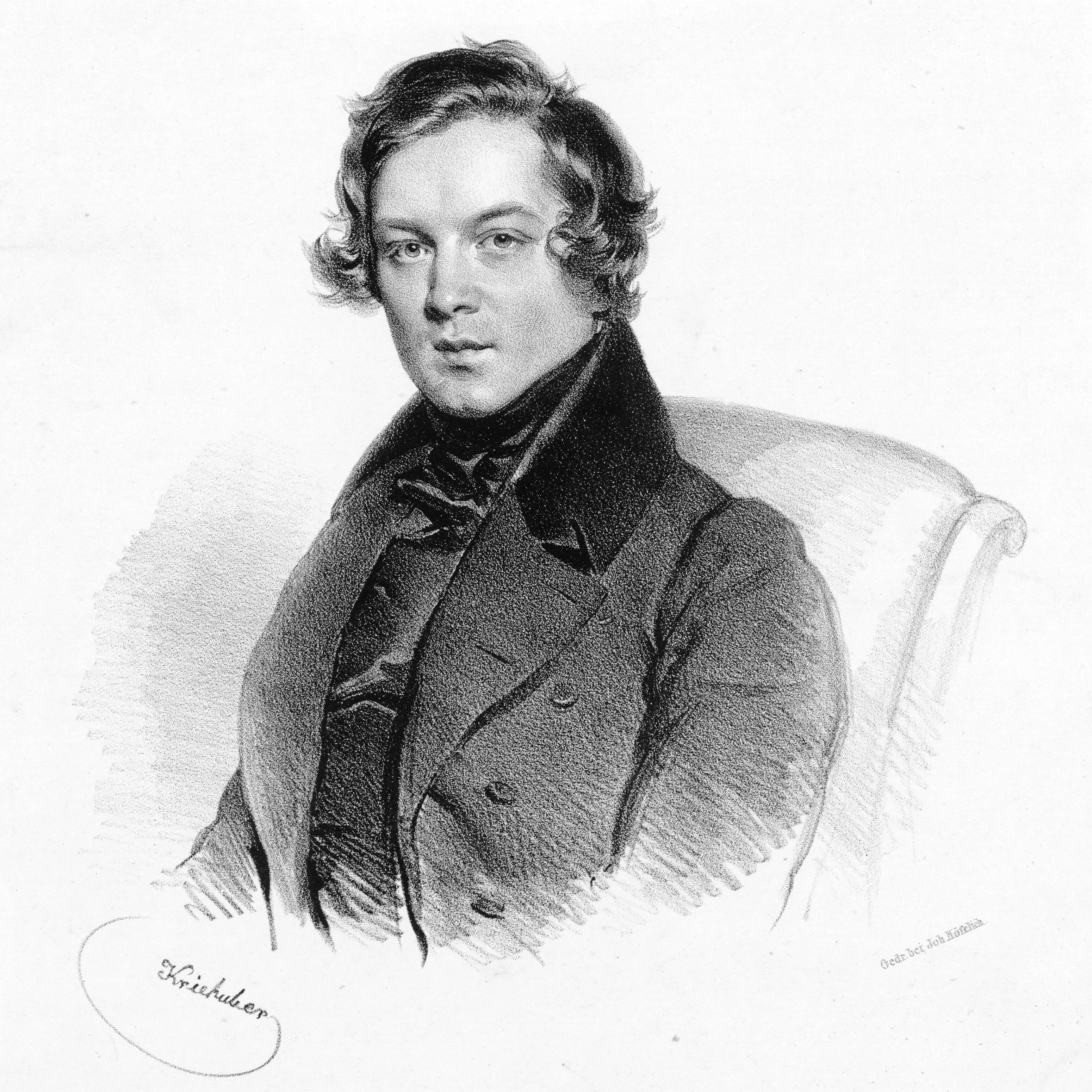
Robert Schumann in 1839

Gesänge der Frühe (Songs of the Morning), Op. 133, is a composition in five movements by Robert Schumann for solo piano. A performance takes about 13 minutes.

Composed in October 1853, it is one of Schumann's last compositions, composed three years before his death. By the time he began work on these pieces, he was suffering from mental and emotional decline. The set was composed just five months before Schumann's attempted suicide and confinement to a mental institution. The set is dedicated to "the high poetess" Bettina von Arnim.

Schumann's wife, Clara Schumann, wrote in her private diary, "dawn-songs, very original as always but hard to understand, their tone is so very strange."

The Swiss composer Heinz Holliger wrote a work for orchestra, choir and tape in 1987 under the same title, Gesänge der Frühe, which quoted Schumann and the German poet Friedrich Hölderlin.

== Movements ==
The five movements are tonally organized by the three notes in the D major triad: D, F♯, and A. The first, second, and fifth pieces are in D major; the fourth piece is in F♯ minor; and the third piece is in A major.

1. Im ruhigen Tempo (In a tranquil tempo, D major)

The opening movement is like a chorale with rhythmic simplicity and a subdued, but rich texture. Many dissonant intervals permeate the transparent texture. The main melody is heard in stretto in the final two phrases. The entire movement has an almost religious sonority.

2. Belebt, nicht zu rasch (Animated, not too quick, D major)

The movement is nearly entirely contrapuntal. The composer avoids showing listeners where the tonic key is.

3. Lebhaft (Lively, A major)

Probably the most virtuosic of the set, this movement has a constant, galloping rhythmic drive which continues throughout the piece. The octaves and large chords contribute to the heavy sonority.

4. Bewegt (With motion, F♯ minor)

A melody is mixed with a cascading accompaniment of 32nd notes. The music is restless and becomes agitated in the climax.

5. Im Anfange ruhiges, im Verlauf bewegtes Tempo (First tranquil, then moved tempo, D major)

The final piece returns to a similar character and sonority as the first movement. A quicker 16th note accompaniment emerges from the thin texture. The lack of a strong final cadence brings this enigmatic piece to an ambiguous, but beautiful close.
