= Piano Trio No. 2 (Schumann) =

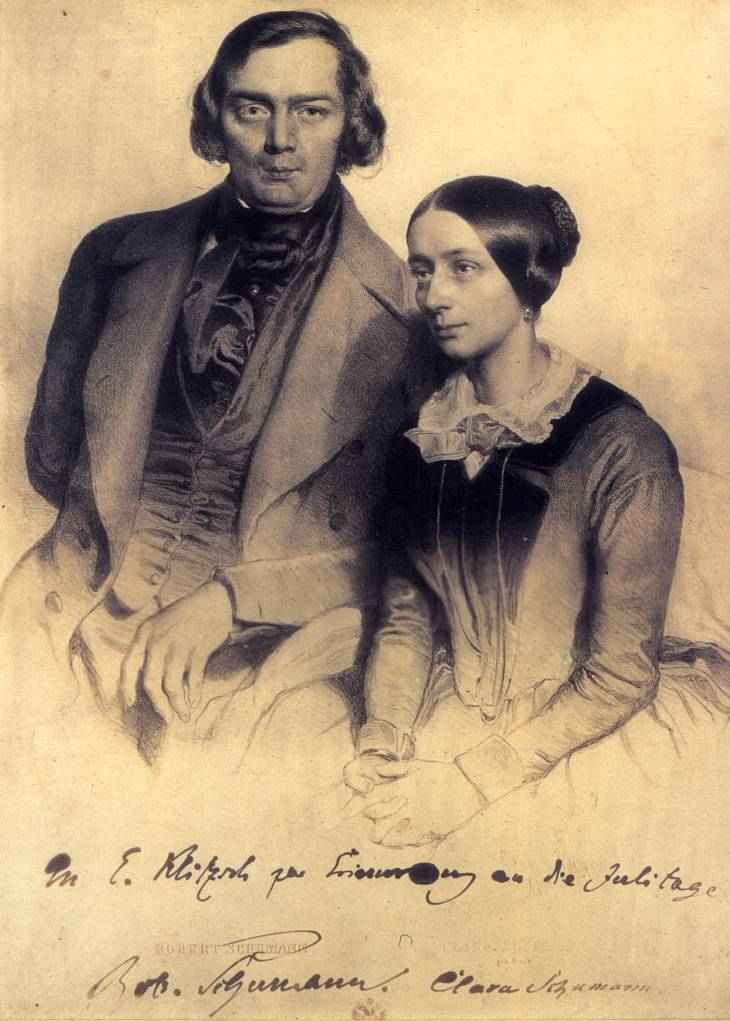
Robert and Clara Schumann in 1847, lithograph with a personal dedication

The Piano Trio No. 2 in F major, Op. 80, by Robert Schumann was written in 1847. It has four movements:

1. Sehr lebhaft in F major
2. Mit innigem Ausdruck – Lebhaft in D♭ major
3. In mässiger Bewegung in B♭minor
4. Nicht zu rasch in F major

Schumann's first two piano trios were written in close succession, despite the large gap between their opus numbers. The second piano trio is more effervescent and cheerful in mood than the first trio – the composer himself said that it makes a "friendlier and more immediate impression" than its predecessor.

Schumann's genius is heard in the way in which the first movement's relatively peaceful second subject sounds new and fresh, despite being a rhythmically altered version of the first subject. The development section contains a quotation the second number, "Intermezzo", from Liederkreis Op. 39. The intimately expressive second movement, in the key of D♭ major (the flattened submediant), opens with a sustained violin melody over an accompaniment consisting of cello and piano left hand in close strict canon. The waltz-like third movement, in B♭ minor, is also extensively built on canonic imitation. The material of the finale is largely built on the interplay between three contrasting elements in the first theme: a smoothly winding snatch of piano melody, a staccato answer in the cello, and a driving continuation in the violin.
