= Fantasiestücke, Op. 12 =

Set of eight pieces for piano by Robert Schumann

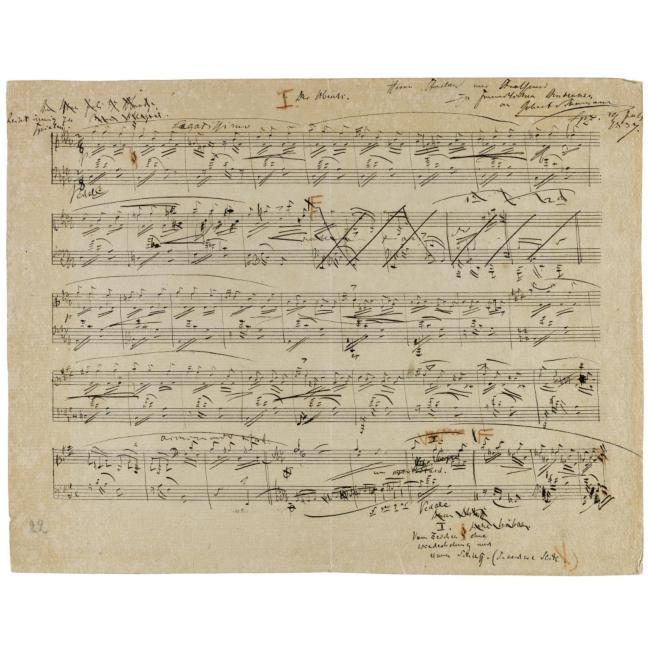
First page of Schumann's draft for "Des Abends"

Robert Schumann's Fantasiestücke, Op. 12, is a set of eight pieces for piano, written in 1837. The title was inspired by the 1814–15 collection of novellas, essays, treatises, letters, and writings about music, Fantasy Pieces in Callot's Manner (which also included the complete Kreisleriana, another source of inspiration for Schumann) by one of his favourite authors, E. T. A. Hoffmann. Schumann dedicated the pieces to Fräulein Anna Robena Laidlaw, an accomplished 18-year-old Scottish pianist with whom Schumann had become good friends.

Schumann composed the pieces with the characters Florestan and Eusebius in mind, representing the duality of his personality. Eusebius depicts the dreamer in Schumann while Florestan represents his passionate side. These two characters parlay with one another throughout the collection, ending self-reflectively with Eusebius in "Ende vom Lied".

== Details ==
=== 1. Des Abends ===
"Des Abends" (3:23 minutes)

The first piece is "Des Abends" ("In the Evening") in D♭ major. It is marked Sehr innig zu spielen (Play very intimately).

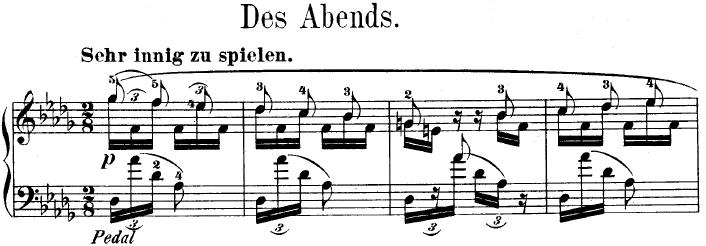

Schumann, after completing the work, then gave the piece its title, which introduces the character of Eusebius, who serves as a symbolic representation of Schumann's dreamy self. He intended the imagery to be a "gentle picture of dusk."

=== 2. Aufschwung ===
"Aufschwung" (3:29 minutes)

The second piece is "Aufschwung" ("Soaring", literally "Upswing") in F minor. It is marked Sehr rasch (Very rapidly).

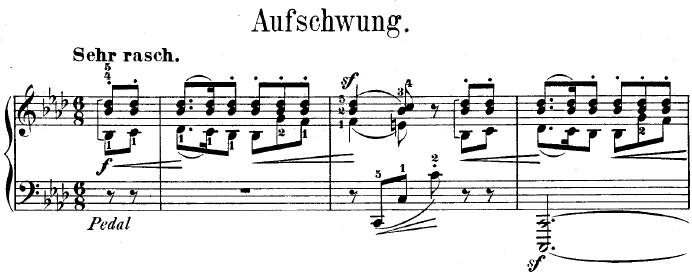

Schumann conceived of "Aufschwung" as a depiction of the character Florestan indulging in his desires, and as the Norton Anthology of Western Music describes "at the height of his passions."

=== 3. Warum? ===
"Warum?" (1:37 minutes)

The third piece is "Warum?" ("Why?") in D♭ major. It is marked Langsam und zart.

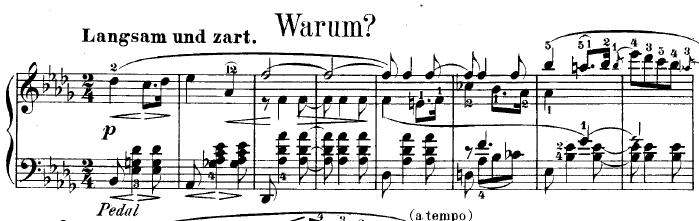

The title "Why?" was intended by Schumann to signify Eusebius's reflection on the excesses of Florestan in "Aufschwung". The piece proceeds with "gentle questioning" and ends with an "inconclusive answer."

=== 4. Grillen ===
"Grillen" (3:47 minutes)

The fourth piece is "Grillen" ("Whims") in D♭ major. It is marked Mit Humor (With humor).

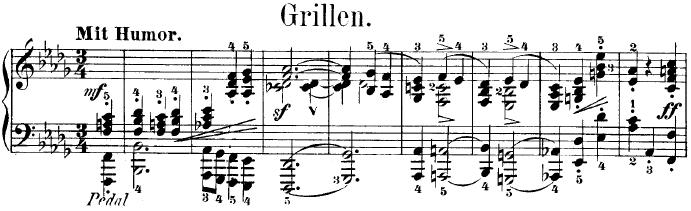

With its whimsical, quirky nature, this piece solely represents Florestan and his eccentricities.

=== 5. "In der Nacht" ===
"In der Nacht" (4:25 minutes)

The fifth piece is "In der Nacht" ("In the Night") in F minor. It is marked Mit Leidenschaft (With passion).

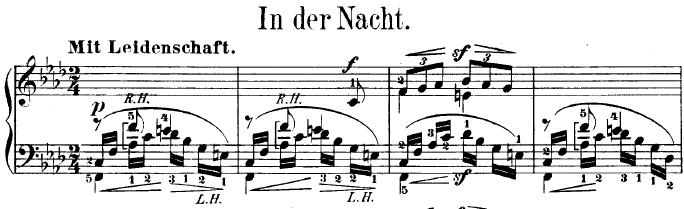

The two characters of Florestan and Eusebius (the interaction of which Schumann was attempting to represent within the Fantasiestücke) unite for the first time in this piece, which has both "passion together with nocturnal calm." Schumann said to Clara to have perceived in "In der Nacht" the story of Grillparzer's Hero and Leander, albeit not until after writing it: "It is an old and beautiful romantic legend. When I play ′Die Nacht′ [sic] I can never forget this image: first he plunges into the sea – she cries out – he answers – he swims safely to shore through the waves – now the cantilenas as they embrace – then he must leave but cannot bear to part – until night again enshrouds everything in darkness. – To be sure, I imagine Hero to be exactly like you; and if you were sitting atop a lighthouse I, too, would probably learn how to swim. But tell me whether you too think this image fits the music."

=== 6. "Fabel" ===
"Fabel" (2:09 minutes)

The sixth piece is "Fabel" ("Fable") in C major. It is marked Langsam (Slowly).

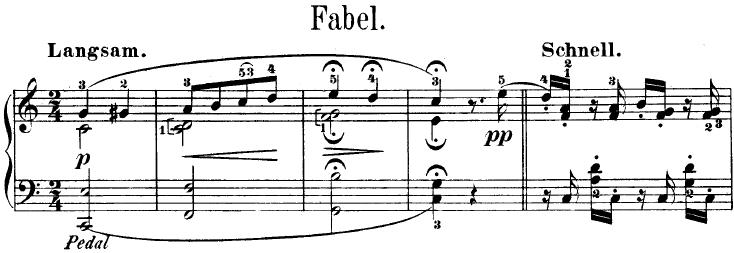

Like the previous piece, this also juxtaposes both the passionate and dreamy side of Schumann within the same work (as opposed to representing each separately, as in the first subset). The key of C major breaks from the pattern of D♭ major/F minor established by the previous pieces. In this piece, the whimsical nature of Florestan is set against the ethereal tranquility of Eusebius, resulting in a "placid narrative together with rich veins of humor."

=== 7. "Traumes Wirren" ===
"Traumes Wirren" (2:43 minutes)

The seventh piece is "Traumes Wirren" ("Dream's Confusions") in F major. It is marked Äußerst lebhaft (Extremely lively).

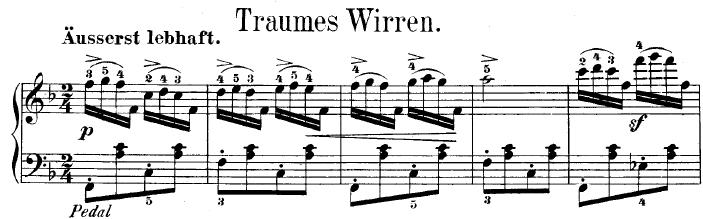

The title is implicative of the struggle between the dreams and the passions within Schumann. In this piece the dreamy quality of Schumann, represented by the character of Eusebius, becomes entangled by the passions of Florestan, who symbolizes Schumann's more emotional side. Like the previous piece, this piece also departs from the established D♭ major/F minor key signature scheme, as it is written in the key of F major which is also the key of "Ende vom Lied", the next piece. The piece is rhythmically intense and a rapid pulse permeates it.

=== 8. "Ende vom Lied" ===
"Ende vom Lied" (4:01 minutes)

The eighth piece is "Ende vom Lied" ("End of the Song") in F major. It is marked Mit gutem Humor (With good humor).

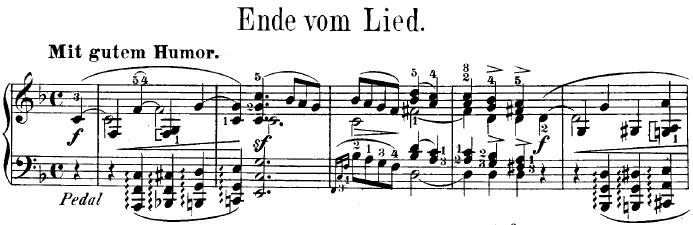

Schumann described this piece as a combination of wedding bells and funeral bells. In a letter to his fiancée Clara Wieck, who would become his wife, Clara Schumann, three years later, he wrote about this last piece: "everything ultimately dissolves into a merry wedding – but my distress for you came back at the end, and the wedding bells sound as if commingled with a death knell."

== See also ==
- List of solo piano compositions by Robert Schumann
- Fantasiestücke, Op. 73
- Three Fantasiestücke, Op. 111
