= Three Romances for Oboe and Piano (Schumann) =

Musical composition by Robert Schumann

- by Robert Schumann
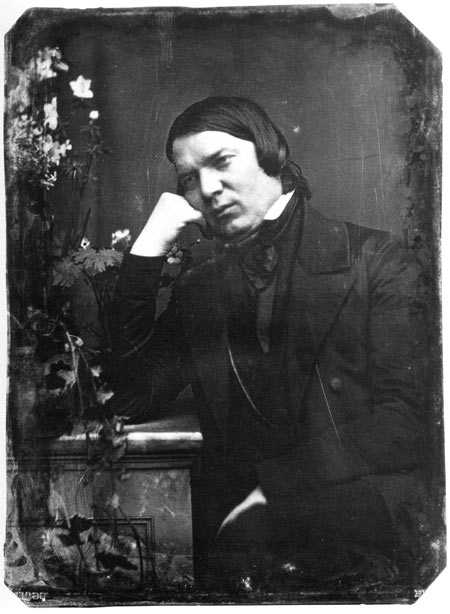
- Schumann in 1850
- Full title: Drei Romanzen für Oboe und Klavier
- Opus: 94
- Genre: Romances
- Performed: 2 November 1850 (private performance): 24 January 1863: Gewandhaus (world premiere)

The Three Romances for Oboe and Piano, Op. 94 (German: Drei Romanzen) is a composition by Robert Schumann, his only composition for oboe. It was composed in December 1849. The work consists of three short pieces in A-B-A form, and it was written during what was speculated to be one of Schumann's manic episodes.

The romances are a standard part of the oboe repertoire and are often considered amongst the best works written for the oboe. An average full performance lasts roughly 12 minutes.

== Background ==
The Romances were written in December 1849, one of the most productive years of Schumann's entire career. Previously that year, Schumann had written two other works for wind instruments and piano: the Adagio and Allegro, op. 70, for French Horn and piano, and the Fantasy Pieces for Clarinet and Piano, op. 73. According to Schumann himself, the pieces were written on December 7, 11, and 12th in Dresden., Unlike many other oboe works at the time, the pieces were not the result of a commission by a prominent soloist of the day. Schumann gave the pieces to his wife Clara Schumann, whom he once described as his own "right hand," as a Christmas present, calling them his "hundredth opusculum." Schumann's mental health was quickly deteriorating during the time of the pieces' writing; shortly afterward, he moved from Dresden to Düsseldorf, where he was admitted to and eventually died in an asylum.

== Structure and analysis ==
The three romances are marked in German:

1. Nicht schnell (not fast)
2. Einfach, innig (simple, heartfelt)
3. Nicht schnell

The three romances are simple, relatively easy to play, and not virtuosic. However, they also require a good amount of breath control. All three affairs are in "song form," or A-B-A. The work's melodies have been described as similar to each other.

The first romance consists of an introductory piano phrase followed by the central theme played by the oboe. The piano has a layered accompaniment. After a faster-paced main section, the movement ends softly after returning to the central theme. The romance as a whole has been described as "tranquil." The second romance, which is in A Major, is primarily a traditional duet between the two instruments with a tense B section that changes tempo twice. It begins with a soft, straightforward oboe presence and a matching piano passage. The 1st tempo change introduces a more attacking and rugged theme. The last tempo change reintroduces the central theme until the end of the romance. Described as "the most rugged and colorful-sounding [romance]" and reminiscent of Brahms, the final fantasy is the liveliest of the set. There are many mood changes throughout the piece, with the A section being excited and the B section being reserved.

== Publication and performance history ==
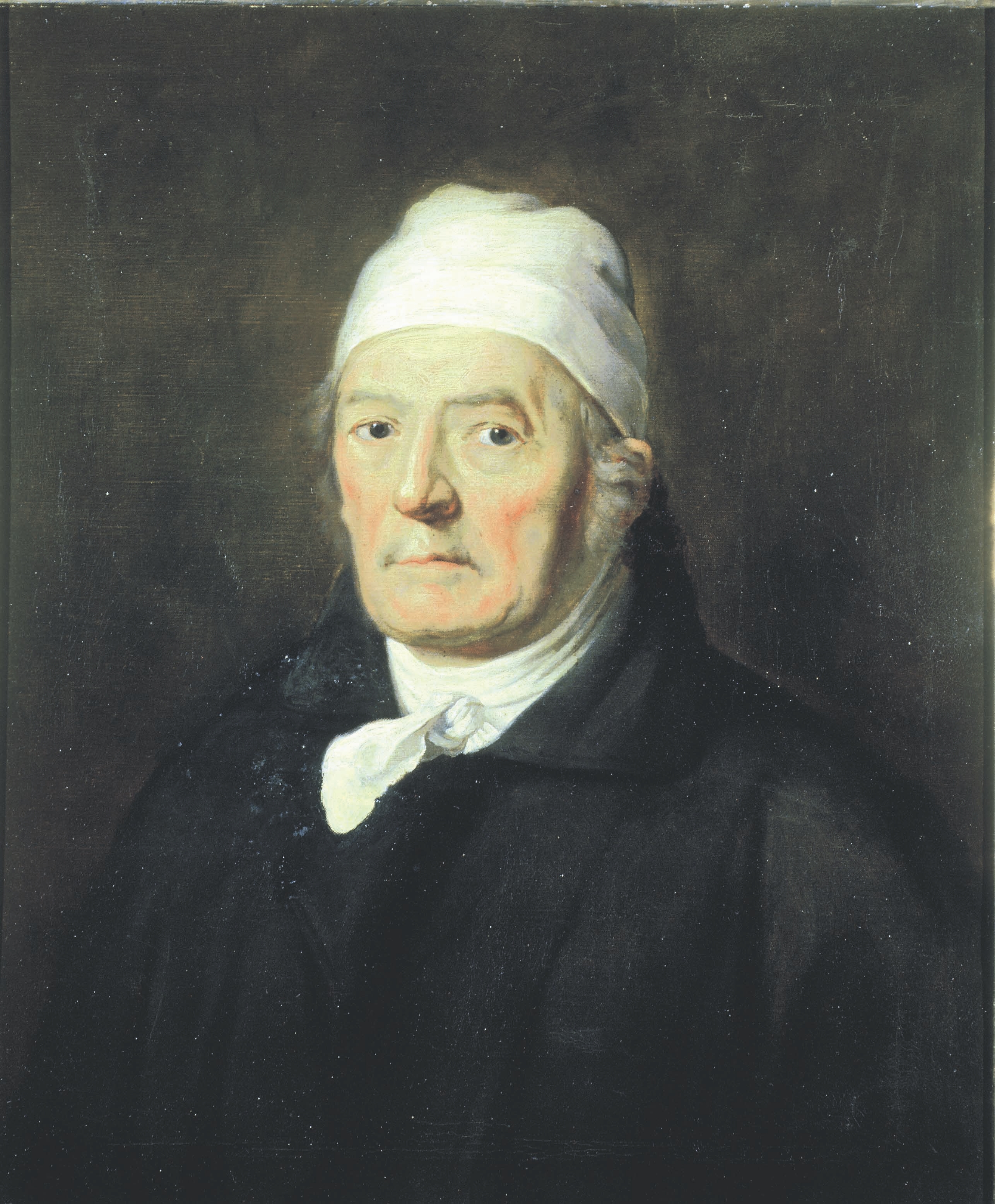
Nikolaus Simrock, who initially published the piece.

On November 2, 1850, the pieces were first performed privately as a piano and violin piece with Clara Schumann on piano and François Schubert on violin. The works were first performed several years after Schumann's death, in 1863; the performances took place on January 24 and February 14 in the Gewandhaus, featuring Emilius Lund on oboe and Carl Reinecke on piano.

The piece was dedicated to Wilhelm Joseph von Wasielewski. The original edition was published by N. Simrock. The publication date is unknown, but it is estimated to have been anywhere from December 1850 to February 1851. Nikolaus Simrock wrote a letter to Schumann on November 19, 1850, asking whether or not Schumann "would agree if we were to print on the title page: 'for oboe and pianoforte' and on this with a violin 'for violin and pianoforte' and on the third 'for clarinet and pianoforte,' since it is not looked upon with favor when several instruments appear on the title page." However, Schumann denied the request, replying, "If I had originally written the work for violin or clarinet, it would have become a completely different piece. I regret not being able to comply with your wishes, but I can do no other." Two copies of the original printing exist Schumann's copy and Wasielewski's dedication copy (both either in museums or private collections).

Disobeying Schumann's wishes, Simrock published alternate violin and oboe parts in the first edition. In her compilation of Robert's works post-mortem, Clara only included the violin transcription, possibly due to her only playing the piece with violinists. There have been several recordings of the music, including a recent one along with other Schumann oboe works by Oboe Classics.

== Sources ==
- 3 Romances, Op.94: Scores at the International Music Score Library Project
