= Piano Trio No. 3 (Schumann) =

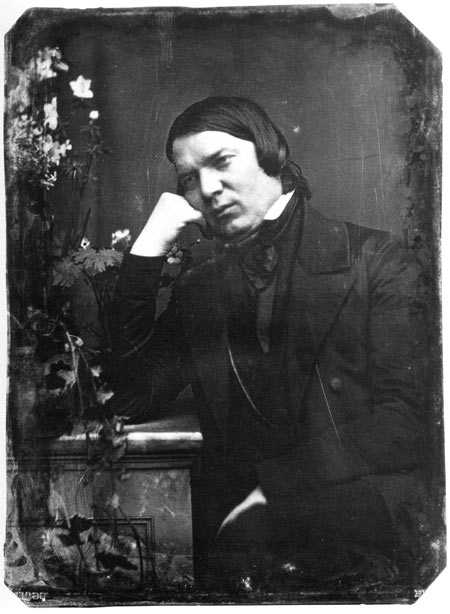
Robert Schumann in an 1850 daguerreotype

Robert Schumann's Piano Trio No. 3, Op. 110, in G minor was written in 1851. It has four movements:

1. Bewegt, doch nicht zu rasch in G minor, in 6/8 time (with tempo dotted quarter notes 63 to the minute). In sonata form.
2. Ziemlich langsam in E♭ major, in 12/8 time and tempo 116 eighth notes to the minute.
3. Rasch in C minor, in 2/4 time and 138 quarter notes to the minute. A scherzo with two trios, with a tempo marking of Etwas zurückhaltend bis zm langsameren Tempo leading into the first trio, in C major with an upward chromatic theme, and a second trio in A♭ major which is more markedly rhythmic and diatonic in character.
4. Kräftig, mit Humor in G major, in common (4/4) time and 104 quarter notes to the minute. There is a prominent episode in this rondo which quotes the C major trio from the scherzo (now in D major).

The work was written in Düsseldorf, and first rehearsed there in mid-November 1851. It was first performed publicly in Leipzig in 1852 and dedicated to Niels Gade. It was not given its first Carnegie Hall performance in New York City until 1958, by the Trio di Bolzano.

This year 1851 was a busy one for Schumann, in which he also revised his 1841 symphony in D minor, and wrote his Violin Sonatas #1 & #2, a number of songs and choral works including Der Rose Pilgerfahrt, and also composed his overtures Julius Caesar and Hermann und Dorothea.

== Discography ==
- Schumann: Piano Trios 1 & 3 (no. 1 Op. 63, no. 3 Op. 110); The Benvenue Fortepiano Trio; Avie Records, AV 2210, 2010.
- Schumann: The Complete Piano Trios / Piano Quartet, Op. 47 / Piano Quintet, Op. 44, Beaux Arts Trio, Phillips B0000041N8
- Schumann: Piano Trios, Israel Piano Trio, CRD 2413
- Schumann: The Complete Piano Trios, Piano Quartet, Piano Quintet, Trio Wanderer, Harmonia Mundi, B08WKSQSZJ
- Schumann: Complete Works for Piano Trio Leiv Ove Andsnes, Christian Tetzlaff, Tanja Tetzlaff Warner Classics.50999 0 94180 2
