= Three Fantasiestücke, Op. 111 =

- by Robert Schumann
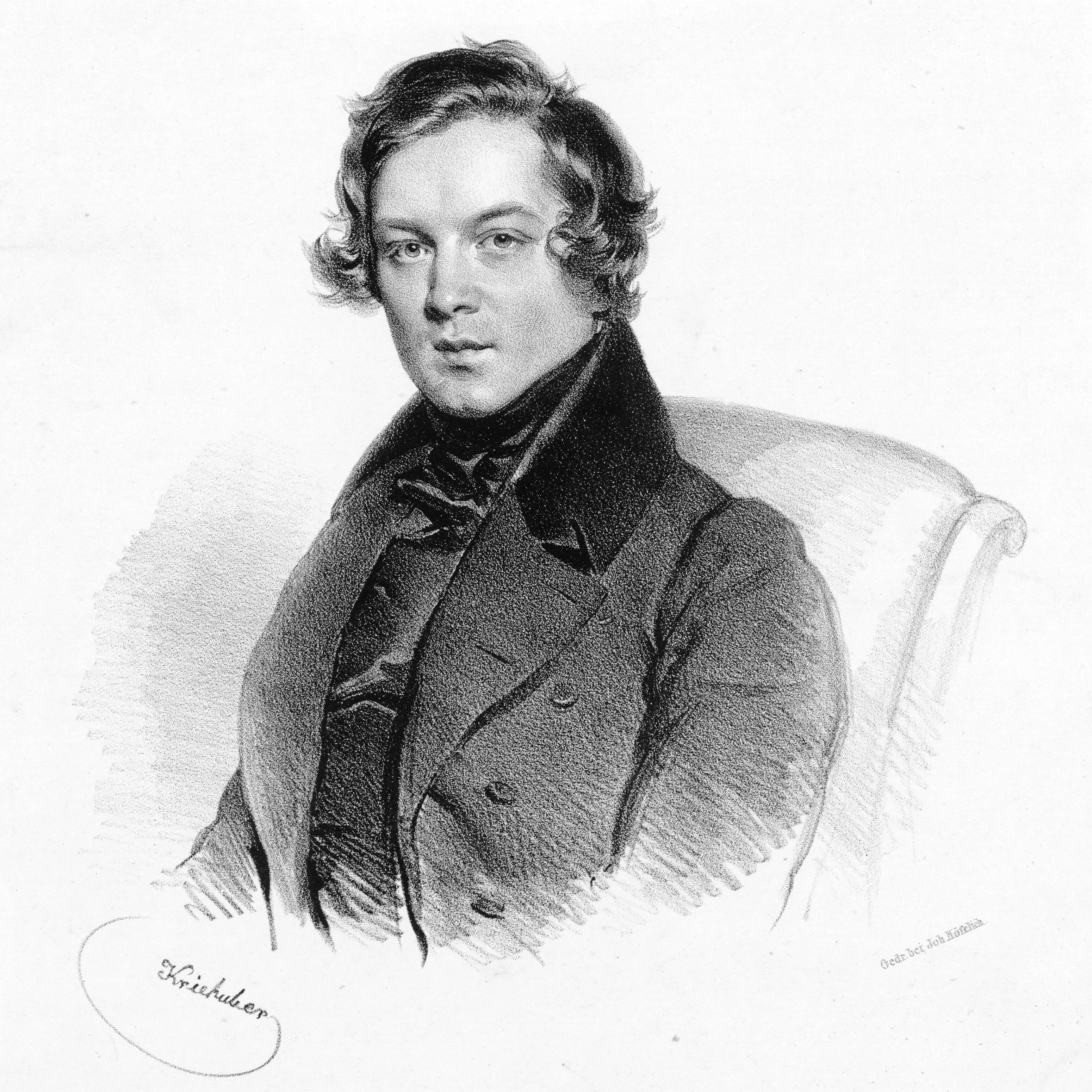
- Robert Schumann, lithograph by Josef Kriehuber (1839)
- Genre: Piano work
- Composed: September 1851
- Performed: Clara Schumann
- Duration: 10–12 minutes
- Movements: 3

Three Fantasiestücke for piano, Op. 111, were written in 1851 by Robert Schumann.

== History ==
=== Title ===
Three Fantasiestücke for piano, Op. 111, composed in 1851, is one of four works by Schumann entitled Fantasiestücke. The other three are:

- Fantasiestücke, Op. 12 (1837), eight pieces for solo piano, also based on Hoffmann's Fantasy Pieces in Callot's Manner
- Fantasiestücke, Op. 73 (1849), three pieces for clarinet and piano (ad.lib violin or cello)
- Phantasiestücke, Op. 88 (1842), for piano, violin and cello in four movements

The title was inspired by the collection of letters and writings about music published in 1814–1815, Fantasy Pieces in Callot's Manner by E. T. A. Hoffmann, one of Schumann's favourite authors. The composer greatly appreciated the 17th-century engraver's sense of fantasy.

Three Fantasiestücke, Op. 111 (8 pages PDF)

=== Composition ===
Schumann composed the Op. 111 in 1851, a few months after his appointment as Generalmusikdirektor of the Düsseldorf Orchestra. In September, Clara Schumann wrote in her diary: "Robert has composed three piano pieces of a grave and passionate character which I like very much."

=== Inspiration ===
In these three pieces, Schumann recaptures the "passionate tone that was characteristic of the Fantasiestücke, Op. 12, composed fourteen years earlier in 1837.

They reveal "the composer's ardour, impetuosity and inner youth, followed by a contemplative and peaceful atmosphere". He is said to have written them as a tribute to Beethoven's Opus 111, the Piano Sonata No. 32, because of his predilection for this work.

== Details ==
=== Duration ===
Schumann gave precise indications concerning the tempo, but each pianist adapts it according to his temperament. As a result, the total duration of the performance of the three pieces is variable, between 10 and 12 minutes.

=== Short description ===
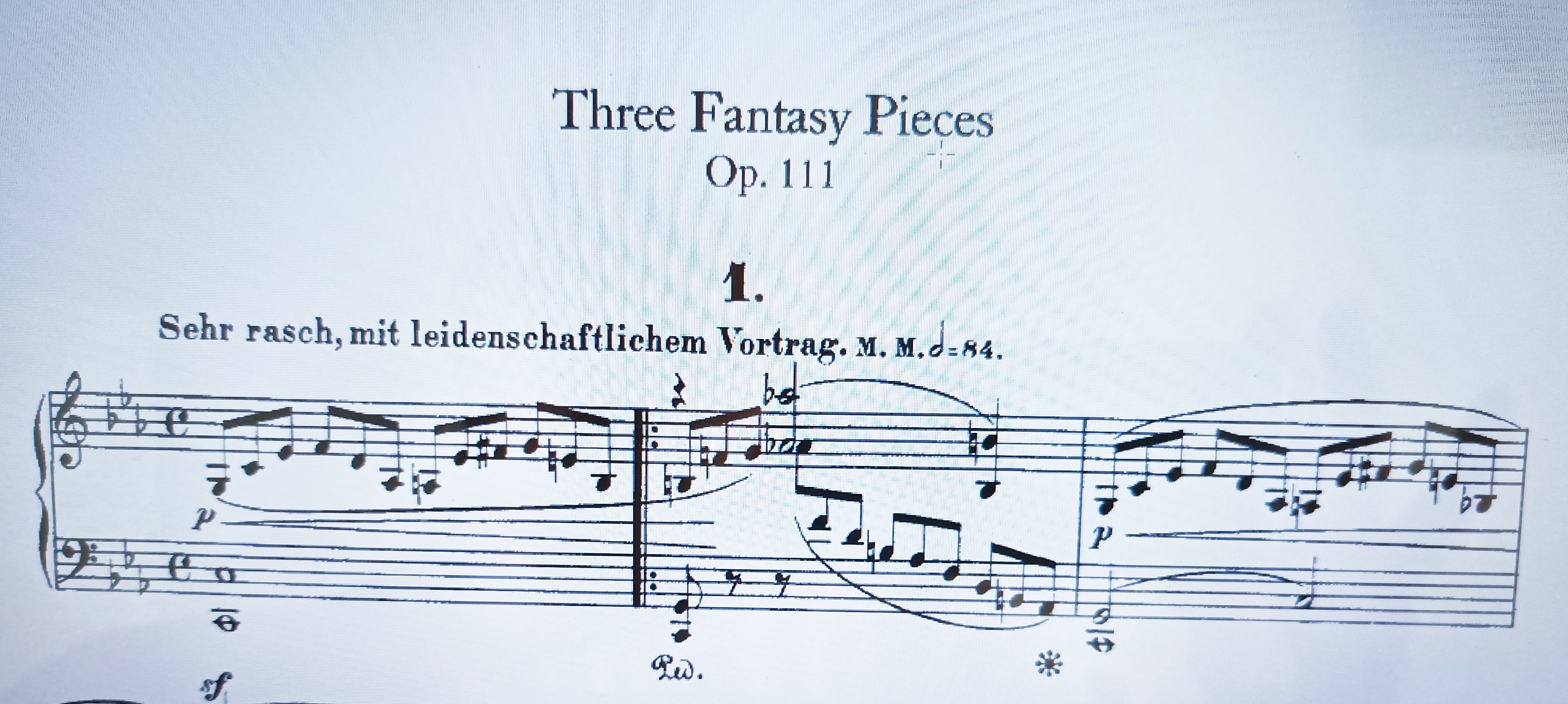

The two pianists James Friskin and Irwin Freundlich present the Three Fantasiestücke for piano, Op. 111 as follows: "These short pieces were intended to be played in sequence; but this does not seem absolutely essential."

1. Sehr rasch, mit leidenschaftlichem Vortrag [Very quickly, with passionate expression] ( Molto vivace et appassionatamente) in C minor

This has a fine passionate sweep and displays much of Schumann's old power and inspiration; it is technically fairly taxing.
Duration: 2–3:45 minutes

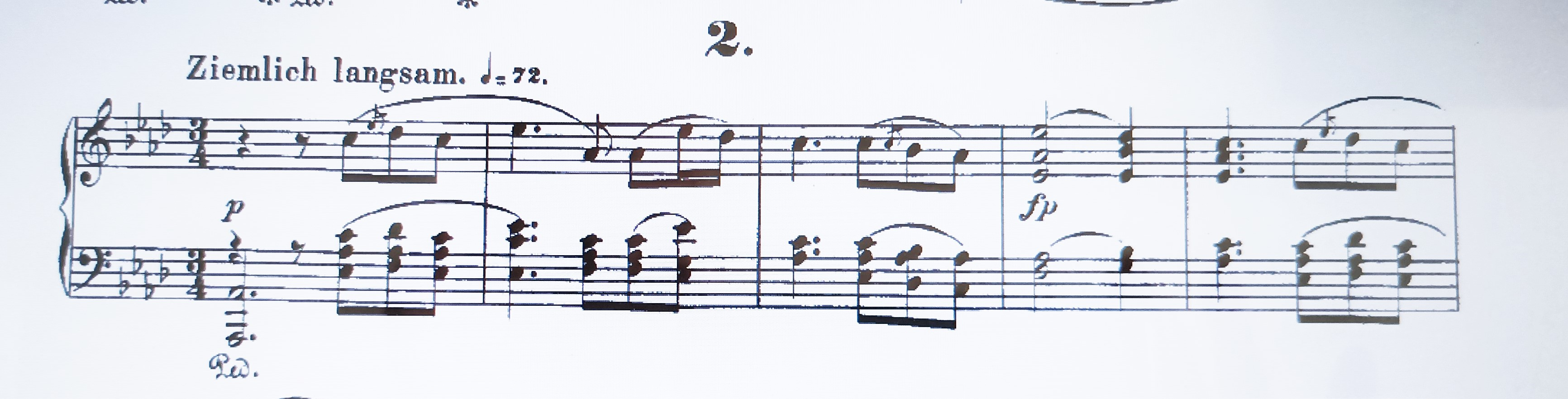

2. Ziemlich langsam (Quite slow) (Piuttosto lento), in A-flat major

Lyrically beautiful and technically simple.
Duration: 4:45 / 5:35 minutes

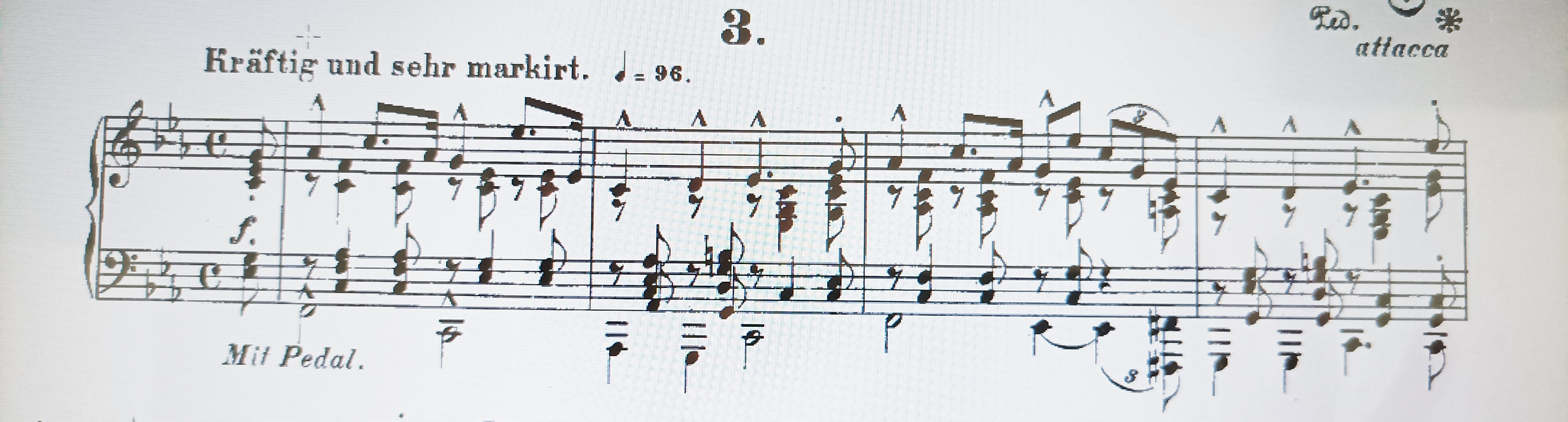

3. Kräftig und sehr markirt [Powerful and very marked] (Con forza, assai marcato), in C minor

An energetic marchlike tune, with contrasting middle section and coda featuring graceful arabesques.
Duration: 3:15 / 3:45 minutes

== Selected recordings ==
- Claudio Arrau, Edition Schumann, compilation (7 CDs), 1991, opus 111 : CD 6-Track 2, Philips Classics Records 432308–2, Germany ..
- Maria Grinberg, The Art of Maria Grinbert, recordings from 1946 to 1976 (34 CDs), 2019 (opus 111: CD20), Scribendum SC814EAN 5060028048144.
- Andreas Haefliger, Schumann :Plusieurs pièces pour piano, 1988 (Schumann, several pieces for piano, 1988), Sony Classical 8869774024.
- Vladimir Horowitz, The Unreleased Live Recordings, 1966-1983, Sony Classical 88843054582.
- Antonín Kubálek, Piano music of Robert Schumann ( several pieces including opus 111), 1988, Dorian DOR-90116.
- Kun-Woo Paik, Schumann, 2020, Deutsche Grammophon UPC 00028948551460.
- Éric Le Sage, Schumann project: The Complete Piano Solo Music (opus 111: CD 6 tracks 10-12), 2012, Alpha, EAN 3760014198137.

== See also ==
- List of compositions by Robert Schumann
