= Waldszenen =

Set of Piano Pieces by Robert Schumann

- Cycle by Robert Schumann
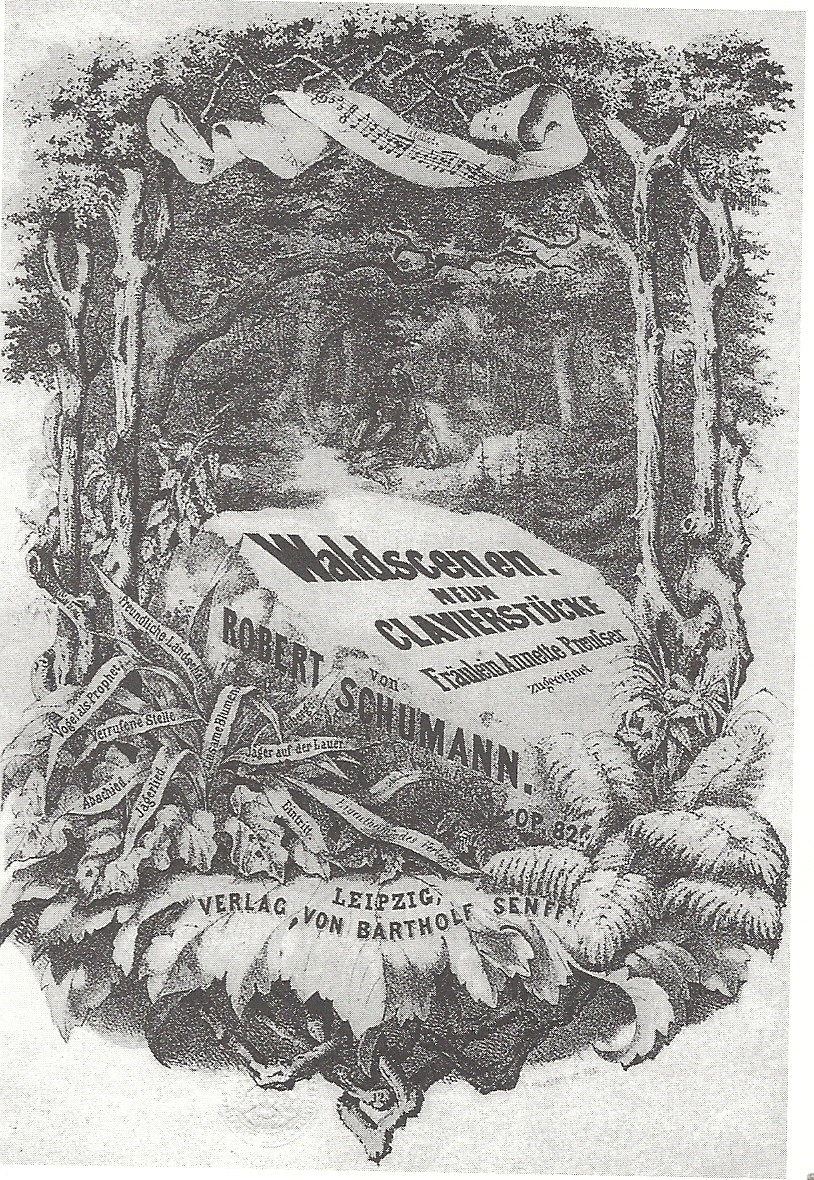
- First edition title page, 1850–51
- English: Forest Scenes
- Opus: 82
- Composed: 1848–49
- Published: Leipzig, 1850–51
- Publisher: Bartholf Senff
- Duration: c. 22 minutes
- Movements: 9 pieces
- Scoring: Solo piano

Waldszenen (Forest Scenes), Op. 82, is a set of nine short solo piano pieces composed by Robert Schumann in 1848–1849, first published in 1850–1851 in Leipzig by Bartholf Senff.

On the set, Schumann wrote:

The titles for pieces of music, since they again have come into favor in our day, have been censured here and there, and it has been said that 'good music needs no sign-post.' Certainly not, but neither does a title rob it of its value; and the composer, by adding one, at least prevents a complete misunderstanding of the character of his music. What is important is that such a verbal heading should be significant and apt. It may be considered the test of the general level of the composer's education.

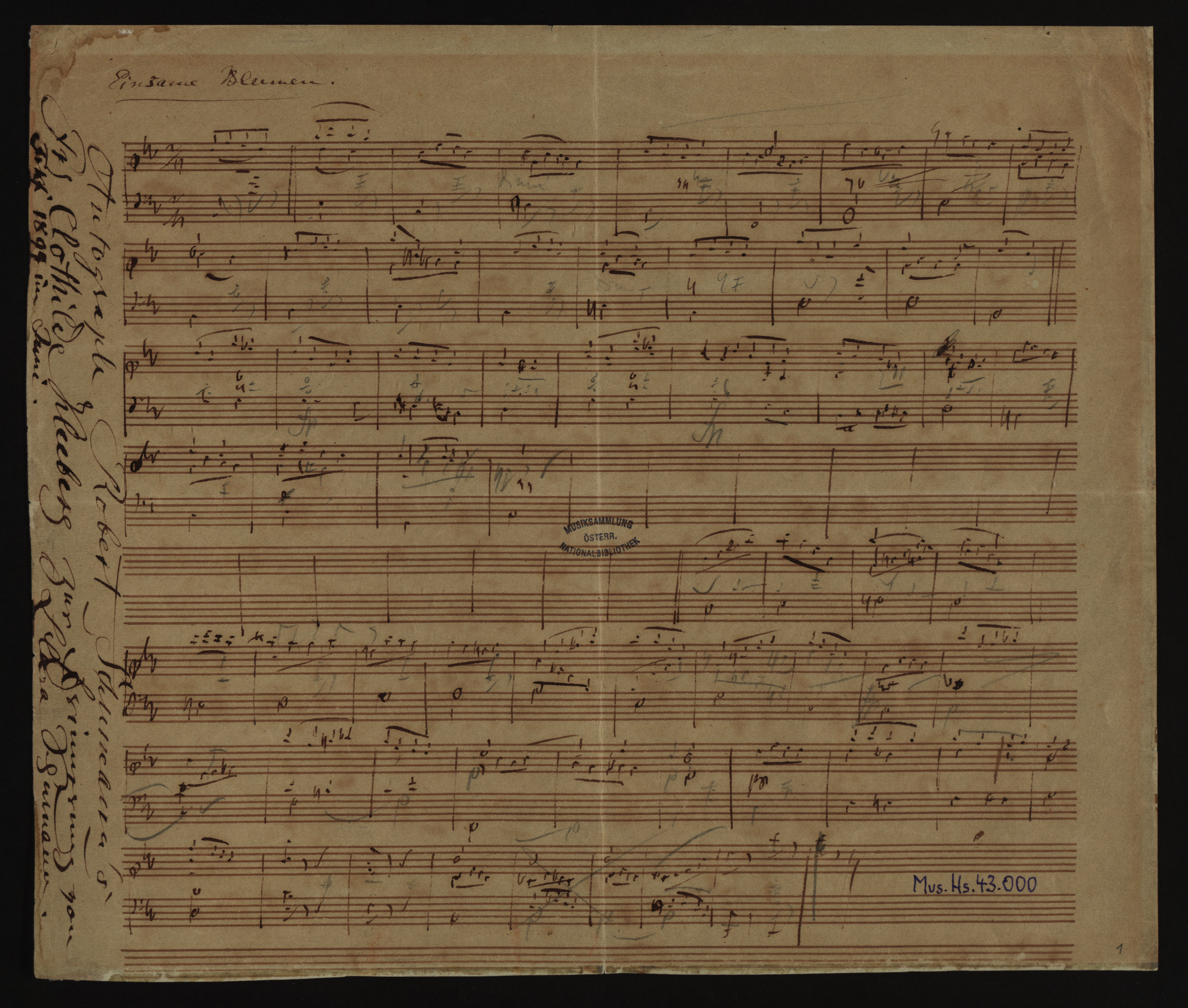
Schumann's draft of No. 3, "Einsame Blumen"

== Movements ==
The nine movements are shown in the table below.

No.	Title	Approximate duration (mins)	Key signature
1	Eintritt (Entry); Nicht zu schnell – Not too fast	2:10	B♭ major
2	Jäger auf der Lauer (Hunters on the Lookout); Höchst lebhaft – Very lively	1:18	D minor
3	Einsame Blumen (Lonely Flowers); Einfach – Simple	2:17	B♭ major
4	Verrufene Stelle (Haunted Place); Ziemlich langsam – Pretty slow	3:07	D minor
5	Freundliche Landschaft (Friendly Landscape); Schnell – Fast	1:07	B♭ major
6	Herberge (Wayside Inn); Mäßig – Moderate	2:02	E♭ major
7	Vogel als Prophet (Bird as Prophet); Langsam. Sehr zart – Slow, very tender	3:20	G minor
8	Jagdlied (Hunting Song); Rasch, kräftig – Fast, strong	2:29	E♭ major
9	Abschied (Farewell); Nicht schnell – Not fast	3:29	B♭ major

== Recordings ==
Pianist	Piano	Label	Recording year
Penelope Crawford	Conrad Graf (1835)	Musica Omnia	1998
Jan Vermeulen	Johann Nepomuk Tröndlin (1830–1835)	Accent	2010
Andreas Staier	Érard (1837)	Harmonia Mundi	2007
Tobias Koch	Erard (1852)	Genuin	2008
Ziad Kreidy	Erard (1852)		2017
Can Çakmur	Shigeru Kawai SK-EX Concert Grand Piano	Bis	2026
