= Nachtlied (Schumann) =

Tone poem for chorus and orchestra by Robert Schumann

- by Robert Schumann
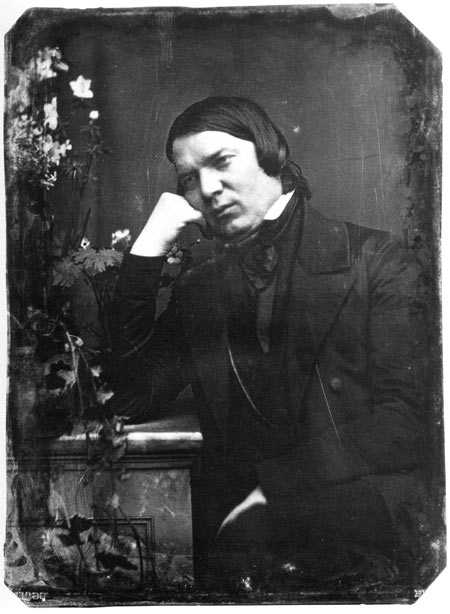
- Schumann in an 1850 daguerreotype
- Key: D minor
- Opus: 108
- Period: Romantic
- Genre: Tone poem
- Text: "Nachtlied" by Friedrich Hebbel
- Language: German
- Composed: 1849
- Dedication: Friedrich Hebbel
- Published: 1852
- Duration: c.10–12 minutes
- Scoring: Choir and orchestra

Nachtlied, Op. 108, is a tone poem by Robert Schumann for choir and orchestra with text from a poem of the same name by Friedrich Hebbel. The work was composed in 1849 and published in 1852. A performance lasts for approximately 10 to 12 minutes.

== Characteristics ==
The work is scored for an eight-part mixed choir without soloists, and an orchestra. Although not explicitly segregated, the work has three distinct sections based on the verses of the original poem. In the first section, a polyphonic structure is established with competing melodic lines from the chorus. In the second, the instrumental writing becomes muddier and more urgent. In the final section, the piece abruptly modulates to D major from its original key in D minor and an echo of the word Schlaf (sleep) is heard in the chorus. The end is dream-like, invoking a descent into sleep.

== Relation to Hebbel ==
Schumann met Hebbel in 1847 and was honored by the visit, according to his diary. After finishing the tone-poem two years later, Schumann sent Hebbel a copy of the score and wrote, "I would have preferred to have enclosed an orchestra with winds blowing and strings bowing, along with a chorus in order to be able to lull the poet into lovely dreams with his own song." Schumann marked his piece Dem Dichter gewidmet (dedicated to the poet).

== Text ==
Quellende, schwellende Nacht,
Voll von Lichtern und Sternen:
In den ewigen Fernen,
Sage, was ist da erwacht?

Herz in der Brust wird beengt;
Steigendes, neigendes Leben,
Riesenhaft fühle ich's weben,
Welches das meine verdrängt.

Schlaf, da nahst du dich leis,
Wie dem Kinde die Amme,
Und um die dürftige Flamme
Ziehst du den schützenden Kreis.

Rising and burgeoning night,
full of lights and stars;
in the eternal far-away distance
tell us: what has been awakened?

Heart and chest are tightening,
ascending, declining life;
I feel its gigantic web
weaving to displace me.

Sleep, now you come near me softly
like the nursemaid to the child,
and around the sparse flame
you draw a guarding circle.
