= Variations on the name "Abegg" =

Piano composition by Robert Schumann

- by Robert Schumann
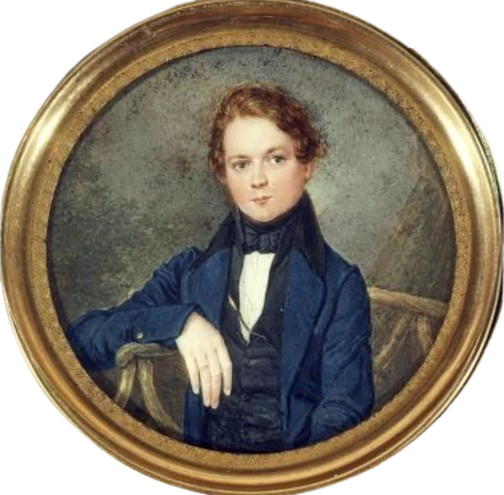
- Schumann as an adolescent
- Key: F major
- Opus: 1
- Composed: 1829–30
- Duration: 8 minutes
- Movements: Theme with 5 variations
- Scoring: Solo piano

The Variations on the name "Abegg" in F major, Op. 1, is a piece (theme with variations) for piano by Robert Schumann, composed between 1829 and 1830, while as a student in Heidelberg. The name is believed to refer to Schumann's fictitious friend, Meta Abegg, whose surname Schumann used through a musical cryptogram as the motivic basis for the piece. The name Meta is considered to be an anagram of the word "tema" (Latin). Another suggestion is Pauline von Abegg. Apparently, when he was twenty years old, Schumann met her and dedicated this work to her, as witnessed in Clara Schumann's edition of her husband's piano works.

The first five notes of the theme are A, B♭ (B), E, G, and G. This use of pitch names as letters was also used by Schumann in other compositions, such as his Carnaval.

It is composed of:

Thema (Animato) (F major)
Variations:
1. (energico, F major)
2. (il Basso parlando, F major)
3. (corrente, F major)
4. (cantabile, A-flat major)
5. (Finale alla Fantasia. Vivace, F major)

The opening measures are as follows:
