= Piano Sonata No. 3 (Schumann) =

Composition for piano by Robert Schumann

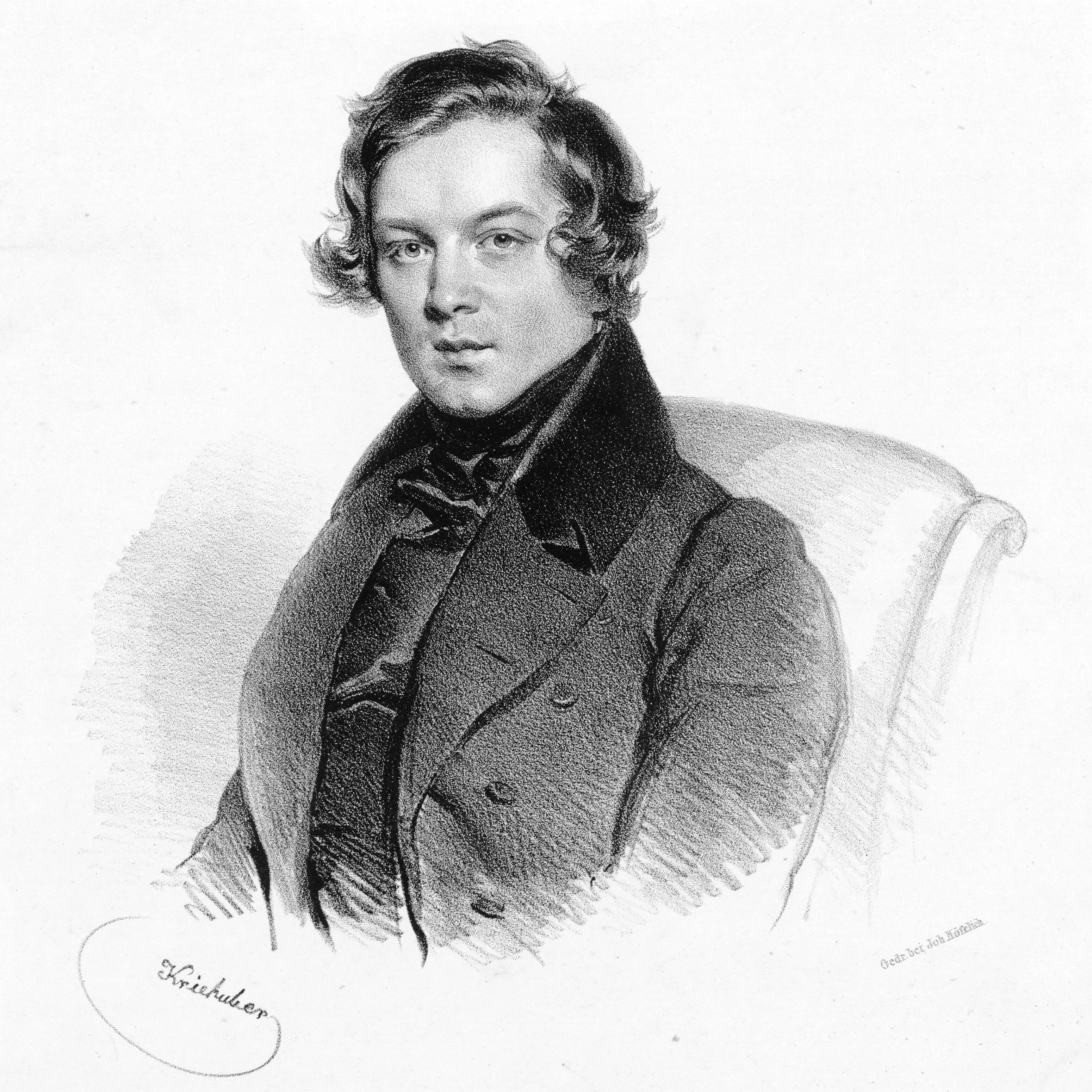
Portrait of Robert Schumann, c. 1839

The Piano Sonata No. 3 in F minor, Op. 14, called "Concerto for piano without orchestra" by Tobias Haslinger, was composed by Robert Schumann in 1836 and dedicated to Ignaz Moscheles, to whom in a letter he comments "what crazy inspirations one can have." In 1853, Schumann revised the work and added a scherzo as a second movement, which the performer could choose to play, or not play.

The autograph manuscript of the sonata is preserved in the British Library.

== Movements ==
The sonata has four movements:

1. Allegro brillante (F minor)
2. Scherzo. Molto commodo (D♭ major)
3. Quasi variazioni. Andantino de Clara Wieck (F minor)
4. Prestissimo possibile (F minor, ends in F major)

The work, in general, is a typical sonata with some surprises such as Clara Schumann's andantino. The final movement is reminiscent of his Kreisleriana, Op. 16. This movement ends with a coda in F major concluding the work in a brilliant and powerful way.

Many pianists such as Vladimir Horowitz, Grigory Sokolov, András Schiff, and Maurizio Pollini have interpreted it.
