= Der Handschuh (Schumann) =

1850 German lied by Robert Schumann

Der Handschuh (Tran: The Glove) is a German lied written by Robert Schumann and published in 1850 as his Op.87. The song's text is the eponymous poem by German poet Friedrich Schiller, written in 1797 as part of a ballad competition alongside friend and colleague Johann Wolfgang von Goethe.

Schumann began studying Schiller's work in 1825 when he formed a collaborative literary association. Following the publication of 'The Glove,' Schumann later used Schiller's play, "Bride of Messina," as the thematic basis of his Op.100 overture.

== Recordings ==
- 2021: "Schumann: Alle Lieder" (Sony, Christian Gerhaher and Gerold Huber)

== Links ==
- IMSLP
