= Missa sacra (Schumann) =

Mass for Chorus and Orchestra Op. 147 by Robert Schumann

Missa Sacra
- by Robert Schumann
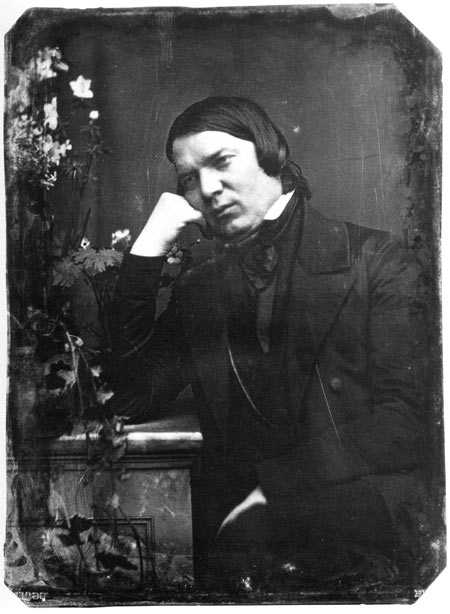
- Schumann in an 1850 daguerreotype
- Key: C minor
- Opus: 147
- Period: Romantic
- Genre: Mass
- Language: Latin
- Composed: 1852 - 1853
- Published: 1862
- Duration: 45 minutes
- Movements: 6
- Scoring: Choir & Orchestra

Missa sacra, also called Mass in C minor, Op. 147 is a six movement work by Robert Schumann for choir and orchestra. The work was originally composed in 1852 and 1853 and fully published in 1862, six years after the composer's death. The work runs approximately 45 minutes.

== Characteristics ==
The work follows a traditional Catholic or Latin mass with a generally diatonic tone. It utilizes counterpoint that was uncharacteristic of its era, possibly the result of Schumann's study of Bach and Palestrina.

The work was originally created in five movements, with the offertorium added by the composer later. Two versions of the offertorium are regularly performed. One of which is written for solo soprano, cello, and muted strings. The other uses a solo soprano accompanied by an organ.

== Structure ==
The work consists of six movements:

1. Kyrie
2. Gloria
3. Credo
4. Offertorium
5. Sanctus
6. Agnus Dei
