= Neujahrslied (Schumann) =

Songs for chorus and orchestra Op. 144 by Robert Schumann

- by Robert Schumann
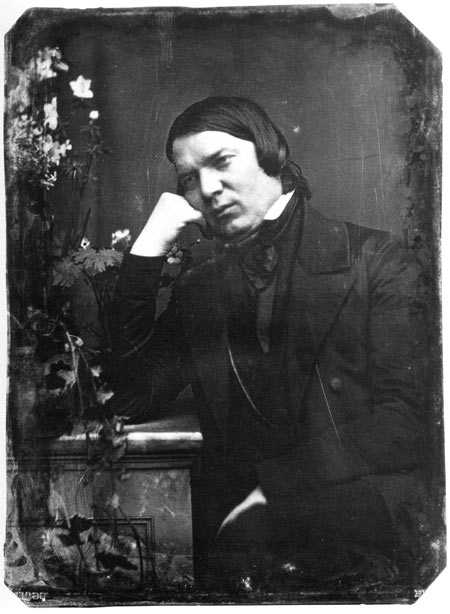
- Schumann in an 1850 daguerreotype
- English: New Year's Song
- Key: E-flat major
- Opus: 144
- Period: Romantic
- Genre: Choral music
- Language: German
- Composed: 1849
- Published: 1861
- Duration: 17 minutes
- Scoring: Choir & Orchestra

Neujahrslied (English: New Year's Song), Op. 144, is a set of seven songs by Robert Schumann for choir and orchestra. The work was originally composed in 1849 and fully published in 1861, five years after the composer's death. The work runs approximately 17 minutes.

== Characteristics ==
The work consists of seven sections, played one after the other without stopping. The text, by Friedrich Rückert, reminisces on the old year and looks forward to the coming one. As the piece progresses, it becomes more political, addressing a new ruler rather than a length of time.
