= Piano Trio No. 2 (Mendelssohn) =

Piano trio by Felix Mendelssohn

Piano Trio in C minor
- No. 2
- by Felix Mendelssohn
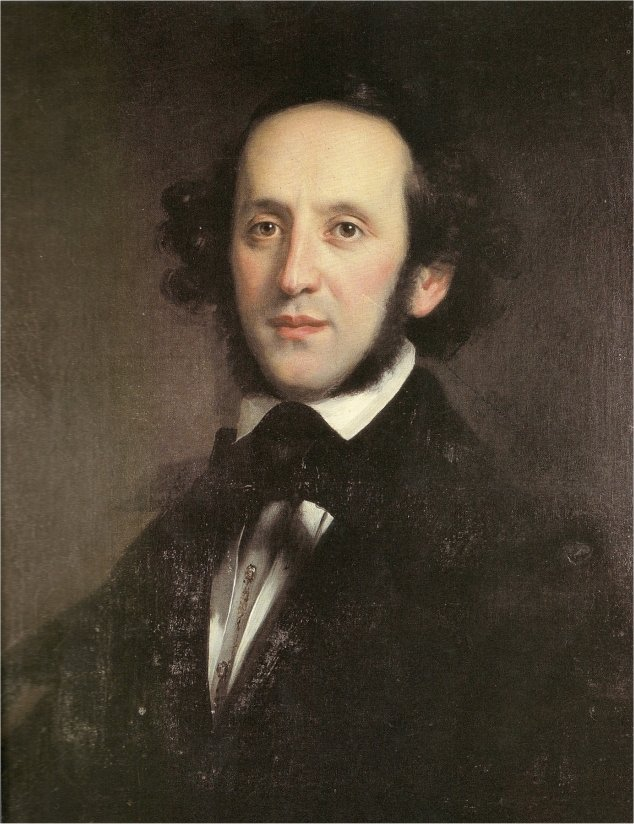
- The composer in 1846, portrayed by Eduard Magnus
- Key: C minor
- Opus: 66
- Composed: 1845
- Dedication: Louis Spohr
- Movements: four

The Piano Trio No. 2 in C minor, Op. 66, was written by Felix Mendelssohn in 1845 and published in February 1846. The work is scored for a standard piano trio consisting of violin, cello and piano. Mendelssohn dedicated the work to his close friend and violinist, Louis Spohr, who played through the piece with the composer at least once.

== Background ==
In 1845, Mendelssohn began his composition of the second piano trio in Frankfurt. Knowing of his stay in Frankfurt, many visitors would seek out Mendelssohn, including an English student named W. S. Rockstro. Presented with this young student, Mendelssohn invited him, along with violinist Ferdinand David, to read through parts of his new piano trio. Dedicated to Louis Spohr and presented to Fanny Mendelssohn on her birthday, the trio was finished in on April 30, 1846.

The trio offered inspiration to Johannes Brahms, with the opening theme of the finale being referenced in the scherzo of his Piano Sonata No. 3, Op. 5, as well as the opening of the first movement of this trio being the basis for the piano line in the finale of his Piano Quartet No. 3 in C minor, Op. 60.

== Movements ==
External audio
- Performed by the Trio Wanderer
- I. Allegro energico e con fuoco
- II. Andante espressivo
- III. Scherzo: Molto allegro quasi presto
- IV. Finale: Allegro appassionato

The trio has four movements:

1. Allegro energico e con fuoco (C minor)
2. Andante espressivo (E♭ major)
3. Scherzo: Molto allegro quasi presto (G minor)
4. Finale: Allegro appassionato (C minor, ending in C major)

A typical performance lasts just under 30 minutes.

=== I. Allegro energico e con fuoco ===

One of Mendelssohn's most notable uses of sonata form, the first movement of the piano trio begins with a stormy texture built on arpeggios in all three voices that call upon Mendelssohn's Hebrides overture and Scottish Symphony. The primary theme of the first movement quotes Mendelessohn's Lieder Ohne Worte (Songs without Words), Op. 102, No. 1. The overall harmonic scheme of the movement moves from the tonic in the primary theme to the mediant in the secondary theme and closes in the dominant.

=== II. Andante espressivo ===

The second movement presents a lullaby in the piano, borrowing its rhythmic movement from Mendelssohn's Lieder Ohne Worte, Op. 19, No. 6 ("Venetian Boat Songs"). The gentle entry of the violin and cello on top of the rocking line in the piano turns the movement into a Duett ohne Worte.

=== III. Scherzo: Molto allegro quasi presto ===

Described by Mendelssohn as "a trifle nasty to play," the scherzo movement follows a rondo design full of imitative passages being passed through the three instruments. Reminiscent of a trifle, the three instruments enter offset by an eighth note in the fast moving line, creating a stacking effect. As seen in Mendelssohn's early scherzi, the playful and wild manner of the movement keeps its high energy until the very end. The high energy of the movement has been likened to that of Mendelssohn's A Midsummer Night's Dream scherzo, while also featuring motives that harken back to the scherzo in Mendelssohn's Octet. The music abruptly softens, ending on crisp pizzicato chords.

=== IV. Finale: Allegro appassionato ===

Regarded as the most famous movement from the trio, the fourth movement of the trio opens with an unusual leap in the cello. A notable feature of the finale of this work is its use of the melody of a chorale. After the introduction of the initial theme, the work quotes Gelobet seist du, Jesu Christ, and then expands to also include a sixteenth-century Genevan psalter tune, known in English as Old Hundredth from its association with the Psalm 100 (William Kethe), as the culminating melody.
