= Symphony No. 4 (Schumann) =

Last published symphony by Robert Schumann

- by Robert Schumann
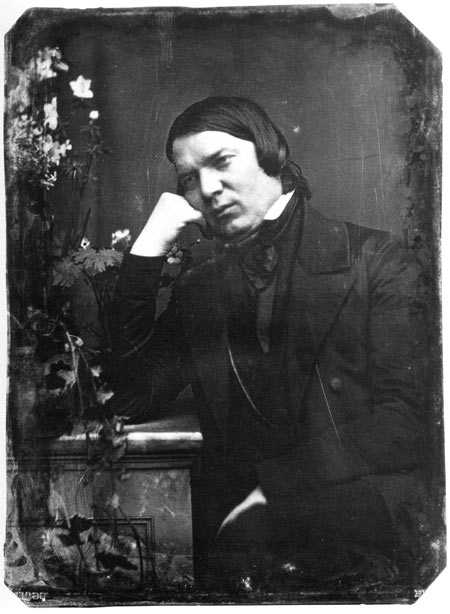
- Schumann in an 1850 daguerreotype
- Key: D minor
- Opus: 120
- Composed: 1841 (revised 1851)
- Published: 1853
- Publisher: Breitkopf & Härtel
- Duration: Around 30 minutes
- Movements: 4
- Scoring: Orchestra

Premiere
- Date: 6 December 1841; 3 March 1853 (revised version)
- Location: Leipzig Gewandhaus
- Conductor: Ferdinand David
- Performers: Leipzig Gewandhaus Orchestra

The Symphony No. 4 in D minor, Op. 120, composed by Robert Schumann, was first completed in 1841. Schumann heavily revised the symphony in 1851, and it was this version that reached publication.

Clara Schumann, Robert's widow, later wrote on the first page of the score to the symphony—as published in 1882 as part of her husband's complete works (Robert Schumanns Werke, Herausgegeben von Clara Schumann, published by Breitkopf & Härtel)—that the symphony had merely been sketched in 1841 but was only fully orchestrated ("vollständig instrumentiert") in 1851. However, this was untrue, and Johannes Brahms, who greatly preferred the earlier version of the symphony, published that version in 1891 despite Clara's strenuous objections.

== Music ==
External audio
- Performed by the Staatskapelle Dresden under Wolfgang Sawallisch
- I. Ziemlich langsam - Lebhaft
- II. Romanze (Ziemlich langsam)
- III. Scherzo
- IV. Langsam - Lebhaft - Schneller - Presto

The work is scored for two flutes, two oboes, two clarinets, two bassoons, four horns, two trumpets, three trombones, timpani, and the usual strings.

The 1851 (published) version of the work is in four movements which follow each other without pause:

1. Ziemlich langsam — Lebhaft (D minor — D major)
2. Romanze: Ziemlich langsam (A minor — A major)
3. Scherzo: Lebhaft (D minor — Trio in B♭ major)
4. Langsam — Lebhaft (D major)

The 1841 version, however, used Italian rather than German tempo indications, with the four movements as follows:

1. Andante con moto — Allegro di molto (D minor — D major)
2. Romanza: Andante (A minor — A major)
3. Scherzo: Presto (D minor — Trio in B♭ major)
4. Largo — Finale: Allegro vivace (D major)

Schumann's biographer Peter Ostwald comments that this earlier version is "lighter and more transparent in texture" than the revision, but that Clara "always insisted that the later, heavier, and more stately version [of 1851] was the better one.". Both Bernard Shore and Donald Tovey wrote analyses of the symphony and preferred the earlier orchestration while noting the improved integration of the revision, suggesting that the revised structure could profitably be paired with the original scoring as far as possible. Schumann's deficiencies as a conductor led to him doubling entries between parts, so that the score became "playable but opaque".

The symphony is highly integrated for its time, with thematic material recurring between movements. The slow introduction to the first movement reappears early in the second movement, and then has a violin arabesque based on it. A modification of this arabesque then appears in the trio section of the scherzo. The slow introduction to the finale and its main opening theme incorporate phrases from the main theme of the first movement, in different tempi. Dramatic chords from the first movement also reappear in the finale. Tovey described the overall structure as "possibly Schumann's greatest and most masterly conception".

The scherzo borrows some notes from the third part of Symphony No. 1 in F minor, Op. 7 (1824) by Johann Wenzel Kalliwoda (1801–1866), whom Schumann admired. Schumann may also have borrowed a melody that appears in the first and fourth movements from the continuous string accompaniment for "Siehe! wir preisen selig" ("Happy and blest are they"), the final chorus in scene one of Felix Mendelssohn's oratorio "St. Paul," a work which Schumann praised in a letter dated March 2, 1839.
