= Violin Sonata No. 2 (Schumann) =

Violin Sonata
- No. 2
- by Robert Schumann
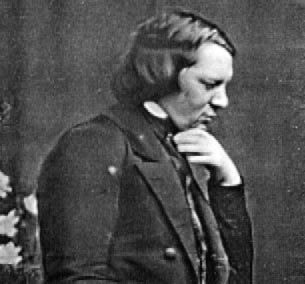
- Schumann c. 1850
- Key: D minor
- Opus: 121
- Composed: November 1851
- Dedication: Ferdinand David
- Performed: 29 October 1851: Düsseldorf
- Movements: 4

The Violin Sonata No. 2 in D minor, Op. 121, by Robert Schumann was completed in November 1851, Dedicated to the violinist Ferdinand David, the sonata received its first public performance from Clara Schumann and Joseph Joachim on 29 October 1853 in Düsseldorf, in a concert that marked the beginning of a long term musical collaboration.

== Music ==
The work is in four movements:

1. Ziemlich langsam – lebhaft
2. Sehr lebhaft
3. Leise, einfach
4. Bewegt

The first movement begins with a stately sequence of chords, the contour of which is then used for the first subject proper. The fourth bar of this theme contains a distinctive syncopated rhythm that plays a role in the link to the second subject, and is also used extensively in the development.

The vigorously driving second movement in B minor (♯vi in relation to the home key) is of the scherzo genre, and appears to have influenced the young Johannes Brahms, particularly in the C minor scherzo he wrote for the F-A-E Sonata. Near the end of this movement, the chorale melody "Gelobet seist du, Jesu Christ" is quoted triumphantly in the major.

The relatively serene G major third movement is a set of variations, opening with a passage of violin pizzicato triple-stops, mirroring the chordal introduction of the first movement.

The finale returns to the key and mood of the beginning, with a long and dramatic trajectory toward an exuberant conclusion in the major.
