= Adagio and Allegro for Horn and Piano =

Musical composition by Robert Schumann

Adagio and Allegro
- by Robert Schumann
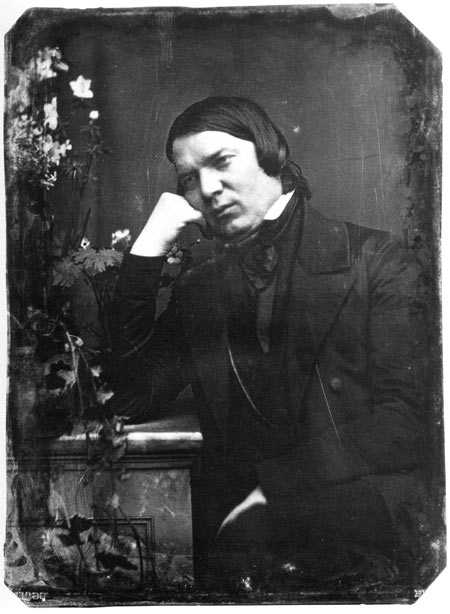
- 1850 daguerreotype of Schumann
- Native name: Adagio und Allegro
- Key: A♭ major
- Opus: 70
- Composed: February 1849
- Duration: c. 8–10 minutes
- Movements: 2
- Scoring: Horn and piano

The Adagio and Allegro (German: Adagio und Allegro) in A♭ major, Op. 70, is a chamber work for piano and horn (optionally cello, double bass, viola or violin) by Robert Schumann, written in February 1849. Schumann planned alternative editions before it was printed in which the horn or cello or violin could be replaced. The title was initially intended to be "Romance and Allegro". Schumann then decided on "Adagio and Allegro".

Shortly after this work was completed, Clara Schumann commented that it was "just the sort of piece that I like, brilliant, fresh and passionate."

== Recordings ==
Below are incomplete lists of recordings on both period and modern instruments.

=== Recordings on period instruments ===
Year	Performer	Instrument	Piano accompanist	Album title	Label	Notes
2004	Lisa Marie Landgraf	Violin	Tobias Koch	Robert Schumann: Complete Works for Violin and Pianoforte	Genuin	
2008	Luc Bergé	Horn	Jan Michiels	O, du schöner Hörnerklang	Fuga Libera	
2011	Thomas Hauschild	Horn	Tobias Koch	Musikalische Morgenunterhaltung	Raumklang	Allegro only
2011	France Springuel	Cello	Jan Vermeulen	Schumann: Works for Cello and Piano	Etcetera Records	
2012	Gudrun Schaumann	Violin	Wolfgang Brunner	The Circle of Robert Schumann, Vol. 2	Capriccio	
2016	Alec Frank-Gemmill	Horn	Alasdair Beatson	A Noble and Melancholy Instrument: Music for Horn and Piano	BIS Records	
2017	Alexander Rudin	Cello	Aapo Häkkinen	Schumann: Fantasies and Fairy Tales - Chamber Works	Naxos	
2019	Steinar Granmo Nilsen	Horn	Kristin Fossheim	The Horn in Romanticism	2L	
2020	Renée Allen	Horn	Zvi Meniker	Salonmusik für Waldhorn, Vol. 1	Arcantus	

=== Recordings on modern instruments ===
Year	Performer	Instrument	Piano accompanist	Label
1981	Mstislav Rostropovich	Cello	Martha Argerich	Deutsche Grammophon
1988	Yo-Yo Ma	Cello	Emanuel Ax	Sony Classical
1992	József Kiss	Oboe	Jenő Jandó	Naxos
1995	Douglas Boyd	Oboe	Maria João Pires	Deutsche Grammophon
1996	Ádám Friedrich	Horn	Sándor Falvai	Hungaroton
1996	Truls Mørk	Cello	Leif Ove Andsnes	Simax
1997	Paul van Zelm	Horn	Leo van Doeselaar	Etcetera
1998	David Pyatt	Horn	Martin Jones	Erato
2004	Wolfgang Tomboeck	Vienna horn	Madoka Inui	Naxos
2006	Radek Baborák	Horn	Kazune Shimizu	Cryston (Octavia Records)
2011	Karine Georgian	Cello	Jan Willem Nelleke	Naxos
2013	Felix Klieser	Horn	Christof Keymer	Berlin Classics
2014	David Alonso	Horn	Hélène Tysman	Indésens
2016	Rob van de Laar	Horn	Thomas Beijer	Challenge Classics
2016	Daniel Müller-Schott	Cello	Robert Kulek	Orfeo
2019	Gautier Capuçon	Cello	Martha Argerich	Erato
2019	Richard Watkins	Horn	Julius Drake	Signum Records
2021	Philip Dukes	Viola	Peter Donohoe	Chandos
2023	Louis-Philippe Marsolais	Horn	David Jalbert	ATMA Classique
