= Piano Trio No. 1 (Schumann) =

1847 composition by Robert Schumann

Piano Trio in D minor
- No. 1
- by Robert Schumann
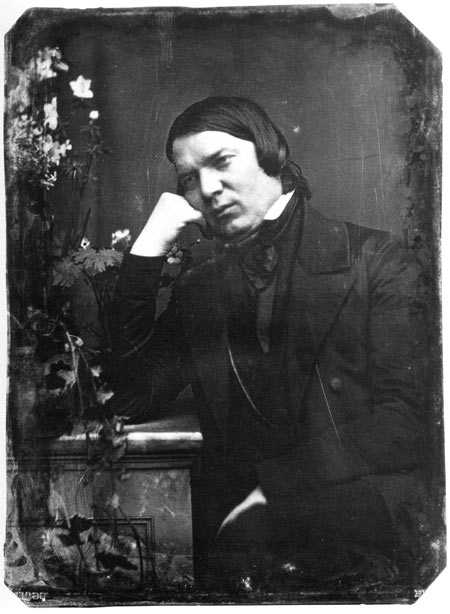
- The composer in 1850
- Key: D minor
- Opus: 63
- Composed: 1847
- Movements: four

The Piano Trio No. 1 in D minor, Op. 63, by Robert Schumann was written in 1847. It has four movements:

1. Mit Energie und Leidenschaft [With energy and passion]
2. Lebhaft, doch nicht zu rasch [Vivid, but not too fast]
3. Langsam, mit inniger Empfindung [Slow, with deep feeling]
4. Mit Feuer [With fire]

This piano trio (the first of three such works, and Fantasiestücke, Op. 88, for the same forces) is in an intensely romantic style, and is the most celebrated of Schumann's trios in the modern repertoire. The opening movement begins with a surging theme that is heard in counterpoint initially between the piano's bass and the violin; the scherzo's driving dotted rhythm shares its smoothly ascending contour with the flowing trio section. The third movement features a duet between violin and cello, and moves without pause to the heroic tonic-major, D major, finale.
