= Johannes Verhulst =

Dutch composer and conductor

Johannes Verhulst

Johannes Josephus Hermanus Verhulst (March 19, 1816, in The Hague – January 17, 1891, in The Hague) was a Dutch composer and conductor. As a composer mainly of songs and as administrator of Dutch musical life, his influence during his lifetime was considerable.

== Life ==
As a boy, Verhulst sang in a Catholic choir; here he distinguished himself by his gift for music. In his teens, he succeeded in becoming a first violinist in the court chapel of King William I. In 1836, Felix Mendelssohn, who was on holiday in Scheveningen, was shown an overture written by Verhulst, and took him as a pupil; he began studying with Mendelssohn in 1838.

In Leipzig, Verhulst was appointed as conductor of the Euterpe orchestra, for which he wrote his Symphony in E minor. King William II urged him to return to The Hague in 1842, where he dedicated himself to the writing of Dutch songs for some time. Six years later, he became the chief conductor of the Rotterdam Music Society (Maatschappij tot Bevordering der Toonkunst). For the celebration of its fifty-year anniversary in 1854, he succeeded in engaging many prominent musicians, such as Franz Liszt.

The following years would bring a number of other appointments: 1860 as conductor of concerts at the scientific society Diligentia Society in The Hague, and 1864 at both the orchestral society Caecilia and the Felix Meritis Society in Amsterdam. By accepting these positions, Verhulst had acquired a great amount of power and influence on Dutch music life. However, his conservative taste led to an increasing amount of criticism, particularly his refusal to endorse or execute performances of the music of Berlioz, Franz Liszt, and most of all Wagner. If orchestra directors wished to see works by these composers performed, they had to handle the organisation themselves and engage a guest conductor - and risk the wrath of Verhulst, which could be considerable. This led to a public backlash, and in 1883 Diligentia imposed Richard Hol as a substitute conductor for performances of Wagner. In 1886, Verhulst was appointed an honorary member of Diligentia on the occasion of his seventieth birthday, but the membership was revoked after less than three months. Hereupon he withdrew from his other positions and from public life. He died in the town of Bloemendaal, aged 74.

== Work ==
Verhulst wrote dozens of songs in the tradition of Franz Schubert and Robert Schumann, usually on texts provided by the Dutch author J. P. Heije. The textual quality of these songs is doubtful, but no-one can question the appropriateness of Verhulst's music. Key features of his works are a typical use of chromaticism and long preludes and epilogues. His best songs approach the level of his idol, Robert Schumann. He also wrote sacred music (e.g. the (at least) 3 Masses, Opus 20, 50 and 55), chamber works including three string quartets and orchestral music (several overtures, among which the Gijsbrecht van Aemstel overture, and a Symphony in E minor, Opus 46). Most of his compositions stem from the time before his activities as a conductor and organiser.

Robert Schumann's Overture, Scherzo and Finale is dedicated to Verhulst.
