= Merkt =

Merkt is a surname. Notable people with the surname include:

- Irmgard Merkt (born 1946), German music educator
- John L. Merkt (1946–2009), American politician
- Rick Merkt (born 1949), American politician, attorney, and businessman

== See also ==
- Mert (given name)
