= Gotthelf Leberecht Glaeser =

German painter

- Born: 11 July 1784; Pegau, Electorate of Saxony
- Died: 19 May 1851 (aged 66); Langen, Hesse
- Education: Johann Friedrich August Tischbein

Gotthelf Leberecht Glaeser (11 July 1784 – 19 May 1851) was a German painter of the Biedermeier movement.

== Life and works ==
He was born in Pegau (Ehrenfriedersdorf/Erzgebirge), where his parents were the cantor Johann Friedrich Gotthelf Glaeser (1755–1814) and his wife Christiane Hübler (d. 1814).

According to Georg Kaspar Nagler, he was a student of Friedrich August Tischbein in Leipzig, but was also influenced by Anton Graff. In 1812, he became court painter in Darmstadt. In 1817 he married Margarethe Elisabeth Frey (d. 1854), the daughter of a local innkeeper. Together the couple would go on to have eight children.

- Sophia Elisabetha (b. 1818); married to Ludwig Lang with issue
- Hermann Carl Wilhelm Georg
- Friederike Auguste Charlotte (b. 1828)
- Johanne Babette Ernestine (1829–1837)

From 1820 to 1823 he lived in Frankfurt am Main. During this time or shortly thereafter, some allegorical and religious depictions emerged, which differed from his other works. The first mention of his office as Grand Ducal Hessian court painter dates from 1825. In Darmstadt he was a member of the local Masonic lodge Johannes Evangelist Eintracht.

Glaeser specialized in portraiture and seems to have mainly worked in the medium of oil and pastels. On the early courtly portraits until about 1820, delicate colors dominate. Influences of the 18th century can still be seen here and his style was compared to Anton Graff due to his unpretentious and objective style. The decade between 1820 and 1830 was regarded as the culmination of his creative art, in which expressed a soulful realism, according to Heinrich Ragaller. The only self-portrait he painted dates to 1833, when his painting became more fragmented and phased. The later works from the 1840s were perceived as flatter and colder than the earlier ones.

Around 1810, he created a portrait of Christiane Schumann, the mother of the composer Robert Schumann. Also, he portrayed Ludwig Pfister, who was particularly known for the pursuit of the Hölzerlipsbande. Among the well-known figures painted by Glaeser were the Grand Duchess Luise and Prince Christian of Hesse-Darmstadt as well as other members of the court, as well as bourgeois and the publisher August Schumann.

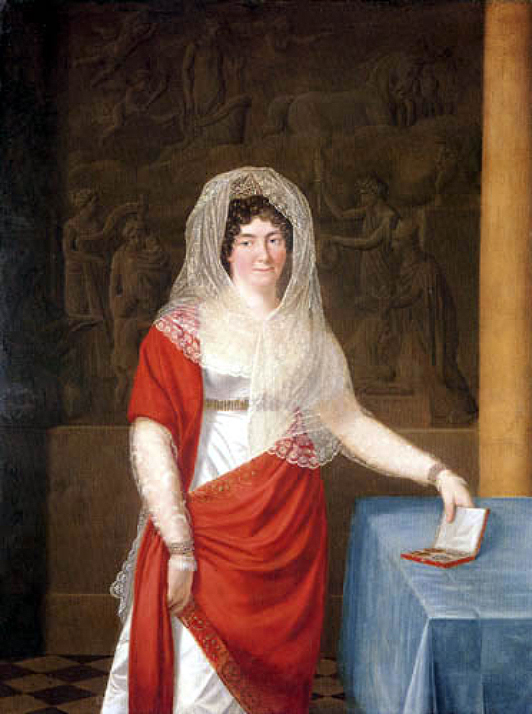
Luise of Prussia (1827)

Numerous works of Glaesers are shown in the Darmstadt castle museum as well as in the Hessian national museum, Darmstadt. The Jewish Museum in New York has five pictures of works on which he represented members of the Reiss family. He had some of his works reproduced by lithography.

Glaeser died in 1851 in Langen. Glaeserweg is named for him, in Darmstadt-Arheilgen.
