= Glaeser =

Glaeser is a surname. Notable people with the surname include:

- Bertha Lund Glaeser (1862-1939), American physician
- Edward Glaeser (born 1967), American economist
- Ernst Glaeser (1902–1963), German author
- Gotthelf Leberecht Glaeser (1784–1851), German painter
- Matt Glaeser (born 1985), American soccer player and coach
- Robert Glaeser (born 1937), American biochemist

== See also ==
- Glaser
