= Christiane Schumann =

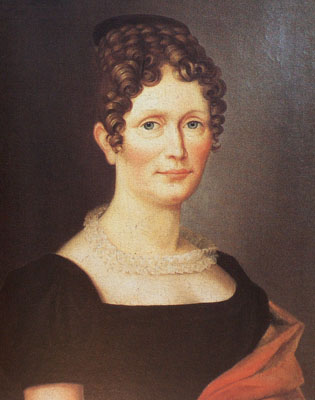
Christiane Schumann in 1810. Oil painting by Gotthelf Leberecht Glaeser

Christiane Schumann, née Schnabel (28 November 1767 – 4 February 1836), was the wife of August Schumann (1773–1826) and mother of the composer Robert Schumann (1810–1856). The entire surviving correspondence between Christiane Schumann and her son was scientifically processed and published in 2020 as part of the Schumann edition.

== Life and work ==
Born in Karsdorf, Johanna Christiana (later name: Johanne Christiane) Schnabel was the eldest daughter of Abraham Gottlob Schnabel (1737–1809) and Johanna Sophia Schnabel née Lessing (1745–1818), and a great-niece of Gotthold Ephraim Lessing. Her maternal grandfather was Carl Heinrich Lessing (1713–before 1767), who was a second cousin to the famous German poet. She had ten siblings, but only four of them reached adulthood. Her father served in the Electorate of Saxony's army as a field surgeon in Karsdorf and settled in Zeitz in 1768 as a city and council surgeon.

On the 25th October 1795 in Geußnitz near Zeitz she married August Schumann (1773–1826), who had come to Zeitz in 1793 as a book trade assistant and lived as a subtenant in Abraham Schnabel's house at Altmarkt 3. The couple lived in Ronneburg in the following years, where August Schumann opened a bookstore, in which Christiane Schumann also took on activities and dealt personally with customers, including Johann Gottlieb Fichte. In 1808 the family moved to Zwickau. There, August Schumann continued the publishing bookstore under the name "Brothers Schumann".

The marriage produced five children: Emilie (1796–1825), who is said to have shown features of "quiet madness" in her youth and took her own life in 1825, Eduard (1799–1839), Carl (1801–1849), Julius (1804–1833) and Robert (1810–1856).

Due to an illness of Christiane Schumann, which was described as "nervous fever", Robert was cared for as a small child, probably from 1814 to 1816, by his godmother Eleonora Carolina Elisabeth Ruppius, the wife of the Zwickau "legal consultant and city magistrate" Carl Heinrich Ruppius. Christiane Schumann was described by Robert Schumann's biographer Wilhelm Joseph von Wasielewski as an engaging phenomenon that had a "certain talent for representation" and in later years had been of "enthusiastic, sentimental exaggeration, combined with momentary vehemence". According to her own statement, she gladly and sang a lot and was called "the living aria book".

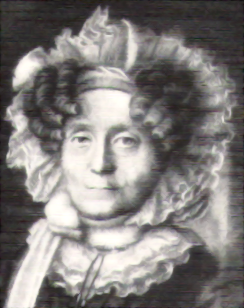
Christiane Schumann c. 1830, detail of an anonymous miniature

She initially promoted Robert Schumann's musical talent which enabled him to receive piano lessons from the Zwickau organist Johann Gottfried Kuntsch at the age of seven. After the death of her husband in 1826, leaving her a considerable fortune, she chose a legal career for her son together with Robert's guardian, the merchant Johann Gottlob Rudel. She was opposed to his wish of a musical education; she wanted to spare him the "starvation" of an artist. However, Robert Schumann abandoned his law studies, which he had begun in 1828, and in 1830 he finally decided to pursue music. In his important letter to the Mother of 30 July 1830, he wrote: "Now I stand at the crossroads and I am horrified by the question: Where to? - If I follow my genius, it will lead me to art, and I believe to the right path." Despite worrying and concerns, Christiane Schumann sent a letter to Friedrich Wieck, who had already taught Robert Schumann with piano lessons from August 1828 to February 1829, and asked for his assessment of the future artistic career of her son. Wieck eventually received Robert Schumann as a student in Leipzig.

Christiane Schumann followed the career of her son with interest, but also with some worries. With the departure of Robert Schumann from Zwickau in 1828 and the subsequent studies in Leipzig and Heidelberg, an extensive correspondence between mother and son began. In total, including two letters from 1817 and 1818, 65 letters from Robert Schumann to his mother and 37 letters from his mother to him have survived and were published in 2020 in the Schumann edition. The correspondence gives, among other things, insight into Robert Schumann's trips to southern Germany in 1828, to Italy in 1829, his study visits to Leipzig and Heidelberg, and his living conditions there. Robert Schumann also reported to his mother about the injury to his right hand, as a result of which he had to give up his virtuoso career as a pianist and devoted himself to composing. While he often put himself in the spotlight in his letters as a student and aspiring composer and did not always distinguish between pretense and reality, Christiane Schumann always appeared genuine in her correspondence. Overall, the correspondence documents a close relationship between the mother and her youngest son.

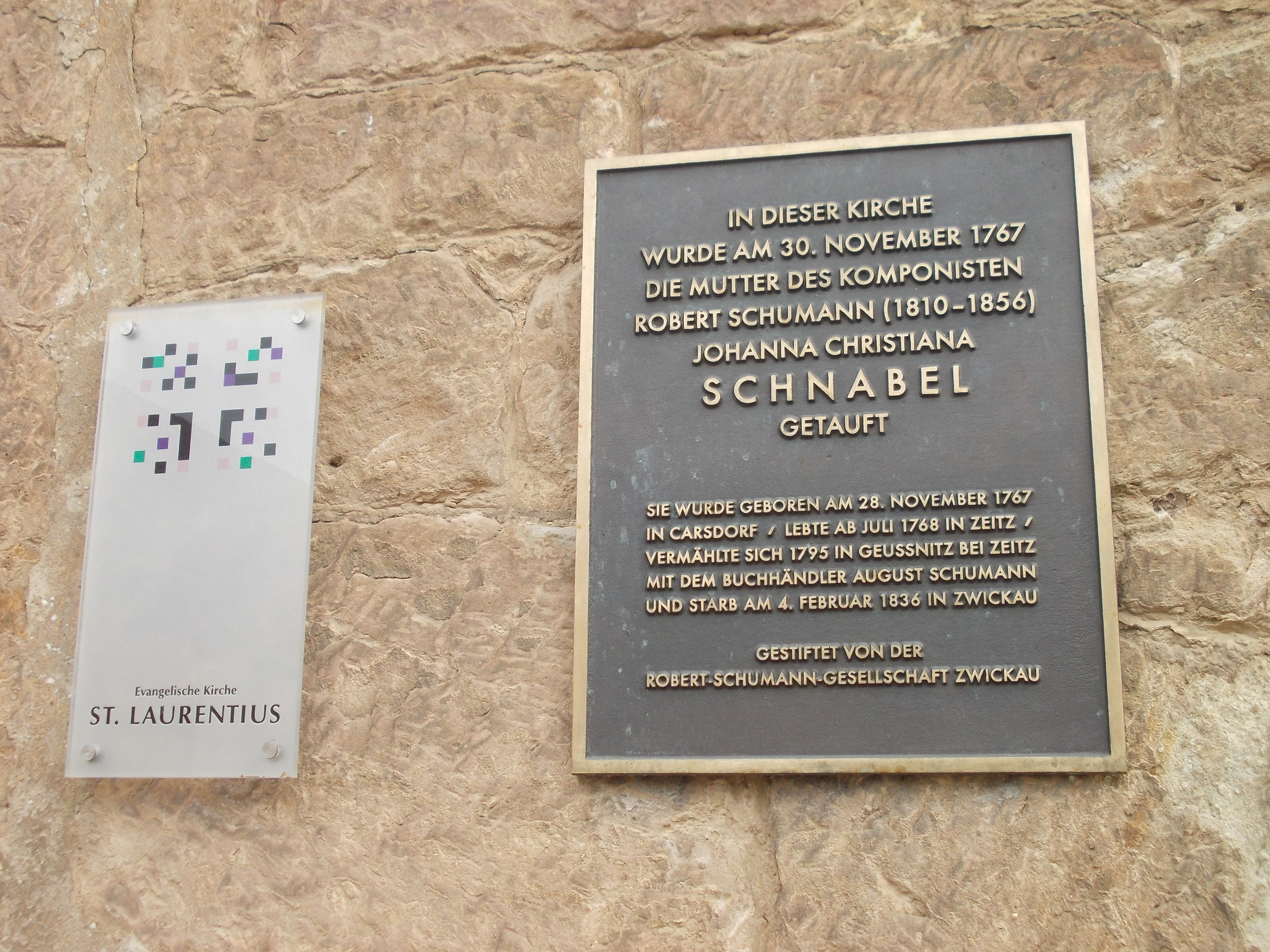
Memorial plaque for Johanna Christiana Schnabel

In a letter to Christiane Schumann from 31 December 1831 Robert Schumann wrote: "Your name, dear mother, should not be borne by a concerto or a rondo, but by a cheerful, pious, rich song - are you satisfied with that?" It was not until the year of Christiane Schumann's death that he partially fulfilled his promise. He sent her a printed copy of his Six Concert Etudes after Caprices by Paganini op. 10, published in December 1835, with the handwritten dedication "To my beloved mother. Robert Schumann."

In her last letter to Robert Schumann on December 13, 1835, Christiane Schumann described in detail her physical and mental suffering as well as her "long experiences and hard trials" in this regard. In her will of January 27, 1836, she named her "dear children and grandchildren" Eduard, Carl, Robert, Emilie, Richard and Mathilde Schumann as heirs with many detailed provisions "according to the legal order of succession". On 4 February 1836 Christiane Schumann died in Zwickau. In 2012, the Zwickau Schumann Society had a memorial plaque installed in her honor at the Protestant church of St. Laurentius in Karsdorf, where she had been baptized as Johanna Christiana Schnabel on 30 November 1767.

== See also ==
of the Wieck-Schumann family de.wikipedia.org
