= Kreisleriana =

1838 composition by Robert Schumann

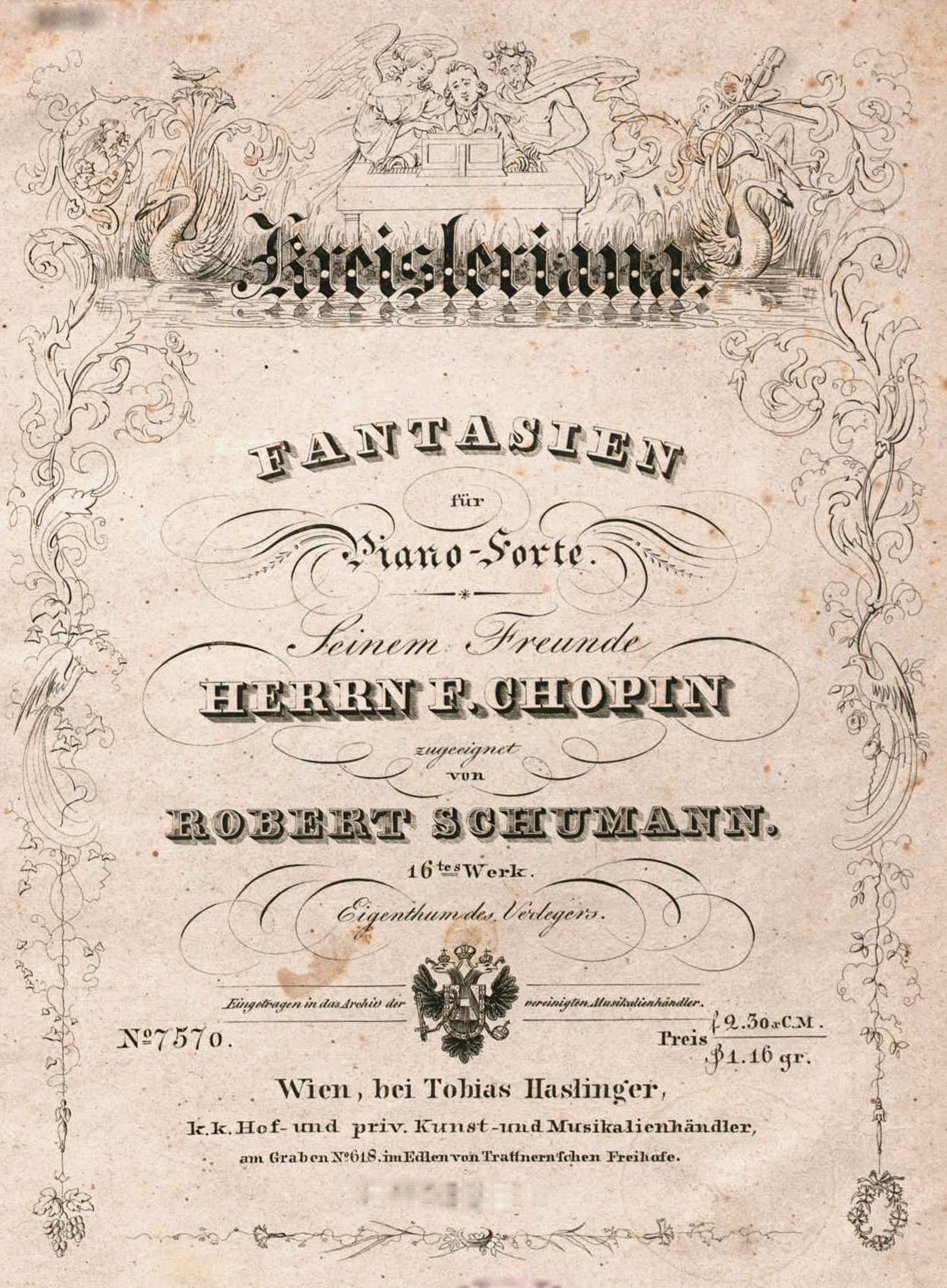
Title page from Schuman's Kreisleriana

Complete performance (31:39)
MIDI capture of a piano performance by Ran Jia (2009)

No. 1 "Äußerst bewegt"

No. 3 "Sehr aufgeregt"

No. 8 "Schnell und spielend"
Nos. 1, 3, 8 played by Giorgi Latso

Kreisleriana, Op. 16, is a composition in eight movements by Robert Schumann for solo piano, subtitled Phantasien für das Pianoforte. Schumann claimed to have written it in only four days in April 1838 and a revised version appeared in 1850. The work was dedicated to Frédéric Chopin, but when a copy was sent to the Polish composer, "he commented favorably only on the design of the title page".

== Movements ==
1. Äußerst bewegt (Extremely animated), D minor
2. Sehr innig und nicht zu rasch (Very inwardly and not too quickly), B♭ major. This movement in ABACA form, with its lyrical main theme, includes two contrasting intermezzi. In his 1850 edition, Schumann extended the first reprise of the theme by twenty measures in order to repeat it in full.
3. Sehr aufgeregt (Very agitated), G minor
4. Sehr langsam (Very slowly), B♭ major/G minor
5. Sehr lebhaft (Very lively), G minor
6. Sehr langsam (Very slowly), B♭ major
7. Sehr rasch (Very fast), C minor/E♭ major
8. Schnell und spielend (Fast and playful), G minor. Schumann used material from this movement in the fourth movement of his first symphony.

== Analysis ==
Kreisleriana is a very dramatic work and is viewed by some critics as one of Schumann's finest compositions. In 1839, soon after publishing it, Schumann called it in a letter "my favourite work", remarking that "The title conveys nothing to any but Germans. Kreisler is one of E. T. A. Hoffmann's creations, an eccentric, wild, and witty conductor." In 1843, when he had moved from writing for solo piano to much larger works, in particular Paradise and the Peri, he still listed it as one of his best piano works.

The work's title was inspired by the character of Johannes Kreisler from works of E. T. A. Hoffmann. Like the kaleidoscopic Kreisler, each number has multiple contrasting sections, resembling the imaginary musician's manic depression, and recalling Schumann's own "Florestan" and "Eusebius", the two characters Schumann used to indicate his own contrasting impulsive and dreamy sides. Johannes Kreisler appears in several books by Hoffmann, including Kater Murr and most notably in the "Kreisleriana" sections of Fantasy Pieces in Callot's Manner, published in 1814.

In a letter to his wife Clara, Schumann reveals that she figured prominently in the composition of Kreisleriana:

I'm overflowing with music and beautiful melodies now – imagine, since my last letter I've finished another whole notebook of new pieces. I intend to call it Kreisleriana. You and one of your ideas play the main role in it, and I want to dedicate it to you – yes, to you and nobody else – and then you will smile so sweetly when you discover yourself in it.
