= Overture, Scherzo and Finale =

Orchestral work by Robert Schumann

- by Robert Schumann
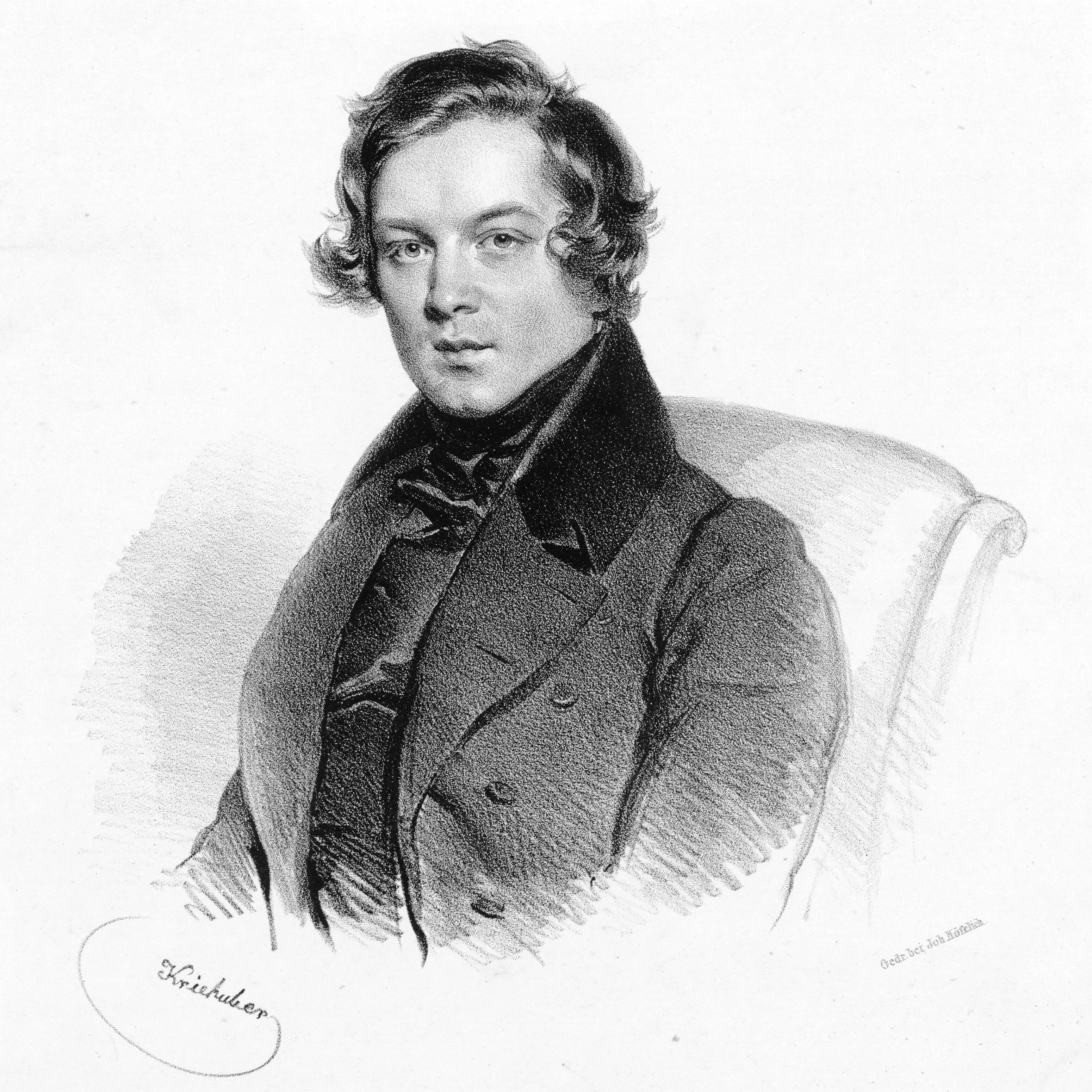
- Portrait of Robert Schumann, c. 1839
- Native name: Ouvertüre, Scherzo und Finale
- Key: E major
- Opus: 52
- Composed: 1841, revised 1845
- Dedication: Johannes Verhulst
- Published: 1846
- Duration: c. 17 minutes
- Movements: 3
- Scoring: Orchestra

The Overture, Scherzo and Finale in E major (German: Ouvertüre, Scherzo und Finale), Op. 52, is a work for symphony orchestra by Robert Schumann, written in 1841. Schumann originally considered it his second symphony. The Overture, Scherzo and Finale was received tepidly by critics, was revised in 1845 and published the next year, with a dedication to Johannes Verhulst.

== Instrumentation ==
The piece is scored for two flutes, two oboes, two clarinets, two bassoons, two horns, two trumpets, three trombones, timpani, and strings.

== Structure ==
The work is in three movements:

1. Overture. (Andante con moto in E minor – Allegro in E major and time) (sketched and completed in April 1841)
2. Scherzo. Vivo, in 6/8 time and in C♯ minor, whose theme is based on that of the overture. It has a trio section in D♭ major, in contrasting 2/4 time whose material reappears as the coda of the movement.
3. Finale. Allegro molto vivace (orchestrated around May 1841)

== Recordings ==
Year	Conductor	Orchestra	Label
1953	Lawrance Collingwood	London Symphony Orchestra	Parlophone
1954	Carl Schuricht	Orchestre de la Société des Concerts du Conservatoire	Decca
1956	Paul Kletzki	Israel Philharmonic Orchestra	Warner Classics
1962	Franz Konwitschny	Gewandhausorchester Leipzig	Eterna
1968	Sir Georg Solti	Wiener Philharmoniker	Decca
1973	Wolfgang Sawallisch	Staatskapelle Dresden	Warner Classics
1988	Neeme Järvi	London Symphony Orchestra	Chandos
1988	Peter Maag	Bern Symphony Orchestra	Helios (Hyperion)
1991	Herbert von Karajan	Berliner Philharmoniker	Deutsche Grammophon
1993	Johannes Wildner	Polish National Radio Symphony Orchestra	Naxos
1998	John Eliot Gardiner	Orchestre Révolutionnaire et Romantique	Deutsche Grammophon
1999	Christian Thielemann	Philharmonia Orchestra	Deutsche Grammophon
2007	Wolfgang Sawallisch	Philadelphia Orchestra	Philadelphia Orchestra
2012	Gerard Schwarz	Seattle Symphony	Naxos
2013	Heinz Holliger	WDR Symphony Orchestra Cologne	Audite
2013	Stewart Robertson	Atlantic Classical Orchestra	Artek
2015	Paavo Järvi	Deutsche Kammerphilharmonie Bremen	RCA Red Seal
2026	Jörg Widmann	Irish Chamber Orchestra	Pentatone
