= Johann Gottfried Kuntsch =

German organist and teacher (1775–1855)

Kuntsch c. 1830

Johann Gottfried Kuntsch or Kuntzsch (20 December 1775 – 12 March 1855) was a German organist and teacher, remembered as the teacher of Robert Schumann, who dedicated a set of pedal piano studies to him.

== Life and career ==
Kuntsch was born in Dresden on 20 December 1775. He became a teacher at the Zwickau Lyceum and organist of St Mary's Cathedral in that city. He is described in Grove's Dictionary of Music and Musicians as "one of those earnest, old-fashioned, somewhat pedantic, musicians, to whom Germany owes so much; who are born in the poorest ranks, raise themselves by unheard-of efforts and self-denial, and die without leaving any permanent mark except the pupils whom they help to form."

The most prominent of Kuntsch's pupils was Robert Schumann, who studied the piano with him and seemed destined for a career as a virtuoso pianist until he turned to composition. Schumann's studies for the pedal piano – six pieces in canon form (Op. 56), composed in 1845 and published in 1846 – are dedicated to his former teacher.

Kuntsch died in Zwickau on 12 March 1855, aged 79.

== Sources ==
- Daverio, John; Eric Sams (2000). "Schumann, Robert". In Stanley Sadie (ed.). The New Grove Dictionary of Music and Musicians. Vol. 22. London: Macmillan. ISBN 978-1-56159-239-5.
- Geck, Martin (2013) [2010]. Robert Schumann: The Life and Work of a Romantic Composer. Chicago: University of Chicago Press. ISBN 978-0-22-628469-9.
- Grove, George (1878). A Dictionary of Music and Musicians. Vol. 2. London: Macmillan. OCLC 460285210.
