= Arabeske (Schumann) =

1839 composition by Robert Schumann

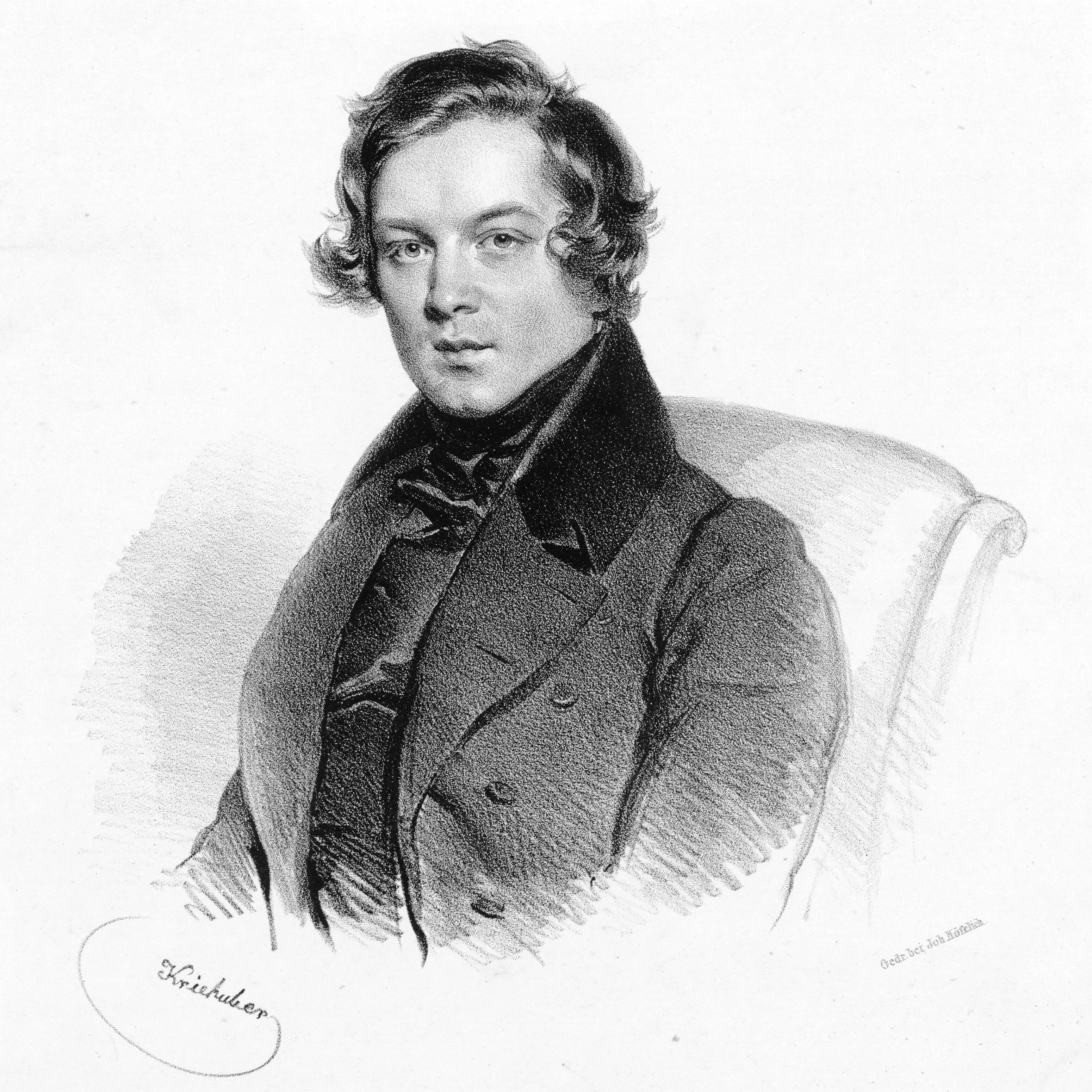
Robert Schumann in 1839

Arabeske in C major, Op. 18 is a composition by Robert Schumann, written in 1839 when he was 29 years old. He dedicated it to Frau Majorin Friederike Serre auf Maxen, to whom he also dedicated his Blumenstück, Op. 19. Schumann had left Leipzig for Vienna in the autumn of 1838. His relationship with Clara Wieck had reached a point of no return, as her father vehemently opposed anything that might interfere with his daughter's career as a pianist and strongly disapproved of Schumann as a possible son-in-law. Geographically yet not emotionally detached from Clara, he was able to communicate with her only through letters and in his own music. This has been proposed as an explanation for this work, which alternates passages of wistful longing with more robust, declamatory episodes.

== Background ==
In Vienna, Schumann found himself beset by depression and professional disappointment. Nevertheless, he managed to create a few compositions of remarkable grace and beguiling charm, writing (as he put it) in a "lighter more feminine style". In his letter of 15 August 1839 to Ernst Becker, Schumann characterized both the Arabeske and Blumenstück as "delicate -- for ladies". He was influenced by Christian Schuburt's book on musical aesthetics, in which C major, the key of the Arabeske, was identified with the childish and simple, relegating more intense emotions to the sharped keys. Schumann wrote in the year of the creation of the Arabeske, "Never refer me again as Jean Paul II or Beethoven II […] I am willing to be ten times less than these others, and only something to myself."

== Description ==
Arabeske (6:20)
Performance by Mario Andrea Valori in 2011

The term Arabeske is used here as a poetic metaphor, not only to describe florid decoration, but also, in Schlegel's terms, to suggest a fluid, organic system of fragments that transcends artificial Classical forms. Schumann employs modified rondo form to encompass a short ABACA rondo form, with the gently lyrical main section A, two more intense episodes B (Florestan) and C, and a beautifully pensive Epilog (Eusebius).

The piece moves lithely between contrasting moods, and seems to conclude with a gentle recapitulation of the opening material. The poignant postlude that follows comes as an exquisite surprise. Schumann's original metronome markings for this work appear to have been too fast. Clara Schumann later revised them as Light and delicate [Leicht und zart] (crotchet =126), Minor #1 [Minore I] (crotchet =112), and Minor #2 [Minore II] (crotchet =120).
