= Joan Chissell =

English writer and music lecturer (1919 - 2007)

Joan Olive Chissell (22 May 1919 – 31 January 2007) was an English writer and lecturer on music, and music reviewer for The Times 1948–79. She made a special study of the life and works of Robert Schumann.

== Career ==
Joan Chissell was born in Cromer, and was educated at the Manor School in Sheringham. She gained a scholarship at Royal College of Music (RCM) in 1937, where she studied piano and composition with Kendall Taylor, theory under Herbert Howells and history and criticism under Frank Howes. Her pianistic career was cut short by an injury. Despite this, while at the RCM she gave the first UK performance of Maurice Ravel's Piano Concerto for the Left Hand.

She taught at the RCM from 1943 to 1953, and at the University of Oxford and University of London in the 1940s. She joined The Times as its first female music critic in 1948, remaining in that post until she retired in 1979. Initially she was assistant to Frank Howes, who had succeeded H. C. Colles as chief music critic. From 1960 she worked under William Mann. She also wrote reviews for Gramophone and broadcast for the BBC.

She was devoted to the music of Robert Schumann (also an aspiring pianist whose career was curtailed by injury), and wrote two books about him (1948, "Master Musicians" series; 1972). For her contribution to Schumanniana, she won the Robert Schumann Prize awarded by his birthplace, the city of Zwickau, in 1991.

Her other writings concern Schumann's wife Clara Schumann (Clara Schumann, a dedicated spirit: a study of her life and work, 1983), their friend Johannes Brahms (1977), and Frédéric Chopin (1965).

She was a juror at the Sydney International Piano Competition in 1988 and 1992, and at other international music competitions.

Joan Chissell died in 2007, aged 87. She never married.

== Legacy ==
After her death her executors instituted the Joan Chissell Robert Schumann Prize for Pianists at the RCM.

There is also the Joan Chissell Schumann Competition for Singers, considered one of the most significant competitions at any UK conservatoire.
