= Linda Correll Roesner =

American musicologist from New York (born 1940)

Linda Correll Roesner (born in 1940) is an American musicologist from New York. Roesner has distinguished herself with the publication of critical scores of Schumann and Brahms works. In 1998, Roesner received the Robert Schumann Prize of the City of Zwickau.
