= Blumenstück (Schumann) =

1839 piano composition by Robert Schumann

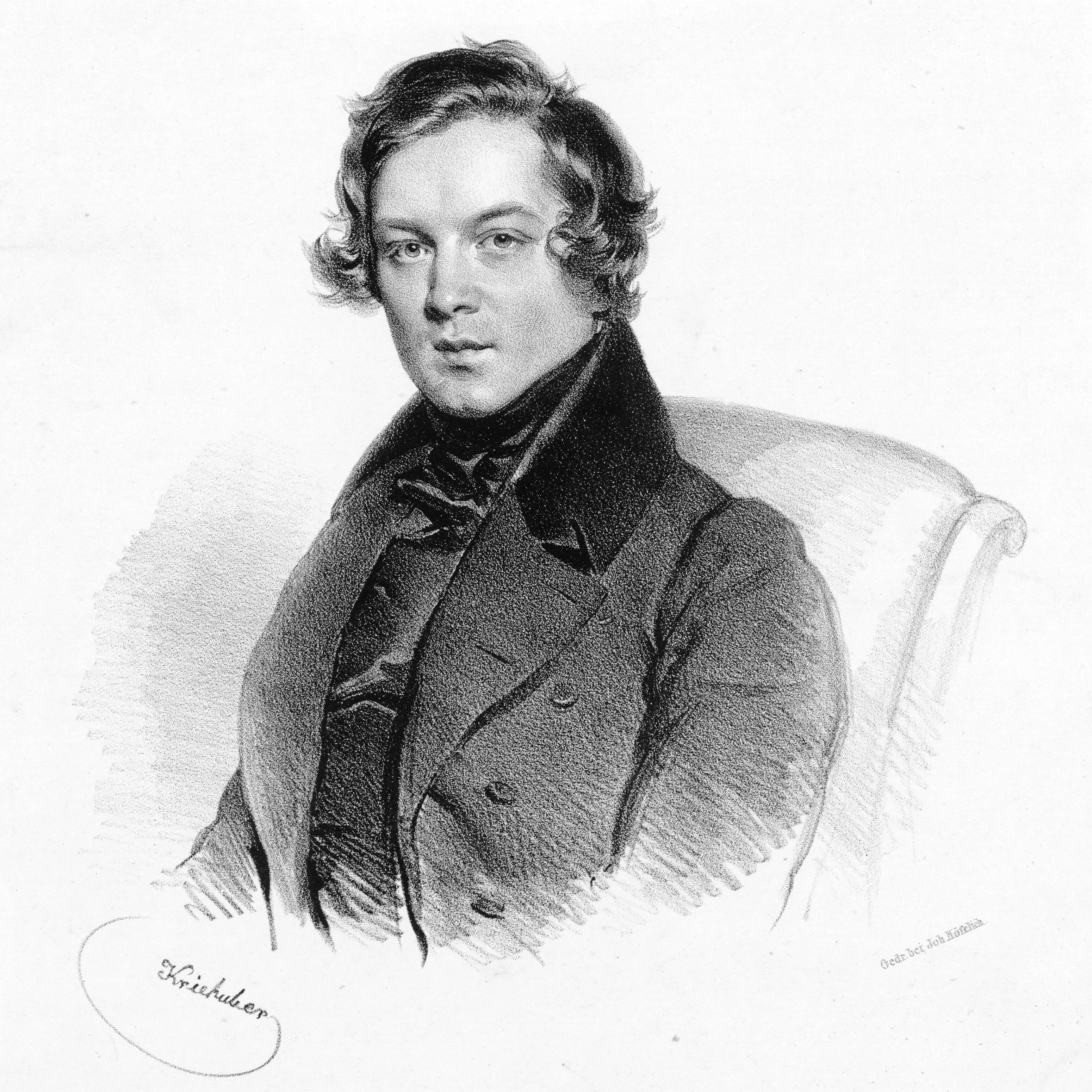
Robert Schumann in 1839

Blumenstück (Flower Piece) in D♭, Op. 19, is a piano work by Robert Schumann, written in 1839. Blumenstück is a series of short, connected and thematically related episodes, of which the second forms a recurring refrain while undergoing changes in both key and mood. It is considered to reflect the amorous human activities with which flowers are associated, rather than as depictions of flowers themselves. The piece takes between six and seven minutes to play.

== Background ==
Blumenstück was written in Vienna in January 1839; its companion piece, the Arabeske in C, Op. 18, was written in December 1838. Other works written around this time were the Humoreske, Op. 20, and the final movement of the Sonata No. 2 in G minor, Op. 22. Schumann wrote that he composed the Arabeske and Blumenstück "hoping to elevate myself to the front rank of favourite composers of the women of Vienna." In his letter of 15 August 1839 to Ernst Becker, Schumann dismissed both works as simply delicate salon pieces fit only for ladies to play; however, they both contain great beauty and are full of intimate charm. His intended fiancee Clara Wieck was in Paris, but Schumann stayed in Vienna to compose and write for the Neue Zeitschrift für Musik, for which he had moved to Vienna from Leipzig.

The two pieces were published simultaneously in August 1839, although not as a set. However, in a letter of 11 August 1839 to Henriette Voigt, Schumann seems to regard them as a pair of works, as he described them together as "less important than the Humoreske". Both works are dedicated to Majorin Friederike Serre auf Maxen, the wife of Major Anton Serre, who together lent Schumann great encouragement in his romance with Clara Wieck, despite being close friends of her father Friedrich Wieck, who was implacably opposed to the marriage.

Blumenstück features a falling four-note motif that Schumann had previously used to refer to Clara Wieck in Carnaval, Op. 9. Rather than in his manuscript book, Schumann sketched Blumenstück in his Brautbuch; it was offered, along with the song cycle Myrthen, Op. 25, of 1840, as a bridal gift.

In a letter to Clara on 24 January 1839, Schumann wrote that he had recently completed a number of small piano pieces, with the titles:

- Guirlande ("variations, but not on a theme"; this could be a mistranslation of "but not on one theme", meaning "but not on a single theme")
- Rondolette, and
- "other small things, of which I have so many, and which I shall chain together prettily under the title Kleine Blumenstücke, much like one might name a series of pictures".

The Blumenstück is in the form of a double theme and variations, and the Arabeske is in rondo form. It is unclear whether the first two titles refer to works that are now lost or whether they are the original titles of Blumenstück and the Arabeske respectively. It has also been suggested that both these works were originally meant to be included in the otherwise unidentified Kleine Blumenstücke.
