= August Schumann =

18th- and 19th-century German bookseller and publisher

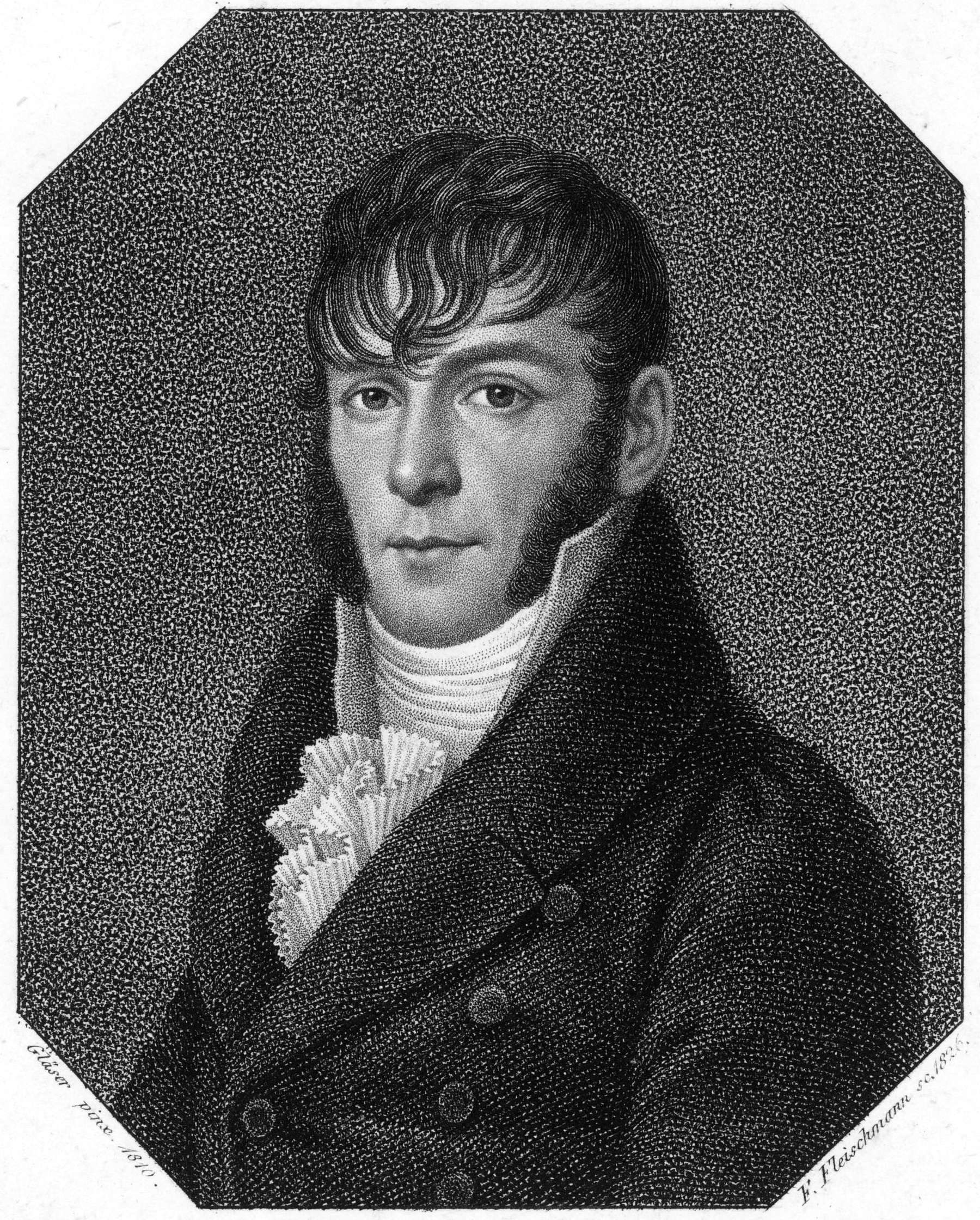
August Schumann.

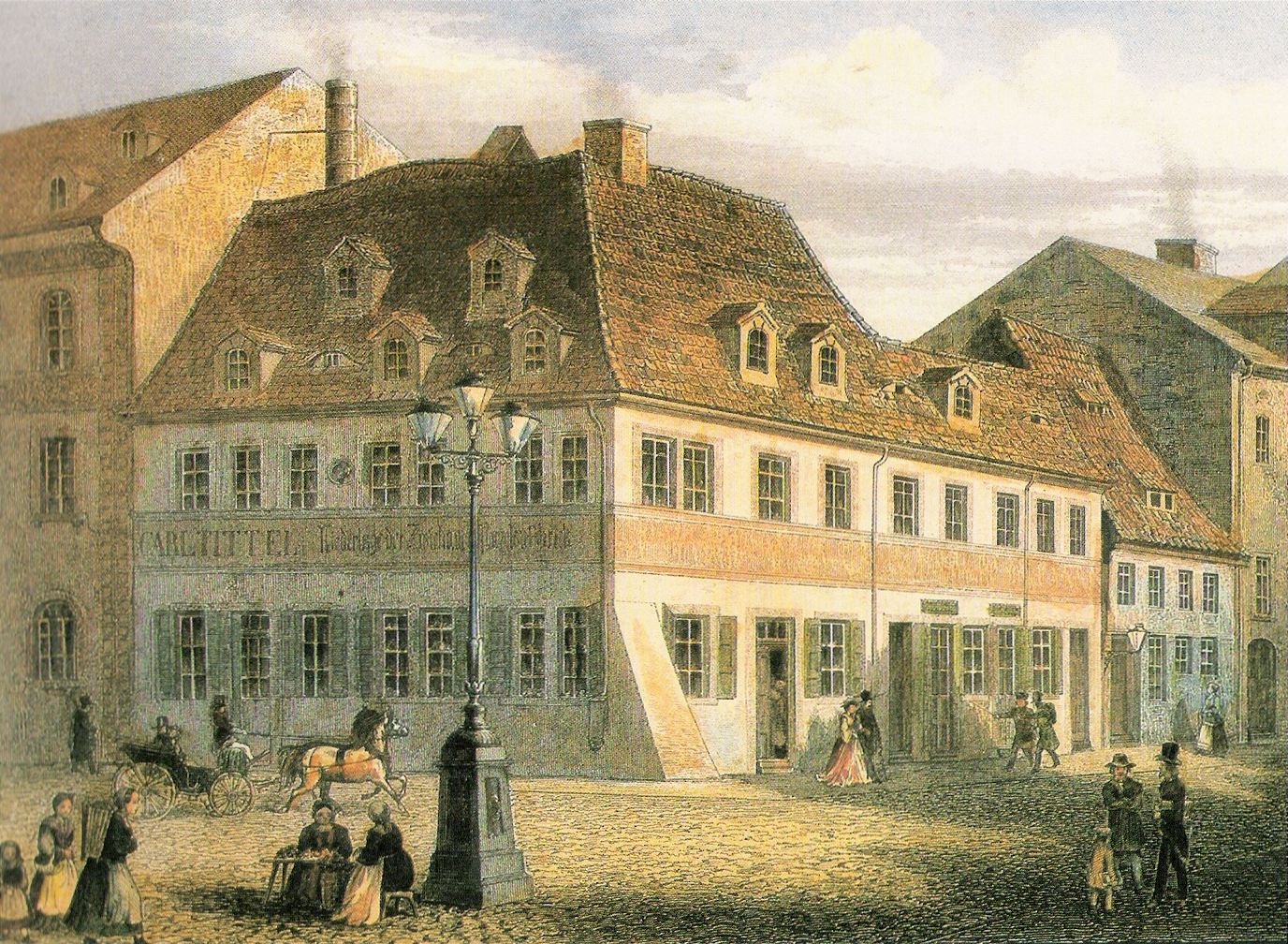
House of Schumann in Zwickau

Friedrich August Gottlob Schumann (March 2, 1773 – August 10, 1826) was a German bookseller and publisher. His best-known work is the 18-volume Lexicon of Saxony, which was completed after his death by Albert Schiffner. He wrote Junker Kurt von Krötenstein's verliebte Heldenfahrt (Lord Kurt von Krötenstein's Hero's Journey of Love) under the pen name of Legaillard.

== Childhood ==
Schumann was born on 2 March 1773, as the oldest of 6 siblings, to the couple Johann Friedrich Schumann and Christiane Magdalena Bohme. The father worked as a pastor in Endschutz, and had little money around; due to this August Schumann was unable to achieve higher education.

== Marriage and family ==
August married Johanna Christiana Schnabel (1767–1836) and was the father of five children: Emilie (born in 1796, who committed suicide in 1826), Eduard (1799–1839), Carl (1801–1849), Julius (1804–1833) and the composer Robert Schumann (1810–1856).
