= Diligentia =

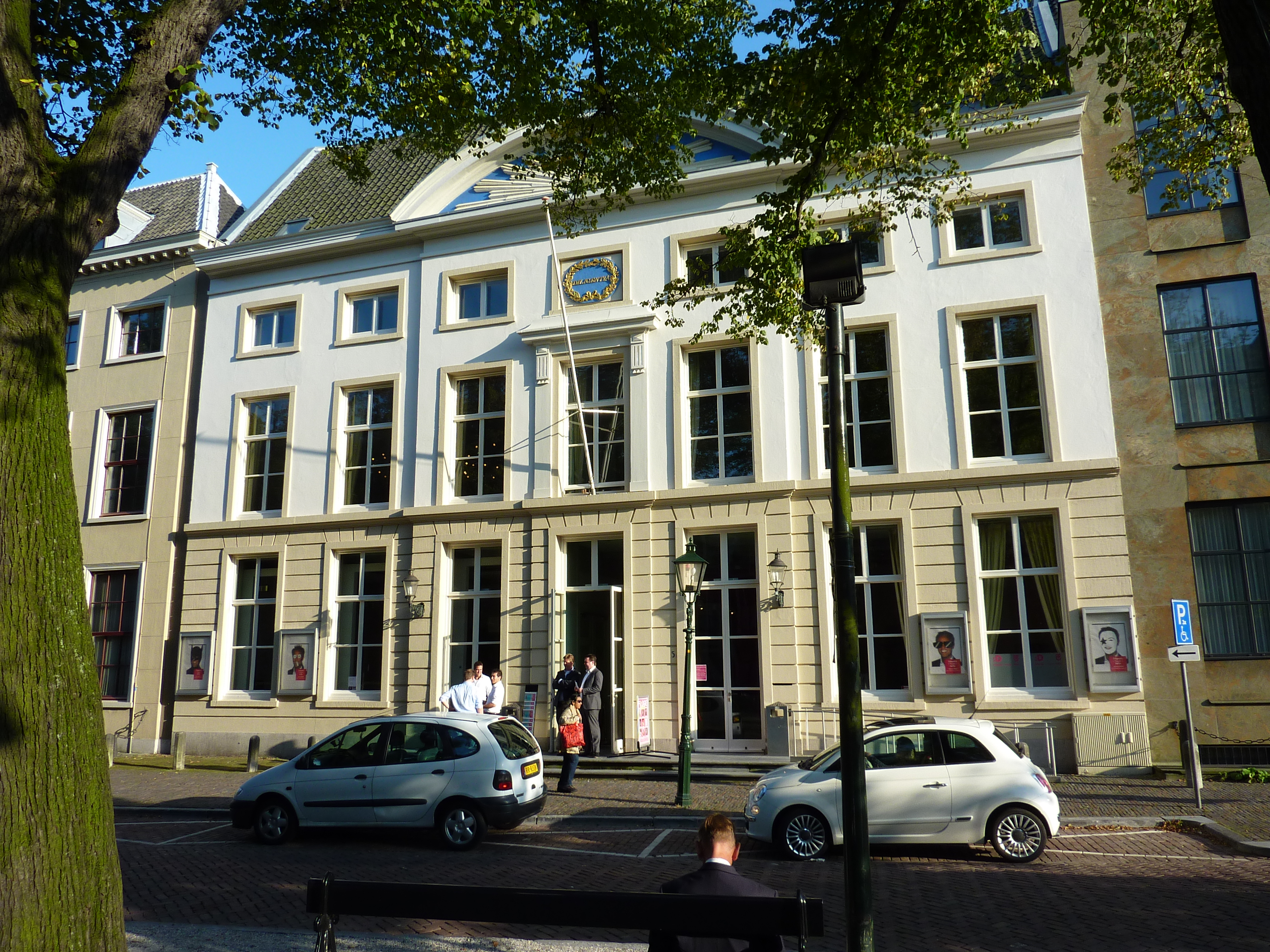
An image of Diligentia

Diligentia is a learned society founded in The Hague in 1793. All reigning monarchs of the Netherlands since King William I have been patrons of Diligentia, and many members of the royal family have been honorary members.
