= Paradise and the Peri =

Oratorio by Robert Schumann

Das Paradies und die Peri
- Oratorio by Robert Schumann
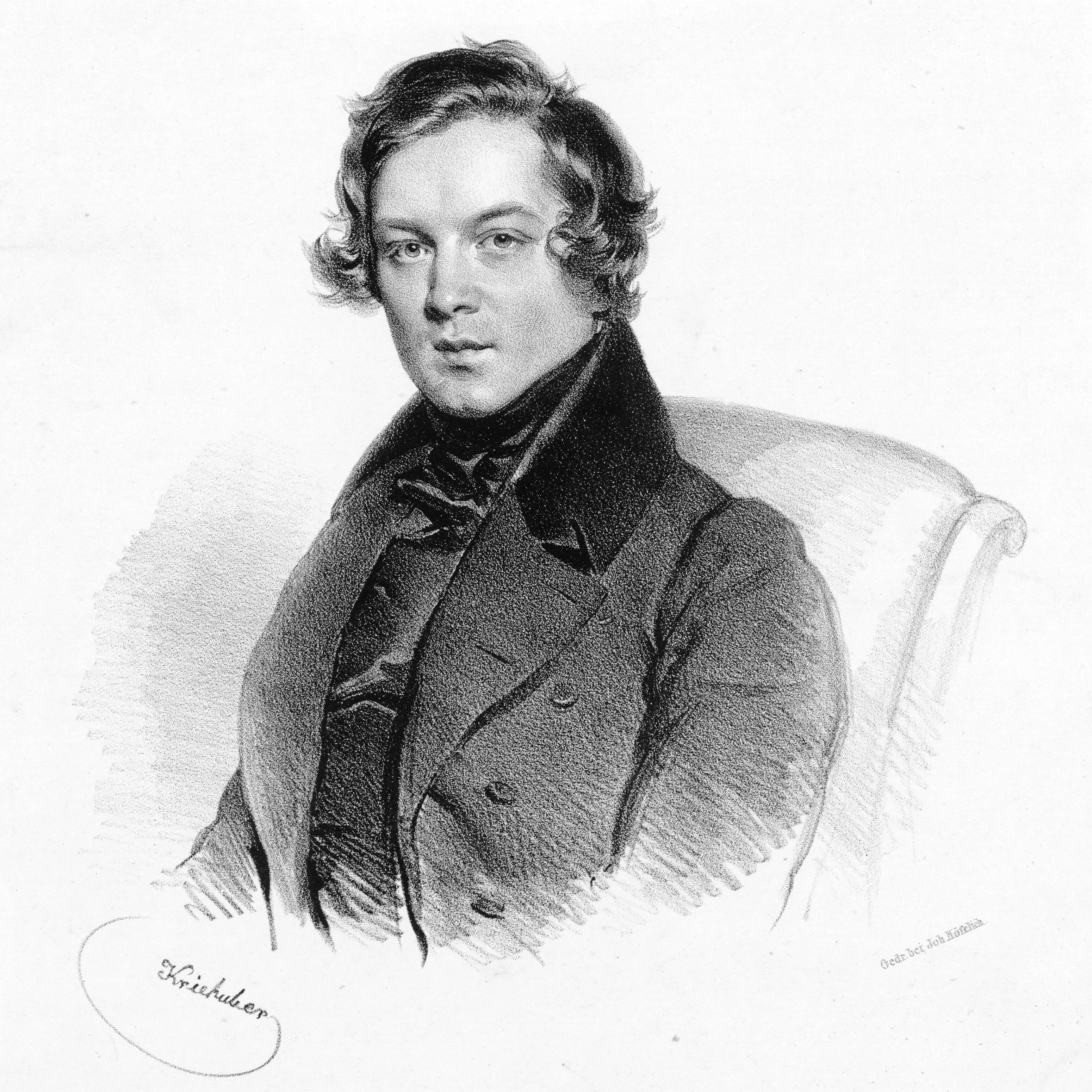
- The composer in 1839
- English: Paradise and the Peri
- Opus: 50
- Text: translation by Schumann and Emil Flechsig
- Language: German
- Based on: Lalla-Rookh by Thomas Moore
- Composed: 1843
- Movements: 23 in three parts
- Scoring: soloists; choir; orchestra

Paradise and the Peri, in German Das Paradies und die Peri, is a secular oratorio for soloists, choir, and orchestra by Robert Schumann. Completed in 1843, the work was published as Schumann's Op. 50.

The work is based on a German translation (by Schumann and his friend Emil Flechsig) of a tale from Lalla-Rookh by Irish poet and lyricist Thomas Moore. The peri, a creature from Persian mythology, is the focus of the story, having been expelled from Paradise and trying to regain entrance by giving the gift that is most dear to heaven. Eventually the peri is admitted after bringing a tear from the cheek of a repentant old sinner who has seen a child praying.

The work is scored for piccolo, 2 flutes, 2 oboes, 2 clarinets, 2 bassoons, 4 horns, 2 trumpets, 3 trombones, ophicleide (sometimes replaced by a tuba), timpani, cymbals, bass drum, triangle, harp, and strings.

Peter Ostwald in his biography Schumann: The Inner Voices of a Musical Genius records that Schumann "confided to a friend that 'while writing Paradise and the Peri a voice occasionally whispered to me "what you are doing is not done completely in vain,"'" and that even Richard Wagner praised this work. The cantata is generally held to be a significant achievement by Schumann, and it perhaps appeals less than it might otherwise to modern audiences due to the flowery, Eastern-inspired verbiage of the libretto, which represents a vogue for orientalism that was in full swing in the 19th century but has receded considerably today. This oratorio premiered under the composer's baton on 4 December 1843 in Leipzig. It was well received, and performances in Dresden and Berlin followed.

The first English performance took place under difficult conditions at the Hanover Square Rooms in London at the invitation of the Philharmonic Society conducted by William Sterndale Bennett with Jenny Lind taking the leading soprano part.

Paradise and the Peri was the vehicle for Gabrielle Krauss's first important appearance, in Vienna in 1858, when she was not yet 16 years old.

== Sources ==
- Robert Schumann’s Das Paradies und die Peri and its early Performances Thomas Moore in Europe, 31 May 2017
- Das Paradies und die Peri, Op. 50 (Part One, Part Two), Robert Schumann Los Angeles Philharmonic
- Das Paradies und die Peri, Op.50: Scores at the International Music Score Library Project
- Peter Ostwald, Schumann: The Inner Voices of a Musical Genius (Boston: Northeast University Press, 1985). ISBN 1-55553-014-1. pp. 182–3.
- John Daverio, "Expressing The Highest Through Chorus and Orchestra"—Liner notes to the recording Das Paradies und die Peri as performed by the Monteverdi Choir and Orchestre Revolutionnaire et Romantiques under the direction of John Eliot Gardiner (Archiv Production 289 457 660-2, released in 1999).
