= Martin Geck =

German musicologist (1936–2019)

Martin Geck (19 March 1936 – 22 November 2019) was a German musicologist. He taught at the Technical University of Dortmund. His publications concerned a number of major composers. Among the composers in whom he specialised was Johann Sebastian Bach.

== Publications ==
- Ludwig van Beethoven. Rowohlt Verlag, Reinbek bei Hamburg 1996, ISBN 3-499-50570-3.
- ABC-Tierlieder zum Mitmachen. (with Gabriele Kulick and Irmgard Merkt), CD and Cassette, Cornelsen, Berlin 1997, ISBN 3-464-67708-7.
- Musiktherapie als Problem der Gesellschaft. Klett-Cotta, Stuttgart 1998, ISBN 3-129-22840-3.
- „Denn alles findet bei Bach statt“. Erforschtes und Erfahrenes. Metzler, Stuttgart/Weimar 2000, ISBN 3-476-01740-0.
- Von Beethoven bis Mahler. Leben und Werk der großen Komponisten des 19. Jahrhunderts. Rowohlt, Reinbek bei Hamburg 2000, ISBN 3-499-60891-X.
- Johann Sebastian Bach. Rowohlt, Reinbek bei Hamburg 2002, ISBN 3-499-50637-8; English translation 2006.
- Richard Wagner. Rowohlt, Reinbek bei Hamburg 2004, ISBN 3-499-50661-0. Recension
- Mozart. Eine Biographie. Rowohlt, Reinbek bei Hamburg 2005, ISBN 3-498-02492-2. Recension
- Wenn Papageno für Elise einen Feuervogel fängt. Kleine Geschichte der Musik. Rowohlt, Berlin 2006. Recension
- Wenn der Buckelwal in die Oper geht. 33 Variationen über die Wunder klassischer Musik. Siedler, Munich 2009. Recension
- Robert Schumann. Mensch und Musiker der Romantik. Siedler, Munich 2010, ISBN 978-3-88680-897-7. Recension
- Richard Wagner. Biography. Siedler, Munich 2012, ISBN 978-3-88680-927-1. Recension
- Johannes Brahms. Rowohlt, Reinbek bei Hamburg 2013, ISBN 978-3-499-50686-4.
- Matthias Claudius. Biographie eines Unzeitgemäßen. Siedler, Munich 2014, ISBN 978-3-88680-986-8. Recension
- Beethoven. Der Schöpfer und sein Universum. Siedler, Munich 2017, ISBN 382-7-5008-69.
