= Irmgard Merkt =

German music educator (born 1946)

Irmgard Merkt (born 7 April 1946) is a German music educator.

== Life ==
Born in Munich, Merkt first studied opera singing and later music for the teaching profession at grammar schools at the State University of Music and Performing Arts Munich. After several years of teaching at grammar schools in the Ruhr area, she became a research assistant to her future doctoral supervisor Werner Probst at the Pädagogische Hochschule Ruhr in 1978. In 1983, she obtained her doctorate with the dissertation Deutsch-türkischer Musikunterricht in der Bundesrepublik. Ein Situationsbericht. In the context of this work, she designed the so-called interface approach for intercultural music education, which Wolfgang Martin Stroh further developed into the Extended Interface Approach.

From 1979 to 1989, Merkt was an academic councillor at the University of Dortmund in the field of music education for disabled people. From 1989 to 1991, she was a professor in the subject of media education - with a focus on music in social education - at the Dortmund University of Applied Sciences and Arts, and from 1991 to 2014, she was a professor in music education and music therapy in education and rehabilitation with disabilities at the Technical University of Dortmund. In the years 2004 to 2007 and 2012 to 2014, she was dean of the Faculty of Rehabilitation Sciences.

Merkt is still working today (as of March 2021) in education and training in the areas of intercultural and inclusive music education and adult music education for people with disabilities.

== Project Musik und Inklusion ==
=== InTakt, Europa InTakt und Förderpreis InTakt ===
From 1998, Merkt initiates the InTakt continuing education programme at TU Dortmund University as well as the in-service training programme Zertifikat InTakt. 2003 sees the start of the international series of events Europa InTakt, which reaches a climax with "Europs InTakt 2010" as part of the European Capital of Culture RUHR.2010. She is co-initiator and juror of the InTakt promotional prize of the miriam foundation in Dortmund. The prize was awarded annually to inclusive music projects from 2004 to 2019.

=== Dortmund Model: Musik (DOMO) ===
The project Dortmund Model: Music, funded by the Ministry of Labour, Health and Social Affairs of North Rhine-Westphalia, is developing new structures of musical education for adults with disabilities and for inclusive artistic ensembles between 2010 and 2013. Keywords are broad education, talent promotion and professionalisation.

=== Network Culture and Inclusion ===
Merkt has a leadership function in the "Network Culture and Inclusion", which as a dialogue and expert forum represents one of the measures mentioned in the Federal Government's Action Plan 2.0 for the implementation of the UN Disability Rights Convention Established in 2015 and funded by the Federal Government Commissioner for Culture and the Media (BKM), the network reflects on previous approaches to the participation of persons with disabilities in cultural life and makes recommendations for a diverse and actively shaping access of persons with impairments to the cultural landscape.

== Awards ==
- 2016 – Silberne Stimmgabel des Landesmusikrats Nordrhein-Westfalen.
- 2020 – Order of Merit of the Federal Republic of Germany.

== Publications and editorship (selection) ==
- Musik – Vielfalt – Integration – Inklusion. Musikdidaktik für die eine Schule. Regensburg: ConBrio. (2019) ISBN 978-3-940768-84-1
- Die Künste und die Kunst der Inklusion. In Gerland, Juliane (ed.) Kultur Inklusion Forschung. Weinheim, Basel: Beltz (2017) pp. 16–31 ISBN 978-3-7799-3688-6
- Schriftenreihe Netzwerk Kultur und Inklusion. Juliane Gerland, Susanne Keuchel, Irmgard Merkt (ed.) Regensburg: ConBrio Verlagsgesellschaft (2016–2019)
  - vol. 1 Kunst, Kultur und Inklusion. Teilhabe am künstlerischen Arbeitsmarkt ISBN 978-3-940768-63-6;
  - vol. 2 Kunst, Kultur und Inklusion. Ausbildung für künstlerische Tätigkeit von und mit Menschen mit Behinderung ISBN 978-3-940768-71-1;
  - vol. 3 Kunst, Kultur und Inklusion. Menschen mit Behinderung in Presse, Film und Fernsehen: Darstellung und Berichterstattung ISBN 978-3-940768-77-3;
  - vol. 4 Kultur oder Soziales? Kultur und Inklusion im Dilemma? ISBN 978-3-940768-85-8 Online-Veröffentlichung https://kultur-und-inklusion.net/ retrieved 13 March 2021
- Inklusion, kulturelle Teilhabe und Musik. In Bernatzky, Günther and Gunter Kreutz (ed.) Musik und Medizin. Chancen für Therapie, Prävention und Bildung. Vienna: Springer (2015) pp. 113–124 ISBN 978-3-7091-1599-2
- MUSIKKULTUR INKLUSIV. 10 Jahre Förderpreis InTakt der miriam-stiftung. Mit Beiträgen von Elisabeth Braun, Irmgard Merkt Anne-Kathrin Tietke, Robert Wagner, Birgit Jank. Dortmund: miriam-stiftung (2014). https://www.musik-inklusiv.de/f%C3%B6rderpreis-intakt retrieved 13 March 2021
- Authentizität und Adaption. Aspekte interkultureller Musikerziehung: Rückblick und Ausblick In Alge, Barbara and Oliver Krämer (ed.) Beyond Borders: Welt – Musik – Pädagogik. Musikpädagogik und Ethnomusikologie im Diskurs. Augsburg: Wißner (2013) pp. 115–130 ISBN 978-3-89639-884-0
- Deutsch-türkische Musikpädagogik in der Bundesrepublik. Ein Situationsbericht. Berlin: express edition (1983) ISBN 3-88548-086-7
- Banjo Liederbuch. Geck, Martin and Irmgard Merkt. With illustrations by F. W. Bernstein. Stuttgart: Klett (1982) ISBN 978-3-12-177500-2
