= Trio Fontenay =

Booklet cover for the Trio Fontenay's recording of the Beethoven piano trios (Teldec 9031-73281-2) which won the 1994 German Record Critics Award.

The Trio Fontenay was a German classical music piano trio which performed worldwide and recorded much of the significant piano trio repertoire between the years 1980 and 2006.

== Formation ==
The Trio Fontenay was formed in Hamburg in 1980. The original members of the trio were Wolf Harden, pianist; Michael Mücke, violinist; and Niklas Schmidt, cellist. The name "Fontenay" is old French for "source" and "fantasy", and is also the name of the street near the Hamburg Conservatory where the ensemble first met to practice. An important early influence on the group's interpretations came from classes they attended in Cologne which were taught by the Amadeus Quartet.

== Concert career ==
In the 1980s they quickly developed an active concert schedule, including regular appearances at major concert halls and festivals in Europe. In 1986 they made their American debut. Subsequently the group toured North and South America, Australia and the Far East. For a time the ensemble was named "trio in residence" at Théâtre du Châtelet and was based in Paris. In the 1995-1996 season they performed the complete Beethoven cycle at Paris’s Théâtre Chatelet, London’s Wigmore Hall, Berlin’s Schauspielhaus, Amsterdam’s Concertgebouw, and in Hamburg, Munich, and Cologne. Their recording of these works received the 1994 Preis der deutschen Schallplattenkritik [German Record Critics Award]. In 1998 the cellist Niklas Schmidt was replaced by Jens-Peter Maintz. The musicians decided to disband Trio Fontenay in February 2006.

== Audio recordings ==
The ensemble recorded music of Beethoven, Brahms, Debussy, Dvořák, Fauré, Haydn, Ives, Mendelssohn, Messiaen, Mozart, Rachmaninoff, Ravel, Roslavets, Schubert, Schumann, and Turina for Teldec, Denon, EMI, Philips, and K&K. The recordings listed here were made with Niklas Schmidt as the cellist, unless otherwise noted, and are listed in chronological order.

- Mendelssohn: Piano Trio No. 1 in D minor, Op. 49
- Rachmaninoff: Trio élégiaque No. 2 in D minor, Op. 9

Denon CO-1971 (1 CD, 73 min, DDD)
Reviewed by Christopher Headington in Gramophone, May 1988, p. 1616. Accessed 28 May 2009.

Prefers the Fontenay in both these works to the Borodin and the Beaux Arts Trios. Regarding the Rachmaninoff he says: "This performance...is deeply felt as well as skilful, and the recording in a Frankfurt church is a good one, even if the piano occasionally sounds a bit recessed. They are good also in the Mendelssohn Trio, a powerful work which can surprise those who know only the gentler side of this composer; I feel though, that some tempos are a little on the fast side."

- Brahms: Piano Trio No. 3 in C-minor, Op. 101
- Dvorak: Piano Trio No. 3 in F minor, B130

Teldec/ASV 8 43921 (1 CD, 63 min, DDD), released 8 March 1989.
Reviewed by Hilary Finch in Gramophone, September 1988, p. 434 Accessed 28 May 2009.

Likes the coupling, but prefers the Israel Piano Trio in the Brahms (9/86, CRD 3432), and the Borodin Trio in the Dvorak (2/85, CHAN8320). Finds the Fontenay Trio "too reticent" and the studio acoustic "too harsh."

Notes:

The Brahms trio was reissued as part of a complete set on Teldec 9031-76036-2.
The Dvorak trio was reissued as part of a complete set on Teldec 9031-76458-2.

- Schubert:

•Piano Trio No. 1 in B-flat major, D898
•Piano Trio No. 2 in E-flat major, D929
•Piano Trio in B-flat major (Sonata in one movement), D28
•Notturno in E-flat major, D897
Deutsche Harmonia Mundi/EMI CDS7 49041-8 (2 CDs, 99 min, DDD)
Reviewed in by Christopher Headington in Gramophone, January 1989, p. 1181. Accessed 28 May 2009.

"I like this issue for its affectionate and skilful playing and for its faithful recording" but "if you seek a more urgent view of this music the Beaux Arts Trio on Philips have more momentum and I have to say that they seem more successful in finding a Schubertian balance between unforced sunny simplicity on the one hand and tension or brooding on the other..."

Note: The Schubert trios were recorded again and released in 1996 on Teldec 4509-94558-2.

- Brahms: Piano Trio No. 2 in C major, Op. 87
- Dvorak: Piano Trio No. 1 in B-flat major, B51

Teldec/ASV 244 177-2 (1 CD, 64 min, DDD), released 28 April 1992.
Reviewed by Alan Sanders in Gramophone, February 1990, pp. 1479-80. Accessed 28 May 2009.

"The playing [in the Dvorak] is thoughtful but at the same time spontaneous in feeling, beautifully poised, and generously phrased. ... I can give the Fontenay no greater compliment than to say that their version [of the Brahms] is fully competitive [with Szeryng, Fournier, Rubinstein (4/88, RD86260)], and has its own high qualities of high musicianship, strength and style. Technically the quality of their playing is on a high level, and most importantly, they are able to preserve a feeling of spontaneity in front of the microphones."

Notes:

The Brahms trio was reissued as part of a complete set on Teldec 9031-76036-2.
The Dvorak trio was reissued as part of a complete set on Teldec 9031-76458-2.

- Mendelssohn:

•Piano Trio No. 1 in D minor, Op. 49
•Piano Trio No. 2 in C minor, Op. 66
Teldec 2292-44947-2 (1 CD, 58 min, DDD), released 28 April 1992.
Reviewed by John Warrack in Gramophone, September 1990, p. 558. Accessed 28 May 2009.

Slightly prefers the Guarneri and Fontenay to the Borodin Trio in these works: "Deciding between three such intelligent and well-planned performances is not simple, nor even wholly realistic. For all my admiration of the Borodin, I think there is an ease and elegance in the performance by the Guarneri that is closer to Mendelssohn. The Fontenay are very similar in spirit to the Guarneri, with whom choice can safely rest, if choice there must be."

- Mozart:

•Piano Trio in G major, K. 496
•Piano Trio in B-flat major, K. 502
•Piano Trio in C major, K. 548
•Piano Trio in G major, K. 564
•Divertimento in B-flat major, K. 254
Teldec/Warner Classics 2292-46439-2 (2 CDs, 129 min, DDD), released 1 November 1991.
Reviewed by Christopher Headington in Gramophone, November 1991, pp. 121-122.

"I like the Fontenay's approach, finding ample energy in outer movements and a good give-and-take between the three players. Sometimes one may feel that all is a bit too bright and breezy" but "their youthful freshness has its own charm.... In sum, I like the Beaux Arts best of all in this repertory..."

- Brahms: Piano Trio No. 1 in B, Op. 8
- Ives: Piano Trio

Teldec 2292-44924-2 (1 CD, DDD), released 28 April 1992.
Notes: The Brahms trio was reissued as part of a complete set on Teldec 9031-76036-2.

- Brahms: Piano Trio in A major, Op. posth.
- Schumann: Piano Trio No. 1 in D minor, Op. 63

Teldec 2292-44927-2 (1 CD, 65 min, DDD), released 1 May 1992.
Reviewed by Joan Chissell in Gramophone, March 1992, p. 66. Accessed 28 May 2009.
Notes: The Brahms trio was reissued as part of a complete set on Teldec 9031-76036-2.

- Brahms: Piano Trio No. 1 in B, Op. 8
- Brahms: Piano Trio No. 2 in C major, Op. 87
- Brahms: Piano Trio No. 3 in C-minor, Op. 101
- Brahms: Piano Trio in A major, Op. posth.

Teldec 9031-76036-2 (2 CDs, 123 min, DDD), released 4 August 1992.
No. 1 from Teldec 2292-44924-2; No. 2 from Teldec/ASV 244 177-2; No. 3 from Teldec/ASV 8 43921; Op. posth. from Teldec 2292-44927-2.
Reviewed by Joan Chissell in Gramophone, November 1992, p. 120. Accessed 24 August 2009.

- Ravel: Piano Trio
- Debussy: Premier trio in G
- Fauré: Piano Trio in D minor, Op. 120

Teldec 2292-44937-2 (1 CD, 74 min, DDD), released 7 July 1992.
Reviewed by Christopher Headington in Gramophone, July 1992, p. 69. Accessed 28 May 2009.

Prefers the Solomon Trio in this music (Pickwick IMP Masters MCD41).

- Messiaen: Quatuor pour la fin du temps

Teldec 9031-73239-2 (1 CD, 44 min, DDD); Elektra / Wea: released 12 January 1993
Performed with Eduard Brunner, clarinet.
Reviewed in Gramophone, December, 1992, p. 97. Accessed 28 May 2009.
Reissued as Teldec 0927-48749-2, 9 January 2002; Apex: 25 May 2006.
Reissue reviewed by Roger Nichols in Gramophone, February 2003, pp. 59, 61. Accessed 28 May 2009.

Notes several errors of execution, in particular an F-sharp instead of F-natural in the piano part of the fifth movement, repeated nine times. Prefers the recording with Yvonne Loriod, the composers wife, on piano, as more authentic (EMI Encore 575629-2).

- Dvorak:

Piano Trio No. 1 in B-flat major, Op. 21, B51
Piano Trio No. 3 in F minor, Op. 65, B130
Piano Trio No. 4 in E minor, Op. 90, B166
Piano Trio No. 2 in G minor, Op. 26, B56
Teldec 9031-76458-2 (2 CDs, 132 min, DDD), released 9 February 1993.
No.1 from Teldec/ASV 244 177-2; No.3 from Teldec/ASV 8 43921.

- Beethoven:

•Piano Trio No. 1, Op. 1 no. 1 in E-flat major
•Piano Trio No. 2, Op. 1 no. 2 in G major
•Piano Trio No. 3, Op. 1 no. 3 in Cminor
•Piano Trio No. 4, Op. 11 in B-flat major
•Piano Trio No. 5, Op. 70 no. 1 in D major, "Ghost"
•Piano Trio No. 6, Op. 70 no. 2 in E-flat major
•Piano Trio No. 7, Op. 97 in B-flat major, "Archduke"
•Piano Trio No. 10, Op. 44 in E-flat major (Theme and 14 variations)
•Piano Trio No. 11, Op. 121 (Variations on "Ich bin der Schneider Kakadu")
Teldec 9031-73281-2 (3 CDs, 226 min, DDD), [Elektra / WEA: 11 January 1994]
Reviewed by Joan Chissell in Gramophone, March 1994, p. 69 Accessed 14 March 2015.

"Indeed their quick-witted teamwork, no less than their often breathtaking individual brilliance, is never in doubt throughout all three discs. Nevertheless, for riper insights into Beethoven's music for piano trio I would strongly advise readers to stick to 'older-world' artists, not forgetting the Beaux Arts and Borodin Trios, the mid-price Zukerman/Du Pré/Barenboim and Stern/Rose/Istomin—or last but not least Perlman/Harrell/Ashkenazy who remain my own favourites. And I say this with regret, as I've so wholeheartedly admired what I've heard from the Fontenay before."

- Beethoven:

•Triple Concerto in C major, Op. 56
•Piano Trio No. 5, Op. 70 no. 1 in D major, "Ghost"
Teldec 4509-97447-2 (1 CD, 59 min, DDD), released 7 February 1995.
The Beethoven Triple Concerto is with the Philharmonia Orchestra conducted by Eliahu Inbal.
Recorded Blackheath Concert Hall, May, 1990.
The "Ghost" Trio recording is the same as that on Teldec 9031-73281-2

- Schumann:

•Piano Trio No. 2 in F major, Op. 80
•Piano Trio No. 3 in G minor, Op. 110
Teldec 4509-90864-2 (1 CD, 54 min, DDD), released 7 November 1995.
Reviewed by Joan Chissell in Gramophone, December 1995, p. 110. Accessed 28 May 2009.

"...taken on its own merits, this new Fontenay coupling of the Second and Third Trios has plenty to commend it in youthful verve and vividness of characterization...."

- Schubert:

•Piano Trio No. 1 in B-flat major, D898
•Piano Trio in B-flat major (Sonata in one movement), D28
•Piano Trio No. 2 in E-flat major, D929
•Notturno in E-flat major, D897
Teldec 4509-94558-2 (2 CDs, 106 min, DDD), released 2 July 1996.
Recorded at TELDEC-Studio, Berlin; June 1994 (D28 & D898); November 1994 - January 1995 (D929 & D897).
Reviewed favorably by Joan Chissell in Gramophone, February 1997, p. 74. Accessed 24 August 2009.
Note: The Schubert trios were also recorded earlier and released in 1988 on Deutsche Harmonia Mundi/EMI CDS7 49041-8.

- Beethoven:

•Scottish Songs, Op. 108

No. 2: "Sunset"
No. 3: "Oh! sweet were the hours"
No. 5: "The sweetest lad was Jamie"
No. 13: "Come fill, fill, my good fellow"
No. 20: "Faithfu' Johnie"
No. 24: "Again, my lyre"

•Irish Songs, WoO 152

No. 1: "The Return to Ulster"
No. 5: "The Massacre of Glencoe"
No. 10: "The Deserter"
No. 21: "Morning a cruel turmoiler is."

•Irish Songs, WoO 153

No. 9: "The kiss, dear maid, thy lip has left"
No. 11: "When far from the home"

•Irish Songs, WoO 154

No. 1: "The Elfin Fairies"
No. 4 "The Pulse of an Irishman"
No. 5: "Oh! who, my dear Dermot"

•Welsh Songs, WoO 155

No. 12: "Waken lords and ladies gay"
No. 15: "When mortals all to rest retire"
No. 21: "Cupid's Kindness"
No. 25: "The Parting Kiss"
No. 26: "Good Night"

Philips 442 784-2PH (1 CD, 61 min, DDD), released 13 January 1998.
Recorded with Wolfgang Holzmair, baritone.
Reviewed favorably by John B. Steane in Gramophone, April 1998, p. 85. Accessed 28 May 2009.

- Haydn:

•Keyboard Trio No. 18 (No. 32) in A major, Hob. XV:18
•Keyboard Trio No. 21 (No. 35) in C major, Hob. XV:21
•Keyboard Trio No. 25 (No. 39) in G major, "Gipsy Trio," Hob. XV:25
•Keyboard Trio No. 30 (No. 42) in E-flat major, Hob. XV:30
(see List of piano trios by Joseph Haydn for the new numbering indicated in parentheses)
Teldec 0630-15857-2 (1 CD, 65 min, DDD)
Reviewed by Richard Wigmore in Gramophone, February 1999, p. 67. Accessed 28 May 2009.

"A well-contrasted programme of late Haydn piano trios in sympathetic performances makes for a tempting proposition. I particularly enjoyed the Fontenay in the expansive opening movements of Nos. 18 and 30, generously and flexibly paced and imaginatively phrased, with the players finding fresh colours and nuances for the exposition repeats.... But if the Fontenay seem more attuned to Haydn's inwardness and lyricism than to his animal spirits, there's much to savour in these affectionate, thoughtfully characterized readings, truthfully captured by Teldec's engineers."

- Roslavets:

•Piano Trio No. 2 (1920)
•Piano Trio No. 3 (1921)
•Piano Trio No. 3 (1921)
Warner Apex 2564 69324-4 (1 CD, 72 min, DDD), released 23 November 2008.
Recorded: Teldec Studio, Berlin, January/August 2000
Jens-Peter Maintz was the cellist on this recording.

- Turina: Piano Trio No. 1, Op. 35
- Beethoven: Piano Trio No. 6, Op. 70 No. 2 in E-flat major

K&K Verlagsanstalt KuK 84 (1 CD, 60 min, DDD), released 9 September 2003.
Concert recording from Maulbronn Abbey, Germany, during June, 2002.
Jens-Peter Maintz was the cellist on this recording.

== Video recording ==
- Mozart: Piano Trio in B-flat major, K. 502
- Henze: Kammersonate (1948; revised 1963)
- Brahms: Piano Trio No. 2 in C major, Op. 87

Live recording from Bad Kissingen, [1988] Summer Concert at the Weißen Saal.
Pioneer Classics PC-11546D (1 DVD, NTSC, 4:3, 68 min), released 30 October 2001.

== Notes ==
- Note: Release dates are dependent on geographic market. The United States (usually from amazon.com) date has been used unless otherwise noted.
