= Franz Vorraber =

Austrian and German pianist (born 1962)

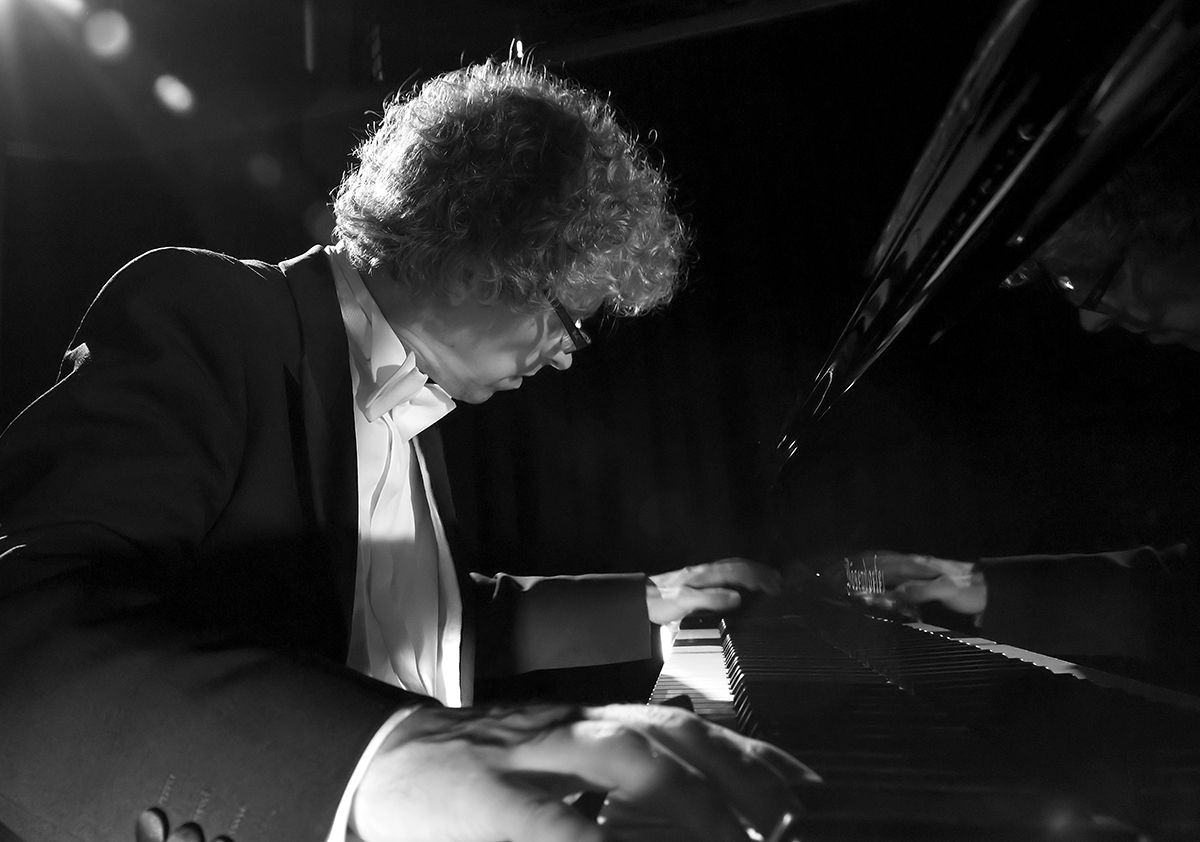
- Born: 24 August 1962; Graz, Austria
- Occupations: Pianist; organist; composer
- Website: www.vorraber.com

Franz Vorraber (born 24 August 1962) is an Austrian and German pianist and composer.

== Studies ==
Born in Graz the son of an organist, Vorraber started practicing the piano at the age of five, followed by first studies on the church organ at the age of seven. He began professional studies in 1972 at the age of ten with the admission to the piano class for exceptional students at the University of Music and Performing Arts, with the violin as a second instrument. Later he continued his studies at the Frankfurt University of Music and Performing Arts as a student of Joachim Volkmann. Both institutions graduated him with honours and highest degrees.

== Debut ==
Vorraber performed his debut recital in Tokyo, at the age of 19. Since then he has given recitals in Europe, Japan, and the United States and concerts with orchestras such as the Gewandhauskammerorchester Leipzig, the Leipziger Kammerorchester, the Orchestre Philharmonique du Luxembourg, the Westdeutsche Sinfonia, the Staatsphilharmonie Rheinland Pfalz, and the Robert Schumann Philharmonie with conductors such as Dennis Russell Davies, Alun Francis, Dirk Joeres, Daniel Klajner, Hilary Griffiths, Marcus Bosch, Vladislav Czarnecki, Reinhard Seifried, Marcello Bufalini, and Jonathan Seers.

== Projects ==
Vorraber recorded a cycle of Robert Schumann's complete piano works during twelve sessions in different cities in Europe and Japan. The recordings are released on a series of thirteen CDs for which he was awarded the Austrian Broadcasting's Pasticcio prize in 2006.

During his career Vorraber has received many prizes, for example from the Ministry of Education, from the piano manufacturer Bösendorfer in Vienna and from the city of Graz. He also won the "Joachim Erhard Prize" and received the Best Disk Award in Japan 2001 for the DVD AUDIO "Wiener Abend".

== Composition ==
In addition to his activities as a musician, Vorraber also devotes himself to composition. Several solo compositions are already published on CD. His first piano concerto was premiered with great success at the monastery festival in Maulbronn, Germany. His wind quintet was premiered by the "Wind Quintet of Staatskapelle Berlin", a seven-piece trio at the Mendelssohnfest, the Nonet in Gewandhaus Leipzig, and his sextet at the Stelzenfestival. A great success was also the project "Sätze von Liebe" (Sentences of Love) with poems and self-compositions together with the writer Peter Härtling.

== Lecturer ==
Since 1991 Vorraber has been working as a lecturer for piano at the Academy of Music in Wiesbaden, Germany. He currently lives in Zellingen, Bavaria.

== Discography ==
- 2002-2004: Robert Schumann: The Complete Piano Works, Vol. 1-13 - Label: Thorofon
- 2003: Camille Saint-Saëns, piano concerto n°2, Franz Vorraber, Anhaltische Philarmonie Dessau, dir.Golo Berg. CD Thoroffon (Bella Musica)
- 2003-2007: Intime Träumerey - Franz Vorraber & Peter Härtling (Narrator) - Label: K&K Verlagsanstalt
- 2008: Grand Piano Masters ~ Impromptu - Works by Franz Schubert - Label: K&K Verlagsanstalt
- 2011: Hommage à Schumann - Works by Franz Schubert, Robert Schumann, Johannes Brahms & Franz Vorraber - Label: Thorofon
- 2013: Sätze von Liebe (Sentences of Love) - Franz Vorraber (Piano & Compositions) & Peter Härtling (narrator) - Label: K&K Verlagsanstalt
