= Piano Trio No. 2 (Dvořák) =

1876 composition by Antonín Dvořák

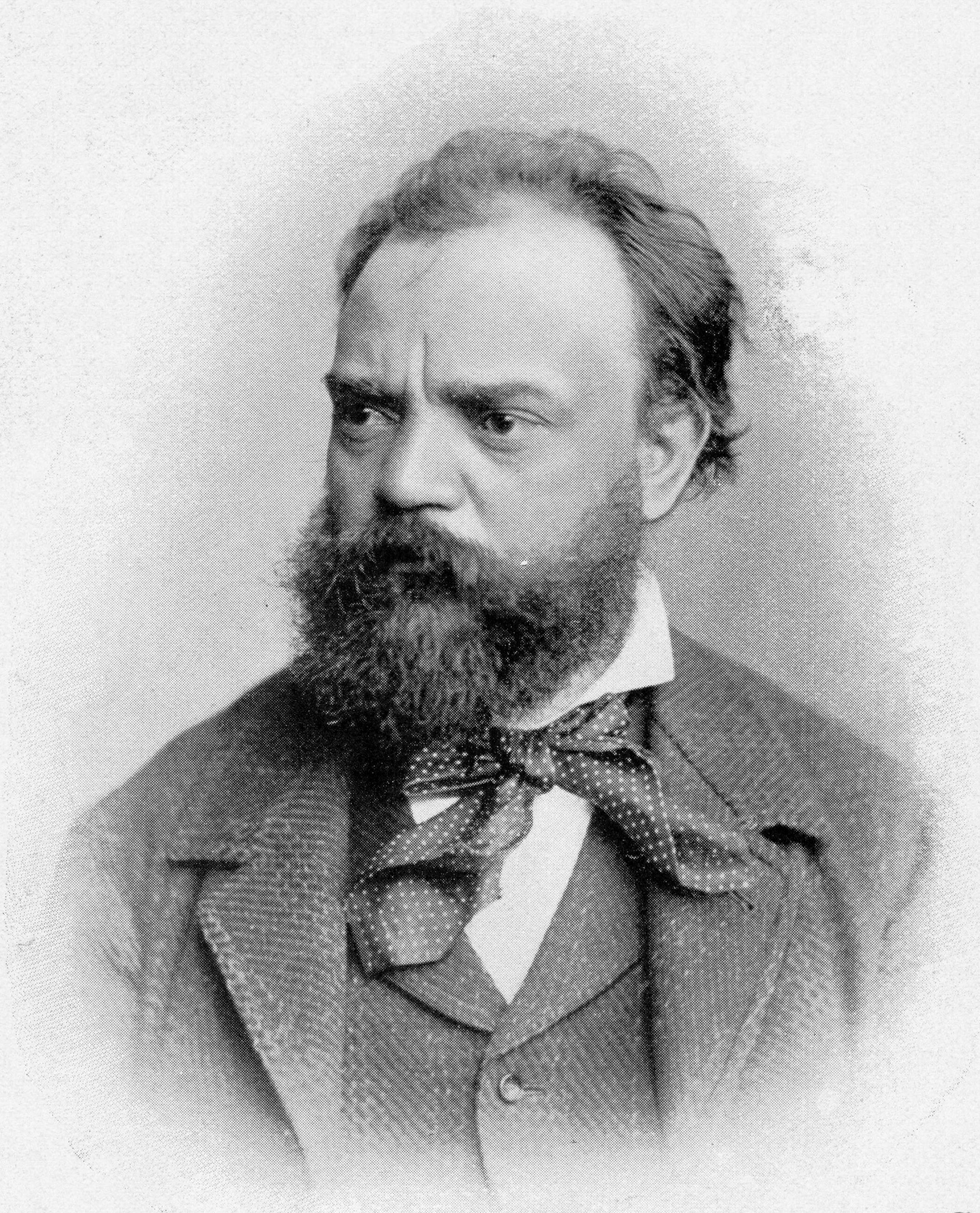
Antonín Dvořák in 1882

Antonín Dvořák's Piano Trio No. 2 in G minor, Op. 26 (B. 56), is a chamber composition, written in 1876. The trio was written shortly after the death of his eldest daughter Josefa, and although Dvorak never wrote that the piece was intended as a memorial it is generally regarded as such. The third movement foreshadows the more well-known Slavonic Dances.

It was written 4th to 20th January 1876, and first performed 29th June 1879, at Turnov, by Ferdinand Lachner and Alois Neruda, with the composer playing the piano.

== Structure ==
The composition consists of four movements in the classical tradition:

1. Allegro moderato
2. Largo
3. Scherzo: Presto – Trio: Poco meno mosso – Presto da capo
4. Allegro non tanto

Performances take approximately 28-32 minutes.

== Recordings ==
- Beaux Arts Trio (1996):Dvorák: Complete Piano Trios, Phillips B0000041F3
- Suk Trio (2001, recorded 1977): Dvořák: Complete Piano Trios, Supraphon 3545.
- Trio Fontenay (2006): Antonin Dvorak Complete Piano Trios, Teldec B000000SHK
- Busch Trio (2019): Dvořák: Piano Trios Op. 21 & 26, Alpha Classics ALPHA 466
- Boris Giltburg, Veronika Jarůšková, Peter Jarůšek (2023): Dvorak: The Complete Piano Trios, Supraphon B0CBSF9YSX
