= K&K Verlagsanstalt =

German record label

- Founded: 1990
- Founder: Josef-Stefan Kindler, Andreas Otto Grimminger
- Genre: European classical music
- Country of origin: Germany
- Location: Landau
- Official website: www.kuk-art.com

K&K Verlagsanstalt is a German record label based in Landau in der Pfalz and owned by Josef-Stefan Kindler and Andreas Otto Grimminger.

== History ==
The company was established in 1990 by Josef-Stefan Kindler. In 1992 the musician and sound engineer Andreas Otto Grimminger joined the company, which is a member of Börsenverein des Deutschen Buchhandels. The label concentrates on audiophile concert recordings. Currently these CD-series are created by Josef-Stefan Kindler and Andreas Otto Grimminger:

- The Maulbronn Monastery Edition: A selection of about 25 concerts every year, which take place at the German UNESCO World Heritage Site Maulbronn Monastery.
- Authentic Classical Concerts: Concert recordings at interesting historical places.
- Swing & More series

== Artists and ensembles released on K&K ==
Sources:

- Amir Tebenikhin (Pianist)
- Franz Vorraber (Pianist)
- Lilya Zilberstein (Pianist)
- David Thomas (Vocal-Soloist)
- Michael Chance (Vocal-Soloist)
- Nancy Argenta (Vocal-Soloist)
- Miriam Allan (Vocal-Soloist)
- Jürgen Budday (Conductor)
- Paweł Przytocki (Conductor)
- Capella Istropolitana (Orchestra)
- Württemberg Chamber Orchestra Heilbronn
- European Union Baroque Orchestra
- Maulbronn Chamber Choir (Choir)
- Hannoversche Hofkapelle (Hanoverian Court Orchestra)
- Gabriel Rivano Trio
- Singer Pur
- Trio Fontenay
