= Casals Hall =

Concert hall in Ochanomizu, Tokyo, Japan

Casals Hall カザルスホール
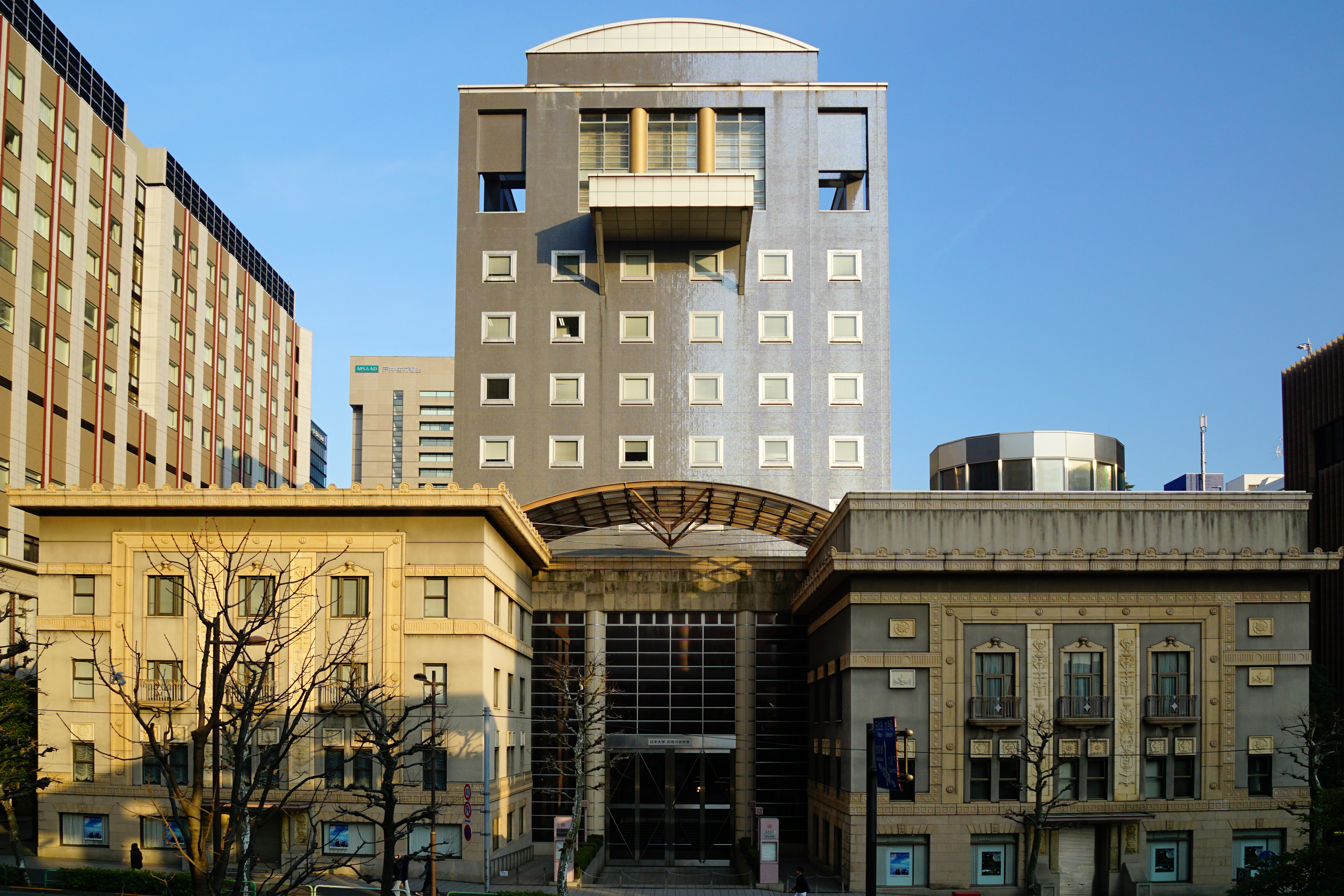
- Ochanomizu Square Building
- Interactive map of the Casals Hall カザルスホール area

General information
- Location: 1-6 Kanda-Surugadai, Chiyoda, Tokyo, Japan
- Coordinates: 35°41′50″N 139°45′45″E
- Opened: October 1987
- Cost: ¥ 7,000 million
- Owner: Nihon University

Design and construction
- Architect: Arata Isozaki
- Other designers: Nagata Acoustics

Website
- Hompepage (Jp)

References
- Factsheet

Casals Hall (カザルスホール, Kazarusu Hōru) is a concert hall in Ochanomizu, Tokyo, Japan. It is named in honour of cellist Pau Casals. The hall opened in 1987 as a venue for chamber music and has a shoebox-style auditorium which seats 511. Arata Isozaki was the architect, with acoustic design by Nagata Acoustics. In 1997, for the tenth anniversary celebrations, a 41 stop organ by Jürgen Ahrend was installed.

The hall had originally been owned and sponsored by publishers Shufunotomo Company (主婦の友社) but economic conditions resulted in the withdrawal of funding in 2000. In 2003 Nihon University acquired the Ochanomizu Square Building, of which the hall forms part, from the company. On 31 March 2010 the university closed the hall. A campaign has been launched to reopen the hall by the Save Casals Hall Committee, with pianist Iwasaki Shuku (岩崎淑) the chair and Marta Casals Istomin, Pablo Casals' widow, an honorary adviser.

== See also ==
- Pau Casals
