= Pablo Casals =

Catalan cellist and conductor (1876–1973)

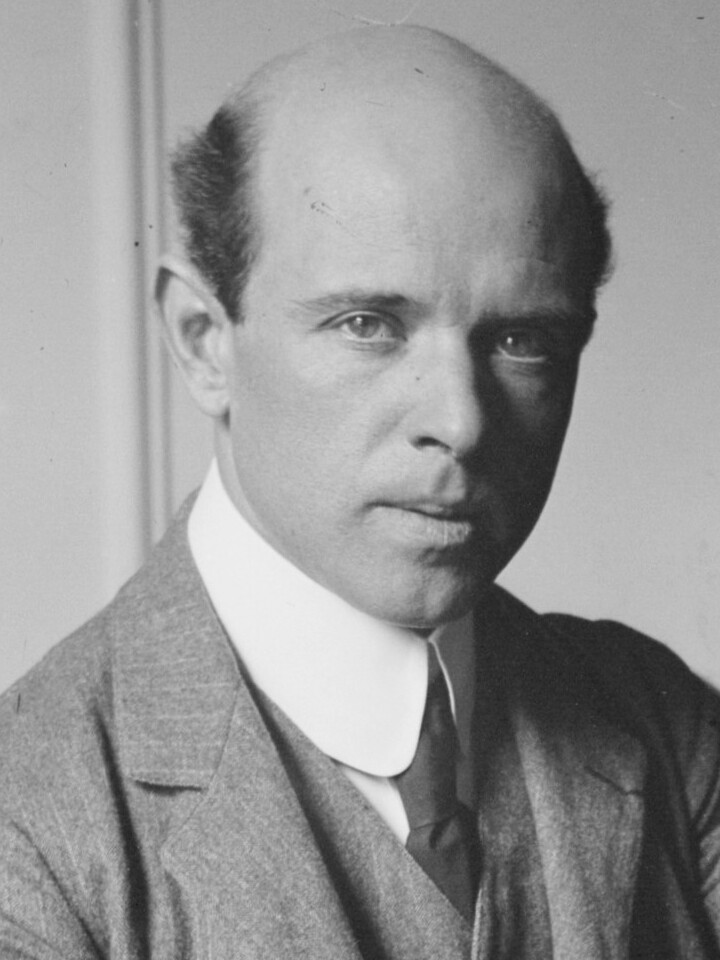
- Casals c. 1917
- Born: Pau Casals i Defilló; 29 December 1876; El Vendrell, Catalonia, Spain
- Died: 22 October 1973 (aged 96); Hato Rey, Puerto Rico
- Occupations: Cellist; Composer; Conductor
- Organizations: Orquestra Pau Casals; Casals Festival
- Awards: Presidential Medal of Freedom (1963), United Nations Peace Medal (1971), Gold Medal of the Generalitat of Catalonia (1979)

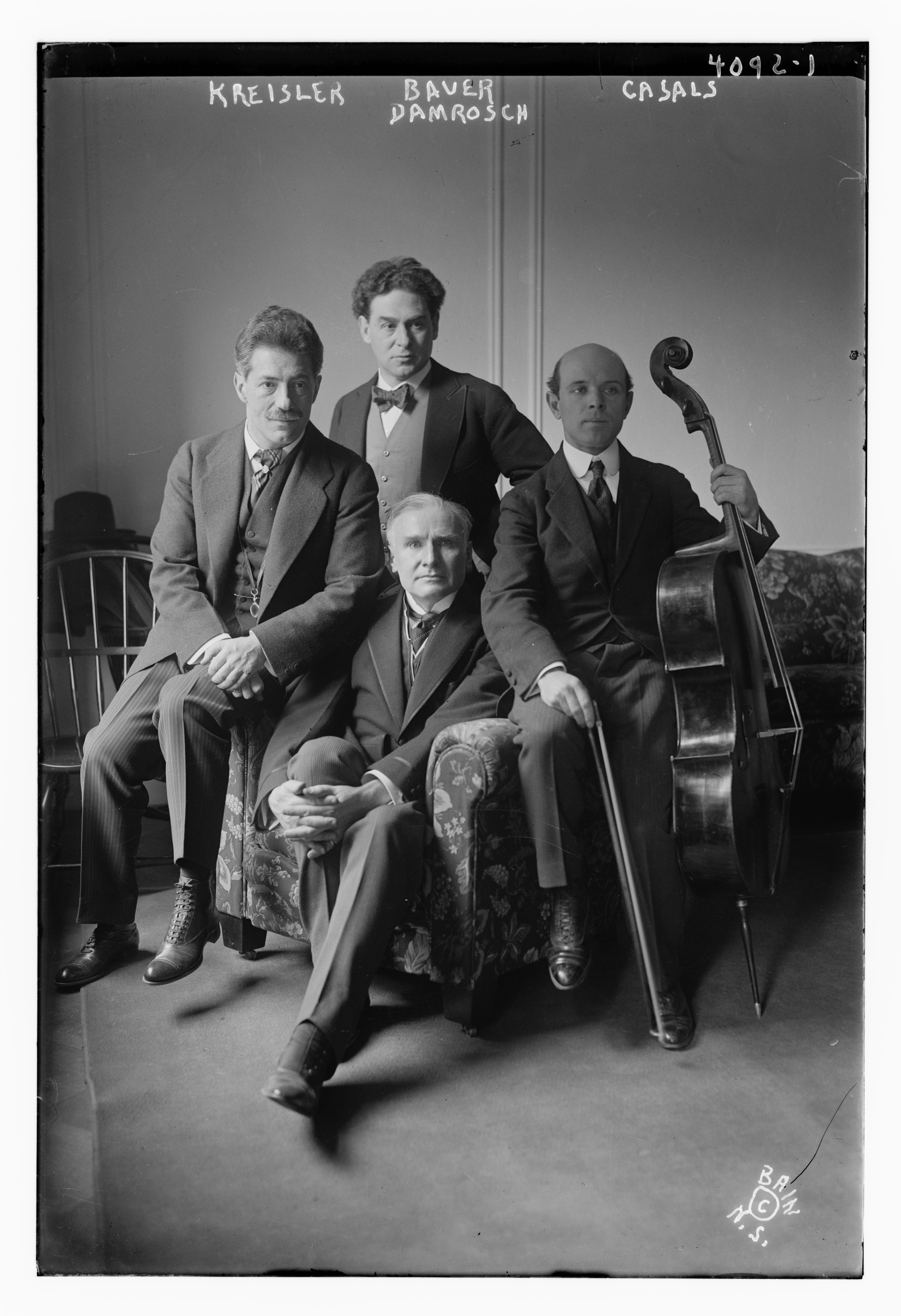
Fritz Kreisler, Harold Bauer, Walter Damrosch and Casals, at Carnegie Hall on 13 March 1917

Pablo Casals (29 December 1876 – 22 October 1973), also known by his birth name, Pau Casals i Defilló (Catalan: [ˈpaw kəˈzalz i ðəfiˈʎo]), was a Catalan cellist, composer, and conductor, born in Spain. He made many recordings throughout his career of solo, chamber, and orchestral music, including some as conductor, but he is perhaps best remembered for the recordings he made of the Cello Suites by Bach.

Casals had an international career and traveled and performed widely. With the fall of Republican Spain to the Nationalist forces of Francisco Franco in 1939, Casals went into self-exile, refusing to return to Spain until democracy was restored. He lived in Prades, France from 1939 to 1956, and then in Ceiba, Puerto Rico from 1956 until his death in 1973.

President John F. Kennedy awarded Casals the Presidential Medal of Freedom in 1963, though the ceremony was presided over by President Johnson. One of his last compositions was the Hymn to the United Nations, which he conducted at the United Nations in 1971. At that event, he was awarded the U.N. Peace Medal in recognition of his stance for peace, justice and freedom. In accepting the award, he gave a short speech I Am a Catalan and performed the traditional Catalan song, El Cant dels Ocells (Catalan: [əl ˈkan dəlz uˈseʎs], 'The Song of the Birds').

== Childhood and early years ==
Casals was born in El Vendrell, Catalonia, Spain. His father, Carles Casals i Ribes, was a parish organist and choirmaster. His mother, Doña Pilar Defilló de Casals, was born in Mayagüez, Puerto Rico, to parents who were Catalan immigrants in Puerto Rico. Casals' father gave him instruction in piano, songwriting, violin, and organ. He was also a very strict disciplinarian. When Casals was young, his father would pull the piano out from the wall and have him and his brother, Artur, stand behind it and name the notes and the scales that his father was playing. At the age of four, Casals could play the violin, piano and flute; at the age of six he played the violin well enough to perform a solo in public. His first encounter with a cello-like instrument was from witnessing a local travelling Catalan musician, who played a cello-strung broom handle. Upon request, his father built him a crude cello, using a gourd as a sound-box. When Casals was 11 years old, he first heard the real cello performed by a group of traveling musicians, and decided to dedicate himself to the instrument.

In 1888, Casals' mother took him to Barcelona, where he was enrolled in the Escola Municipal de Música. There he studied cello, theory, and piano. In 1890, when he was 13, he had a formative event. As he recalled,

For two reasons I shall never forget that afternoon. First, my father bought me my first full-size cello – how proud I was to have that wonderful instrument! Then we stopped at an old music shop near the harbour [in Barcelona]. I began browsing through a bundle of musical scores. Suddenly I came upon a sheaf of pages, crumpled and discoloured with age. They were unaccompanied suites by Johann Sebastian Bach – for the cello only! I looked at them with wonder: Six Suites for Violoncello Solo. What magic and mystery, I thought, were hidden in those words?... That scene has never grown dim.

He spent the next 13 years practicing the Six Suites every day before he would perform them in public for the first time. Casals would later make his own version of the six suites. Written in the early 1700s, but only published in 1825, this preeminent work for the cello was largely neglected until it was rediscovered, performed, and recorded by Casals.

Casals made prodigious progress as a cellist. On 23 February 1891 he gave a solo recital in Barcelona at the age of fourteen. He graduated from the Escola with honours five years later.

== Youth and studies ==
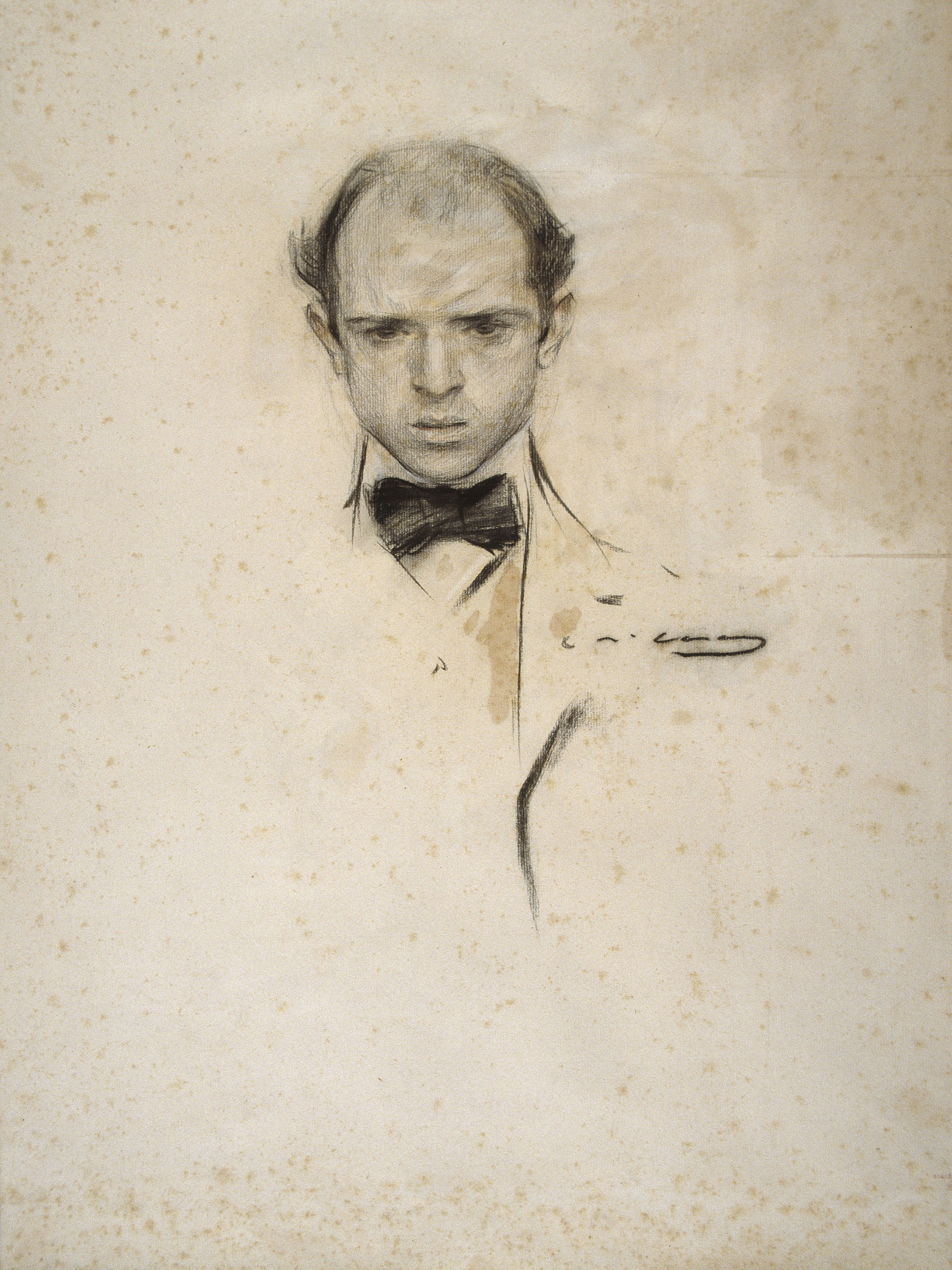
A young Pau Casals, by Ramon Casas

In 1893, Spanish composer Isaac Albéniz heard him playing in a trio in a café and gave him a letter of introduction to the Count Guillermo Morphy, the private secretary to María Cristina, the Queen Regent of Spain. Casals was asked to play at informal concerts in the palace, and was granted a royal stipend to study composition at the Madrid Royal Conservatory in Madrid with Víctor Mirecki. He also played in the newly organised Quartet Society.

In 1895, he traveled to Paris, where, having lost his stipend, he earned a living by playing second cello in the theatre orchestra of the Folies Marigny. In 1896, he returned to Spain and received an appointment to the faculty of the Escola Municipal de Música in Barcelona. He was also appointed principal cellist in the orchestra of Barcelona's opera house, the Liceu. In 1897, he appeared as soloist with the Madrid Symphony Orchestra, and was awarded the Order of Carlos III from the Queen.

== International career ==
In 1899, Casals played at The Crystal Palace in London, and later for Queen Victoria at Osborne House, her summer residence, accompanied by Ernest Walker. On 12 November, and 17 December 1899, he appeared as a soloist at the Lamoureux Concerts in Paris, to great public and critical acclaim. He toured Spain and the Netherlands with the pianist Harold Bauer from 1900 to 1901; in 1901/02, he made his first tour of the United States; and in 1903 toured South America.

On 15 January 1904, Casals was invited to play at the White House for President Theodore Roosevelt. On 9 March of that year, he made his debut at Carnegie Hall in New York, playing Richard Strauss's Don Quixote under the baton of the composer. In 1906, he became associated with the talented young Portuguese cellist Guilhermina Suggia, who studied with him and began to appear in concerts as Mme. P. Casals-Suggia, although they were not legally married. Their relationship ended in 1912.

The New York Times of 9 April 1911 announced that Casals would perform at the London Musical Festival to be held at the Queen's Hall on the second day of the Festival (23 May). The piece chosen was Haydn's Cello Concerto in D and Casals would later join Fritz Kreisler for Brahms's Double Concerto for Violin and Cello.

Although Casals made his first recordings in 1915 (a series for Columbia), he would not release another recording until 1926 (on the Victor label).

Back in Paris, Casals organized a trio with the pianist Alfred Cortot and the violinist Jacques Thibaud; they played concerts from 1906 to 1933, and made recordings from 1926 to 1929. Casals also became interested in conducting, and in 1919 he organized, in Barcelona, the Pau Casals Orchestra and led its first concert on 13 October 1920.

Casals was also a composer. Perhaps his most effective work is La Sardana, for an ensemble of cellos, which he composed in 1926.

In 1936 civil war broke out in Spain between the Nationalist forces of Francisco Franco and the Spanish Republican government. With the outbreak of the War, the Orquestra Pau Casals ceased its activities. In the last weeks of 1936, he stayed in Prades, a small village in France near the Spanish border in Pyrénées-Orientales.

Throughout most of his professional career, he played on a cello that was labeled and attributed to "Carlo Tononi ... 1733" but after he had been playing it for 50 years it was discovered to have been created by the Venetian luthier Matteo Goffriller around 1700. Casals acquired it in 1913. He also played another cello by Goffriller dated 1710, and a Tononi from 1730.

=== Exile from Spain ===
Casals was an ardent supporter of the Republican government, and after its defeat in 1939, he vowed not to return to Spain until democracy was restored. Casals performed at the Gran Teatre del Liceu on 19 October 1938, possibly his last performance in Spain before his exile. With the Fall of Barcelona in 1939, Casals left Spain to live in Prades, an historically Catalan region.

Between 1939 and 1942 he made sporadic appearances as a cellist in the unoccupied zone of southern France and in Switzerland. He was mocked by the Francoist press, which wrote articles deriding him as "a donkey", and was fined one million pesetas for his political views. So fierce was his opposition to Francoist Spain that he refused to appear in countries that recognized the Spanish government.

=== Prades Festivals ===
In 1950, he resumed his career as conductor and cellist at the Prades Festival in Conflent, organized in commemoration of the bicentenary of the death of Johann Sebastian Bach; Casals agreed to participate on condition that all proceeds were to go to a refugee hospital in nearby Perpignan.

=== Puerto Rico ===
Casals traveled extensively to Puerto Rico in 1955, inaugurating the annual Casals Festival the next year. He made an impact in the Puerto Rican music scene by founding the Puerto Rico Symphony Orchestra in 1958, the Conservatory of Music of Puerto Rico in 1959, and being a big force of inspiration and support for Evy Lucío in her founding of the San Juan Children's Choir in 1966, which he categorized as one of the best children and youth ensembles in the world.

== Later years ==
Casals appeared in the 1958 documentary film Windjammer. In the 1960s, Casals gave many master classes throughout the world in places including Gstaad, Zermatt, Tuscany, Berkeley, and Marlboro. Several of these master classes were televised.

His oratorio El Pessebre was performed for the first time in Acapulco, Mexico, on 17 December 1960. He also presented it to the United Nations during their anniversary in 1963. He was initiated as an honorary member of the Epsilon Iota chapter of Phi Mu Alpha Sinfonia music fraternity at Florida State University in 1963. He was later awarded the fraternity's Charles E. Lutton Man of Music Award in 1973.

The Presidential Medal of Freedom, awarded to Casals in 1963

=== Invited to the White House ===
Casals made a notable exception to his determination not to visit countries that had recognized the Francoist government when he took part in a concert of chamber music in the East Room at the White House on 13 November 1961. He appeared at the invitation of President John F. Kennedy, whom he admired. The occasion was a dinner given in honor of the Governor of Puerto Rico, Luis Muñoz Marín. This performance was recorded and released as an album. On 6 December 1963, Casals was awarded the U.S. Presidential Medal of Freedom.

One of his last compositions was the "Hymn of the United Nations". He conducted its first performance in a special concert at the United Nations on 24 October 1971, two months before his 95th birthday. On that day, the Secretary-General of the United Nations, U Thant, awarded Casals the U.N. Peace Medal in recognition of his stance for peace, justice and freedom. Casals accepted the medal and made his famous "I Am a Catalan" speech, where he stated that Catalonia had the first democratic parliament, long before England did.

In 1973, invited by his friend Isaac Stern, Casals arrived at Jerusalem to conduct the youth orchestra and the Jerusalem Symphony Orchestra. The Jerusalem Music Center in Mishkenot Sha'ananim was inaugurated by Casals shortly before his death. The concert he conducted with the youth orchestra at the Jerusalem Khan Theater was the last concert he conducted.

== Personal life ==
In 1914, Casals married the American socialite and singer Susan Metcalfe; they were separated in 1928, but did not divorce until 1957. During their artistic life together Casals and his wife often gave recitals together in which he accompanied her song sets at the piano and also performed cello sets in the same concert. They gave concerts in America, Europe, England, Mexico and Cuba.

In 1955, Casals married as his second wife long-time associate Francesca Vidal i Puig, who died that same year. In 1957, at age 80, Casals married 20-year-old Marta Montañez y Martinez. He is said to have dismissed concerns that marriage to someone 60 years his junior might be hazardous by saying, "I look at it this way: if she dies, she dies." Pau and Marta made their permanent residence in the town of Ceiba, and lived in a house called "El Pessebre" (The Manger).

Casals's memoirs were taken down by Albert E. Kahn, and published as Joys and Sorrows: Pablo Casals, His Own Story (1970).

=== Death ===
Casals died on October 22, 1973 at Auxilio Mutuo Hospital in Hato Rey, Puerto Rico, at the age of 96, from complications of a heart attack he had had three weeks earlier. He was buried at Puerto Rico Memorial Cemetery in Carolina, Puerto Rico. He did not live to see the end of the Francoist State, which occurred two years later, but he was posthumously honoured by the Spanish government under King Juan Carlos I which in 1976 issued a commemorative postage stamp depicting Casals, in honour of the centenary of his birth. In 1979 his remains were interred in his hometown of El Vendrell, Tarragona. In 1989, Casals was posthumously awarded a Grammy Lifetime Achievement Award.

== Legacy ==
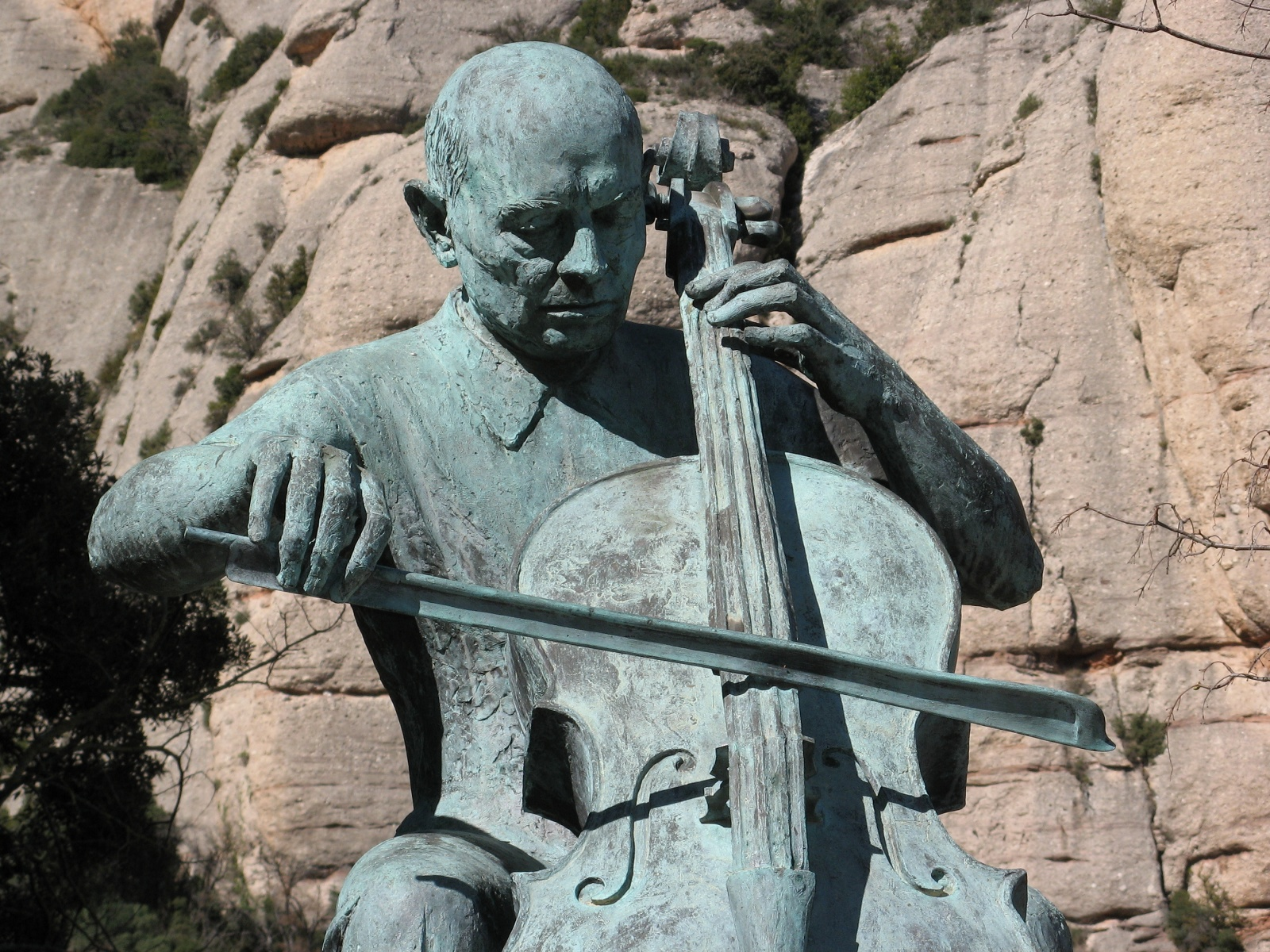
Centenary statue, by Josep Viladomat, Montserrat

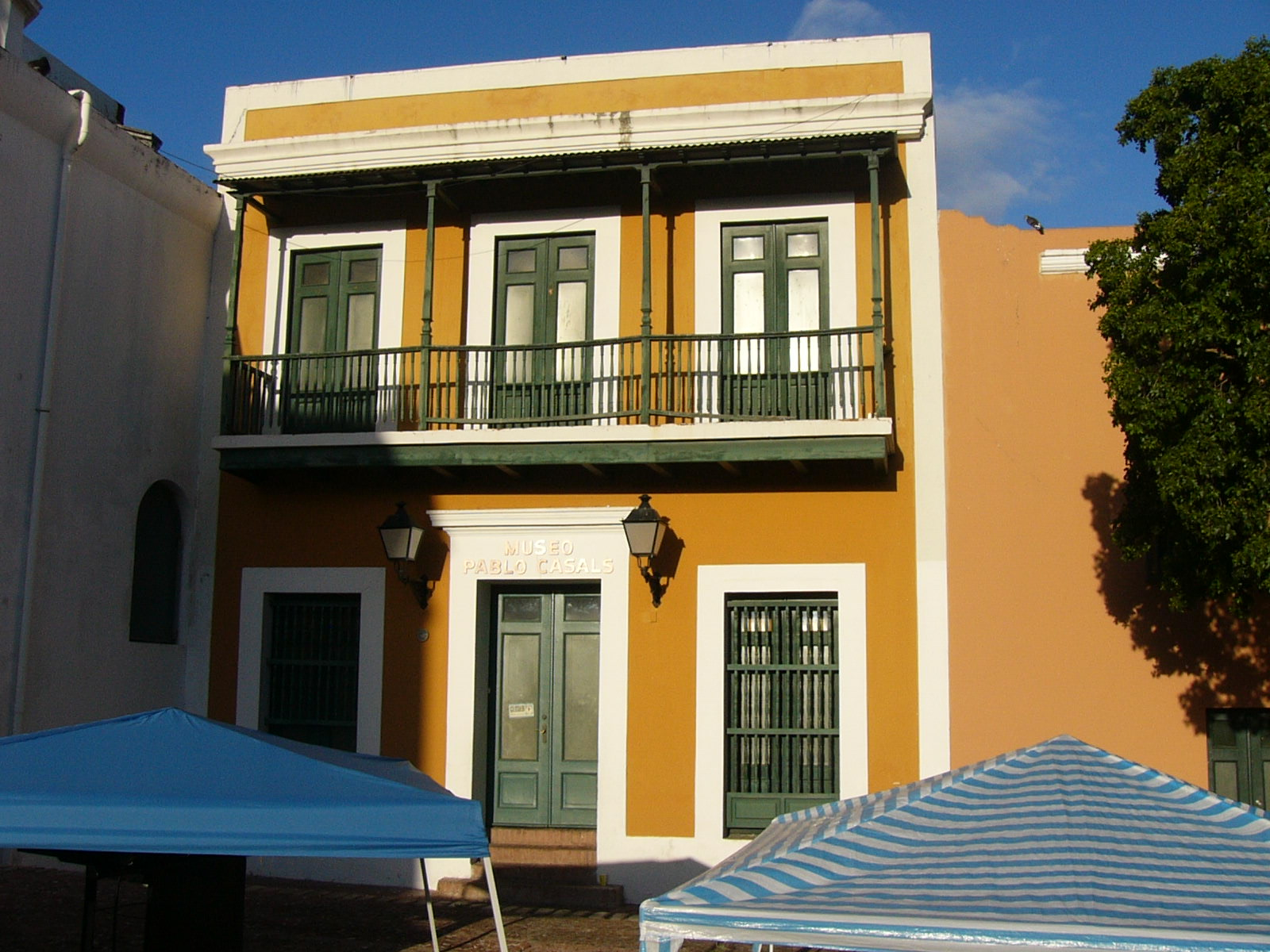
Pablo Casals Museum, in San Juan, Puerto Rico

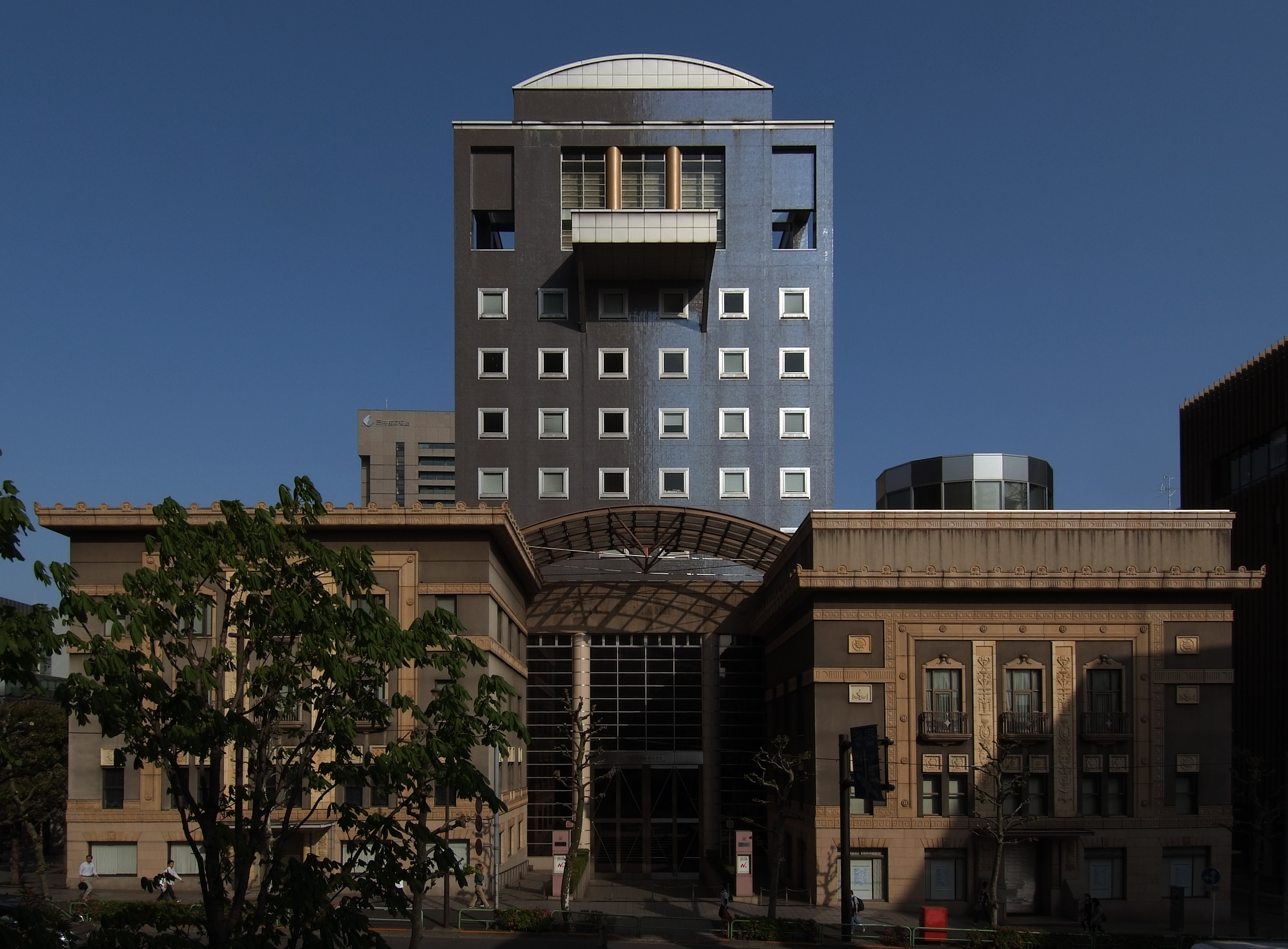
Casals Hall, by Arata Isozaki, in Tokyo, Japan

In 1959, American writer Max Eastman wrote of Casals:

He is by common consent the greatest cellist that ever lived. Fritz Kreisler went farther and described him as "the greatest man who ever drew a bow."

The southern part of the highway C-32 in Catalonia, Spain, is named Autopista de Pau Casals.

The International Pau Casals Cello Competition is held in Kronberg and Frankfurt am Main, Germany, under the auspices of the Kronberg Academy once every four years, starting in 2000, to discover and further the careers of the future cello elite, and is supported by the Pau Casals Foundation, under the patronage of his widow, Marta Casals Istomin. One of the prizes is the use of one of the Gofriller cellos owned by Casals. The first top prize was awarded in 2000 to Claudio Bohórquez.

Australian radio broadcaster Phillip Adams often fondly recalls Casals's 80th birthday press conference where, after complaining at length about the troubles of the world, he paused to conclude with the observation: "The situation is hopeless. We must take the next step".

In Puerto Rico, the Casals Festival is still celebrated annually. There is also a museum dedicated to the life of Casals located in Old San Juan. On 3 October 2009, Sala Sinfónica Pau Casals, a symphony hall named in Casals's honour, opened in San Juan, Puerto Rico. The $34 million building, designed by Rodolfo Fernandez, is the latest addition to the Centro de Bellas Artes complex. It is the new home of the Puerto Rico Symphony Orchestra.

Prades, France, is home to another Pau Casals Museum located inside the public library. Many of the artist's memorabilia and precious documents are there: photos, concert outfits, authentic letters, original scores of the Pessebre, interview soundtracks, films, paintings, a cello, and his first piano.

In Tokyo, the Casals Hall, designed by Arata Isozaki, opened in 1987 as a venue for chamber music. Pau Casals Elementary School in Chicago is named in his honor. I.S. 181 in the Bronx is also named after Casals.

Casals's motet O vos omnes, composed in 1932, is frequently performed today.

In Pablo Larraín's 2016 film Jackie, Casals is played by Roland Pidoux.

In 2019, Casal's album Bach Six Cello Suites was selected by the Library of Congress for preservation in the National Recording Registry as "culturally, historically, or aesthetically significant".

== Partial discography ==
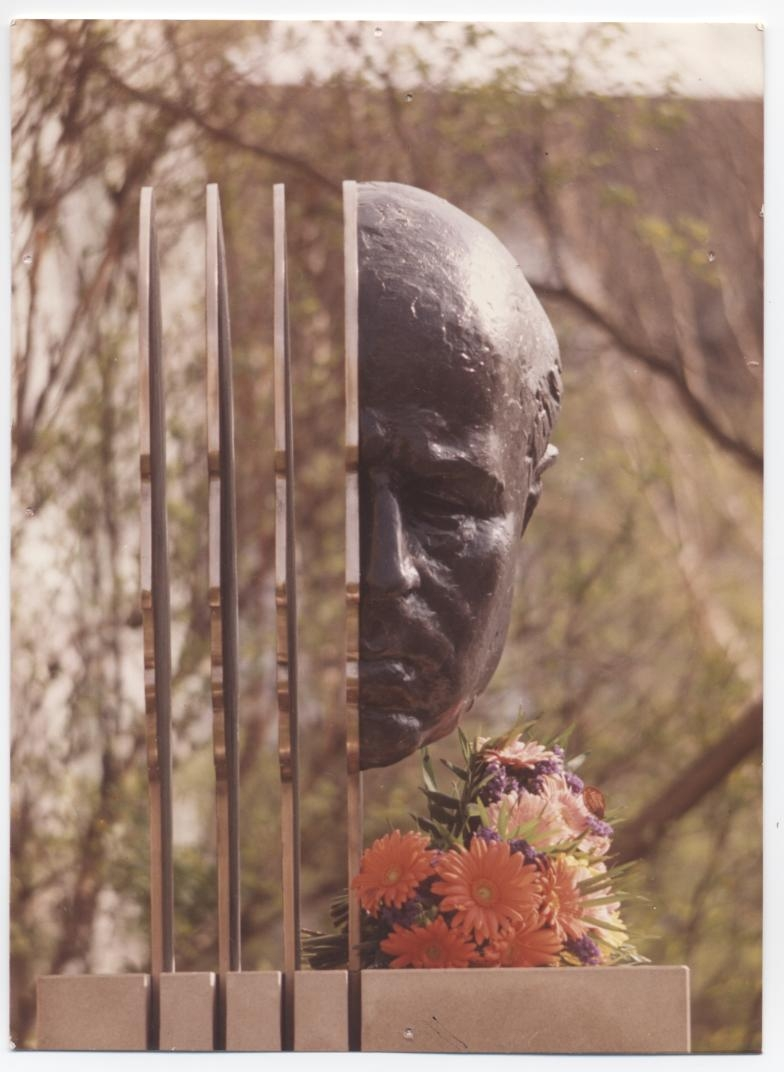
Pau Casals bust, Wolfenbüttel, Germany

- 1926–1928: Casals, Jacques Thibaud and Alfred Cortot – the first trios of Schubert, Schumann and Mendelssohn, the Beethoven Archduke, Haydn's G major and Beethoven's Kakadu Variations (recorded in London)
- 1929, Brahms: Double Concerto with Thibaud and Cortot conducting Casals's own orchestra
- 1929: Dvorak and Brahms Concerti

External audio
- You may hear Pau Casals performing Antonín Dvorak's "Cello Concerto" with George Szell conducting the Czech Philharmonic Orchestra in 1937 Here

- 1929: Beethoven: Fourth Symphony (Recorded in Barcelona)
- 1930: Beethoven: Cello Sonata Op. 69, with Otto Schulhof
- 1936–1939: Bach: Cello Suites
- 1936: Beethoven: Cello Sonata Op. 102 No. 1; and Brahms: Cello Sonata Op. 99, both with Mieczysław Horszowski
- 1936: Boccherini: Cello Concerto in B-flat; and Bruch: Kol Nidrei – London Symphony conducted by Landon Ronald
- 1937: Dvořák: Cello Concerto – Czech Philharmonic conducted by George Szell
- 1939: Beethoven: Cello Sonatas Nos. 1, 2, and 5, with Mieczysław Horszowski
- 1945: Elgar and Haydn Cello Concertos – BBC Symphony conducted by Sir Adrian Boult
- 1950: The first of the Prades Festival recordings on Columbia, including:
  - Bach: Sonatas for Viola da Gamba, BWV 1027–1029, with Paul Baumgartner
  - Schumann: Fünf Stücke im Volkston, with Leopold Mannes
  - Schumann: Cello Concerto, with Casals conducting from the cello
- 1951: At the Perpignan Festival, including:
  - Beethoven: Cello Sonata Op. 5 No. 2, and three sets of Variations, with Rudolf Serkin
  - Beethoven: Trios, Op. 1 No. 2, Op. 70 No. 2, Op. 97, and the Clarinet Op. 11 transcription; also
  - Schubert: Trio No. 1, D.898, all with Alexander Schneider and Eugene Istomin
- 1952: At Prades, including:
  - Brahms: Trio Op. 8, with Isaac Stern and Myra Hess
  - Brahms: Trio Op. 87, with Joseph Szigeti and Myra Hess
  - Schumann: Trio Op. 63, and Schubert: Trio No. 2, D.929, both with Alexander Schneider and Mieczysław Horszowski
  - Schubert: C major Quintet, with Isaac Stern, Alexander Schneider, Milton Katims, and Paul Tortelier
  - Brahms: Sextet No. 1, again with Stern, Schneider, and Katims, plus Milton Thomas and Madeline Foley
- 1953: At Prades, including:
  - Beethoven: Cello Sonatas Nos. 1, 3, 4, and 5, with Rudolf Serkin
  - Beethoven: Trios Op. 1 No. 1, and Op. 70 No. 1, with Joseph Fuchs and Eugene Istomin
  - Schumann: Cello Concerto in A minor, Op. 129, with Eugene Ormandy conducting the Festival orchestra
- 1954: At Prades (all live performances), including:
  - Beethoven: Cello Sonata No. 5, and Op. 66 Variations, with Mieczysław Horszowski
  - Beethoven: Trios Op. 70 No. 1, and Op. 121a, with Szymon Goldberg and Rudolf Serkin
- 1955: At Prades (all live performances), including:
  - Brahms: Trios Nos. 1–3, with Yehudi Menuhin and Eugene Istomin
  - Brahms: Clarinet Trio Op. 114, with clarinetist David Oppenheim and Eugene Istomin
  - Beethoven: Trio Op. 70 No. 2, with Szymon Goldberg and Rudolf Serkin
- 1956: At Prades (all live performances), including:
  - Bach: Sonata BWV 1027 for Viola da Gamba, with Mieczysław Horszowski
  - Schumann: Trio No. 2, with Yehudi Menuhin and Mieczysław Horszowski
  - Schumann: Trio No. 3, with Sándor Végh and Rudolf Serkin
- 1958: At Beethoven-Haus in Bonn (all live performances), including:
  - Beethoven: Sonata Op. 5 No. 1, with Wilhelm Kempff
  - Beethoven: Sonatas Op. 5 No. 2, Op. 102 No. 2, and the Horn Op. 17 transcription, with Mieczysław Horszowski
  - Beethoven: Trios Op. 1 No. 3, and Op. 97, with Sándor Végh and Mieczysław Horszowski
  - Beethoven: Trio Op. 70 No. 1, with Sándor Végh and Karl Engel
- 1959: At Prades (all live performances), including:
  - Haydn: "Farewell" Symphony (No. 45) and Mozart "Linz" Symphony (No. 36)
  - Beethoven: Trio Op. 1 No. 3, with Yehudi and Hephzibah Menuhin
  - Schubert: String Quintet, with the Budapest String Quartet

External audio
- You may hear Pablo Casals conducting the Marlboro Festival Orchestra with Rudolf Serkin, Peter Serkin, and Alexander Schneider performing: Johann Sebastian Bach's Brandenburg Concertos No 1-6 in 1965; Here on Archive.org

- 1960: At the Festival Casals in Puerto Rico
  - Dvořák: Concerto in B Minor for Cello and Orchestra, Op. 104, with Alexander Schneider conducting (live recording released by Everest Records)
- 1961: Mendelssohn: Piano Trio No. 1 with Alexander Schneider and Mieczysław Horszowski (Recorded live 13 November 1961 at the White House)
- 1963: Beethoven: Eighth Symphony
- 1963: Mendelssohn: Fourth Symphony, at Marlboro
- 1964–65: Bach: Brandenburg Concerti, at Marlboro
- 1966: Bach: Orchestral Suites, at Marlboro
- 1969: Beethoven: First, Second, Fourth, Sixth ("Pastorale"), and Seventh Symphonies
- 1974: El Pessebre (The Manger) oratorio
