= I Am a Catalan =

1971 speech by Pau Casals

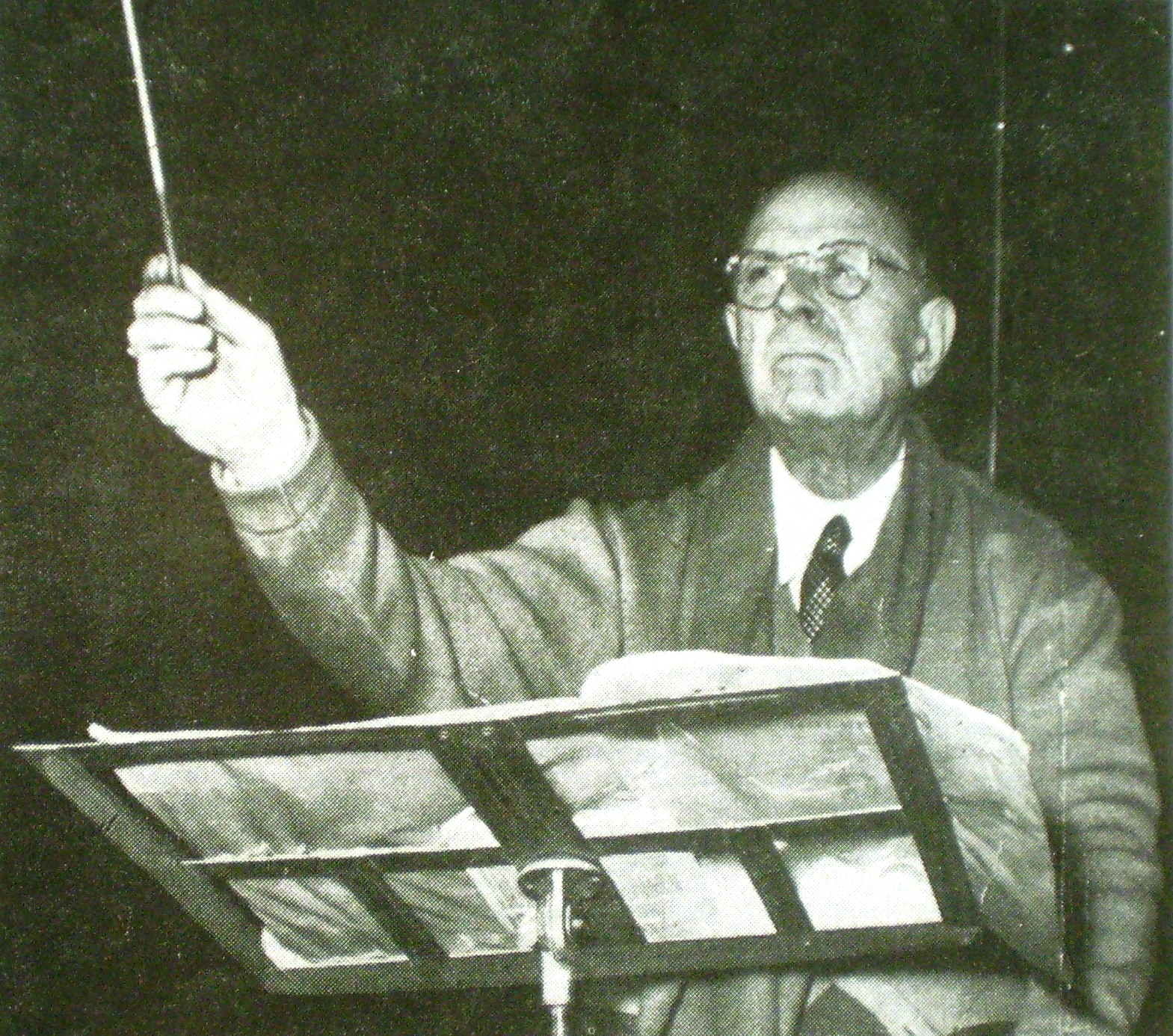
Pau Casals

"I Am a Catalan" is the name given to a short speech given by cellist and humanist Pau Casals in front of the General Assembly of the United Nations on 24 October 1971. Casals was in front of the assembly to present the "Hymn of the United Nations" composed by himself and to receive the U.N. Peace Medal in recognition of his stance on peace, justice, and freedom. In his acceptance speech, in English, he praised Catalonia and the Peace and Truce of God meetings, which he refers to as "the first parliament":

But let me say one thing. I am a Catalan. Today a province of Spain. But what has been Catalonia? Catalonia has been the greatest nation in the world. I will tell you why. Catalonia has had the first parliament, much before England. Catalonia had the beginning of the United Nations. All the authorities of Catalonia in the 11th century met in a city of France, at that time Catalonia, to speak about peace. 11th century! Peace in the world and against, against, against war, the inhumanity and brutality of war. This was Catalonia. I am so so happy, so moved to be here, with you.

— Pau Casals

After the speech Casals, 94 years old, performed one of his most popular pieces, "El Cant dels Ocells".

The speech had a major impact on Catalan society living in the Francoist state. It became a popular motto within Catalan nationalist circles; Catalans saw their national identity and history recognized worldwide by one of their greatest citizens.

Casals received the Gold Medal of the Generalitat of Catalonia in 1979, 6 years after his death.
