= Lilya Zilberstein =

Russian-born German pianist

Lilya Efimovna Zilberstein (Russian: Лилия Ефимовна Зильберштейн; born 19 April 1965) is a Russian-born German pianist.

== Biography ==
Born in Moscow and educated at the Gnessin State Musical College (1971–88), she rose to prominence after winning the 1987 Concorso Busoni. This success opened up the Italian halls to her, and as soon as she graduated she embarked on a tour, debuting in the Maggio Musicale Fiorentino. She finished with her German debut in Munich and she was immediately contracted by Deutsche Grammophon. She settled in Hamburg two years later, where she still lives with her husband and her two sons, Daniel and Anton. She has since had a successful concert career. She has been teaching at the Accademia Musicale Chigiana in Siena since 2011.

== Selected discography ==
- Johannes Brahms - Variations on a theme by Paganini, op.35; Intermezzi op.117; 6 Pieces, op.118. 1990, Deutsche Grammophon.
- Brahms - 3rd Violin Sonata, op.108, along with Maxim Vengerov. EMI
- Brahms - Sonata for two pianos, op.34b, along with Martha Argerich. 2002, EMI.
- Brahms - 1st Piano Concerto, op.15; Tragic Overture [4 hands Brahms' arrangement], along with Cord Garben. Hänssler Classic
- Frédéric Chopin - 1st Piano Sonata, op.4; Mazurkas B. 4, 16, 73, 82, 85, 134, 140; Rondos op.1, 5., Waltzes in E flat major (op. posth KK 1237), and in A minor (op. posth, KK 1238–9), Deutsche Grammophon.
- Edvard Grieg - Piano Concerto, op.16. Gothenburg Symphony Orchestra - Neeme Järvi. Deutsche Grammophon.
- Modest Mussorgsky - Pictures at an exhibition; Nikolai Medtner - 8 Forgotten Melodies, op.38 (selection); Sergei Taneyev - Prelude and Fugue, op.29
- Sergei Rachmaninoff - 2nd Piano Concerto, op.18; 3rd Piano Concerto, op.30. Berliner Philharmoniker - Claudio Abbado. Deutsche Grammophon.
- Rachmaninoff - Cello Sonata, op.19, along with Gautier Capuçon. 2002, EMI.
- Rachmaninoff - Preludes, op.32 - Deutsche Grammophon
- Franz Schubert - Sonata D.850; Franz Liszt - Aprés une lecture du Dante; Schubert/Liszt - Gretchen am Spinnrade. 1990, Deutsche Grammophon.
- Dmitri Shostakovich - 1st Piano Sonata op.12 - Deutsche Grammophon.
- Shostakovich - Concertino for two piano op.94 - along with Martha Argerich. 2006, EMI
- Ludwig van Beethoven - Sonata No. 2 in A Major, Op. 2. Live, 2007, K&K Verlagsanstalt.
- Beethoven - Sonata No. 23 in F Minor, Op. 57 "Appassionata". Live, 2007, K&K Verlagsanstalt.
- Brahms - Eight Pieces for Piano Opus 76. Live, 2008, K&K Verlagsanstalt.
- Brahms - Eleven variations on an original theme in D major Opus 21, No. 1. Live, 2008, K&K Verlagsanstalt.
- Brahms - Fourteen variations on a Hungarian melody in D major Opus 21, No. 2. Live, 2008, K&K Verlagsanstalt.
- Balakirev - Piano Concerto no. 2 in E flat, op. posthumous - live performance on YouTube.
