= Eugene Istomin =

American pianist (1925–2003)

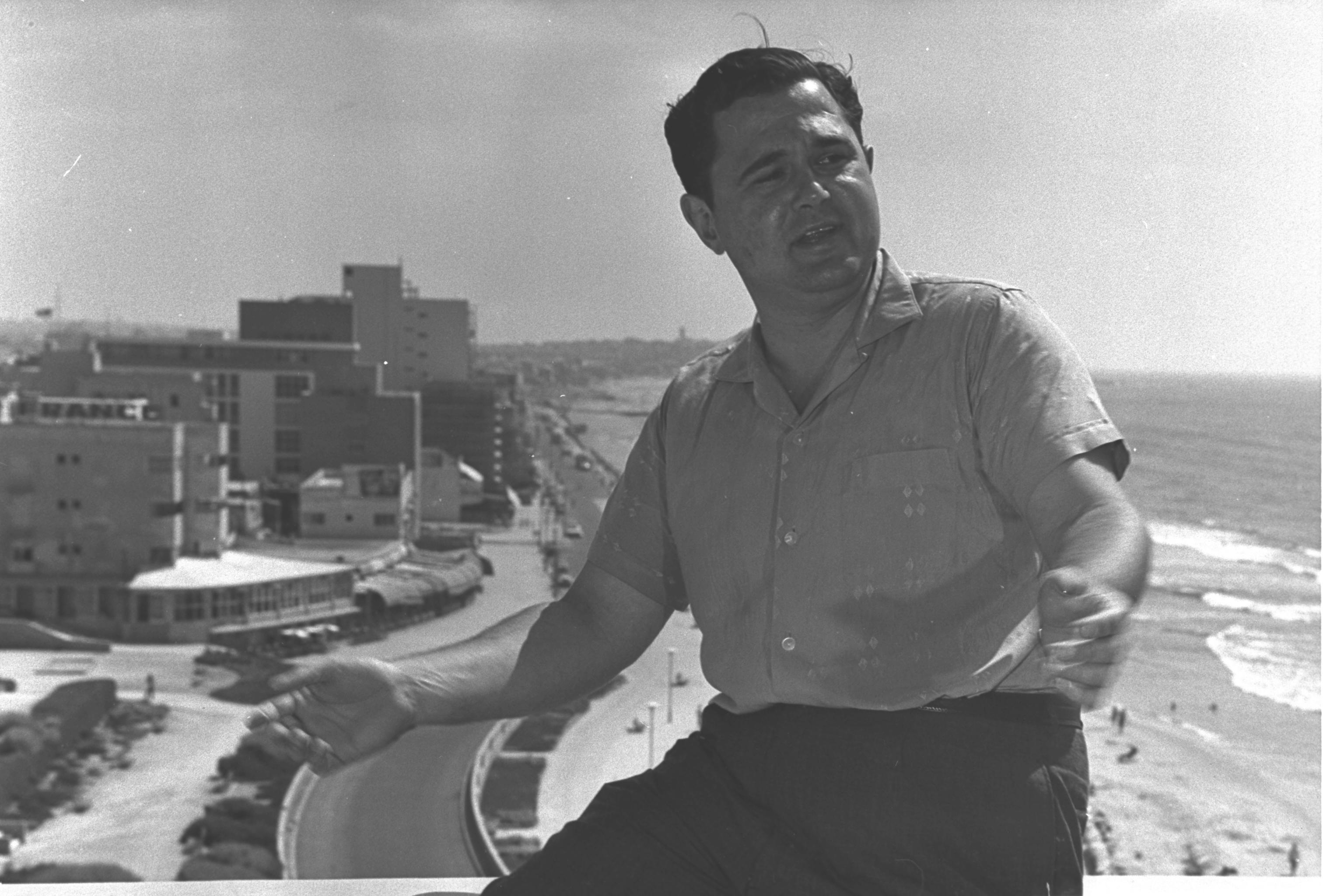
Eugene Istomin, Tel Aviv, 1961

Eugene George Istomin (November 26, 1925 – October 10, 2003) was an American pianist. He was a winner of the Leventritt Award and recorded extensively as a soloist and in a piano trio in which he collaborated with Isaac Stern and Leonard Rose.

== Career ==
Born in New York City of Russian-Jewish and Ukrainian-Jewish parents, Istomin was a child prodigy who in his early years studied at the Mannes School of Music. His earliest public performances began at age six with his mother, and at 13 he entered the Curtis Institute, having had earlier advice from Alexander Siloti and his daughter Kyriena. He went on to study under Rudolf Serkin and Mieczysław Horszowski. He also studied with Sascha Gorodnitzki.

In 1943, at the age of 17, he won the Leventritt award and the Philadelphia Youth Award. He made his debut with the Philadelphia Orchestra with Eugene Ormandy, playing a concerto by Chopin, and the New York Philharmonic conducted by Artur Rodziński playing Brahms' Piano Concerto No. 2 in the same week in 1943.

He performed with the conductor Rodzinski and the New York Philharmonic a second time in December 1944, playing Beethoven's Fourth Piano Concerto.

His first recording, which brought him considerable acclaim, was of Bach's D minor Concerto with the Busch Chamber Players.

Starting in 1950, Istomin became a regular participant at the Prades Festival organized by the famous cellist Pablo Casals.

He commissioned and premiered Roger Sessions's piano concerto in 1956. Several other composers, including Henri Dutilleux and Ned Rorem, wrote music for him.

The Istomin-Stern-Rose Trio he formed with Isaac Stern and Leonard Rose made many recordings, particularly of music by Beethoven, Brahms and Schubert. He won a Grammy Award in 1970 with the Istomin-Stern-Rose Trio for their recordings of Beethoven. He also was known as a soloist, performing many concerts of orchestral music, with conductors such as Eugene Ormandy, Bruno Walter, Leonard Bernstein, Fritz Reiner, George Szell and Leopold Stokowski.

He recorded extensively for Columbia (later Sony Classical), solo works and chamber music. As late as 2001, he made the world premiere recording of Paul Paray's Fantaisie for Piano and Orchestra, with the Budapest Symphony Orchestra under Jean-Bernard Pommier.

He married Marta Montañez Martínez (Marta Casals Istomin), the widow of Pablo Casals, on February 15, 1975. She is a former president of the Manhattan School of Music and former artistic director of the Kennedy Center for the Performing Arts in Washington, D.C. He moved to Washington in 1980.

He was an avid reader and book collector and, eventually, attracted the interest of New York publishing magnate, William Jovanovich. In 1980, Istomin was hired by Harcourt Brace Jovanovich Publishers to advise the company in the publication of facsimile editions of original editions by Joseph Conrad and Thomas Hardy, among others.

In the 1980s and 1990s, he toured 30 American cities—largely in the Midwest—in a twelve-ton truck with his own Steinway pianos and piano tuner. Better known in Europe than in the United States, Eugene Istomin received the French Légion d'honneur in 2001.

He died of liver cancer in 2003 at his home in Washington.

== Awards and recognitions ==
Grammy Award for Best Chamber Music Performance:

- Eugene Istomin, Leonard Rose & Isaac Stern for Beethoven: The Complete Piano Trios (1971)
