= Piano Trio No. 2 (Brahms) =

1882 composition by Johannes Brahms

Piano Trio in C major
- No. 2
- by Johannes Brahms
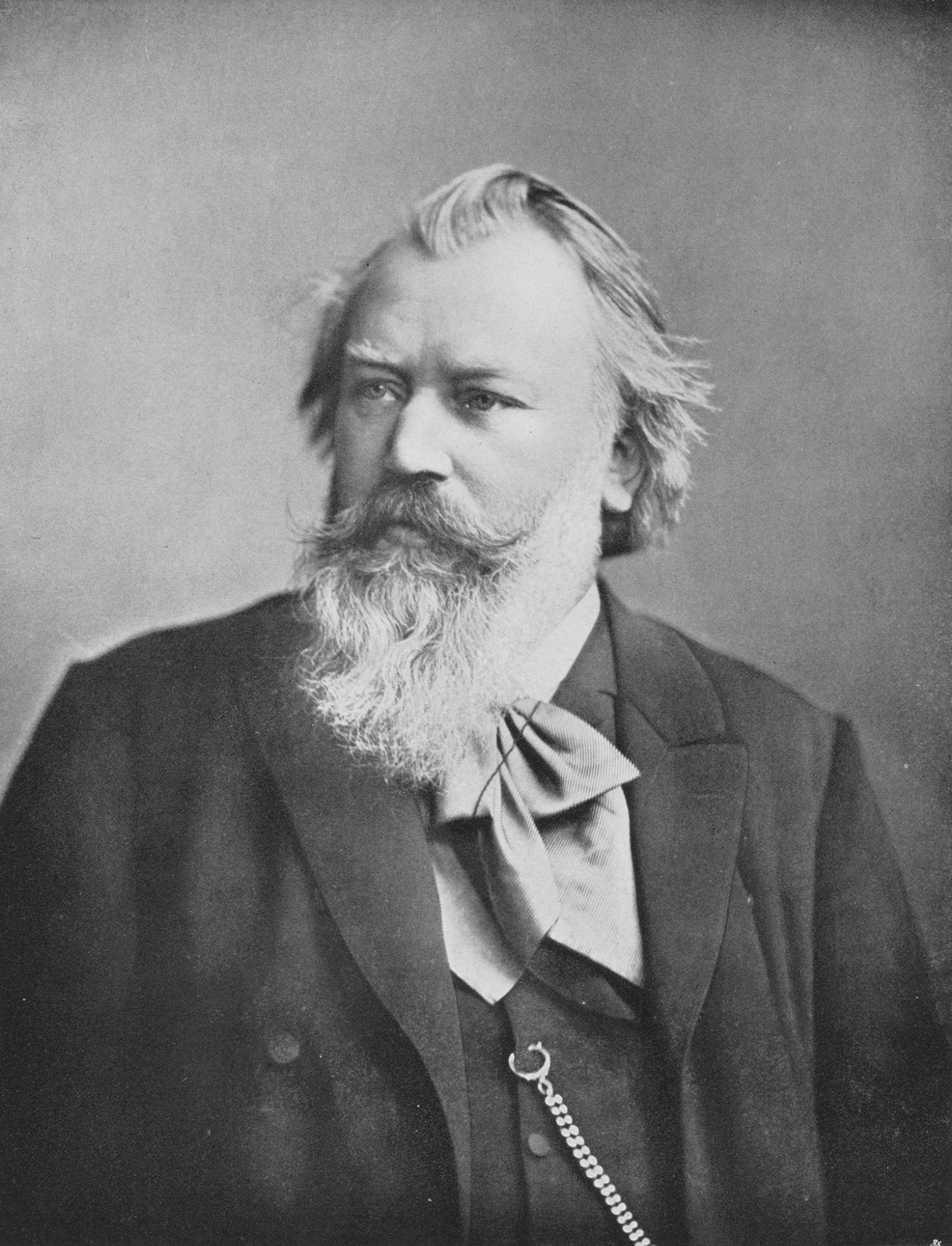
- Johannes Brahms in 1889
- Key: C major
- Opus: 87
- Composed: 1880–1882
- Performed: 29 December 1882: Frankfurt, Germany
- Movements: Four

Johannes Brahms composed his Piano Trio No. 2 in C major, Op. 87, between 1880 and 1882. It is scored for piano, violin and cello.

A typical performance lasts roughly 27 to 30 minutes.

== History ==
In early 1880, Brahms began working on two new piano trios, one in C major, the other in E♭ major. By June, he completed an Allegro movement for each of them, and showed them to Clara Schumann, who preferred the E♭-major piece. However, he set these two movements aside while he worked on his Piano Concerto No. 2 and Symphony No. 3. He picked them up again two years later, destroying the E♭ major Allegro to concentrate on the C-major piece.

He completed the remaining three movements in the summer of 1882 while on vacation in the spa town of Bad Ischl, Upper Austria, having temporarily put oit aside while there to compose his String Quintet No. 1, Op. 88. The piece was the only piano trio shown to his confidants Clara Schumann and Theodor Billroth which was later published.

== Analysis ==
The trio is in four movements:

1. Allegro moderato
2. Andante con moto
3. Scherzo
4. Allegro giocoso

=== I. Allegro moderato ===
The first movement is in sonata form and written in C major and 3/4 time. It is noteworthy for the extensive amount of developmental material presented in the exposition. The rhythmic pulse is frequently manipulated through obscuring bar lines and hemiolas feeling in 2 against 3. The strings often play in unison, with strong melodic and contrapuntal importance, in contrast to the piano line.

=== II. Andante con moto ===
This movement, written in A minor and 2/4 (later 6/8 time) is a theme and variations. The original theme is followed by 5 variations, and each formal section is 27 measures long. Each variation includes a rhythmic or melodic fragment from the original theme, but is otherwise harmonized, phrased, and ornamented differently. Variations 1, 3, and 5 draw from the theme's melody, while variations 2 and 4 rely more on figures of the piano's accompaniment. The movement features frequent syncopation especially in the coda, and the cello often echoes the violin in inversion. The material of the theme was originally composed, and inspired by the traditional Hungarian musical style.

=== III. Scherzo ===
The third movement is a presto C minor in 6/8 time formally composed of a scherzo and trio: arranged in an ABA format. The A section is rhythmically complex while the B section is more lyrical and melodic. It features frequent pianissimo dynamics, and suggests the same mood as the third movement of Brahms' Violin Sonata No. 3 in D minor, Op. 108. This movement has a lighter texture in comparison to the others. The piano mainly accompanies the strings, providing rhythmic motion. It is unclear if Brahms revised the trio section after hearing the critiques of Clara Schumann.

=== IV. Allegro giocoso ===
The finale is in 4/4 time and the key of C major. It contains many rapid range changes as well as a denser texture than the second and third movements prior. The form is ambiguous, but includes elements of a sonata form and a rondo form. The movement is distinct for its 4 contrasting themes, which are each differently scored. The A theme is treated exclusively, while the other three themes are based on its melodic elements and or rhythmic figures. The A theme's return is highly ornamented while other repetitions are literal. The recap is followed by a long coda in which the energy intensifies until the end. The contrary motion featured in this movement was supposedly inspired by the arpeggios Brahms played in his daily warm-up routine at the piano.

== Reception ==
The piece was premiered on December 29, 1882 by Brahms himself on piano, violinist Hugo Heermann, and Adolf Müller (cellist of the Joachim Quartet at the time), at a chamber music museum concert in Frankfurt. The program also presented the premiere of String Quintet No. 1 in F major, Op. 88. The audience did not like the piano trio as much as the string quintet, but Clara Schumann admired it for its fluid thematic evolution and phrase structure. Early performances of the piece occurred in Berlin, London and Vienna in January of the following year. It was published in 1883 along with Op. 88. The self-critical Brahms held this trio in high regard, writing to his publisher that they had “not yet had such a beautiful trio from me and very likely have not published its equal in the last ten years.”
