= Thorofon Records =

Classical record label based in Wedemark, Germany

Thorofon Schallplatten KG is a classical record label based in Wedemark, Germany.

Among the several series of recordings the label has published, there are works and titles such as Ludwig van Beethoven's piano sonatas, the complete works for solo piano by Johannes Brahms, the chamber music by Josef Rheinberger, the complete piano works of Robert Schumann, and a complete recording of the work of Max Reger. The label offers a number of recordings of out-of-the-mainstream classical music, almost all with some tie to Germany, such as a near-complete discography of Hugo Distler or the complete works of Louis Ferdinand, Prince of Prussia. The label has received several awards, such as the ECHO Klassik, which they received 17 times.
