= Gabriel Rivano =

- Born: Gabriel Rivano; Buenos Aires, Argentina
- Genres: Nuevo tango, tango Argentino, classical, folk
- Occupations: Composer, Bandoneón player

Gabriel Rivano is an Argentine bandoneonist, guitarist, flutist and composer, born in Buenos Aires in 1958.

He pursued studies at the Colegio Nacional de Buenos Aires where he graduated in 1976, and took his degree in Economics at the Universidad Nacional de Buenos Aires. He also was a soccer player and bandoneón player.

In 1990 Gabriel Rivano established the "Gabriel Rivano Quinteto". For this ensemble he composed numerous pieces of chamber music and several concerts, classified in the genres of classical music, jazz and folk music.

His "Concierto para Bandoneón y Orquesta" (concert for bandoneon, guitar and orchestra) had its world premiere at the "Teatro Colón" in Buenos Aires in 1997, which was awarded with the 1st prize in the international competition organized by Secretaría de Cultura de la Nación Argentina.

Gabriel Rivano's grandfather was the Argentine bandoneonist Adolfo Perez Pocholo.

== Discography ==
- 1990: Gabriel Rivano
- 1993: Mestizo
- 1997: Tradición
- 2000: Porto Seguro
- 2002: Bach en Buenos Aires
- 2003: Infierno Porteño
- 2003: Tangos y Milongas
- 2003: Piazzola en bandoneón
- 2006: Meditacion Beat
- 2007: La Luminosa
- 2009: Tangos Nuevos
