= Piano Trio No. 3 (Brahms) =

Piano Trio in C minor
- No. 3
- by Johannes Brahms
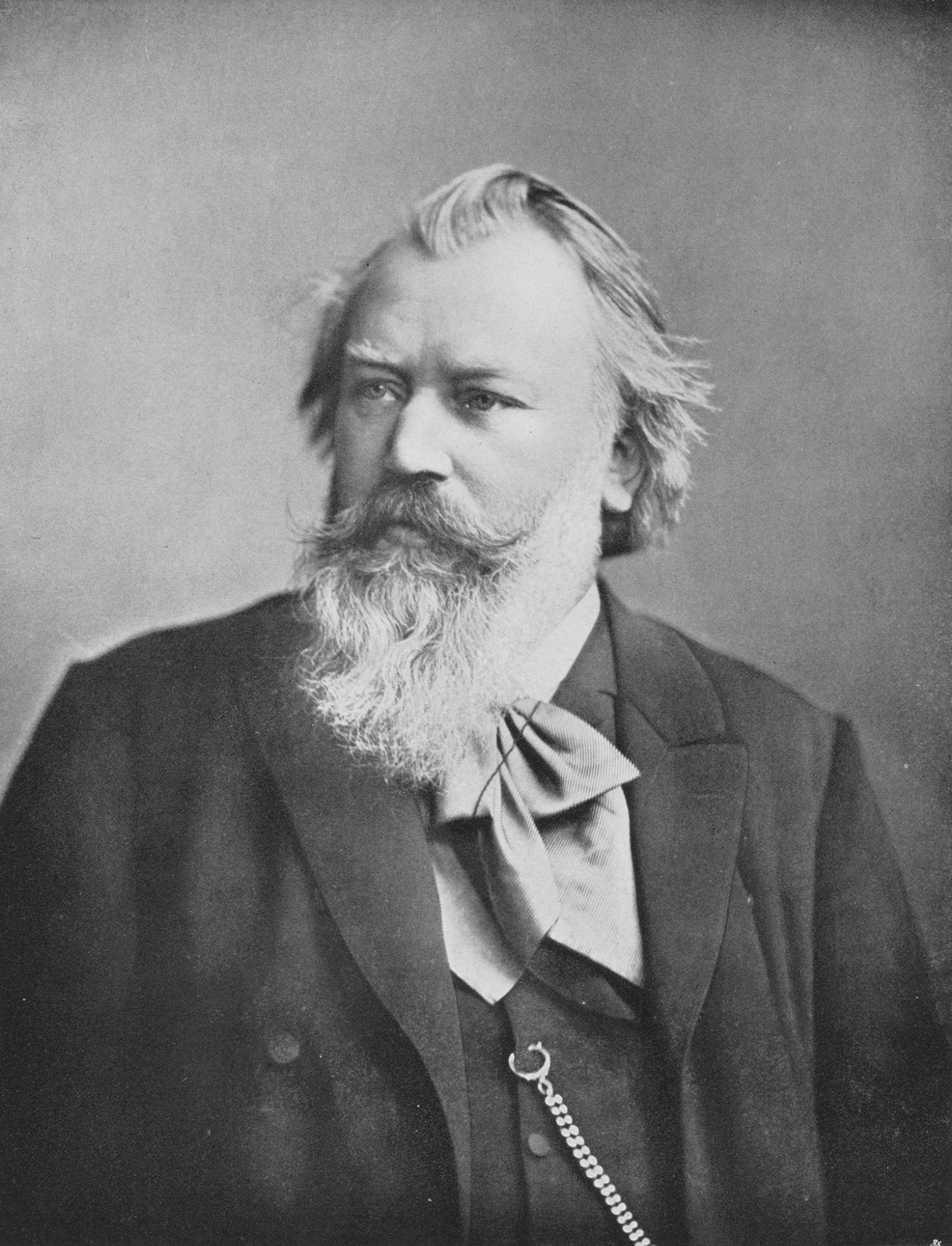
- Johannes Brahms in 1889
- Key: C minor
- Opus: 101
- Composed: 1886
- Published: 1887
- Movements: Four

The Piano Trio No. 3 in C minor, Op. 101, by Johannes Brahms is scored for piano, violin and cello, and was written in the summer of 1886 while Brahms was on holiday in Hofstetten, Switzerland. It was premiered on 20 December of that year by Brahms, violinist Jenő Hubay, and cellist David Popper.

== Structure ==
The trio is in four movements:

1. Allegro energico (C minor)
2. Presto non assai (C minor)
3. Andante grazioso (C major)
4. Allegro molto (C minor, ends in C major)

The first movement is in sonata form. Orrin Howard calls this movement "unrelentingly compulsive," and James Keller say the first theme "springs into action with a furious outburst, rather in the mode of a Beethovenian eruption," which is balanced by the "aristocratic poise" of the second theme. The entire movement is organized with terse economy. Brahms’s friend Heinrich von Herzogenberg wrote, "Smaller men will hardly trust themselves to proceed so laconically without forfeiting some of what they have to say."

The second movement takes the form of an intermezzo in ternary form, in place of the traditional scherzo and trio. Keller calls this a "mere will-o’-wisp of a scherzo." Howard writes: "It is a peculiar little movement, hypnotic as it continually reflects its motivic and rhythmic ideas, until we are almost shocked to discover that time has passed."

The third movement, also in ternary form, involves the use of alternating time signatures: 3/4 and 2/4, as well as 9/8 and 6/8. Keller writes: "With the third movement we turn to an ultra-familiar Brahmsian landscape: an intermezzo, characteristically marked Andante grazioso. But where most Brahms intermezzos are calm and consoling, perhaps dreamy, this one may leave listeners feeling uneasy in a way that may seem hard to pin down."

The last movement is in sonata form. Howard calls this movement "rhythmically intense," and Keller writes, "By now we will understand that this piano trio is to a large extent “about” rhythmic variety, and the finale carries that idea through to the end through an abundance of hemiolas (i.e. brief passages of duple against triple meter), falsely placed accents, and cross-rhythms."
