= Marta Casals Istomin =

Puerto Rican musician (born 1936)

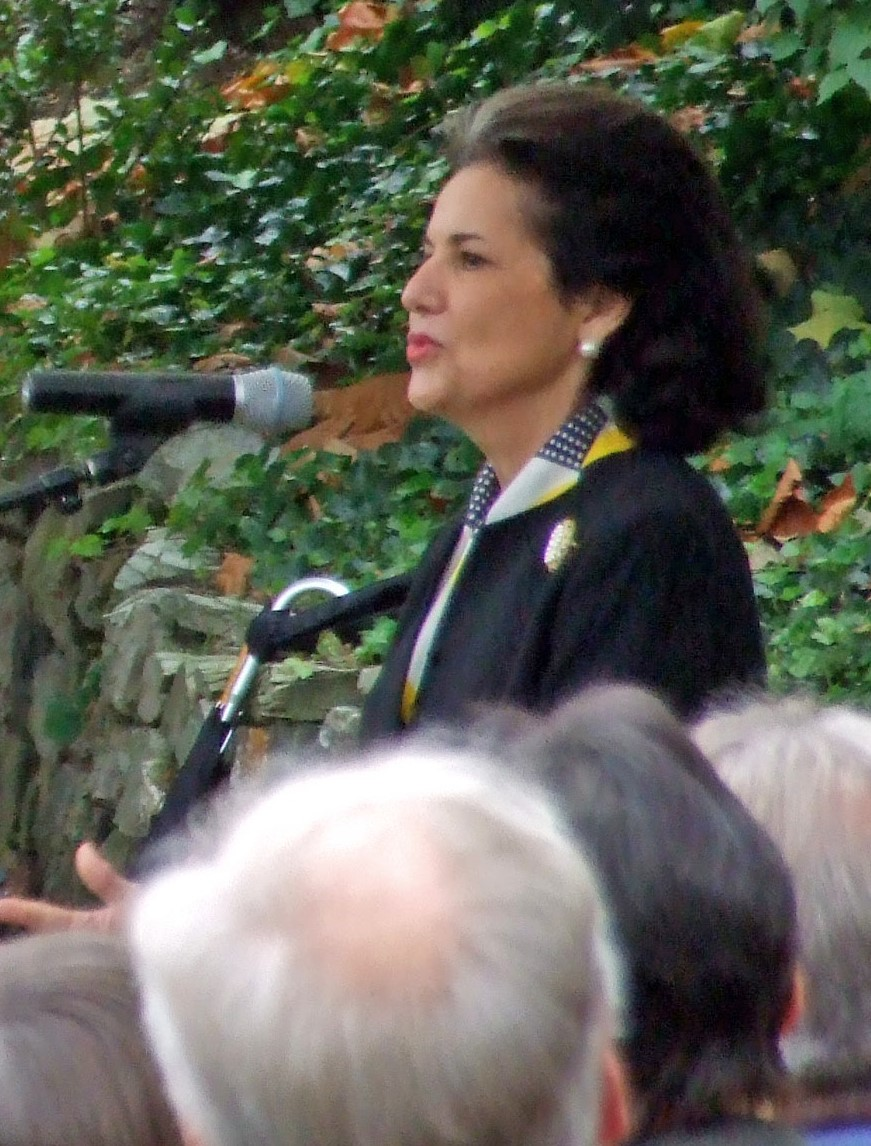
- Marta Casals Istomin (2007)

Background information
- Born: Marta Montañez Martínez; November 2, 1936 (age 89); Humacao, Puerto Rico
- Genres: Classical
- Occupation(s): Musician and member of the Manhattan School of Music's board of directors
- Instrument(s): Violin and cello

Marta Casals Istomin (born November 2, 1936), who uses the surnames of her first husband, Pablo Casals, and her second husband, Eugene Istomin, is a musician from Puerto Rico, and the former president of the Manhattan School of Music. She served as artistic director of the Kennedy Center from 1980 to 1990.

== Early years ==
Casals Istomin was born Marta Montañez Martínez in Humacao, Puerto Rico, to a family of amateur musicians. As a child she was influenced by musical surroundings which were instrumental in the development of her love for music. She received her primary education in her hometown. Her uncle, Rafael Montañez, taught her the fundamentals of the violin at the age of six. After she finished her primary education, she attended the Marymount School, New York, for four years.

== Pablo Casals ==
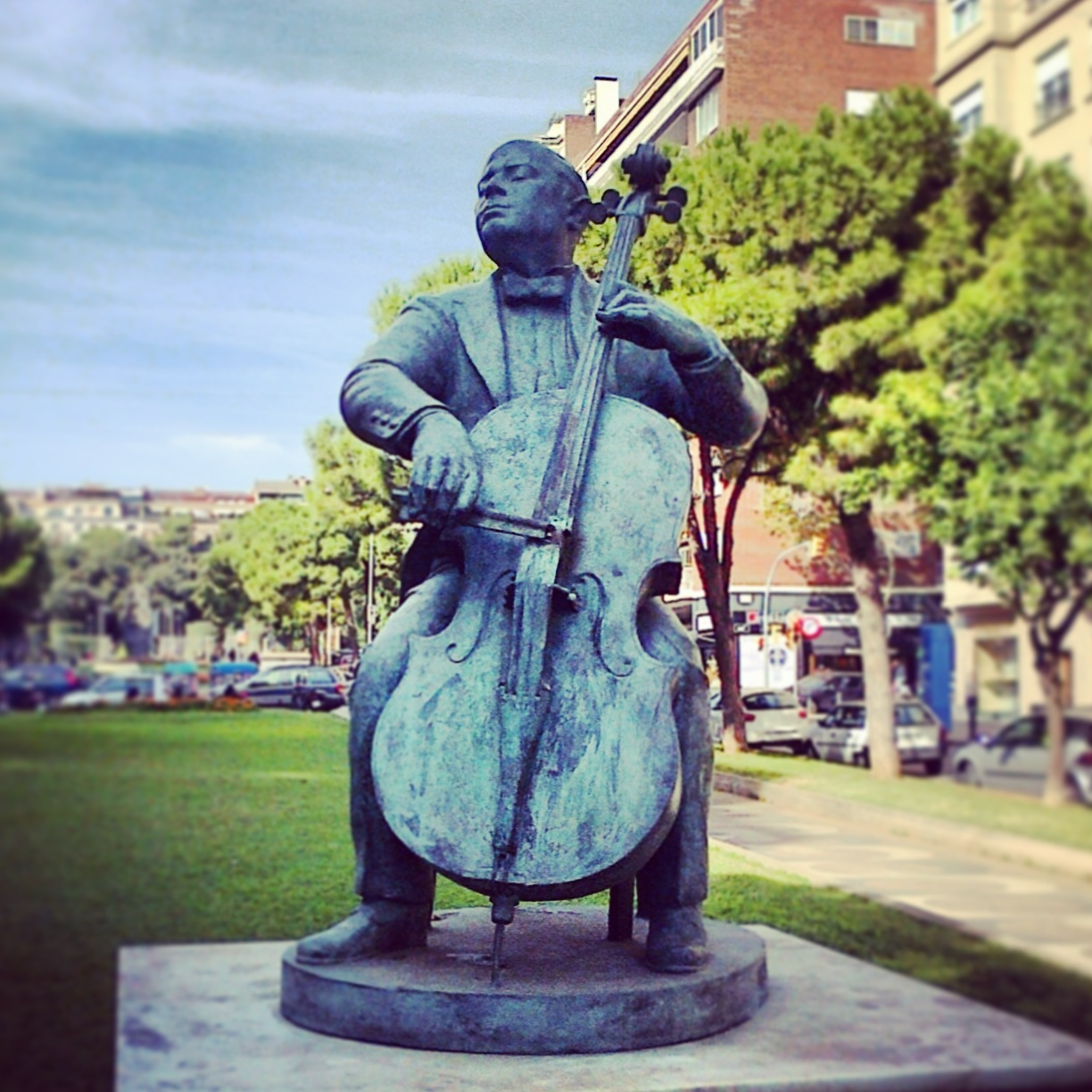
Sculpture of Pablo Casals in Barcelona, made in 1940 by Josep Viladomat i Massanas

After graduating high school, Montañez was awarded a scholarship to attend the Mannes College of Music in New York City to study cello. In 1952, her uncle Rafael took the 15-year-old to the Prades Music Festival. There she first met the noted cellist Pablo Casals (1876–1973), who was very impressed when he heard her play. Casals recommended that she return to New York where he would accept her as a student. She graduated summa cum laude and joined Casals in France where she became an active participant in the Prades Festival.

In 1957, she married the 80-year-old Casals and together they founded the Casals Festival in San Juan, Puerto Rico, and the Puerto Rico Symphony Orchestra. As Co-Chairwoman of the Board and Music Director of the Casals Festival, she became a force for the development of fine music on the island. In 1959, Casals Istomin co-founded the Puerto Rico Conservatory of Music. When her husband died in 1973, she took upon herself the responsibility of running the festival. That same year she established a string instrument program for young children which has produced most of the string players for the Puerto Rico Symphony Orchestra. She also acted as visiting cello professor in the Curtis Institute of Music in Philadelphia, Pennsylvania. Casals Istomin was named Vice-President of the Casals Foundation and Museum in Barcelona, Spain.

== The Kennedy Center's Terrace Concerts ==
Casals Istomin met pianist Eugene Istomin and they were married on February 15, 1975. In 1979, she resigned from her position in the Casals Festival and from 1980 to 1990 served as the artistic director of the John F. Kennedy Center for the Performing Arts in Washington, D.C. During her years as director she founded The Kennedy Center's Terrace Concerts. She also established the largest ballet series in the United States.

From 1990–1997, Casals Istomin was the general director of "Recontres Musicales d'Evian Festival International" in France. As director, she was instrumental in the establishment of master classes with the festival's visiting artists and the expansion of the festival by requiring an inclusion of choral music. This led to the building of a new concert hall.

== Spokeswoman ==
Casals Istomin, who is fluent in English, Spanish, French and Catalan, belongs to or has acted as spokeswoman for the following organizations:

- Member, Board of Trustees, Marlboro School of Music (1973–present)
- Member of the first cultural delegation to the Republic of China (1980)
- Member of the U.S. Advisory on Culture for UNESCO in Mexico City and Paris (1980s)
- Keynote speaker, Chamber Music America Convention in N.Y.C. (1981–84)
- Delegate to the World Arts Forum in Geneva, Switzerland (1989, 1990)
- Member, National Council on the Arts, the advisory council for the National Endowment for the Arts (1991–1997) appointed by President George H. Bush.
- Keynote speaker for International Society of Performing Arts Administrators

== Later years ==
On July 1, 1992, Casals Istomin was named President of the Manhattan School of Music, a position which she held until her retirement in October 2005. In 1998, the National Puerto Rican Day Parade named Casals Istomin the Grand Marshal of the parade. Eugene Istomin died in 2003. Over the years, she has been honored with six honorary doctoral degrees. She has also been decorated with the highest cultural honors by the governments of Puerto Rico, Spain, France and Germany. Casals Istomin currently is a member of the Manhattan School of Music's board of directors. She is also a member of the Artistic Council of the Kronberg Academy. She received on November 2, 2015, the Living Legend Award from the Library of Congress.
