= Piano Trio No. 1 (Mendelssohn) =

Piano trio by Felix Mendelssohn

Piano Trio in D minor
- No. 1
- by Felix Mendelssohn
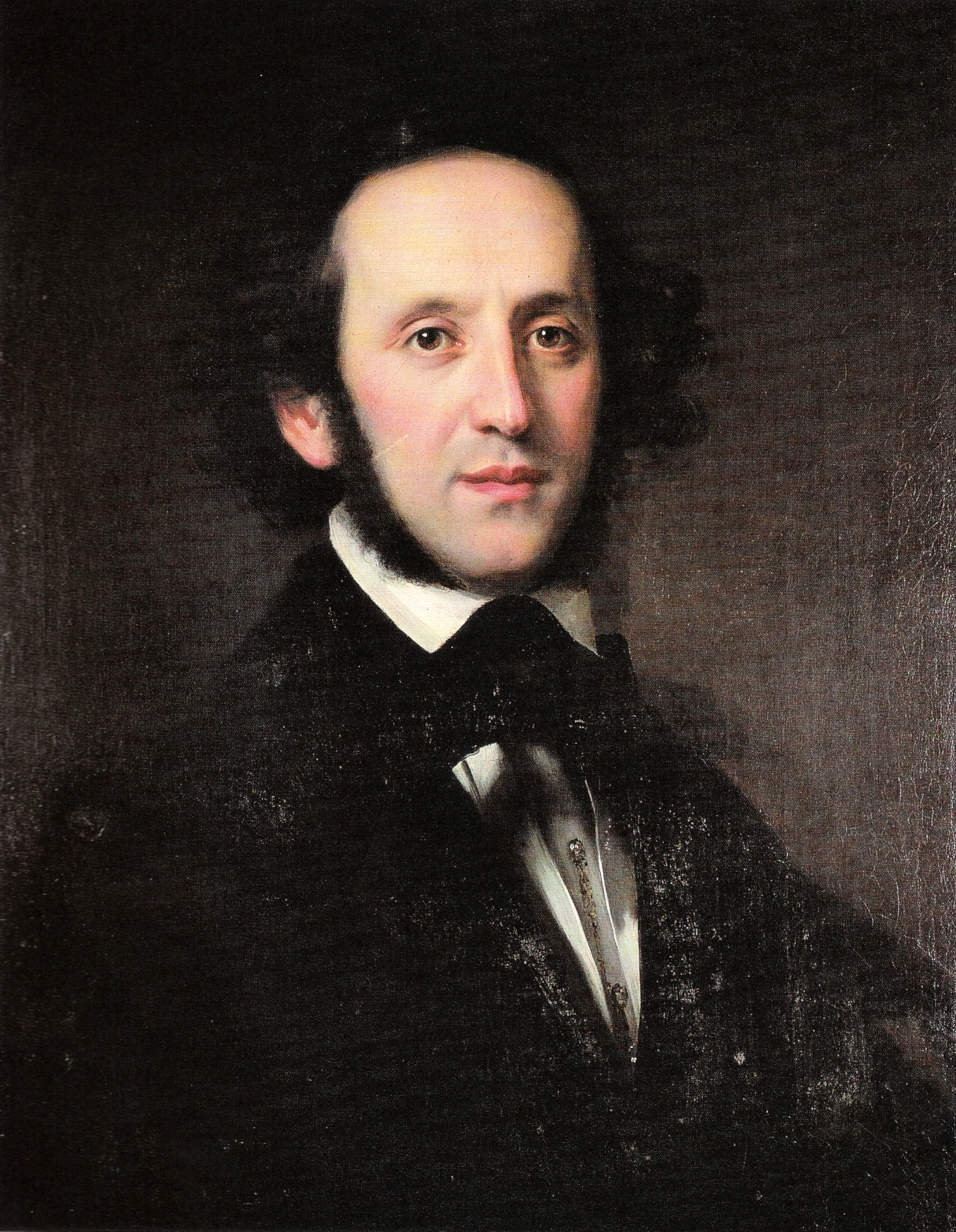
- The composer in 1846
- Key: D minor
- Opus: 49
- Composed: 1839
- Published: 1840
- Movements: four

Felix Mendelssohn's Piano Trio No. 1 in D minor, Op. 49, was completed on 23 September 1839 and published the following year. The work is scored for a standard piano trio consisting of violin, cello and piano. It is one of Mendelssohn's most popular chamber works and is recognized as one of his greatest along with his Octet, Op. 20. During the initial composition of the work, Mendelssohn took the advice of fellow composer Ferdinand Hiller to revise the piano part. Hiller wrote, "with his usual conscientious earnestness when once he had made up his mind, he undertook the length and rewrite the whole pianoforte part."

The revised version was in a more romantic, Schumannesque style with the piano given a more important role in the trio. Indeed, the revised piece was reviewed by Schumann, who declared Mendelssohn to be "the Mozart of the nineteenth century, the brightest musician, who most clearly understands the contradictions of the age and is the first to reconcile them."

== Historical Background ==
On January 21, 1832, while Mendelssohn was in Paris, he wrote a letter to his sister, Fanny Mendelssohn, about writing a work in which the piano takes a more active role in relation to the violin and cello. The trio was premiered on February 1, 1840, at the Leipzig Gewandhaus by violinist Ferdinand David, cellist Franz Karl Witmann, and Mendelssohn at the piano.

Robert Schumann praised the trio as "the master-trio of our time, even as Beethoven's B♭ and D and Schubert's E♭ at their time; it is an exceedingly fine composition that, years hence, will still delight our grandchildren and greatgrandchildren." In 1898, The Musical Times had an interview with the violinist, Joseph Joachim, who recalled the performance in London in 1844, in which the composer was the pianist once again. At the time, only the violinist and cellists had their parts. Mendelssohn said, "never mind, just put a book on the piano and a person can turn from time to time, so I don't need to look as though I played by heart."

== Analysis ==
I. Molto allegro agitato

II. Andante con molto tranquillo

III. Scherzo leggiero e vivace

IV. Finale allegro assai appassionato
Performed by Yu-Ping Tsai (violin), Elisabeth Chang (cello), & Jiahao Han (piano)

=== I. Molto allegro agitato ===
The first movement is in sonata form without an introduction. The exposition has two parts: Part 1 has two large phrases in D minor, begins with a cantabile main theme played by the cello, with the piano providing a syncopated accompaniment, and the violin then joins the cello with a distorted version of the theme. The transition, more variation of the main theme, ends with the minor dominant (v) pedal of the secondary key. Part 2 begins in A major, with a new secondary theme in the cello.

The development stays in a minor till it begins to modulate to B♭ major of the secondary theme, the most magical moment when it shifts to C major. The violin and cello are playing in unison while the piano is doing triplet arpeggios. The recapitulation has two parts as well and it is much shorter. In the first part, it only takes around 43 measures to reach the dominant pedal. The second part, closes with a perfect authentic cadence in d minor and a 38-bars of coda (marked as assai animato).

=== II. Andante con moto tranquillo ===
The piano introduces the second movement, with the eight-bar melody in the right hand and the accompaniment divided between the hands, as in a number of Mendelssohn's Songs without Words. Below this, the bass line in the piano moves methodically, carefully balancing with the accompaniment and the melody. After the piano plays the main theme, the violin repeats it with a counterpoint played on the cello.

=== III. Scherzo. Leggiero e vivace ===
The short and light scherzo is essentially in sonata form. As in the second movement, the main theme is first played on the piano, which then reduces itself to fragmentary accompaniment almost immediately. The rhythmic motif of the main theme is present throughout the movement, except in the more lyrical central section, whose theme resembles material from the first movement.

=== IV. Finale. Allegro assai appassionato ===
After Hiller gave Mendelssohn his advice, the finale was the most revised movement and unsurprisingly has a busy piano part. Various keyboard techniques are called upon in the movement, from close chords to sweeping arpeggios and chromatic octaves. The cantabile moments provide a refreshing contrast. The trio finishes with a shift to D major shortly before the end.
