= Symphony No. 8 (Mahler) =

1910 symphony by Gustav Mahler

- Symphony of a Thousand
- Choral symphony by Gustav Mahler
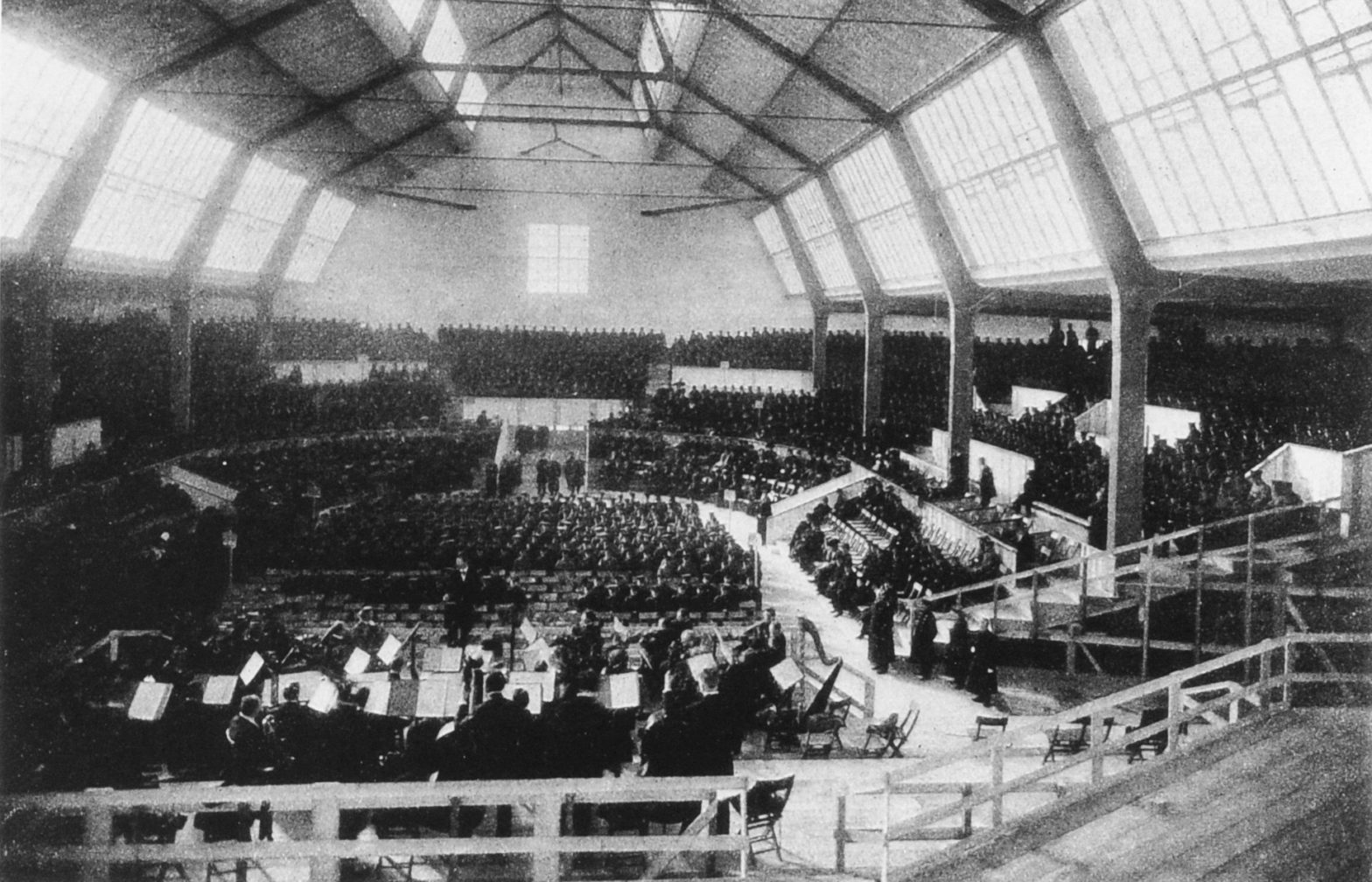
- Final rehearsal for the world premiere in the Neue Musik-Festhalle in Munich
- Key: E♭ major
- Text: Veni creator spiritus; Closing scene of Goethe's Faust
- Language: Latin; German
- Composed: 1906
- Published: 1912
- Movements: 2

Premiere
- Date: 12 September 1910
- Conductor: Gustav Mahler
- Performers: Munich Philharmonic

The Symphony No. 8 in E♭ major by Gustav Mahler is one of the largest-scale choral works in the classical concert repertoire. As it requires huge instrumental and vocal forces it is frequently called the "Symphony of a Thousand", although the work is normally presented with far fewer than a thousand performers and Mahler greatly disapproved of the name. The work was composed in a single inspired burst at his Maiernigg villa in southern Austria in the summer of 1906. The last of Mahler's works that was premiered in his lifetime, the symphony was a critical and popular success when he conducted the Munich Philharmonic in its first performance, in Munich, on 12 September 1910.

The fusion of song and symphony had been a characteristic of Mahler's early works. In his "middle" compositional period after 1901, a change of style led him to produce three purely instrumental symphonies. The Eighth, marking the end of the middle period, returns to a combination of orchestra and voice in a symphonic context. The structure of the work is unconventional: instead of the normal framework of several movements, the piece is in two parts. (Note: "1." and "2. Teil": see primarily Mahler's manuscript (Munich, Baayerische Staatsbibliothek, Mus. ms. 13719, OCLC 756354535), pp. 5 and 79 (of the digital object – the author uses the spelling "Theil") and the first edition (Wien, 1911), pp. 3 and 75; also, the program for the American premiere showed below, §§§1.3.2 Subsequent performances, which lists "Part I" and "Part II".) Part I is based on the Latin text of Veni creator spiritus ("Come, Creator Spirit"), a ninth-century Christian hymn for Pentecost, and Part II is a setting of the words from the closing scene of Goethe's Faust. The two parts are unified by a common idea, that of redemption through the power of love, a unity conveyed through shared musical themes.

Mahler had been convinced from the start of the work's significance; in renouncing the pessimism that had marked much of his music, he offered the Eighth as an expression of confidence in the eternal human spirit. In the period following the composer's death, performances were comparatively rare. However, from the mid-20th century onwards the symphony has been heard regularly in concert halls all over the world, and has been recorded many times. While recognising its wide popularity, modern critics have divided opinions on the work; Theodor W. Adorno, Robert Simpson, and Jonathan Carr found its optimism unconvincing, and considered it artistically and musically inferior to Mahler's other symphonies. Conversely, it has been compared by Deryck Cooke to Ludwig van Beethoven's Symphony No. 9 as a defining human statement for its century.

== History ==
=== Background ===
By the summer of 1906, Mahler had been director of the Vienna Hofoper for nine years. (Note: Mahler had joined the Hofoper as a staff conductor in April 1897, and had succeeded Wilhelm Jahn as director in October of that year.) Throughout this time his practice was to leave Vienna at the close of the Hofoper season for a summer retreat, where he could devote himself to composition. Since 1899 this had been at Maiernigg, near the resort town of Maria Wörth in Carinthia, southern Austria, where Mahler built a villa overlooking the Wörthersee. In these restful surroundings Mahler completed his Symphonies No. 4, No. 5, No. 6 and No. 7, his Rückert songs and his song cycle Kindertotenlieder ("Songs on the Death of Children").

Until 1901, Mahler's compositions had been heavily influenced by the German folk-poem collection Des Knaben Wunderhorn ("The Youth's Magic Horn"), which he had first encountered around 1887. The music of Mahler's many Wunderhorn settings is reflected in his Symphonies No. 2, No. 3 and No. 4, which all employ vocal as well as instrumental forces. From about 1901, however, Mahler's music underwent a change in character as he moved into the middle period of his compositional life. Here, the more austere poems of Friedrich Rückert replace the Wunderhorn collection as the primary influence; the songs are less folk-related, and no longer infiltrate the symphonies as extensively as before. During this period Symphonies No. 5, No. 6 and No. 7 were written, all as purely instrumental works, portrayed by Mahler scholar Deryck Cooke as "more stern and forthright ..., more tautly symphonic, with a new granite-like hardness of orchestration".

Mahler arrived at Maiernigg in June 1906 with the draft manuscript of his Seventh Symphony; he intended to spend time revising the orchestration until an idea for a new work should strike. The composer's wife Alma Mahler, in her memoirs, says that for a fortnight Mahler was "haunted by the spectre of failing inspiration"; Mahler's recollection, however, is that on the first day of the vacation he was seized by the creative spirit, and plunged immediately into composition of the work that would become his Eighth Symphony.

=== Composition ===
Two notes in Mahler's handwriting dating from June 1906 show that early schemes for the work, which he may not at first have intended as a fully choral symphony, were based on a four-movement structure in which two "hymns" surround an instrumental core. These outlines show that Mahler had fixed on the idea of opening with the Latin hymn, but had not yet settled on the precise form of the rest. The first note is as follows:

1. Hymn: Veni creator
2. Scherzo
3. Adagio: Caritas ("Christian love")
4. Hymn: Die Geburt des Eros ("The birth of Eros")

The second note includes musical sketches for the Veni creator movement, and two bars in B minor which are thought to relate to the Caritas. The four-movement plan is retained in a slightly different form, still without specific indication of the extent of the choral element:

1. Veni creator
2. Caritas
3. Weihnachtsspiele mit dem Kindlein ("Christmas games with the child")
4. Schöpfung durch Eros. Hymne ("Creation through Eros. Hymn")

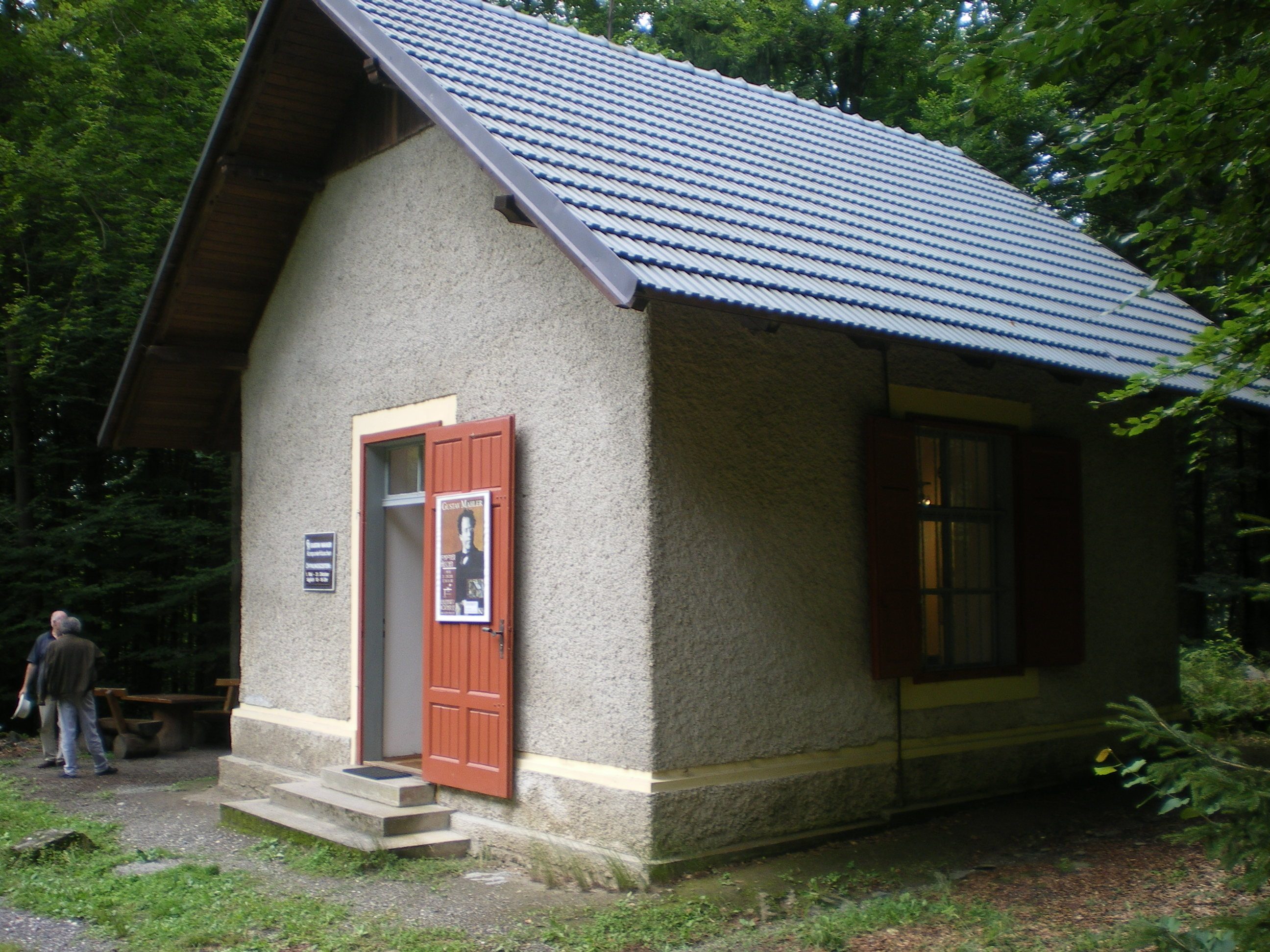
Mahler's composing hut at Maiernigg, where the Eighth Symphony was composed in summer 1906

From Mahler's later comments on the symphony's gestation, it is evident that the four-movement plan was relatively short-lived. He soon replaced the last three movements with a single section, essentially a dramatic cantata, based on the closing scenes of Goethe's Faust, the depiction of an ideal of redemption through eternal womanhood (das Ewige-Weibliche). Mahler had long nurtured an ambition to set the end of the Faust epic to music, "and to set it quite differently from other composers who have made it saccharine and feeble." In comments recorded by his biographer Richard Specht, Mahler makes no mention of the original four-movement plans. He told Specht that having chanced on the Veni creator hymn, he had a sudden vision of the complete work: "I saw the whole piece immediately before my eyes, and only needed to write it down as though it were being dictated to me."

The work was written at a frantic pace—"in record time", according to the musicologist Henry-Louis de La Grange. It was completed in all its essentials by mid-August, even though Mahler had to absent himself for a week to attend the Salzburg Festival. Mahler began composing the Veni creator hymn without waiting for the text to arrive from Vienna. When it did, according to Alma Mahler, "the complete text fitted the music exactly. Intuitively he had composed the music for the full strophes [verses]." (Note: Mitchell adds a caveat to this recollection: as far as he had carried the composition of the hymn at the time when the text arrived. Given the scale of the movement and its complexity, the suggestion that it was composed in its entirety in advance of the words is, in Mitchell's view, impossible to accept.) Although amendments and alterations were subsequently carried out to the score, there is very little manuscript evidence of the sweeping changes and rewriting that occurred with his earlier symphonies as they were prepared for performance.

With its use of vocal elements throughout, rather than in episodes at or near the end, the work was the first completely choral symphony to be written. Mahler had no doubts about the ground-breaking nature of the symphony, calling it the grandest thing he had ever done, and maintaining that all his previous symphonies were merely preludes to it. "Try to imagine the whole universe beginning to ring and resound. There are no longer human voices, but planets and suns revolving." It was his "gift to the nation ... a great joy-bringer."

=== Reception and performance history ===
==== Premiere ====
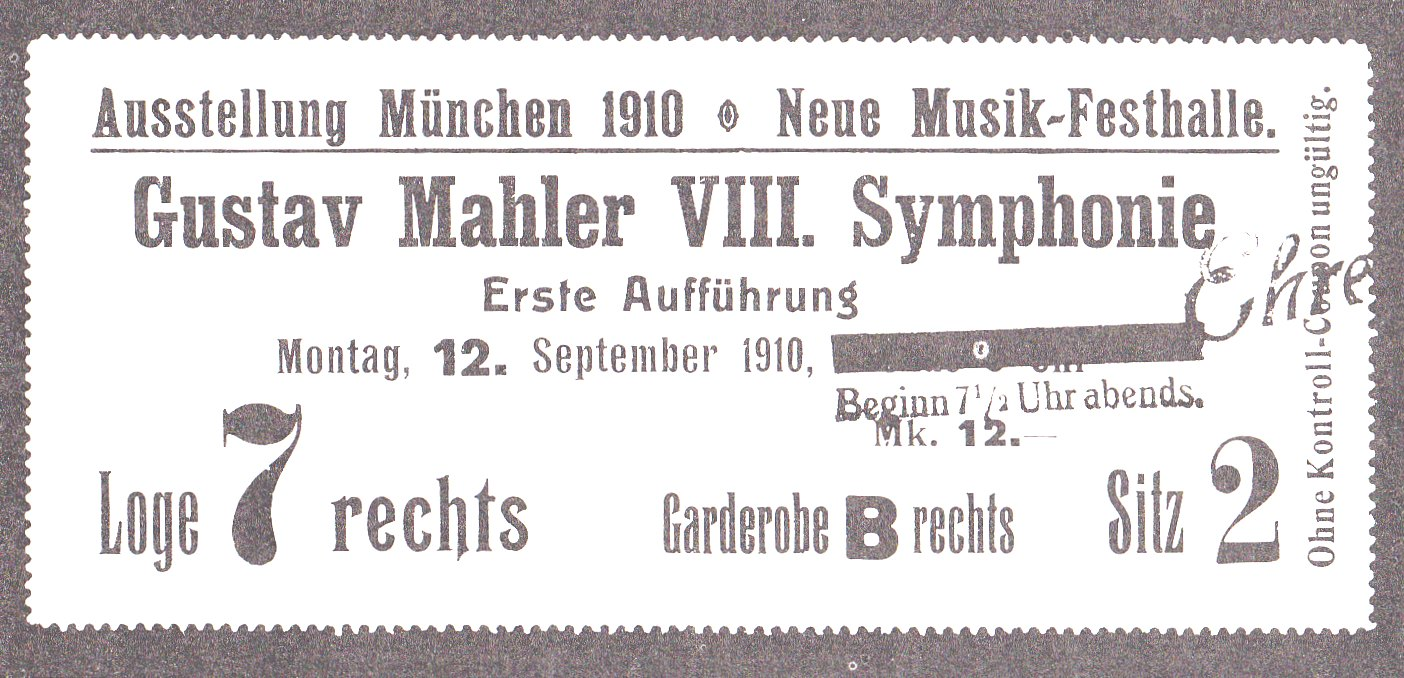
A ticket for the premiere of the Eighth Symphony, Munich, 12 September 1910

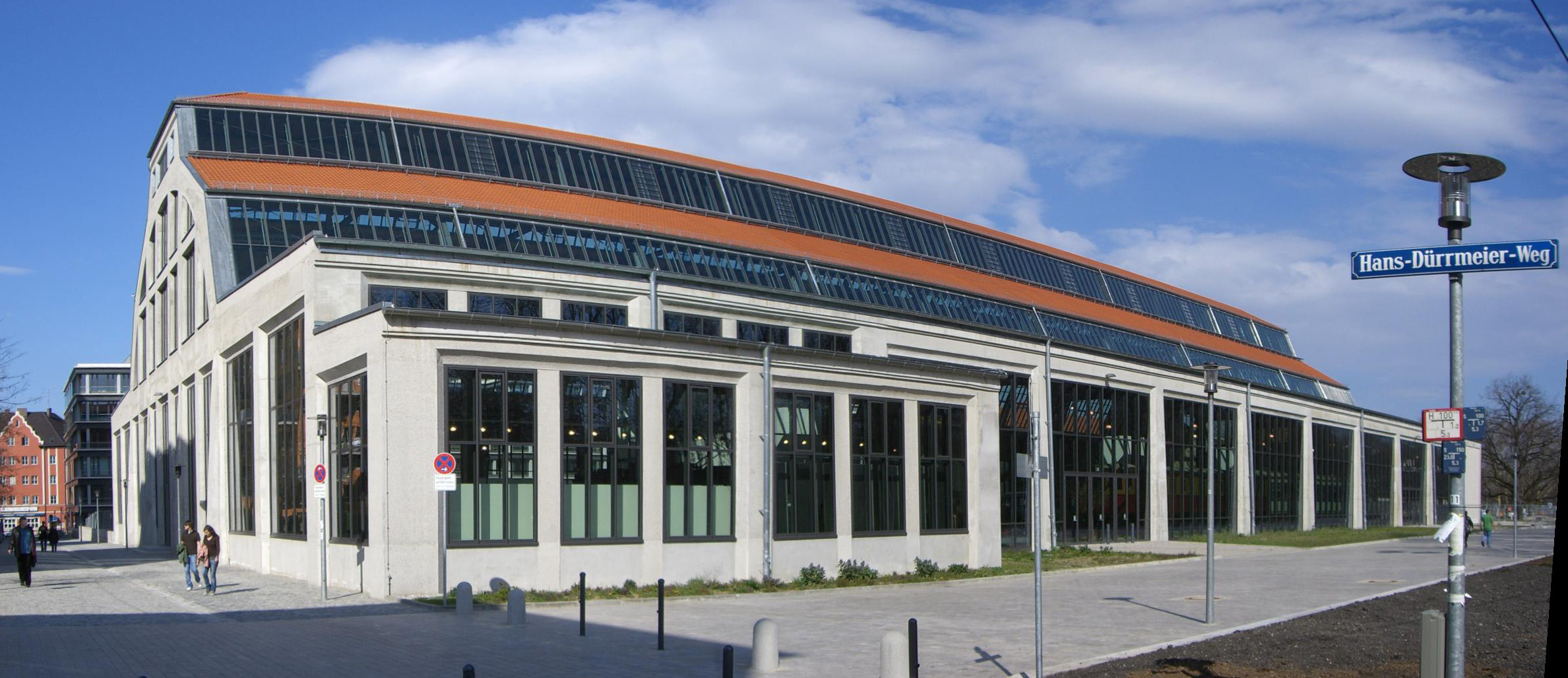
The Neue Musik-Festhalle, venue of the premiere, now part of the transportation centre of the Deutsches Museum

Mahler made arrangements with the impresario Emil Gutmann for the symphony to be premiered in Munich in the autumn of 1910. He soon regretted this involvement, writing of his fears that Gutmann would turn the performance into "a catastrophic Barnum and Bailey show". Preparations began early in the year, with the selection of choirs from the choral societies of Munich, Leipzig and Vienna. The Munich Zentral-Singschule provided 350 students for the children's choir. Meanwhile, Bruno Walter, Mahler's assistant at the Vienna Hofoper, was responsible for the recruitment and preparation of the eight soloists. Through the spring and summer these forces prepared in their home towns, before assembling in Munich early in September for three full days of final rehearsals under Mahler. His youthful assistant Otto Klemperer remarked later on the many small changes that Mahler made to the score during rehearsal: "He always wanted more clarity, more sound, more dynamic contrast. At one point during rehearsals he turned to us and said, 'If, after my death, something doesn't sound right, then change it. You have not only a right but a duty to do so.'"

For the premiere, fixed for 12 September, Gutmann had hired the newly built Neue Musik-Festhalle, in the Munich International Exhibition grounds near Theresienhöhe (now a branch of the Deutsches Museum). This vast hall had a capacity of 3,200; to assist ticket sales and raise publicity, Gutmann devised the nickname "Symphony of a Thousand", which has remained the symphony's popular subtitle despite Mahler's disapproval. (Note: It is not in fact certain that more than 1,000 performers participated in the Munich premiere. La Grange enumerates a chorus of 850 (including 350 children), 157 instrumentalists and the eight soloists, to give a total of 1,015. However, Jonathan Carr suggests that there is evidence that not all the Viennese choristers reached the hall and the number of performers may therefore not have reached 1,000.) Among the many distinguished figures present at the sold-out premiere were the composers Richard Strauss, Camille Saint-Saëns and Anton Webern; the writers Thomas Mann and Arthur Schnitzler; and the leading theatre director of the day, Max Reinhardt. Also in the audience was the 28-year-old British conductor Leopold Stokowski, who six years later would lead the first United States performance of the symphony.

Up to this time, receptions of Mahler's new symphonies had usually been disappointing. However, the Munich premiere of the Eighth Symphony was an unqualified triumph; as the final chords died away there was a short pause before a huge outbreak of applause which lasted for twenty minutes. Back at his hotel Mahler received a letter from Thomas Mann, which referred to the composer as "the man who, as I believe, expresses the art of our time in its profoundest and most sacred form".

The symphony's duration at its first performance was recorded by the critic-composer Julius Korngold as 85 minutes. (Note: The symphony's publishers, Universal Editions, give the duration as 90 minutes, as does Mahler's biographer Kurt Blaukopf. Critic Michael Kennedy, however, estimates "roughly seventy-seven minutes". A typical modern recording, the 1995 Deutsche Grammophon version under Claudio Abbado, plays for 81 minutes 20 seconds.) This performance was the last time that Mahler conducted a premiere of one of his own works. Eight months after his Munich triumph, he died at the age of 50. His remaining works—Das Lied von der Erde ("The Song of the Earth"), his Symphony No. 9 and the unfinished Symphony No. 10—were all premiered after his death.

==== Subsequent performances ====
On the day following the Munich premiere Mahler led the orchestra and choruses in a repeat performance. During the next three years, according to the calculations of Mahler's friend Guido Adler the Eighth Symphony received a further 20 performances across Europe. These included the Dutch premiere, in Amsterdam under Willem Mengelberg on 12 March 1912, and the first Prague performance, given on 20 March 1912 under Mahler's former Vienna Hofoper colleague, Alexander von Zemlinsky. Vienna itself had to wait until 1918 before the symphony was heard there.

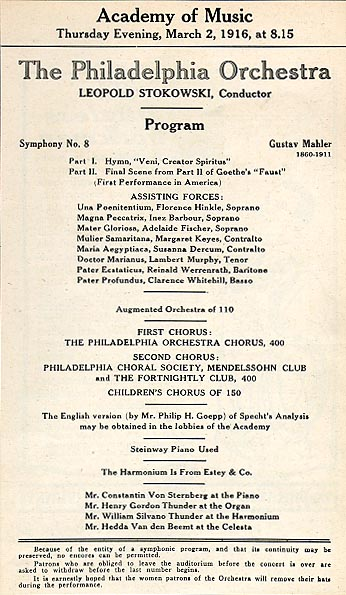
Program for the US premiere of Mahler's Eighth Symphony, Philadelphia, March 1916

In the U.S., Leopold Stokowski persuaded an initially reluctant board of the Philadelphia Orchestra to finance the American premiere, which took place on 2 March 1916. The occasion was a great success; the symphony was played several more times in Philadelphia before the orchestra and choruses travelled to New York, for a series of equally well-received performances at the Metropolitan Opera House.

At the Amsterdam Mahler Festival in May 1920, Mahler's completed symphonies and his major song cycles were presented over nine concerts given by the Concertgebouw Orchestra and choruses, under Mengelberg's direction. The music critic Samuel Langford, who attended the occasion, commented that "we do not leave Amsterdam greatly envying the diet of Mahler first and every other composer afterward, to which Mengelberg is training the music-lovers of that city." The Austrian music historian Oscar Bie, while impressed with the festival as a whole, wrote subsequently that the Eighth was "stronger in effect than in significance, and purer in its voices than in emotion". Langford had commented on the British "not being very eager about Mahler", and the Eighth Symphony was not performed in Britain until 15 April 1930, when Sir Henry Wood presented it with the BBC Symphony Orchestra. The work was played again eight years later by the same forces; among those present in the audience was the youthful composer Benjamin Britten. Impressed by the music, he nevertheless found the performance itself "execrable".

The years after World War II saw a number of notable performances of the Eighth Symphony, including Sir Adrian Boult's broadcast from the Royal Albert Hall on 10 February 1948, the Japanese premiere under Kazuo Yamada in Tokyo in December 1949, and the Australian premiere under Sir Eugene Goossens in 1951. A Carnegie Hall performance under Stokowski in 1950 became the first complete recording of the symphony to be issued. After 1950 the increasing numbers of performances and recordings of the work signified its growing popularity, but not all critics were won over. Theodor W. Adorno found the piece weak, "a giant symbolic shell"; this most affirmative work of Mahler's is, in Adorno's view, his least successful, musically and artistically inferior to his other symphonies. The composer-critic Robert Simpson, usually a champion of Mahler, referred to Part II as "an ocean of shameless kitsch." Mahler biographer Jonathan Carr finds much of the symphony "bland", lacking the tension and resolution present in the composer's other symphonies. Deryck Cooke, on the other hand, compares Mahler's Eighth to Beethoven's Choral (Ninth) Symphony. To Cooke, Mahler's is "the Choral Symphony of the twentieth century: like Beethoven's, but in a different way, it sets before us an ideal [of redemption] which we are as yet far from realising—even perhaps moving away from—but which we can hardly abandon without perishing".

In the late 20th century and into the 21st, the symphony was performed in all parts of the world. A succession of premieres in the Far East culminated in October 2002 in Beijing, when Long Yu led the China Philharmonic Orchestra in the first performance of the work in the People's Republic of China. The Sydney Olympic Arts Festival in August 2000 opened with a performance of the Eighth by the Sydney Symphony Orchestra under its chief conductor Edo de Waart. The popularity of the work, and its heroic scale, meant that it was often used as a set piece on celebratory occasions; on 15 March 2008, Yoav Talmi led 200 instrumentalists and a choir of 800 in a performance in Quebec City, to mark the 400th anniversary of the city's foundation. In London on 16 July 2010 the opening concert of the BBC Proms celebrated the 150th anniversary of Mahler's birth with a performance of the Eighth, with Jiří Bělohlávek conducting the BBC Symphony Orchestra. This performance was its eighth in the history of the Proms.

== Analysis ==
=== Structure and form ===
The Eighth Symphony's two parts combine the sacred text of the 9th-century Latin hymn Veni creator spiritus with the secular text from the closing passages from Goethe's 19th-century dramatic poem Faust. Despite the evident disparities within this juxtaposition, the work as a whole expresses a single idea, that of redemption through the power of love. The choice of these two texts was not arbitrary; Goethe, a poet whom Mahler revered, believed that Veni creator embodied aspects of his own philosophy, and had translated it into German in 1820. Once inspired by the Veni creator idea, Mahler soon saw the Faust poem as an ideal counterpart to the Latin hymn. The unity between the two parts of the symphony is established, musically, by the extent to which they share thematic material. In particular, the first notes of the Veni creator theme —

E♭ → B♭ → A♭:

— dominate the climaxes to each part; at the symphony's culmination, Goethe's glorification of "Eternal Womanhood" is set in the form of a religious chorale.

In composing his score, Mahler temporarily abandoned the more progressive tonal elements which had appeared in his most recent works. The symphony's key is, for Mahler, unusually stable; despite frequent diversions into other keys the music always returns to its central E♭ major. This is the first of his works in which familiar fingerprints—birdsong, military marches, Austrian dances—are almost entirely absent. Although the vast choral and orchestral forces employed suggest a work of monumental sound, according to critic Michael Kennedy "the predominant expression is not of torrents of sound but of the contrasts of subtle tone-colours and the luminous quality of the scoring".

For Part I, most modern commentators accept the sonata-form outline that was discerned by early analysts. The structure of Part II is more difficult to summarise, being an amalgam of many genres. Analysts, including Specht, Cooke and Paul Bekker, have identified Adagio, Scherzo and Finale "movements" within the overall scheme of Part II, though others, including La Grange and Donald Mitchell, find little to sustain this division. The musicologist Ortrun Landmann has suggested that the formal scheme for Part II, after the orchestral introduction, is a sonata plan without the recapitulation, consisting of exposition, development and conclusion.

=== Part I: Veni creator spiritus ===
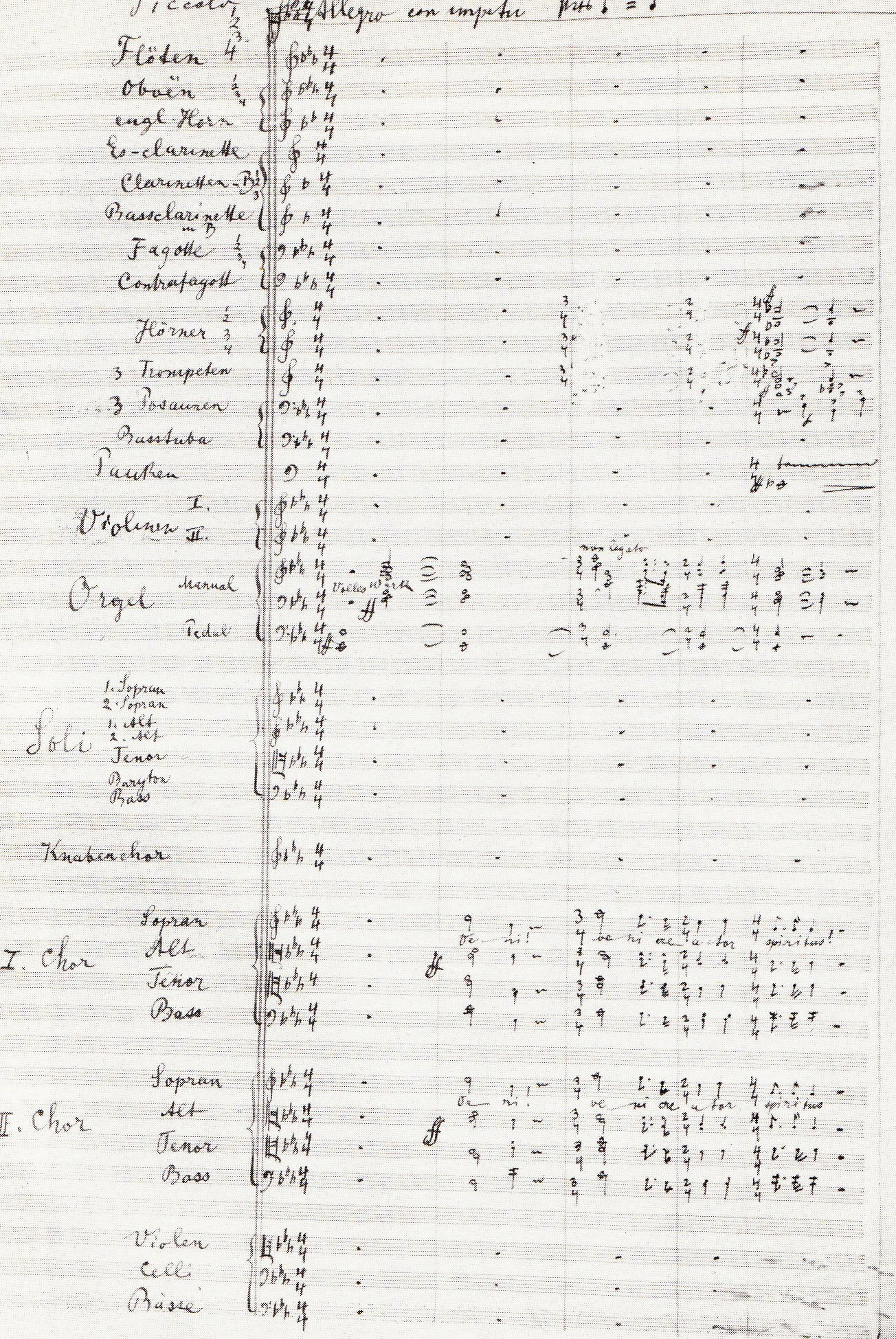
Mahler's fair copy manuscript of the first page of the Eighth Symphony

Mitchell describes Part I as resembling a giant motet, and argues that a key to its understanding is to read it as Mahler's attempt to emulate the polyphony of Bach's great motets, specifically Singet dem Herrn ein neues Lied ("Sing to the Lord a new song"). The symphony begins with a single tonic chord in E♭ major, sounded on the organ, before the entry of the massed choirs in a fortissimo invocation: "Veni, veni creator spiritus". (Note: English quotations from the Veni creator text are taken from the translation in Cooke, pp. 94–95)

The three note "creator" motif is immediately taken up by the trombones and then the trumpets in a marching theme that will be used as a unifying factor throughout the work.

After their first declamatory statement the two choirs engage in a sung dialogue, which ends with a short transition to an extended lyrical passage, the plea "Imple superna gratia" ("Fill with divine grace").

Here, what Kennedy calls "the unmistakable presence of twentieth-century Mahler" is felt as a solo soprano introduces a meditative theme. She is soon joined by other solo voices as the new theme is explored before the choirs return exuberantly, in an A♭ episode in which the soloists compete with the choral masses.

In the next section, "Infirma nostri corporis / virtute firmans perpeti" ("Our weak frames fortify with thine eternal strength"), the tonic key of E♭ major returns with a variation of the opening theme. The section is interrupted by a short orchestral interlude in which the low bells are sounded, adding a sombre touch to the music. This new, less secure mood is carried through when "Infirma nostri corporis" resumes, this time without the choruses, in a subdued D minor echo of the initial invocation.

At the end of this episode another transition precedes the "unforgettable surge in E major", in which the entire body of choral forces declaims "Accende lumen sensibus" ("Illuminate our senses").

The first children's chorus follows, in a joyful mood, as the music gathers force and pace. This is a passage of great complexity, in the form of a double fugue involving development of many of the preceding themes, with constant changes to the key signature. All forces combine again in the recapitulation of the Veni creator section in shortened form. A quieter passage of recapitulation leads to an orchestral coda before the children's chorus announces the doxology Gloria sit Patri Domino ("Glory be to God the Father").

Thereafter the music moves swiftly and powerfully to its climax, in which an offstage brass ensemble bursts forth with the "Accende" theme while the main orchestra and choruses end on a triumphant rising scale.

=== Part II: Closing scene from Goethe's Faust ===
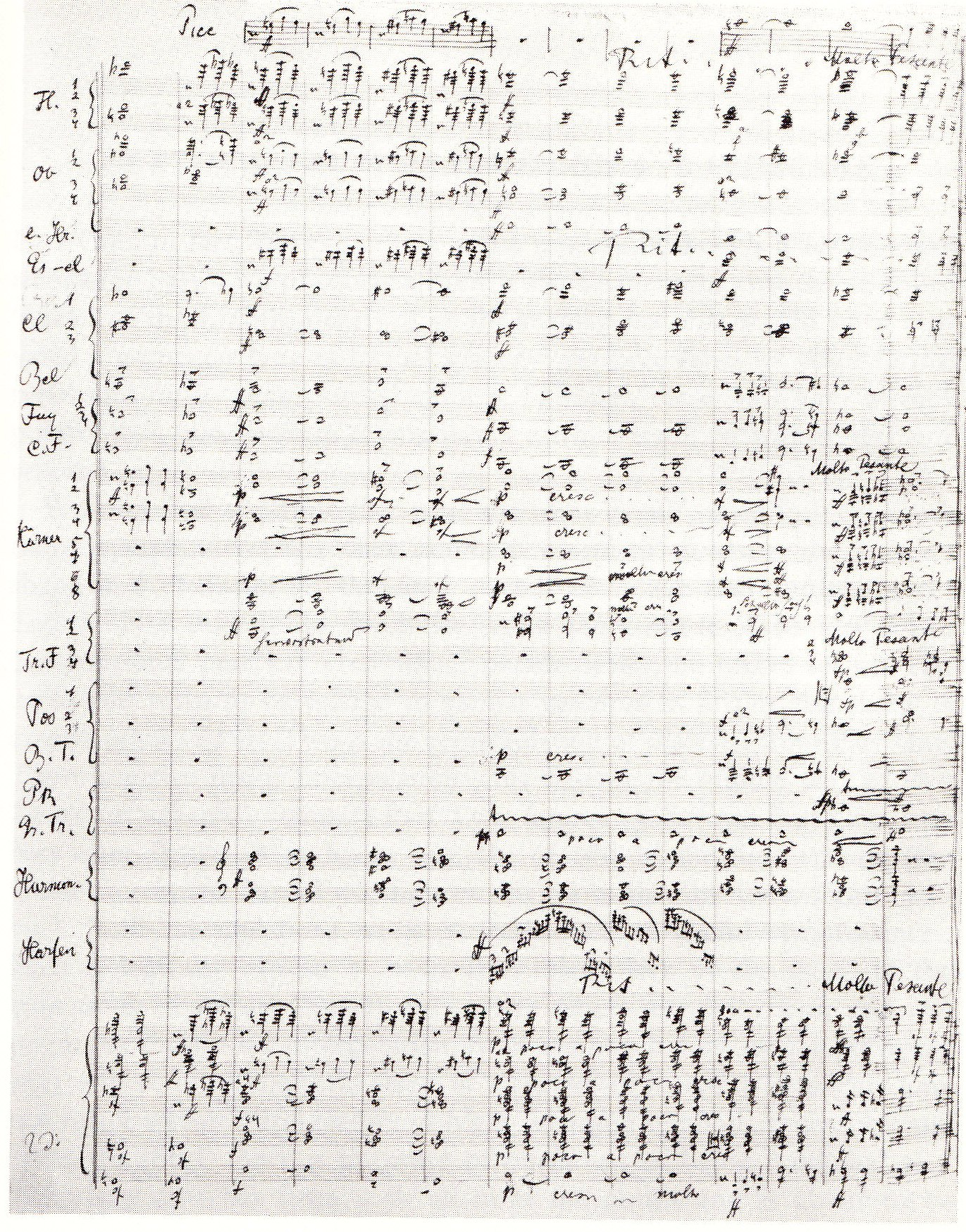
Mahler's manuscript score for the Chorus Mysticus, which provides the triumphant conclusion to the Eighth Symphony

The second part of the symphony follows the narrative of the final stages in Goethe's poem—the journey of Faust's soul, rescued from the clutches of Mephistopheles, on to its final ascent into heaven. Landmann's proposed sonata structure for the movement is based on a division, after an orchestral prelude, into five sections which he identifies musically as an exposition, three development episodes, and a finale.

The long orchestral prelude (166 bars) is in E♭ minor and, in the manner of an operatic overture, anticipates several of the themes which will be heard later in the movement. The exposition begins in near-silence; the scene depicted is that of a rocky, wooded mountainside, the dwelling place of anchorites whose utterances are heard in an atmospheric chorus complete with whispers and echoes.

A solemn baritone solo, the voice of Pater Ecstaticus, ends warmly as the key changes to the major when the trumpets sound the "Accende" theme from Part I. This is followed by a demanding and dramatic aria for bass, the voice of Pater Profundus, who ends his tortured meditation by asking for God's mercy on his thoughts and for enlightenment. The repeated chords in this section are reminiscent of Richard Wagner's Parsifal. The mood lightens with the entry of the angels and blessed boys (women's and children's choruses) bearing the soul of Faust; the music here is perhaps a relic of the "Christmas Games" scherzo envisioned in the abortive four-movement draft plan.

The atmosphere is festive, with triumphant shouts of "Jauchzet auf!" ("Rejoice!") before the exposition ends in a postlude which refers to the "Infirma nostri corporis" music from Part I.

The first phase of development begins as a women's chorus of the younger angels invoke a "happy company of blessed children" (Note: Quotations from the Faust text are based on the translation by David Luke, published in 1994 by Oxford University Press and used in La Grange, pp. 896–904.) who must bear Faust's soul heavenwards. The blessed boys receive the soul gladly; their voices are joined by Doctor Marianus (tenor), who accompanies their chorus before breaking into a rapturous E major paean to the Mater Gloriosa, "Queen and ruler of the world!". As the aria ends, the male voices in the chorus echo the soloist's words to an orchestral background of viola tremolos, in a passage described by La Grange as "emotionally irresistible".

In the second part of the development, the entry of the Mater Gloriosa is signalled in E major by a sustained harmonium chord, with harp arpeggios played over a pianissimo violin melody which La Grange labels the "love" theme.

Thereafter the key changes frequently as a chorus of penitent women petition the Mater for a hearing; this is followed by the solo entreaties of Magna Peccatrix, Mulier Samaritana and Maria Aegyptiaca. In these arias the "love" theme is further explored, and the "scherzo" theme associated with the first appearance of the angels returns. These two motifs predominate in the trio which follows, a request to the Mater on behalf of a fourth penitent, Faust's lover once known as Gretchen, who has come to make her plea for the soul of Faust. After Gretchen's entreaty, a solo of "limpid beauty" in Kennedy's words, an atmosphere of hushed reverence descends. The Mater Gloriosa then sings her only two lines, in the symphony's opening key of E♭ major, permitting Gretchen to lead the soul of Faust into heaven.

The final development episode is a hymnlike tenor solo and chorus, in which Doctor Marianus calls on the penitents to "Gaze aloft".

A short orchestral passage follows, scored for an eccentric chamber group consisting of piccolo, flute, clarinet, harmonium, celesta, piano, harps and a string quartet. This acts as a transition to the finale, the Chorus Mysticus, which begins in E♭ major almost imperceptibly—Mahler's notation here is Wie ein Hauch, "like a breath".

The sound rises in a gradual crescendo, as the solo voices alternately join or contrast with the chorus. As the climax approaches, many themes are reprised: the love theme, Gretchen's song, the "Accende" from Part I. Finally, as the chorus concludes with "The eternal feminine draws us on high", the off-stage brass re-enters with a final salute on the Veni creator motif, to end the symphony with a triumphant flourish.

== Instrumentation ==
=== Orchestra ===
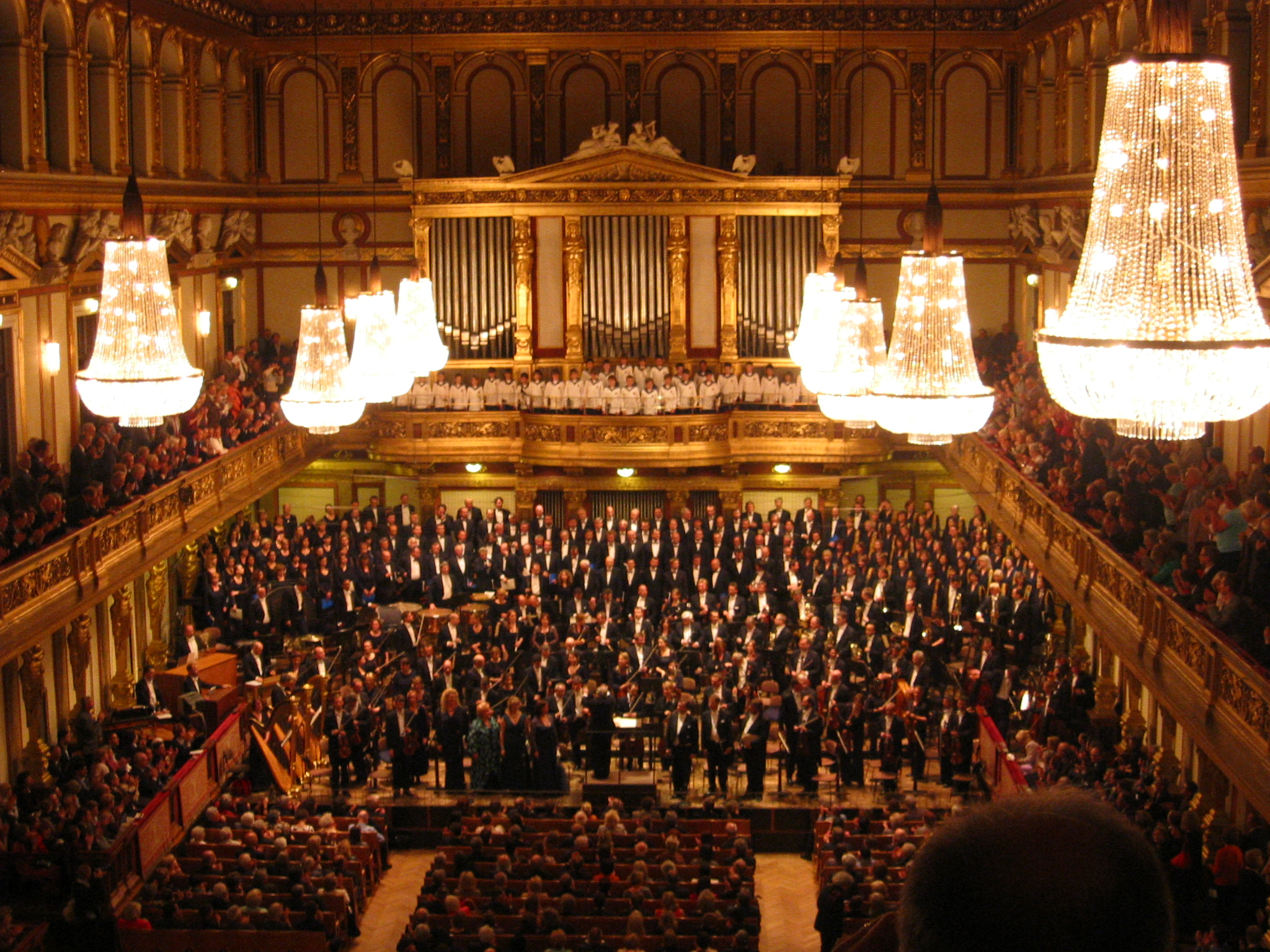
A performance of Mahler's Eighth in Vienna in 2009 illustrates the scale of the instrumental and vocal forces employed.

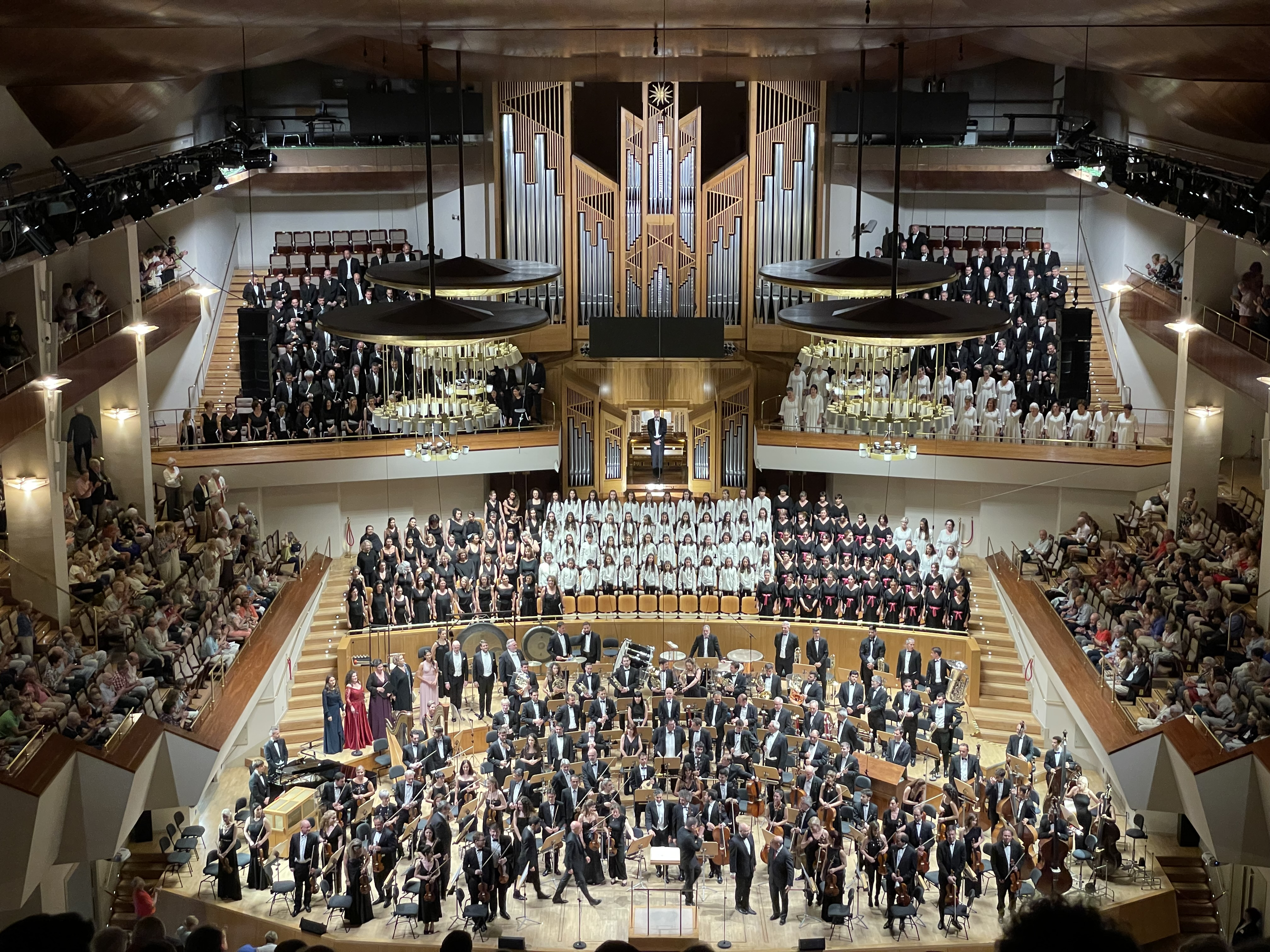
The performance at the Auditorio Nacional de España in 2023 with the Spanish National Orchestra and five choral ensembles

The symphony is scored for a very large orchestra, in keeping with Mahler's conception of the work as a "new symphonic universe", a synthesis of symphony, cantata, oratorio, motet, and lied in a combination of styles. La Grange comments: "To give expression to his cosmic vision, it was ... necessary to go beyond all previously known limits and dimensions." The orchestral forces required are, however, not as large as those deployed in Arnold Schoenberg's oratorio Gurre-Lieder, completed in 1911. The orchestra consists of:

- Woodwinds
  - 2 piccolos (1st doubling 5th flute)
  - 4 flutes
  - 4 oboes
  - cor anglais
  - 3 B♭ clarinets
  - E♭ clarinet
  - bass clarinet
  - 4 bassoons
  - contrabassoon
- Brass
  - 8 horns
  - 8 trumpets (four offstage)
  - 7 trombones (three offstage)
  - tuba
- Percussion
  - 4 timpani
  - bass drum
  - cymbals
  - triangle
  - tam-tam
  - 2 tuned bells in A and A♭
  - glockenspiel (used only in part II)
- Keyboards
  - organ
  - celesta (used only in part II)
  - piano (used only in part II)
  - harmonium (used only in part II)
- Strings
  - mandolin (used only in part II)
  - 2 harps (sometimes 4) (used only in part II)
  - 1st violins
  - 2nd violins
  - violas
  - cellos
  - double basses

Mahler recommended that in very large halls, the first player in each of the woodwind sections should be doubled and that numbers in the strings should also be augmented. In addition, the piccolos, E♭ clarinet, harps and mandolin, and the first offstage trumpet, should have "several to the part" ("mehrfach besetzt").

=== Choral and vocal forces ===
- 3 soprano solos (3rd used only in part II)
- 2 alto solos
- tenor solo
- baritone solo
- bass solo
- 2 SATB choirs
- children's choir

In Part II the soloists are assigned to dramatic roles represented in Goethe's text, as illustrated in the following table.

Voice type	Role	Premiere soloists, 12 September 1910
First soprano	Magna Peccatrix (a sinful woman)	Gertrude Förstel (Vienna Opera)
Second soprano	Una poenitentium (a penitent formerly known as Gretchen)	Martha Winternitz-Dorda (Hamburg Opera)
Third soprano	Mater Gloriosa (the Virgin Mary)	Emma Bellwidt (Frankfurt)
First alto	Mulier Samaritana (a Samaritan woman)	Ottilie Metzger (Hamburg Opera)
Second alto	Maria Aegyptiaca (Mary of Egypt)	Anna Erler-Schnaudt (Munich)
Tenor	Doctor Marianus	Felix Senius (Berlin)
Baritone	Pater Ecstaticus	Nicola Geisse-Winkel (Wiesbaden Opera)
Bass	Pater Profundus	Richard Mayr (Vienna Opera)

La Grange draws attention to the notably high tessitura for the sopranos, for soloists and for choral singers. He characterises the alto solos as brief and unremarkable; however, the tenor solo role in Part II is both extensive and demanding, requiring on several occasions to be heard over the choruses. The wide melodic leaps in the Pater Profundus role present particular challenges to the bass soloist.

== Publication ==
Only one autograph score of Symphony No. 8 is known to exist. Once the property of Alma Mahler, it is held by the Bayerische Staatsbibliothek in Munich. In 1906 Mahler signed a contract with the Viennese publishing firm Universal Edition (UE), which thus became the main publisher of all his works. The full orchestral score of the Symphony was published by UE in 1912. A Russian version, published in Moscow by Izdatel'stvo Muzyka in 1976, was republished in the United States by Dover Publications in 1989, with an English text and notes. The International Gustav Mahler Society, founded in 1955, has as its main objective the production of a complete critical edition of all of Mahler's works. As of 2016 its critical edition of the Eighth remains a project for the future.

== Recordings ==
Sir Adrian Boult's 1948 broadcast performance with the BBC Symphony Orchestra was recorded by the BBC, but not issued until 2009 when it was made available in MP3 form. The first commercially issued recording of the complete symphony was performed by the Rotterdam Philharmonic Orchestra conducted by Eduard Flipse. It was recorded live by Philips at the 1954 Holland Festival. In 1962, the New York Philharmonic conducted by Leonard Bernstein made the first stereo recording of Part I for Columbia Records. This was followed in 1964 by the first stereo recording of the complete symphony, performed by the Utah Symphony conducted by Maurice Abravanel.

Since the symphony was first recorded, at least 70 recordings have been made by many of the world's leading orchestras and singers, mostly during live performances.

== Notes and references ==
=== Sources ===
- Anderson, Colin (2009). "Sir Adrian Boult: Mahler's Symphony No. 8" (PDF). Music Preserved. Archived from the original (PDF) on 3 June 2016.
- Blaukopf, Kurt (1974). Gustav Mahler. Harmondsworth, UK: Futura Publications. ISBN 978-0-86007-034-4.
- Carr, Jonathan (1998). Mahler: A Biography. Woodstock, New York: The Overlook Press. ISBN 978-0-87951-802-8.
- Cooke, Deryck (1980). Gustav Mahler: An Introduction to his Music. London: Faber Music. ISBN 978-0-571-10087-3.
- Franklin, Peter. "Mahler, Gustav". In Macy, Laura (ed.). Oxford Music Online. (subscription required)
- Gibbs, Christopher H. (2010). "Mahler Symphony No. 8, "Symphony of a Thousand"". Carnegie Hall. Archived from the original on 23 March 2016.
- "Gustav Mahler 8 Symphonie". Universal Edition.
- "Gustav Mahler: Eighth Symphony: Part One". British Broadcasting Corporation (BBC).
- "Gustav Mahler: Works". Gustav Mahler 2010. Archived from the original on 21 March 2008.
- Heyworth, Peter (1994). Otto Klemperer, His Life and Times, Volume 1 1885–1933. Cambridge, UK: Cambridge University Press. ISBN 978-0-521-24293-6.
- Hoechst, Coit Roscoe (1916). Faust in Music. Pittsburgh: University of Pittsburgh.
- Kennedy, Michael (1990). Mahler. Oxford, UK: Oxford University Press. ISBN 978-0-460-12598-7. OL 269240W.
- La Grange, Henry-Louis (2000). Gustav Mahler Volume 3: Vienna: Triumph and Disillusion (1904–1907). Oxford, UK: Oxford University Press. ISBN 978-0-19-315160-4.
- Langford, Samuel (1 July 1920). "The Mahler Festival in Amsterdam". The Musical Times. 61 (929): 448–450. doi:10.2307/908774. JSTOR 908774. (subscription required)
- "Long Yu, Artistic Director and Principal Conductor". The Chinese Embassy, Poland. 2004.
- Mahler, Alma (1968). Gustav Mahler: Memories and letters. London: John Murray.
- Mitchell, Donald (1975). Gustav Mahler Volume II: The Wunderhorn Years: Chronicles and Commentaries. London: Faber and Faber. ISBN 978-0-571-10674-5.
- Mitchell, Donald (1985). Gustav Mahler Volume III: Songs and Symphonies of Life and Death: Interpretations and Annotations. London: Faber and Faber. ISBN 978-0-571-13634-6.
- Mitchell, Donald (1980). Sadie, Stanley (ed.). New Grove Dictionary of Music and Musicians Volume 11. London: Macmillan. pp. 505–529. ISBN 978-0-333-23111-1.
- Mitchell, Donald (1995). The Creating of the Eighth (in booklet accompanying DGG recording 445 843-2). Hamburg: Deutsche Grammophon.
- Seckerson, Edward (April 2005). "Mahler: Symphony No. 8". Gramophone. London. p. 93.
- Painter, Karen, ed. (2002). Mahler and His World. Princeton, New Jersey: Princeton University Press. ISBN 978-0-691-09244-7.
- "Symphonie No 8 en Mi bémol majeur: Chronologie; Discographie: Commentaires" (in French). gustavmahler.net.
- Wildhagen, Christian (2000). Die Achte Symphonie von Gustav Mahler. Konzeption einer universalen Symphonik. Frankfurt am Main, Berlin, Bern, Bruxelles, New York, Oxford, Wien: Lang. ISBN 978-3-631-35606-7.
