= Ottenberg (surname) =

Ottenberg is a surname. Notable people with the surname include:

- Hans-Günter Ottenberg (born 1947), German musicologist and teacher
- Mel Ottenberg, American fashion designer
- Nettie Ottenberg (1887–1922), Russian-born American social worker and advocate for women's suffrage
- Miriam Ottenberg (1914–1982), American journalist
- Reuben Ottenberg (1882–1959), American physician and haematologist
