= Annegret Rosenmüller =

German musicologist (born 1967)

Annegret Rosenmüller (born 31 August 1967) is a German musicologist.

== Life ==
Born in Neubrandenburg, Rosenmüller studied musicology, and art history at the University of Leipzig from 1989 to 1994. From 1995 to 2000, she continued her studies at the Technical University of Dresden and received her doctorate in 2000 under Hans-Günter Ottenberg.

This was followed by positions at the Saxon Academy of Sciences and Humanities in Leipzig, at the Mitteldeutscher Rundfunk, at the University of Music and Theatre Leipzig, at the Bach Archive, at the Stadtgeschichtliches Museum Leipzig, at the Leipzig University Library and at the Leipzig office of the Répertoire International des Sources Musicales.

Since April 2010, Rosenmüller has been a research associate at the Schumann-Briefedition of the Saxon Academy of Sciences.

== Publications ==
=== Monographs ===
- Carl Ferdinand Becker (1804–1877). Studien zu Leben und Werk (Musikstadt Leipzig, volume 4), Hamburg: Bockel 2000; ISBN 978-3932696190
- Die Überlieferung der Clavierkonzerte in der Königlichen Privatmusikaliensammlung zu Dresden im letzten Drittel des 18. Jahrhunderts (Schriften zur Mitteldeutschen Musikgeschichte, volume 5), Eisenach: Verlag Karl Dieter Wagner 2002 (Diss.); ISBN 978-3889790941 (Google Books)
- Der Bestand N.I. (Neues Inventar) in den Sondersammlungen der Universitätsbibliothek Leipzig. Thematischer Katalog (Musikhandschriften in Deutschland. Kataloge ausgewählter Sammlungen, volume 4), Munich and Frankfurt, 2011; (online)
- Briefwechsel Clara Schumanns mit Mathilde Wendt und Malwine Jungius sowie Gustav Wendt. (Schumann Briefedition, series II: Freundes- und Künstlerbriefwechsel, volume 14), edited by Annegret Rosenmüller, Cologne 2011
- Briefwechsel Robert und Clara Schumanns mit Eduard Bendemann, Julius Hübner, Johann Peter Lyser und anderen Dresdner Künstlern (Schumann Briefedition, series II: Freundes- und Künstlerbriefwechsel, Band 6), edited by Renate Brunner, Michael Heinemann, Irmgard Knechtges-Obrecht, Klaus Martin Kopitz and Annegret Rosenmüller, Cologne 2014
- Briefwechsel Clara Schumanns mit Landgräfin Princess Anna of Prussia, Marie von Oriola und anderen Angehörigen deutscher Adelshäuser (Schumann Briefedition, series II: Freundes- und Künstlerbriefwechsel, volume 12), edited by Annegret Rosenmüller, Cologne 2015
- Briefwechsel Robert und Clara Schumanns mit den Familien Voigt, Preußer, Herzogenberg und anderen Korrespondenten in Leipzig (Schumann Briefedition, series II: Freundes- und Künstlerbriefwechsel, vol. 15), edited by Annegret Rosenmüller und Ekaterina Smyka, Cologne 2016
- Briefwechsel Robert und Clara Schumanns mit Korrespondenten in Leipzig 1828 bis 1878.(Schumann Briefedition, series II: Freundes- und Künstlerbriefwechsel, volume 19), edited by Annegret Rosenmüller and Ekaterina Smyka, Cologne 2018

=== Articles ===
- Carl Ferdinand Becker (1804–1877) und sein Wirken für die Musik des 16. und 17. Jahrhunderts, in Basler Jahrbuch für historische Musikpraxis, vol. 21, 1997, pp. 159–179
- Naumann und Leipzig – eine Spurensuche. Quellen und Rezeption, in Johann Gottlieb Naumann und die europäische Musikkultur des ausgehenden 18. Jahrhunderts. Bericht über das Internationale Symposium vom 8. bis 10. Juni 2001 im Rahmen der Dresdner Musikfestspiele 2001, edited by Ortrun Landmann und Hans-Günter Ottenberg, Hildesheim, Zürich und New York 2006, pp. 365–398
- „Nichts ... als die Edle Music“. Musikstadt Leipzig (16.–18. Jahrhundert), in Leipzig original. Stadtgeschichte vom Mittelalter bis zur Völkerschlacht. Katalog zur Dauerausstellung des Stadtgeschichtlichen Museums Leipzig im Alten Rathaus, part I, edited by Volker Rodekamp, Altenburg 2006, pp. 244–255
- Der Beginn der modernen Musikwissenschaft in Leipzig, in Ein Kosmos des Wissens. Weltschrifterbe in Leipzig (Ausstellungskatalog), Leipzig 2009, pp. 136–146
- Sammlungen und Nachlässe mit Musikhandschriften und Musikerbriefen in den Sondersammlungen der Universitätsbibliothek Leipzig, in 600 Jahre Musik an der Universität Leipzig, edited by Eszter Fontana, Wettin 2010, pp. 398–411
- Carl Ferdinand Becker und die Organistenausbildung am Leipziger Konservatorium, in „Diess herrliche, imponirende Instrument“. Die Orgel im Zeitalter Felix Mendelssohn Bartholdys, edited by Anselm Hartinger, Christoph Wolff and Peter Wollny (Beiträge zur Geschichte der Bach-Rezeption, vol. 3), Wiesbaden 2011, pp. 285–302
- „ … daß ich so recht das Gefühl des Vertrauens empfinde, wenn ich Ihnen schreibe, wie es nun eben vom Herzen kommt!“ Zum Briefwechsel von Clara Schumann mit Mathilde Wendt, in Denkströme. Journal der Sächsischen Akademie der Wissenschaften zu Leipzig, August 2012 issue, pp. 151–170 (online)
- Aufführungen von Instrumentalmusik in Dresden von 1765 bis 1810. Beitrag zu einer Chronologie, in Partita. Siebenundzwanzig Sätze zur Dresdner Musikgeschichte. Festschrift für Hans-Günter Ottenberg zum 65. Geburtstag, edited by Wolfgang Mende, Dresden 2012, pp. 503–533

=== Sheet music editions ===
- Johann Georg Neruda, Sei Sonate a tre für Violino I, Violino II und Basso continuo (Instrumentalmusik am Dresdner Hof, volume2), Beeskow 2006
- Giuseppe Valentini, Concerto für Oboe, Violine, Streicher und Basso continuo (Instrumentalmusik am Dresdner Hof, volume 8), Beeskow 2006
- Christlieb Siegmund Binder, Concerto e-Moll für Cembalo und Streicher (Instrumentalmusik am Dresdner Hof, volume 9), Beeskow 2008
- Georg Friedrich Händel, Acis und Galatea (in der Bearbeitung von Felix Mendelssohn Bartholdy), Stuttgart 2008
- Antonio Caldara, Motetti a due o tre voci, Op. 4 (Musik aus der Dresdner Hofkirche, volume 7), Beeskow 2011
