= Piano Sonata in G minor =

Piano Sonata in G minor may refer to:

- Piano Sonata No. 19 (Beethoven)
- Piano Sonata No. 2 (Schumann)
