= Miriam Ottenberg =

American journalist

Miriam Ottenberg (October 7, 1914 in Washington, D.C. – November 10, 1982) was the first woman news reporter for The Washington Star who won a Pulitzer Prize in 1960, for a series of articles exposing the practices of unscrupulous used car dealers in Washington D.C.

== Background ==
Her father was Louis Ottenberg, a lawyer for 45 years in the District of Columbia, at whose suggestion the American Bar Association created the Magna Carta Memorial in Runnymede, England. Her mother was Nettie (Podell) Ottenberg, one of the first training social workers in the United States who won the first federal funding for day care.

== Career ==
Ottenberg's follow-up stories led to enactment of remedial law.

With several honors and awards given during her career, Ottenberg also was one of the first reporters to reveal that the Mafia was an organized crime network. She once summed up her feelings about her role as a journalist: "A reporter should expose the bad and campaign for the good. That's the way I was brought up."

Ottenberg appeared on the CBS television program, I've Got a Secret, on the May 4, 1960 episode. Her secret was “We all won Pulitzer Prizes this week.”

== Awards and recognition ==
- Co-winner of the Washington Newspaper Guild competition for public service articles in 1953
- Honorable mention awards in the same category in 1954 and 1958, and in 1959
- Pulitzer Prize in 1960 for best investigation report: "Buyer Beware"
- Bill Pryor Award of the Washington Newspaper Guild for her series on used car fraud, "Buyer Beware"
- First place in the local news category for her stories on an abortion ring and on murders of women
- In May 1958, capital police, jurists, and local and federal government officials held a party to pay tribute to Ottenberg's efforts against crime
- She was given awards for distinction by the National Council of Jewish Women in 1963 and by the American Association of University Women in 1975
- In 1979 she won the Hope Chest Award from the National Capital Chapter of the National MS Society

== Works ==
Ottenberg published the following books:

- The Warren Commission Report: The Assassination of President Kennedy Miriam Ottenberg
- The Pursuit of Hope Ottenberg, Miriam ISBN 9780892560691
- The Federal Prosecutors (Prentice-Hall), a book about the FBI (1962)
