= Kurt Blaukopf =

Austrian music sociologist

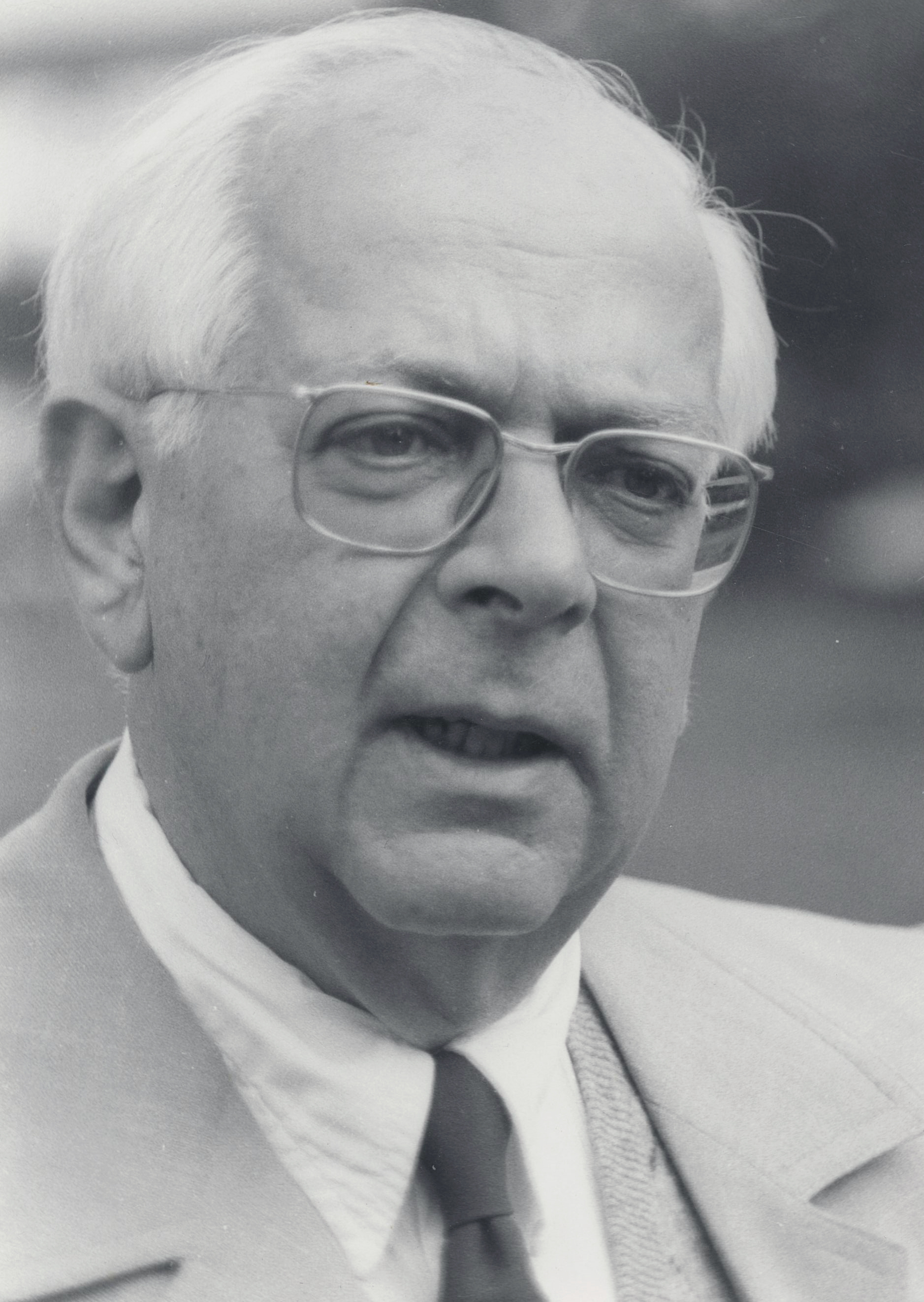
Kurt Blaukopf in 1980

Kurt Blaukopf (15 February 1914 – 14 June 1999) was an Austrian music sociologist. Blaukopf established music sociology as a subject at the Vienna Musikhochschule. He founded the Institute of Music Sociology and the MEDIACULT Institute.

== Life and career ==
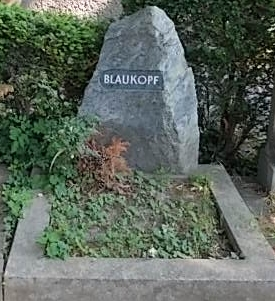
Grave of Kurt and Herta Blaukopf, Vienna

Blaukopf was born in Czernowitz (then Austria-Hungary, now Ukraine), but the family soon left Bukovina for Vienna where he studied law and political science. After the Anschluss in 1938, he had to leave Austria and continued to work in Paris, and in 1940 he moved to Jerusalem. Blaukopf never completed his studies, and he worked as a freelance musicologist and music critic since 1947. From 1962 until his retirement in 1984, he first lectured at the Academy of Music and Performing Arts in Vienna where he became an honorary professor in 1974 and Austria's first and only full professor of music sociology in 1977. In 1994 Blaukopf was awarded an honorary doctorate by the University of Vienna. Blaukopf initiated the founding of the MEDIACULT Institute (International Research Institute for Media, Communication and Cultural Development) and was its director until 1985. Blaukopf was also a member of the Executive Council of UNESCO from 1972 to 1976. His best-known work is "Musik im Wandel der Gesellschaft" (Musical Life in a Changing Society), published in 1982 and expanded in 1996, which provides a comprehensive overview of his conception of music sociology.

Kurt Blaukopf was in contact with numerous influential intellectuals of the pre-war and post-war periods, such as Hanns Eisler, Theodor W. Adorno and Karl Popper.

He was married to the Mahler researcher Herta Blaukopf (née Singer), with whom he co-published several works.

== Selected bibliography ==
- Musical Life in a Changing Society: Aspects of Musical Sociology. Amadeus Press, 2003
- Mahler: His Life, Work and World; (with Herta Blaukopf). London: Thames & Hudson, 1992
- Mahler: A Documentary Study. London: Thames & Hudson, 1976.
- Gustav Mahler. London: Allen Lane, 1973.
- Gustav Mahler oder der Zeitgenosse der Zukunft. Verlag Fritz Molden, Vienna 1969
