= Piano Sonata No. 2 (Schumann) =

Composition for piano by Robert Schumann

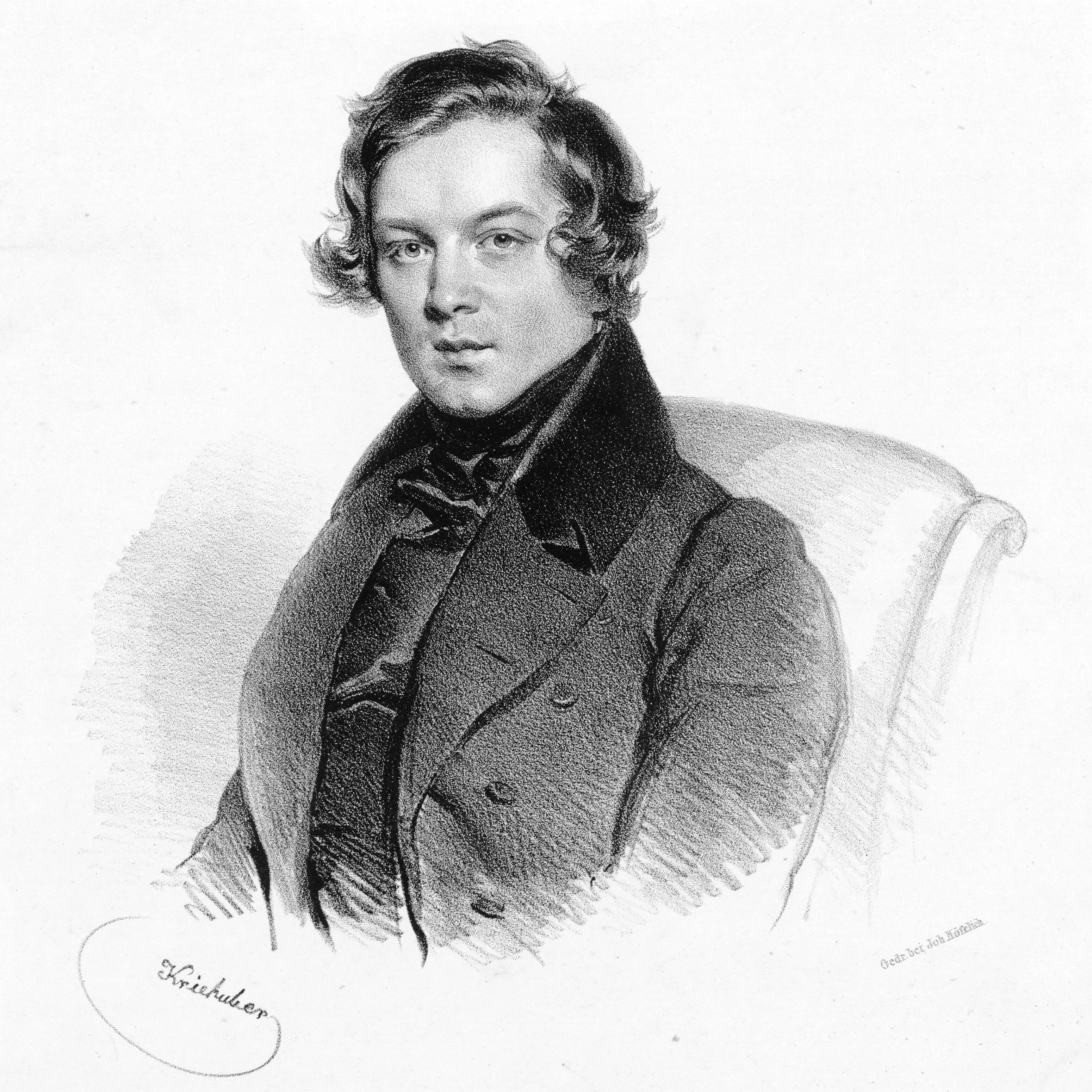
Portrait of Robert Schumann, c. 1839

The Piano Sonata No. 2 in G minor, Op. 22 was composed by Robert Schumann from 1830 to 1834. (Note: Date according to Jensen; Daverio reports that it was begun in "mid-1833".) The piano sonata is dedicated to Schumann's friend the pianist Henriette Voigt and was published in September 1839.

== Background ==
It was one of his three full-length attempts at the sonata genre, the other completed ones being the Piano Sonata No. 1 and Piano Sonata No. 3. Because it was published only in 1839, three years after the F minor sonata, it was given a later opus number (op. 22) but an earlier sequence number (No. 2) was kept. This has caused some confusion, and recordings of the G minor Sonata have sometimes been published as "Sonata No. 3". There was also an earlier sonata in F minor, which Schumann abandoned; this is sometimes referred to as "Sonata No. 4".

Among his sonatas, this one is very frequently performed and recorded. Because of its great variety and highly virtuosic demands, it is enjoyed both by audiences and performers alike. Clara Schumann claimed to be "endlessly looking forward to the second sonata", but nevertheless Robert revised it several times. At Clara Schumann's request, the original finale, marked Presto passionato was replaced with a less difficult movement in 1838. Clara considered it “not too incomprehensible,” though she admitted that she would “play it if necessary, but the masses, the public, and even the connoisseurs for whom one is really writing, don’t understand it.”

== Movements ==
The four movements are:

1. So rasch wie möglich ("As quickly as possible" — however, near the end, Schumann writes "Schneller" and then "Noch schneller", meaning "Faster" and "Still faster")
2. Andantino. Getragen (Solemn/Dignified)
3. Scherzo. Sehr rasch und markiert (Very quick and marked)
4. Rondo. Presto – Prestissimo. Quasi Cadenza

Jensen describes the first movement as having "a concern with motivic structure". The second movement of the sonata is based on Schumann's early song "Im Herbste".
