= Nettie Ottenberg =

American social worker and "Mother of Daycare" (1887–1982)

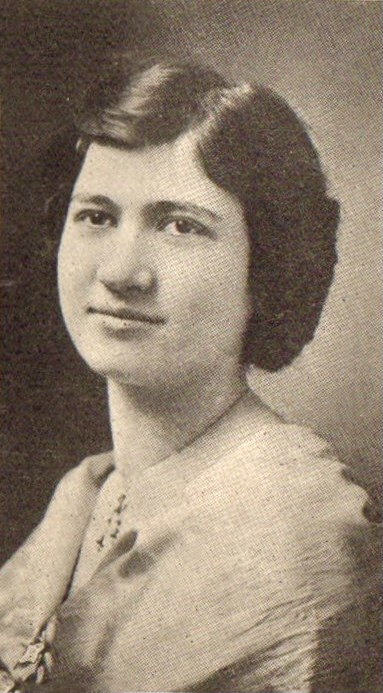
- Ottenberg pictured in the program for the 1913 Woman Suffrage Procession
- Born: Nettie Podell; April 5, 1887; Odessa, Russian Empire
- Died: May 11, 1982 (aged 95)
- Education: New York School of Philanthropy
- Occupation: Social worker
- Years active: 1906–1982
- Spouse: Louis Ottenberg (m. 1912–1960)
- Children: 3, including Miriam Ottenberg
- Parents: Mordecai "Max" Ottenberg (father); Mannie Ottenberg (mother)

Nettie Podell Ottenberg (1887–1982) was an American social worker. She was one of the first trained social workers in the United States. An advocate for women's suffrage, voting rights for Washington, D.C., and childcare, in the 1960s she won the first federal funding for daycare and the nickname "The Mother of Daycare".

== Early life in Odessa, New York and Philadelphia ==
Nettie Podell was born in Odessa in the Russian Empire (present-day Ukraine) on April 5, 1887, to Mordecai "Max" Podell (died 1922), a bookkeeper, and Mannie Podell. She had three brothers: Morris, David, and Jack. Her father was a linguist who often helped neighbors by translating letters from relatives who had immigrated to the United States and soon he was persuaded to go too. He moved first and the rest of the family immigrated to the United States in 1893.

From age five Nettie grew up on the Lower East Side of New York City and by her teenage years was horrified by the treatment of impoverished immigrants in the tenements of the Lower East Side, as the destitute were deported; this drew her to social work. She did not attend high school, enrolling directly in professional school, the New York School of Philanthropy (later part of Columbia University) and working as a secretary for $5 a week to afford her education. She graduated first in her class in 1905. She then became a probation officer in Philadelphia for three years, where she worked with Scott Nearing (then secretary to the Pennsylvania Child Labour Committee) and was proud of her record of never committing a boy to an institution. In 1909, she began working for the Brooklyn Council of Jewish Women, examining newly arrived immigrant girls. She was also a suffragist, and organized and ran, from 1909 to 1911, the first political settlement house for suffrage workers, located in Harlem, New York, thanks to an encounter with Alva Belmont whom Podell persuaded to fund the endeavor.

== Washington, D.C. years ==
On April 10, 1912, Nettie Podell married Louis Ottenberg, a lawyer in Washington, D.C., whose father founded Ottenberg Bakery, and joined him in Washington. The Ottenbergs had three children: Regina, Miriam, and Louis Ottenberg Jr.

A suffragist, Ottenberg was an organizer of the 1913 Woman Suffrage Procession down Pennsylvania Avenue in Washington. In 1920, after women won the right to vote, Ottenberg cofounded the "Voteless DC" chapter of the League of Women Voters, as Washingtonians were not allowed to vote for US President at the time. At the 1936 national conference of the League, she urged the group to support federal voting rights for Washington. In 1937, Ottenberg became the D.C. chapter's president, serving a two-year term. In the same period (1937 to 1939), she was also president of the Washington, DC Section of the National Council of Jewish Women (NCJW), and from 1928 to 1977 was a representative to its Women's Joint Congressional Committee. She used these platforms as well to advocate for federal suffrage for D.C. and by 1957, the group had voiced criticism that racism played a part in the refusal to extend the franchise to D.C. In 1953, the League of Women Voters named her Citizen of the Year.

Other reform issues Ottenberg worked on included women's prisons, child labor and juvenile court systems, helping write D.C.'s juvenile court law.

In the 1960s, Ottenberg turned her attention to the issue of child care, which was emerging as a newly urgent issue as more middle-class women began working outside the home, and Ottenberg's successful advocacy earned her the title "The Mother of Daycare" in the press. In 1963 she was appointed to the Public Welfare Advisory Committee and the next year won the first ever federal funding for day care. From 1964 through the 1970s, she was a board member of the National Child Day Care Association in Washington, D.C. She successfully lobbied for $1.5 million to fund a pilot day care program D.C., run by the Association; the model program included a health screening for the children involved. She also advocated for use of Medicaid funding to provide children in poverty with early and regular health screenings and treatment.

== Later life ==
Ottenberg's husband Louis died on May 10, 1960.

Ottenberg worked into her 90s, profiled in The Washington Post in a 1977 piece subtitled "Granny Patrols at 90". She told the Post: "I don't have time to think about old age. I try to listen to the problems of today." She propounded a variety of policy proposals: a tax exemption for landlords who offered on-site daycare; a program to address muggings of the elderly by instead paying young people to accompany them on their errands; funding for special education in public schools; among other ideas.

At the time she was living in an apartment on Connecticut Avenue and spending winters in Miami Beach, Florida, with yoga, swimming and walking several miles a day making up her regular exercise routine. In the last two years of her life, beginning in 1980, Ottenberg lived in an apartment next door to her daughter Miriam Ottenberg, a Pulitzer Prize-winning reporter who was then in failing health. Nettie Ottenberg died of pneumonia on May 11, 1982, in Washington, D.C. She was survived by her three children, three grandchildren, and two great-grandchildren, though daughter Miriam died in November of the same year.
