= Henriette Voigt =

German pianist

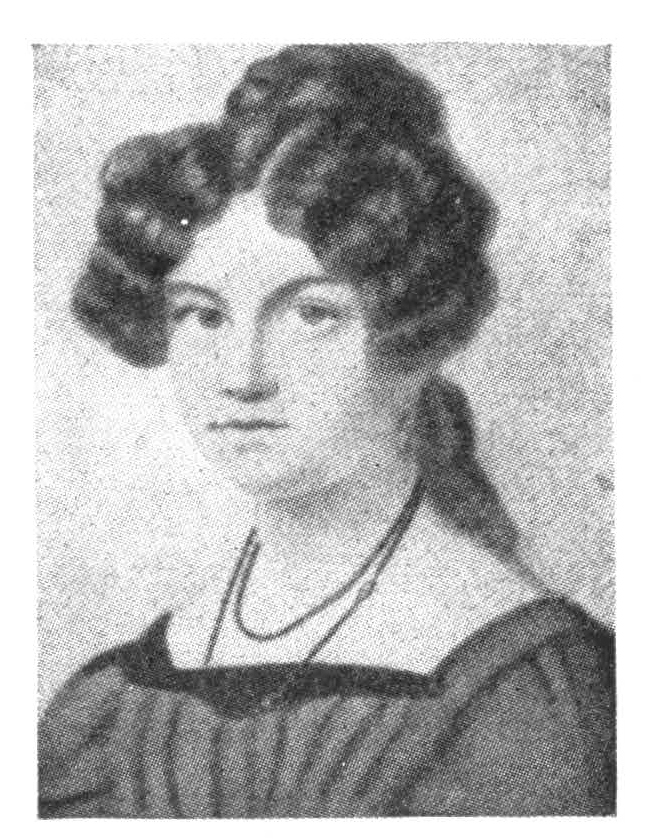
Pastel portrait

Henriette Voigt (24 November 1808 - 15 October 1839) was a German pianist. Born Henriette Kunze in Leipzig, Voigt was a pupil of Ludwig Berger. She was the wife of merchant Karl Voigt, at whose house many of the most important musicians of the day gathered. She was the dedicatee of the second piano sonata of Robert Schumann. As a pianist she would sometimes play four-handed piano with Felix Mendelssohn. With Karl she was the mother of two daughters, whose godfathers were Mendelssohn and Schumann. Voigt died in the city of her birth.
