= Jonathan Carr (writer) =

British journalist and writer

Jonathan Carr (1942–2008) was a British journalist and author, who lived and worked primarily in Germany.

He was born in Berkhamsted, Hertfordshire.

He worked as a correspondent in turns for Reuters, Radio Free Europe, The Economist, The Financial Times, and again for The Economist. He met then-chancellor Helmut Schmidt professionally; they eventually developed a close personal friendship, and he wrote the biography Helmut Schmidt: Helmsman of Germany in 1985.

His 1993 book Goodbye Germany, occasioned by German reunification, was an international bestseller, and in 1998 he wrote Mahler: a Biography of the Austrian composer.

He died in Königswinter, North Rhine-Westphalia at the age of 66, on 12 June 2008, on the very day his final book The Wagner Clan was published.

== Works ==
- Helmut Schmidt: Helmsman of Germany. London: Weidenfeld & Nicolson, 1985. ISBN 0-297-78372-6; US edition: New York: St. Martin's Press, 1985. ISBN 0-312-36744-9
- The Real Mahler. London: Constable, 1997. ISBN 978-0-0947-5650-2; US edition: Mahler: A Biography. Woodstock, N.Y.: Overlook Press, 1998. ISBN 0-87951-802-2
- The Wagner Clan. London: Faber & Faber, 2007. ISBN 978-0-5712-0785-5; US edition: The Wagner Clan: The Saga of Germany's Most Illustrious and Infamous Family. Atlantic Monthly Press, 2007. ISBN 0-87113-975-8
