= Hans-Günter Ottenberg =

German musicologist (born 1947)

Hans-Günter Ottenberg (born 2 March 1947) is a German musicologist and teacher.

== Life ==
Born in Niederbobritzsch, Saxony, Ottenberg studied music education and German culture at the University of Rostock from 1965 and musicology at the Humboldt University Berlin from 1967. He received his doctorate from Humboldt University in 1972 and in the same year became a research assistant at the Konzerthalle Carl Philipp Emanuel Bach Frankfurt (Oder). From 1978 to 1991, Ottenberg was a senior assistant at the Philosophy and Cultural Studies Section, later the Faculty of Humanities and Social Sciences at the Technical University of Dresden, and habilitated at the Martin Luther University of Halle-Wittenberg in 1991.

In 1993, he was appointed professor and holder of the chair of musicology at the Institute of Art and Musicology at the TU Dresden.

== Work ==
as author

- Die Entwicklung des theoretisch-ästhetischen Denkens innerhalb der Berliner Musikkultur von den Anfängen der Aufklärung bis Reichardt. Deutscher Verlag für Musik, Leipzig 1978 (zugl. Dissertation, Universität Berlin 1972).
- Carl Philipp Emanuel Bach. 2nd edition. Reclam, Leipzig 1982, ISBN 3-379-00224-0.
- Untersuchungen zur sozialen Stellung des Musikers, zur kompositorischen Produktion und Distribution in der zweiten Hälfte des 18. Jahrhunderts unter besonderer Berücksichtigung des Werkes von Carl Philipp Emanuel Bach (1714–1788). Habilitationsschrift, Universität Halle 1990 (2 volumes.).
- Carl Philipp Emanuel Bach – Spurensuche. Leben und Werk in Selbstzeugnissen und Dokumenten seiner Zeitgenossen. Seemann Verlag, Leipzig 1994.

as editor

- Johann Wolfgang von Goethe – Carl Friedrich Zelter. Briefwechsel; eine Auswahl. Reclam, Leipzig 1987, ISBN 3-379-00092-2.
- Carl Philipp Emanuel Bach als Lehrer. Die Verbreitung der Musik Carl Philipp Emanuel Bachs in England und Skandinavien. Musikgesellschaft "C. P. E. Bach", Frankfurt/Oder 2005, ISBN 3-00-015134-6.
