= Ortrun Landmann =

German librarian and music historian

Ortrun Landmann (born 11 May 1937) is a German musicologist.

== Life ==
Landmann was born as daughter of the aircraft designer and university teacher Hermann Landmann in Szczecin. After her studies and doctorate at the University of Rostock she was a research assistant to the conductors Otmar Suitner and Herbert Blomstedt as well as to the music department of the Saxon State and University Library Dresden. From 1987 until her retirement, she was head of the Répertoire International des Sources Musicales department at the State Library Dresden.

The focus of her historical musicology work is the music at the Electorate of Saxony court in Dresden and the work of the Staatskapelle Dresden.

== Work ==
- Die Dresdener italienische Oper zwischen Hasse und Weber : ein Daten- und Quellenverzeichnis für die Jahre 1765-1817.
- Über das Musikerbe der Sächsischen Staatskapelle (2009, Volltext, 2. Ausgabe, 2010, Volltext).
- Zu den Dresdner Hofnotisten des 18. Jahrhunderts. Sieben Thesen und ein Anhang (2014, Volltext).
- Das Dresdner Opernarchiv in der Sächsischen Landesbibliothek – Staats- und Universitätsbibliothek Dresden. CD-ROM-Katalog mit Begleitband, published by the SLUB and the RISM-Arbeitsgruppe Deutschland, Munich 2002.
- Katalog der Dresdener Hasse-Musikhandschriften. CD-ROM edition with booklet, published by the RISM-Arbeitsgruppe Deutschland, Munich 1999.
- Die Telemann-Quellen der Sächsischen Landesbibliothek. Handschriften und zeitgenössische Druckausgaben seiner Werke. Studien zur Musikgeschichte Dresdens. issue 4, Dresden 1983.
- Die Dresdener italienische Oper zwischen Hasse und Weber. Ein Daten- und Quellenverzeichnis. Studien und Materialien zur Musikgeschichte Dresdens, issue 2, Dresden 1976.
- Quellenstudien zum Intermezzo comico per musica und zu seiner Geschichte in Dresden. Phil. Dissertation, Rostock 1972.
