= Henriette Grabau-Bünau =

German operatic mezzo-soprano

Eleonore Henriette Magdalena Grabau-Bünau, also Henriette Grabau or Henriette Bünau, (29 March 1805 – 28 November 1852) was a German concert singer mezzo-soprano. For twelve years she was the main singer at the Leipzig Gewandhaus and from 1843 to 1849 she was the first female teacher at the Leipzig Conservatory.

== Life ==
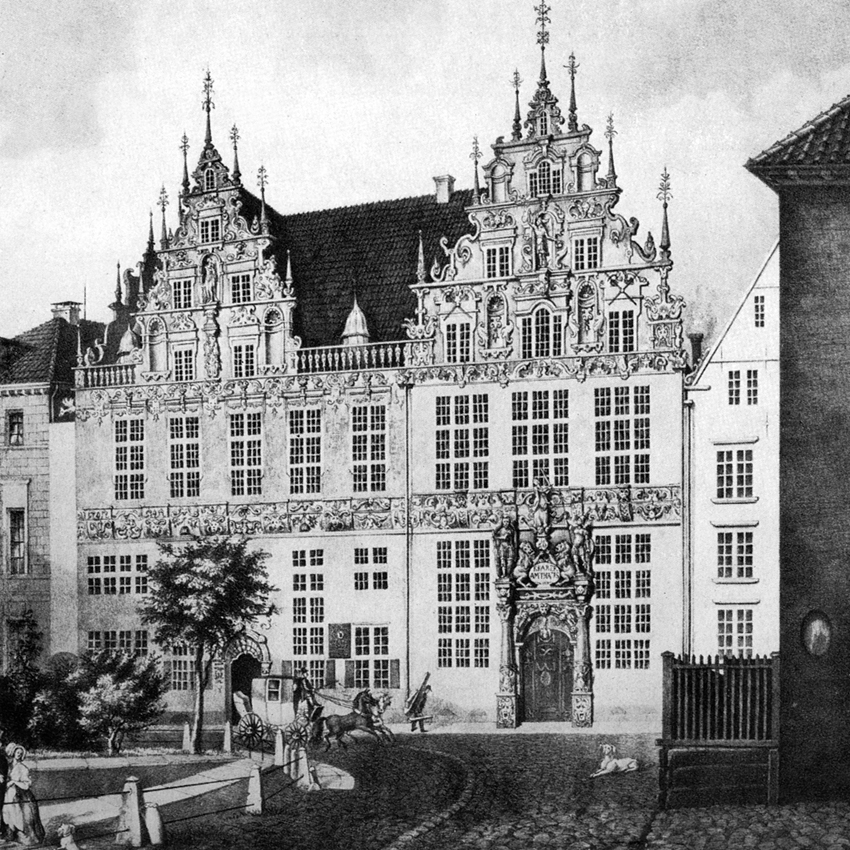
Steel engraving of the Wandschneiderhaus (then Kramer-Amtshaus) in Bremen after a drawing by Friedrich Wilhelm Kohl from 1848. Place of performance of Henriette Grabaus in the 1820s.

=== Childhood and education in Bremen and Dresden ===
Born in Bremen, Grabau was the daughter of the teacher and organist of the Church of Our Lady, Bremen and St. Remberti in Bremen Lebrecht Grabau and of Margarethe Anna Adelheid Arensberg. Her father founded the Grabau'schen Singverein in 1811. Henriette Grabau grew up with five siblings and received her first voice and piano lessons from her father and from the Bremen music director Wilhelm Friedrich Riem. her brother Georg Christian (1806-1854) was organist in Verden, her brother Andreas (1808-1885) a famous cellist in Leipzig and from 1843 teacher at the local conservatory. Her sister Adelheid (1807-1854) was a concert singer in Bremen and Leipzig, also her sister Maria (1812-after 1849) became a concert singer. Her brother Christian Grabau (1810-1874) became a painter.

Several concerts by Henriette Grabau in Bremen in the 1820s, often in the ballroom of the Kramer-Amtshaus, are documented. From 1824, she studied singing in Dresden with the Bohemian singer and singing teacher Johann Aloys Miksch. In 1827, she appeared together with her sister Adelheid at the Theater Bremen, but also gave several concerts together with her in Leipzig in the 1830s.

=== Leipzig ===
In spring 1826, through Miksch's mediation, she successfully performed a subscription concert with an aria by Rossini in the Leipzig Gewandhaus. Thereupon, she was engaged by the Concert-Direction for twelve years as the main singer in the Gewandhaus. Her sister Adelheid also performed here in the late 1820s. In 1835 Felix Mendelssohn Bartholdy was appointed Kapellmeister in Leipzig, who promoted Henriette Grabau and used her for concerts in the Gewandhaus until 1837. She also sang in the first public concert of Clara Wieck at the Gewandhaus on 20 October 1828, and frequently appeared with her in the subscription concerts of the Leipzig Gewandhaus in the early 1830s.

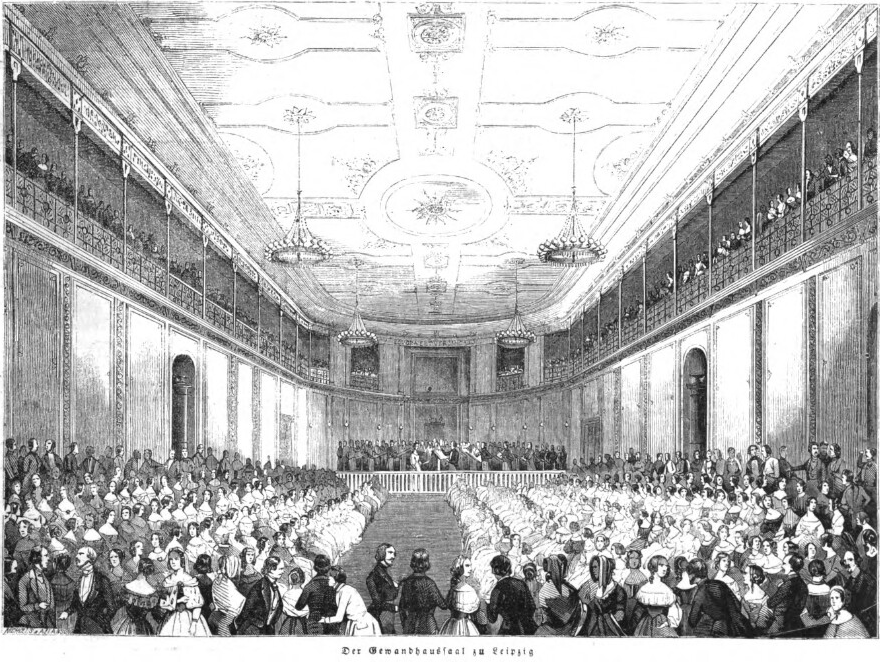
Gewandhaussaal Leipzig, fig. in Illustrirte Zeitung, 19 April 1845, p. 253

In 1836 she was the soloist of the first performance of Mendelssohn-Bartholdy's Paulus in Düsseldorf. He engaged her repeatedly for the Niederrheinisches Musikfest. In 1836 she sang for the role of Vitellia in Titus by Mozart. In 1837, she sang in a concert of the piano virtuoso Adolf Henselt at the invitation of Robert Schumann in Leipzig. She was friends with Henselt and with him at Davidsbündler (under the name of "Maria"), a circle of young artists founded by Schumann in the Leipzig pub "Zum Arabischen Coffe Baum". She was on friendly terms with the Schumanns, as evidenced by several surviving letters.

Mendelssohn enthused on 30 October 1835: "She is one of the few genuine musical singers I have met, she could conduct the orchestra on the side, or play the piano or harp if she wanted to ... if she just wanted to be pretty and younger! One could fall in love over the ears." One day later, Mendelssohn wrote to the painter Eduard Hildebrandt: "[...] I have seldom heard such perfection from a German singer, and the sons of Düsseldorf's muses would rave if they could hear this golden lecture. [...]“

In 1843, the Leipzig Conservatory was founded, a predecessor institution of today's University of Music and Theatre Leipzig. Henriette Grabau, the violin virtuoso Ferdinand David, the violinist and music theorist Moritz Hauptmann, the organist and music writer Carl Ferdinand Becker and Robert Schumann taught there; Henriette Grabau was the first and at that time only female teacher of choral and solo singing until 1849.

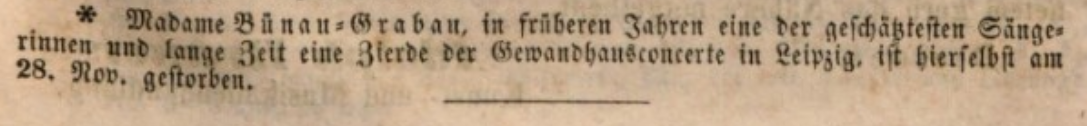
Death notice of Madame Bünau-Grabau in the newspaper Signale für die musikalische Welt, 1852 issue 49, p. 441

In 1837, she married the merchant Julius Alexander Bünau (1809-1871); in 1838 her daughter Helene (d. 1893) was born. Helene Grabau-Bünau gave her last official concert on 21 March 1839, but she still performed occasionally in the 1840s, for example at charity concerts and on special occasions: in 1841 in the Wenzelskirche in Naumburg at the pre-celebration of the birthday of King of Prussia, 1843 in the premiere and revival of Robert Schumann's Paradise and the Peri op. 50 in Leipzig and in the same year at the unveiling ceremony of the Old Bach Monument. Henriette Grabau-Bünau also took part in the commemoration of Mendelssohn's death on 4 November 1847.

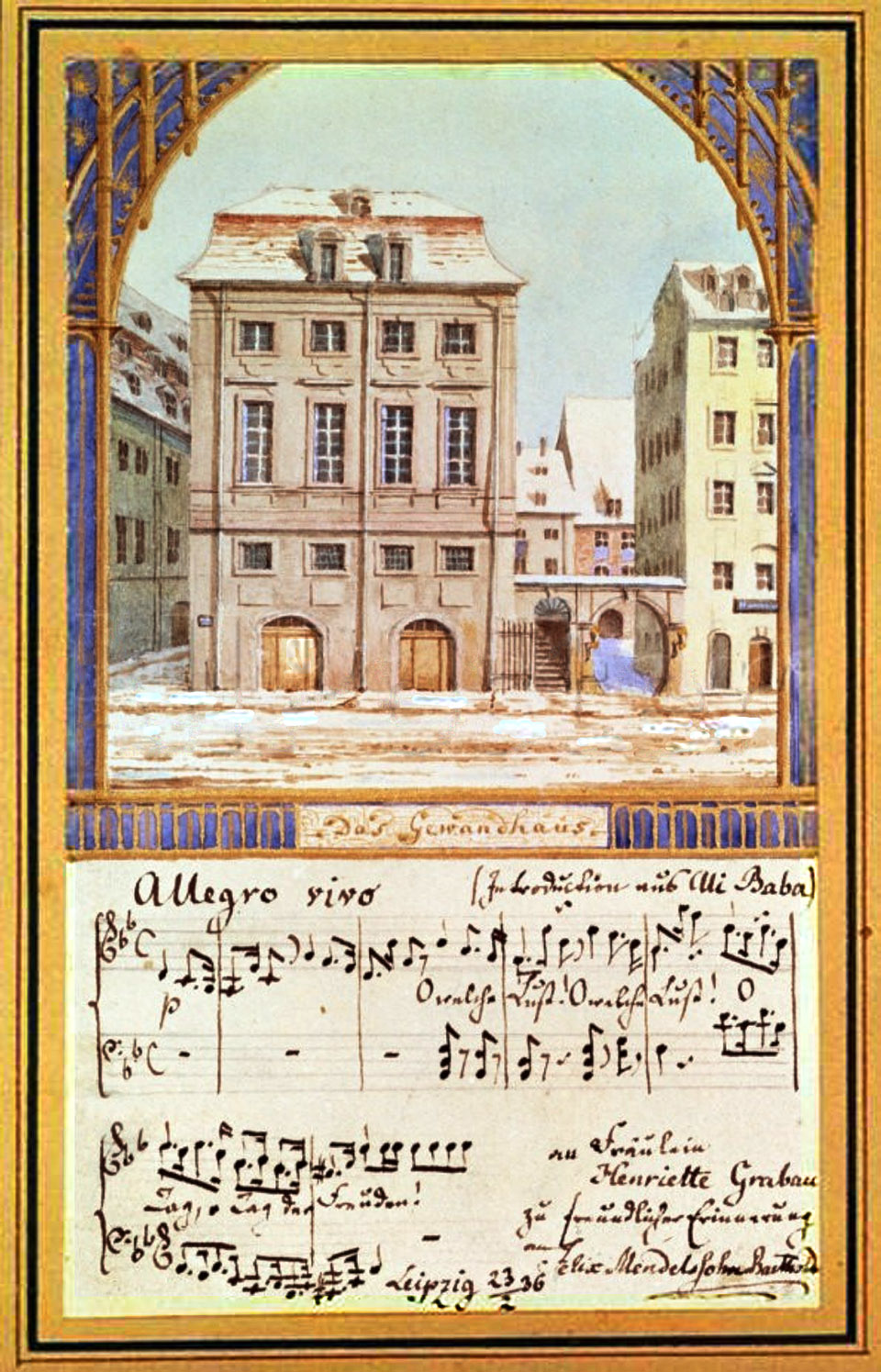
The old Gewandhaus with scores from the opera Ali-Baba or The Forty Robbers by Luigi Cherubini, watercolour by Felix Mendelssohn Bartholdy (1836) in the family register of Henriette Grabau, dedicated to her, performed at Mendelssohn's inaugural concert on 4 October 1835

Grabau died in Leipzig aged 47.

== Music log book ==
In Henriette Grabau's music album (1836-1852) there is a copy of Mendelssohn's Songs without Words and an excerpt from the opera Ali Baba by Luigi Cherubini, notated by Mendelssohn. This album also contains Mendelssohn's watercolour of the Leipzig Gewandhaus and autographs of Franz Liszt, Maria Malibran, Robert Schumann and Clara Schumann as well as Friedrich Rochlitz (Numerized, Helene Bünau legacy, Gertrude Clarke Whittall Foundation Collection of the Library of Congress)
