= Philistinism =

Hostility towards art, beauty, spirituality, and intellect

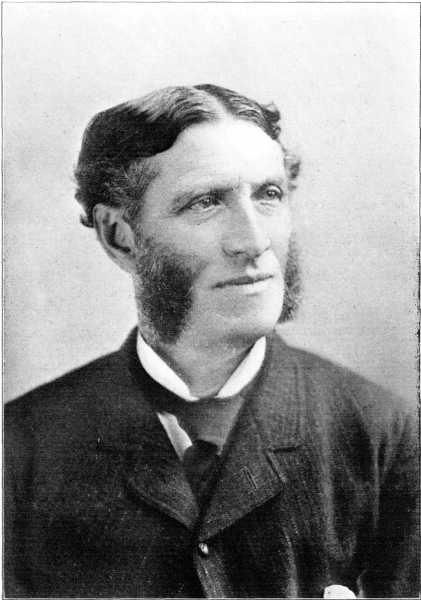
The British poet and cultural critic Matthew Arnold adapted the German word Philister to English as the word philistine to denote anti-intellectualism.

In the fields of philosophy and of aesthetics, the term philistinism describes the attitudes, habits, and characteristics of a person who deprecates art, beauty, spirituality, and intellect. As a derogatory term, philistine describes a person who is narrow-minded and hostile to the life of the mind, whose materialistic and wealth-oriented worldview and tastes indicate an indifference to cultural and aesthetic values.

The contemporary meaning of philistine derives from Matthew Arnold's adaptation to English of the German word Philister, as applied by university students in their antagonistic relations with the townspeople of Jena, early modern Germany, where a riot resulted in several deaths in 1689. Preaching about the riot, Georg Heinrich Götze, the ecclesiastical superintendent, applied the word Philister in his sermon analysing the social class hostilities between students and townspeople. Götze addressed the town-vs-gown matter with an admonishing sermon, "The Philistines Be Upon Thee", drawn from the Book of Judges (Chapt. 16, Samson vs the Philistines), of the Old Testament.

== History ==
In German usage, university students applied the term Philister (Philistine) to describe a person who was not trained at university; in the social context of early modern Germany, the term identified the man (Philister) and woman (Philisterin) who was not from the university.

In Britain, the term philistine—a person hostile to aesthetic and intellectual discourse—was in common use by the 1820s, and was applied to the bourgeois, materialistic, merchant middle class of the Victorian Era (1837–1901), whose newly acquired social status and wealth rendered some of them hostile to cultural traditions which favored aristocratic power. Regarding the philistines, Matthew Arnold wrote in Culture and Anarchy: An Essay in Political and Social Criticism (1869):

Now, the use of culture is that it helps us, by means of its spiritual standard of perfection, to regard wealth as but machinery, and not only to say as a matter of words that we regard wealth as but machinery, but really to perceive and feel that it is so. If it were not for this purging effect wrought upon our minds by culture, the whole world, the future, as well as the present, would inevitably belong to the Philistines. The people who believe most that our greatness and welfare are proved by our being very rich, and who most give their lives and thoughts to becoming rich, are just the people whom we call the Philistines. Culture says: "Consider these people, then, their way of life, their habits, their manners, the very tones of their voices; look at them attentively; observe the literature they read, the things which give them pleasure, the words which come forth out of their mouths, the thoughts which make the furniture of their minds; would any amount of wealth be worth having with the condition that one was to become just like these people by having it?"

— Culture and Anarchy: An Essay in Political and Social Criticism (1869), pp. 28–29.

== Usages ==
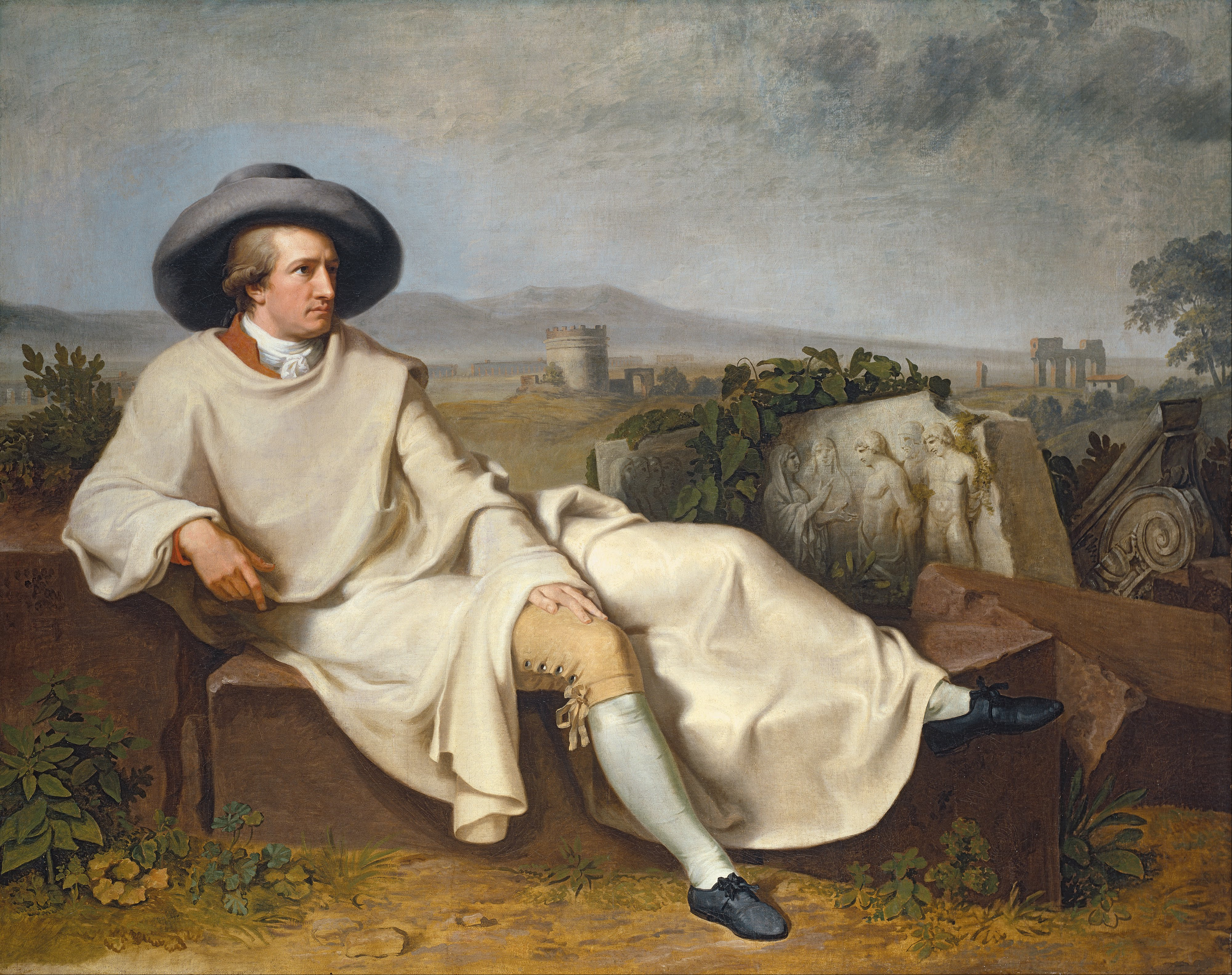
Johann Wolfgang von Goethe described the philistine personality. (Goethe in the Roman Campagna, 1786, by J. H. W. Tischbein)

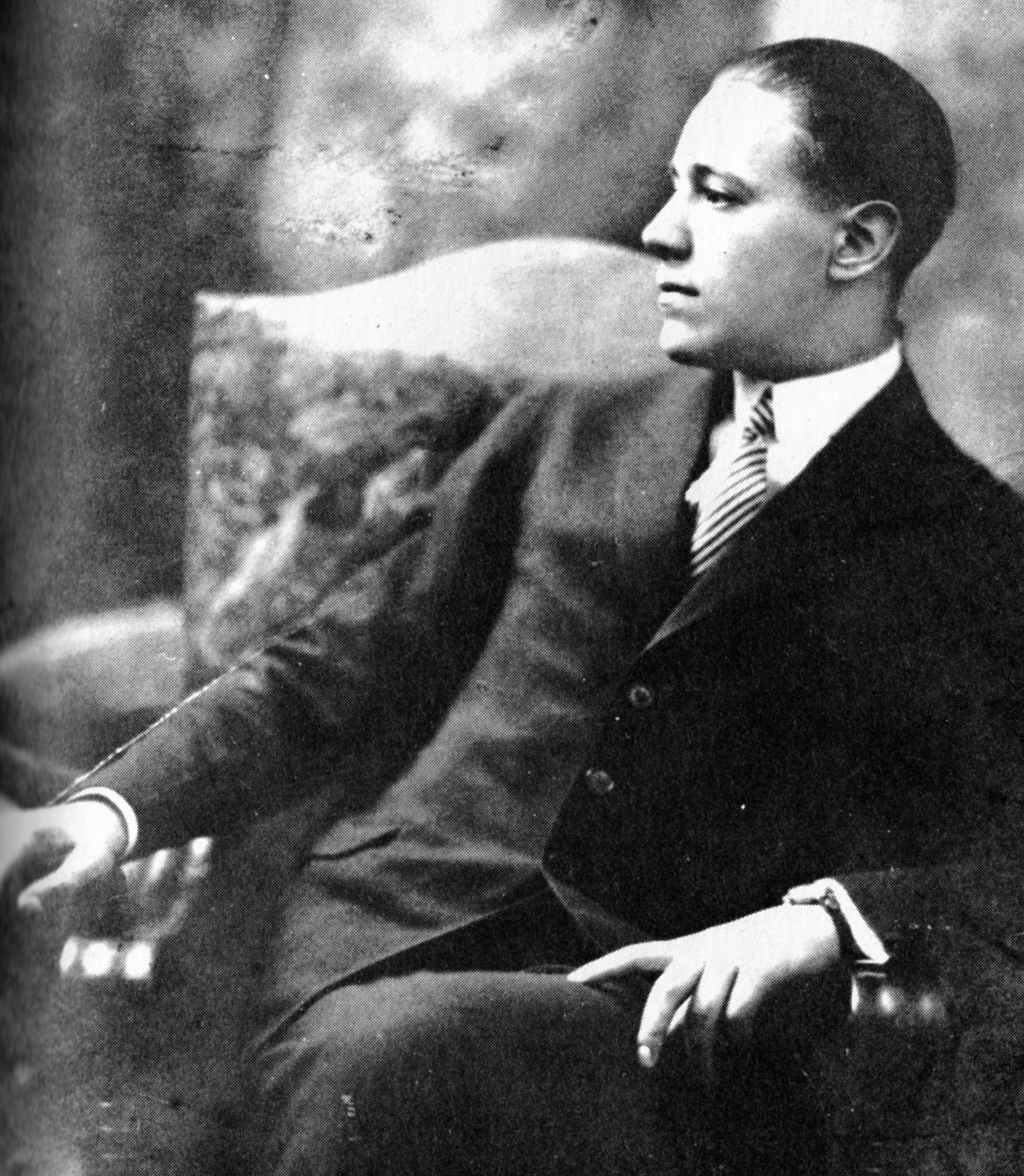
The novelist Ödön von Horváth chronicled the coarseness of affect that limited the worldview of the bourgeoisie. (ca. 1919)

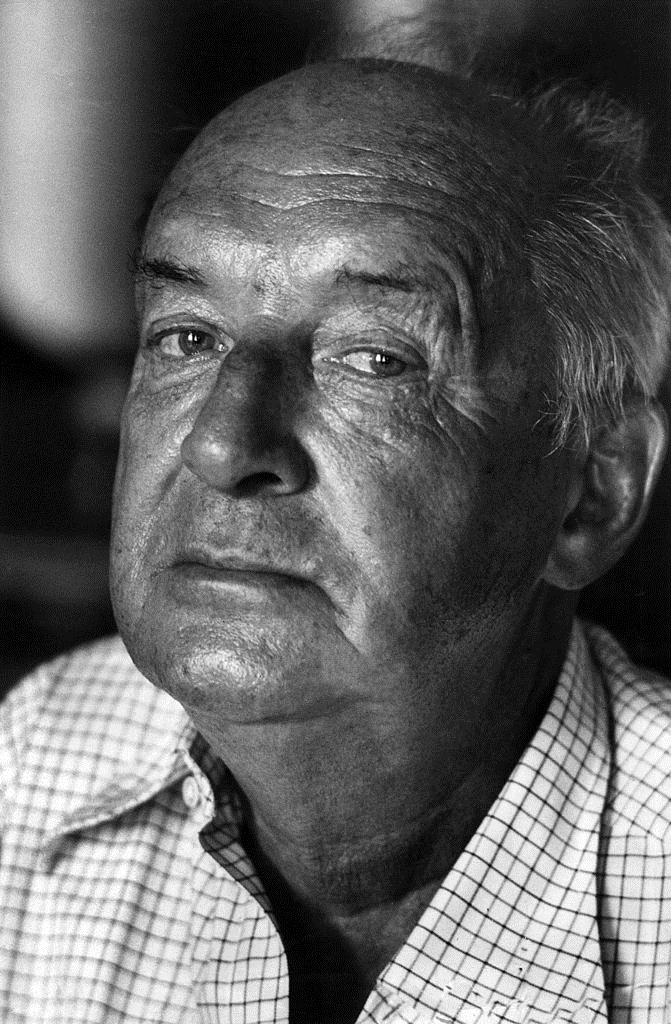
Vladimir Nabokov described the natures of philistinism and of the philistine. (1973)

The denotations and connotations of the terms philistinism and philistine describe people who are hostile to art, culture, and the life of the mind, and, in their stead, favor economic materialism and conspicuous consumption as paramount human activities.

=== 17th century ===
Whilst involved in a lawsuit, the writer and poet Jonathan Swift (1667–1745), in the slang of his time, described a gruff bailiff as a philistine, someone who is considered a merciless enemy.

=== 18th century ===
The polymath Johann Wolfgang von Goethe (1749–1832) described the philistine personality, by asking:

What is a philistine? A hollow gut, full of fear and hope that God will have mercy!

Goethe described such men and women, by noting that:

The Philistine not only ignores all conditions of life which are not his own, but also demands that the rest of mankind should fashion its mode of existence after his own.

In the comedy of manners play, The Rivals (1775), Richard Brinsley Sheridan (1751–1816) identifies a violent aristocrat as 'that bloodthirsty Philistine, Sir Lucius O'Trigger'.

=== 19th century ===
Thomas Carlyle often wrote of gigs and "gigmanity" as a sign of classist materialism; Arnold recognized Carlyle's use of the term as being synonymous with philistine. Carlyle used "philistine" to describe William Taylor in 1831. He also used it in Sartor Resartus (1833–34) and in The Life of John Sterling (1851), remembering conversations where "Philistines would enter, what we call bores, dullards, Children of Darkness".

The composer Robert Schumann (1810–1856) created Davidsbündler, a fictional society whose purpose is to fight the philistines. This fight appears in some of his musical pieces, such as Davidsbündlertänze, Op. 6, and the concluding part of his Carnaval, op. 9, which is titled "Marche des Davidsbündler contre les Philistins".

In The Sickness Unto Death (1849), the philosopher Søren Kierkegaard criticises the spiritlessness of the philistine-bourgeois mentality of triviality and the self-deception of despair.

The philosopher Friedrich Nietzsche (1844–1900) identified the philistine as a person who, for a lack of true cultural unity, can only define style in the negative and through cultural conformity. The essay "David Strauss: the Confessor and the Writer" in Untimely Meditations is an extended critique of nineteenth-century German Philistinism.

In his 1897 letter De Profundis, author Oscar Wilde wrote, "The Philistine element in life is not the failure to understand Art. Charming people such as fishermen, shepherds, ploughboys, peasants and the like know nothing about Art, and are the very salt of the earth. He is the Philistine who upholds and aids the heavy, cumbrous, blind mechanical forces of Society, and who does not recognise the dynamic force when he meets it either in a man or in a movement."

=== 20th century ===
- In the novel Der ewige Spießer (The Eternal Philistine, 1930), the Austro–Hungarian writer Ödön von Horváth (1901–38) derided the cultural coarseness of the philistine man and his limited view of the world. The eponymous philistine is a failed businessman, a salesman of used cars, who aspires to the high-life of wealth; to realise that aspiration, he seeks to meet a rich woman who will support him, and so embarks upon a rail journey from Munich to Barcelona to seek her at the World's Fair.
- In the Lectures on Russian Literature (1981), in the essay 'Philistines and Philistinism' the writer Vladimir Nabokov (1899–1977) describes the philistine man and woman as:

A full-grown person whose interests are of a material and commonplace nature, and whose mentality is formed of the stock ideas and conventional ideals of his or her group and time. I have said "full-grown" person because the child or the adolescent who may look like a small philistine is only a small parrot mimicking the ways of confirmed vulgarians, and it is easier to be a parrot than to be a white heron. "Vulgarian" is more or less synonymous with "philistine": the stress in a vulgarian is not so much on the conventionalism of a philistine, as on the vulgarity of some of his conventional notions. I may also use the terms "genteel" and "bourgeois". Genteel implies the lace-curtain refined vulgarity, which is worse than simple coarseness. To burp in company may be rude, but to say "excuse me" after a burp is genteel, and thus worse than vulgar. The term bourgeois I use following Flaubert, not Marx. Bourgeois, in Flaubert's sense, is a state of mind, not a state of pocket. A bourgeois is a smug philistine, a dignified vulgarian . . . generally speaking, philistinism presupposes a certain advanced state of civilization, where, throughout the ages, certain traditions have accumulated in a heap and have started to stink.

- In the Lectures on Literature (1982), in speaking of the novel Madame Bovary (1856), about the bourgeois wife of a country doctor, Nabokov said that philistinism is manifest in the prudish attitude demonstrated by the man or the woman who accuses a work of art of being obscene.

== See also ==
- Anti-intellectualism
- Barbarism
- Boeotian
- Bourgeois
- Chav
- Conspicuous consumption
- Conformism
- Consumerism
- Culture and Anarchy
- Dumbing down
- Hoi polloi
- Idiocracy
- Low class
- Lowbrow
- Mass culture
- Plebeian
- Populism
- Poshlost
- Redneck
- Vulgarity
- White trash
- Underclass
