= Gewandhaus =

Concert hall in Leipzig, Germany

Coordinates: 51°20′16″N 12°22′50″E

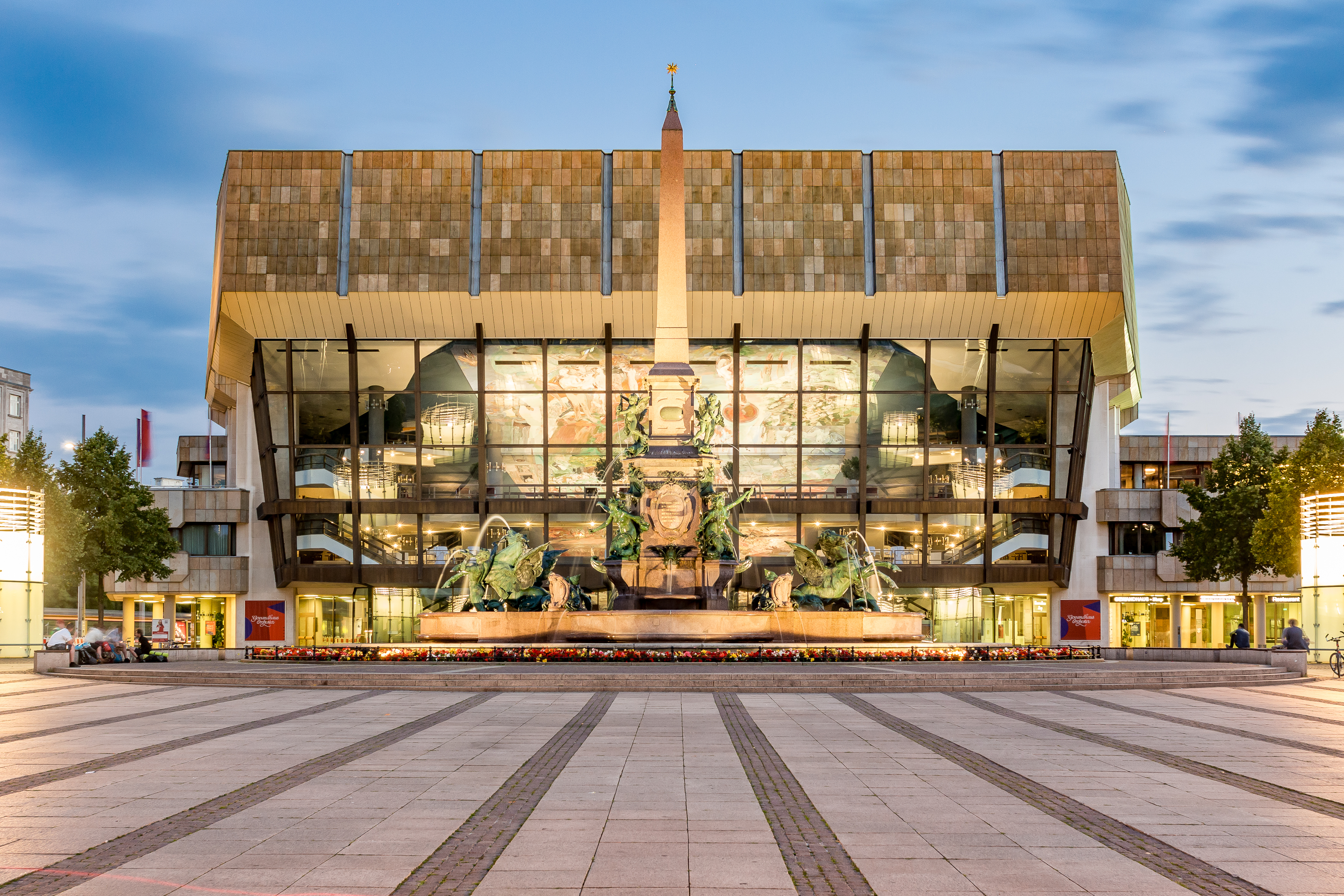
The Gewandhaus at the Augustusplatz in Leipzig-Mitte with the Mendebrunnen at night (2016).

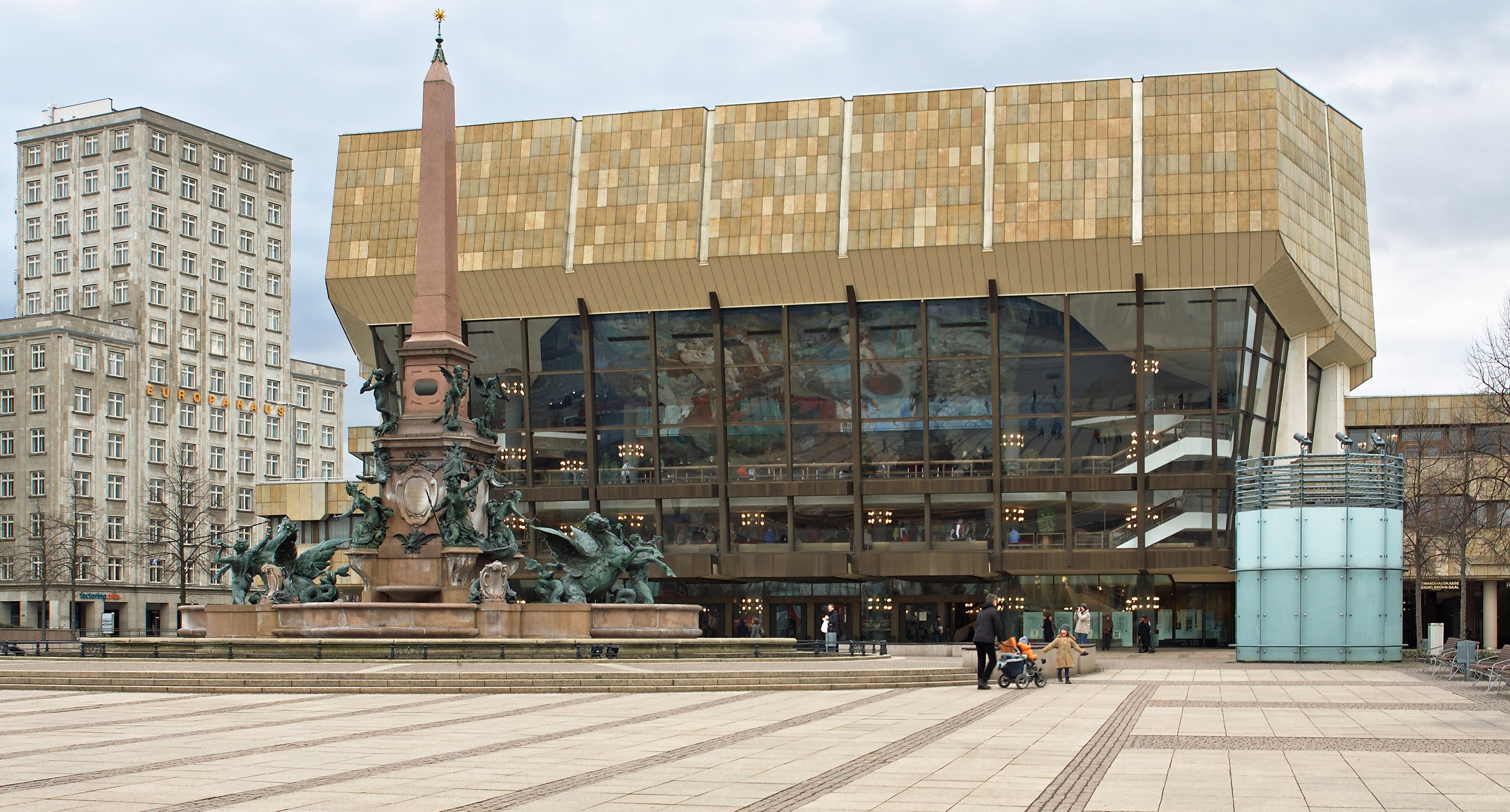
Gewandhaus in 2011

Gewandhaus (German: [ɡəˈvanthaʊs]) is a concert hall in Leipzig, the home of the Leipzig Gewandhaus Orchestra. Today's hall is the third to bear this name; like the second, it is noted for its fine acoustics.

== History ==
=== The first Gewandhaus (Altes Gewandhaus) ===
The first concert hall was constructed in 1781 by architect Johann Carl Friedrich Dauthe inside the Gewandhaus, a building used by cloth (garment) merchants. Beethoven's Piano Concerto No. 5 (The Emperor Concerto) premiered there in 1811. Felix Mendelssohn is particularly associated with the first Gewandhaus, of which he became director in 1835.

Other works that premiered at the Altes Gewandhaus include:

- Schubert's Great Symphony (21 March 1839)
- Schumann's Spring Symphony (31 March 1841)
- Mendelssohn's Scottish Symphony (3 March 1842)
- Mendelssohn's Violin Concerto (13 March 1845)
- Wagner's overture to Die Meistersinger von Nürnberg (2 June 1862; the full opera was not performed until 1868)
- Brahms's A German Requiem (first full performance, 18 February 1869)
- Brahms's Violin Concerto (1 January 1879)

The Altes Gewandhaus was used for concerts until 1886. Despite several expansions, it eventually became too small to accommodate the burgeoning number of concertgoers from Germany's newly emergent middle class. Between 1893 and 1896 it was repurposed, partially demolished, and refitted to form an annexe of the Städtisches Kaufhaus.

=== The second Gewandhaus ===
The second Gewandhaus was designed by Martin Gropius. It was in the new neighbourhood Musikviertel and opened on 11 December 1884. It had a main concert hall and a chamber music hall. During this era the Gewandhaus was directed by conductors such as Arthur Nikisch, Wilhelm Furtwängler and Bruno Walter.

It was severely damaged in the firebombing of Leipzig in World War II during raids on 4 December 1943 and 20 February 1944. Despite initial plans for rebuilding, the East German government deemed the ruins too structurally unsound, and they were demolished on 29 March 1968. The site was used as a car park for decades until the Humanities faculty of Leipzig University opened on the grounds in 2002.

=== The third Gewandhaus ===
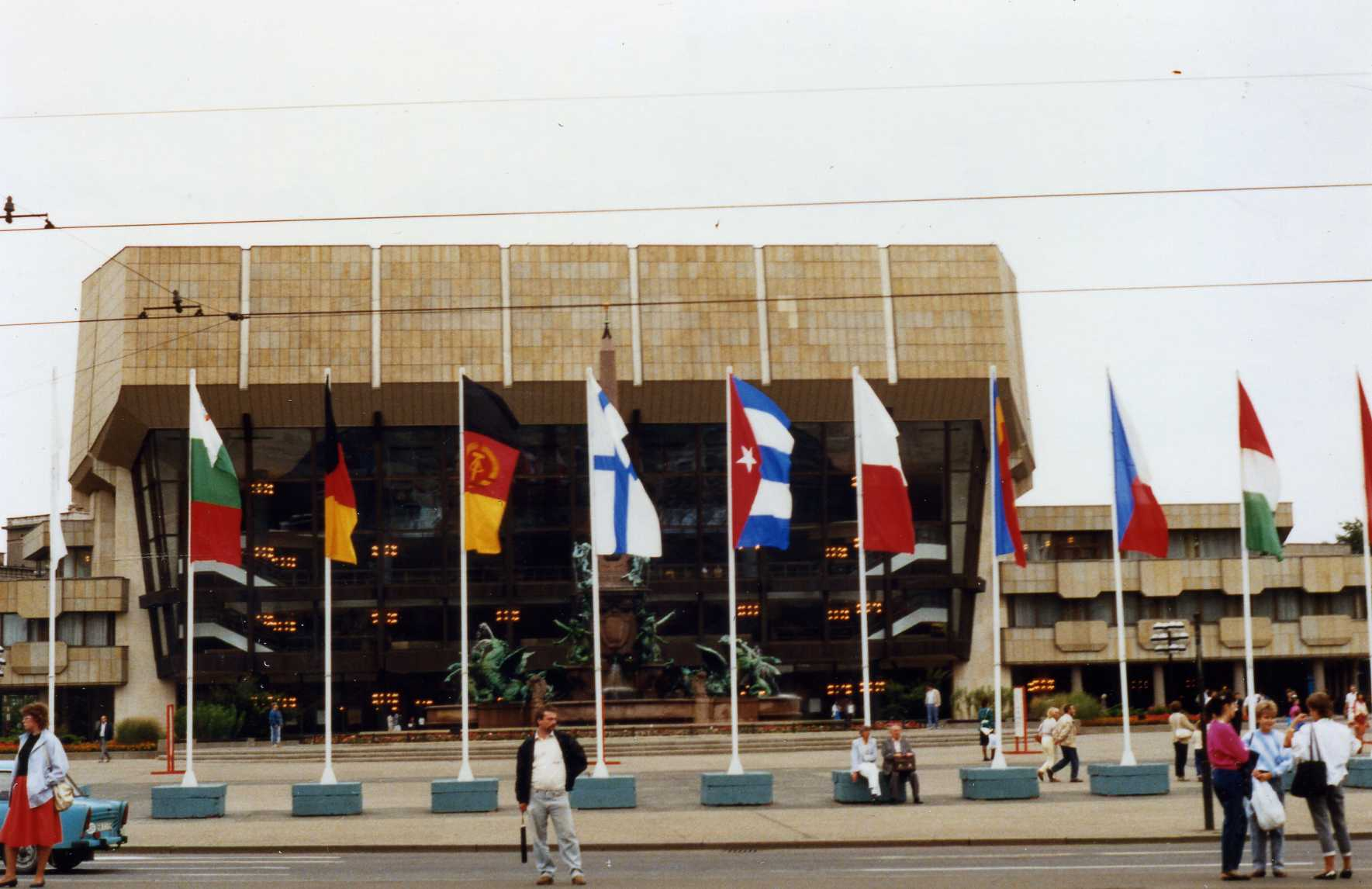
Gewandhaus in 1988

The third, current Gewandhaus, on Augustusplatz and the eastern part of the inner city ring road, opened on 8 October 1981, 200 years after the Leipzig Gewandhaus Orchestra moved into the original hall. Conductor Kurt Masur laid the foundation stone on 8 November 1977. The architect was Rudolf Skoda, who like Dauthe was a native of Leipzig. The design carefully took into consideration its precedents' reputation for excellent acoustics. During construction, the hall was filled several times with soldiers of the East German Nationale Volksarmee to test its sound quality at full capacity.

During the Autumn of Nations in 1989, the Gewandhaus became a platform for political dissent against the Communist authorities, as Masur opened up the hall for public discussion on the future and reform of the GDR (the so-called "Gewandhaus Talks").

Today's Gewandhaus has a seating capacity of 1,900 and features a Schuke concert organ with 6,845 pipes.

== Gallery ==
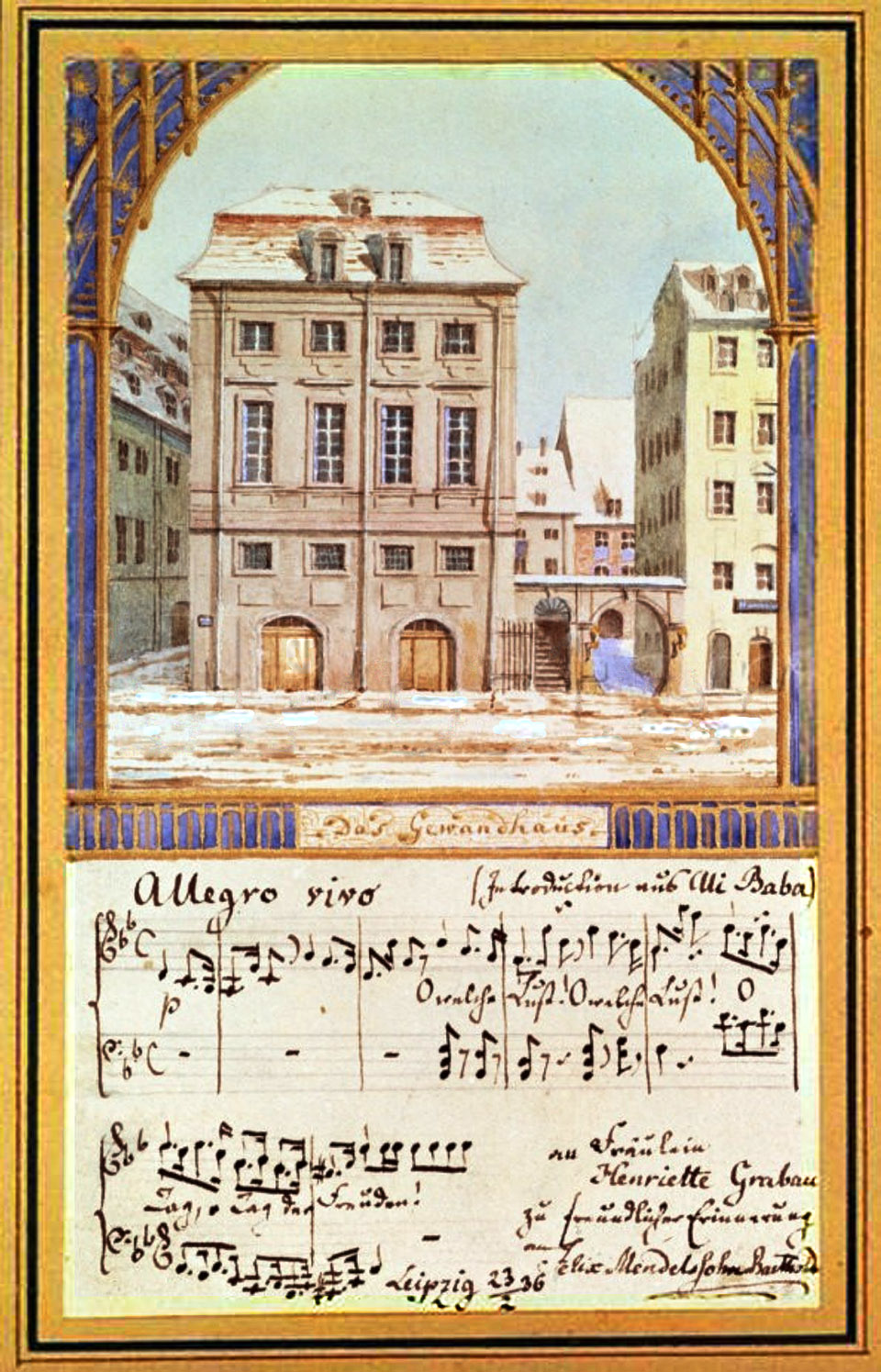
First Gewandhaus (1781). Watercolour by Felix Mendelssohn, with some lines from the opera Ali Baba by Luigi Cherubini, presented to Henriette Grabau-Bünau, principal singer of the Gewandhaus, to mark Mendelssohn's inaugural concert there on 4 October 1835.

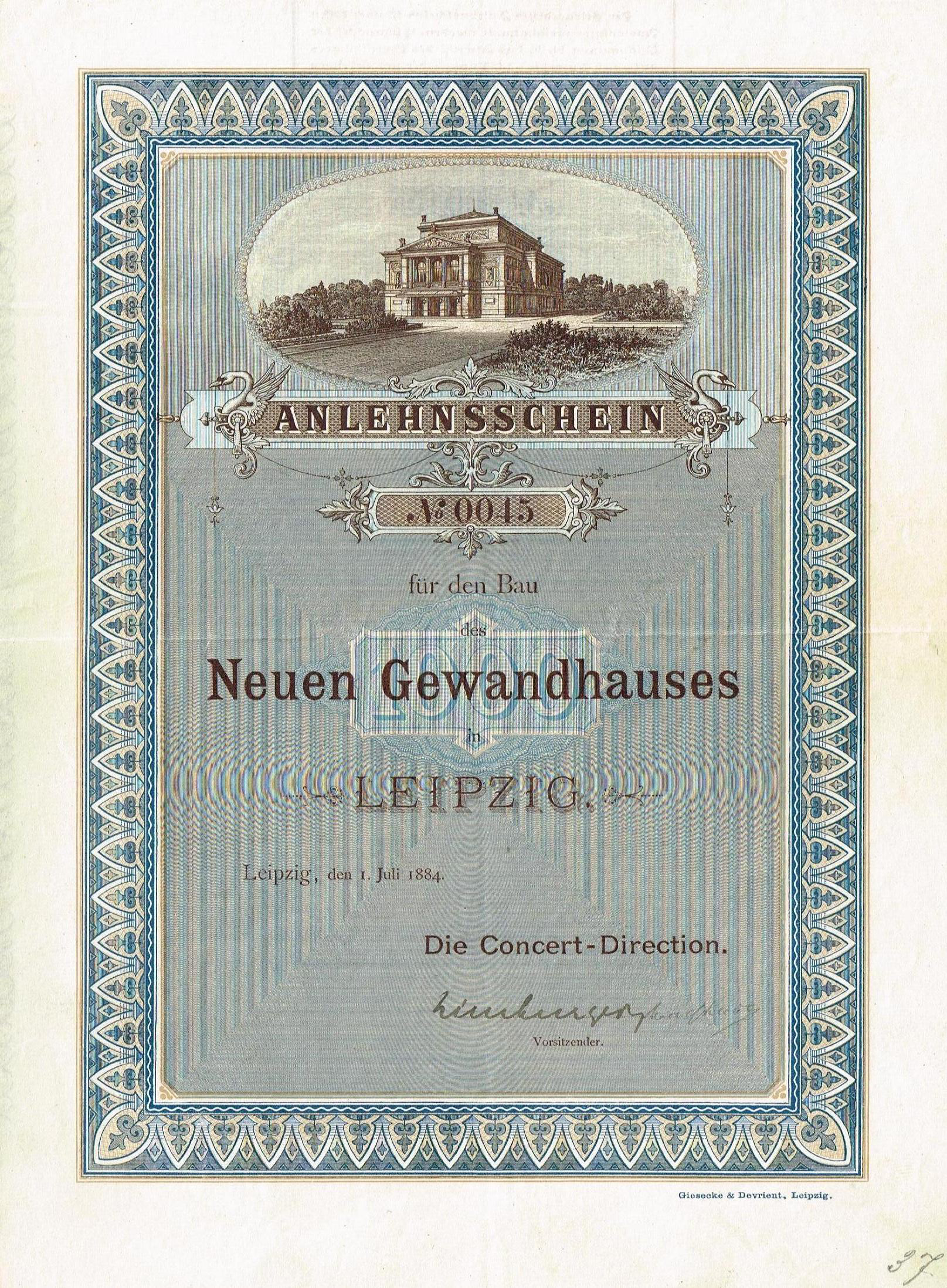
Bond for the funding of the second Gewandhaus in Leipzig, issued 1 July 1884 by Giesecke+Devrient.

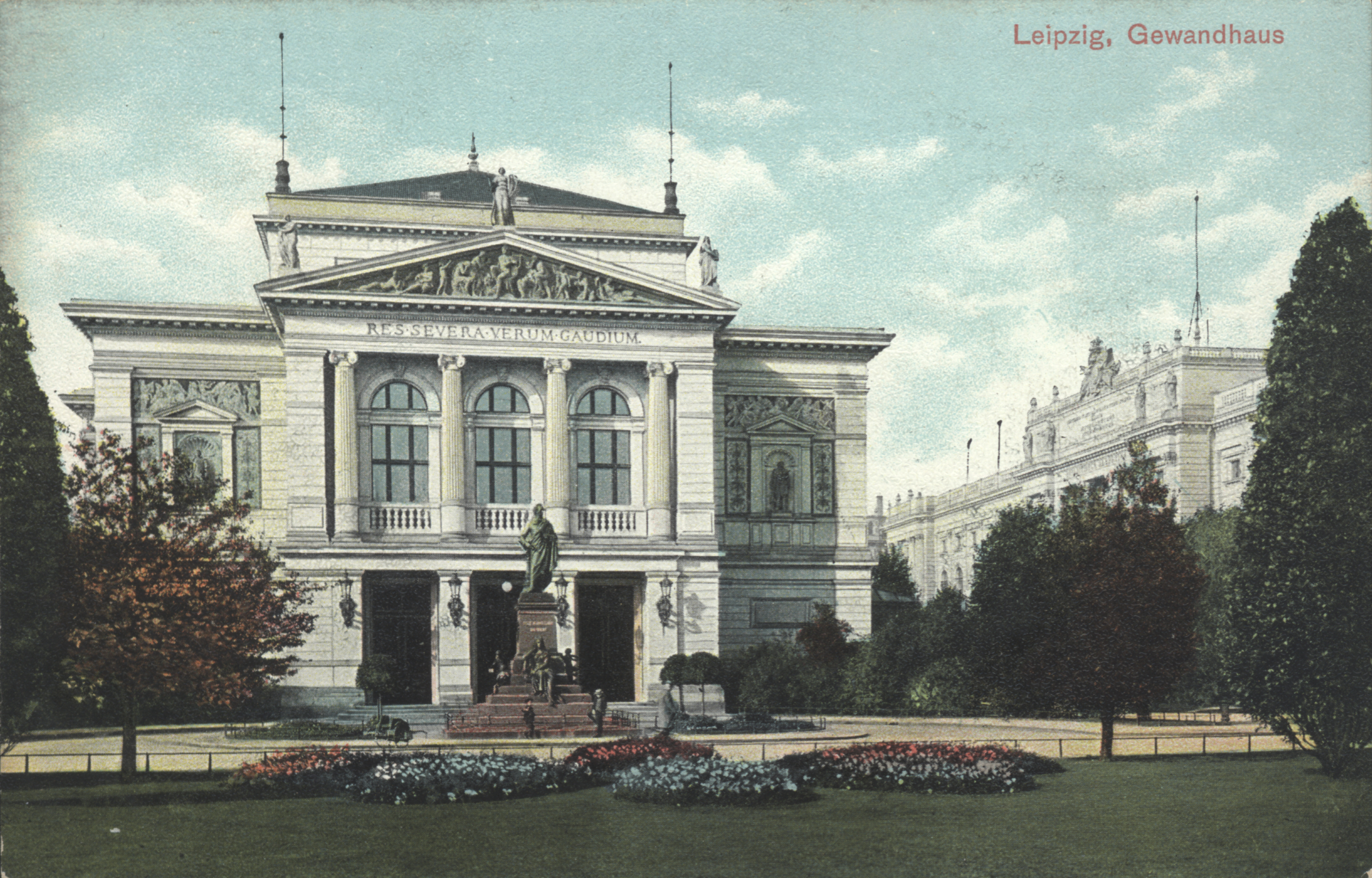
Second Gewandhaus (c. 1910), built to replace the first, which was renovated and repurposed. Severely damaged in two separate air raids on 4 December 1943 and 20 February 1944 during the bombing of Leipzig in World War II. Ruins demolished in 1968.

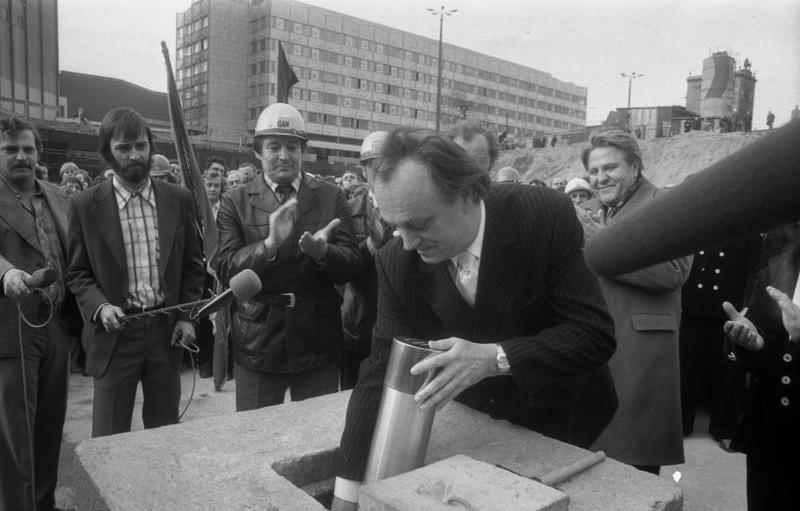
Kurt Masur lays the foundation stone of the current Gewandhaus, 8 November 1977. Behind him is East German Minister for Culture Hans-Joachim Hoffmann.

== See also ==
- Architecture of Leipzig#New Gewandhaus

== Sources ==
- Leo Beranek, Concert Halls and Opera Houses: Musics, Acoustics, and Architecture, Springer, 2004, page 280. ISBN 0-387-95524-0.
