= Zum Arabischen Coffe Baum =

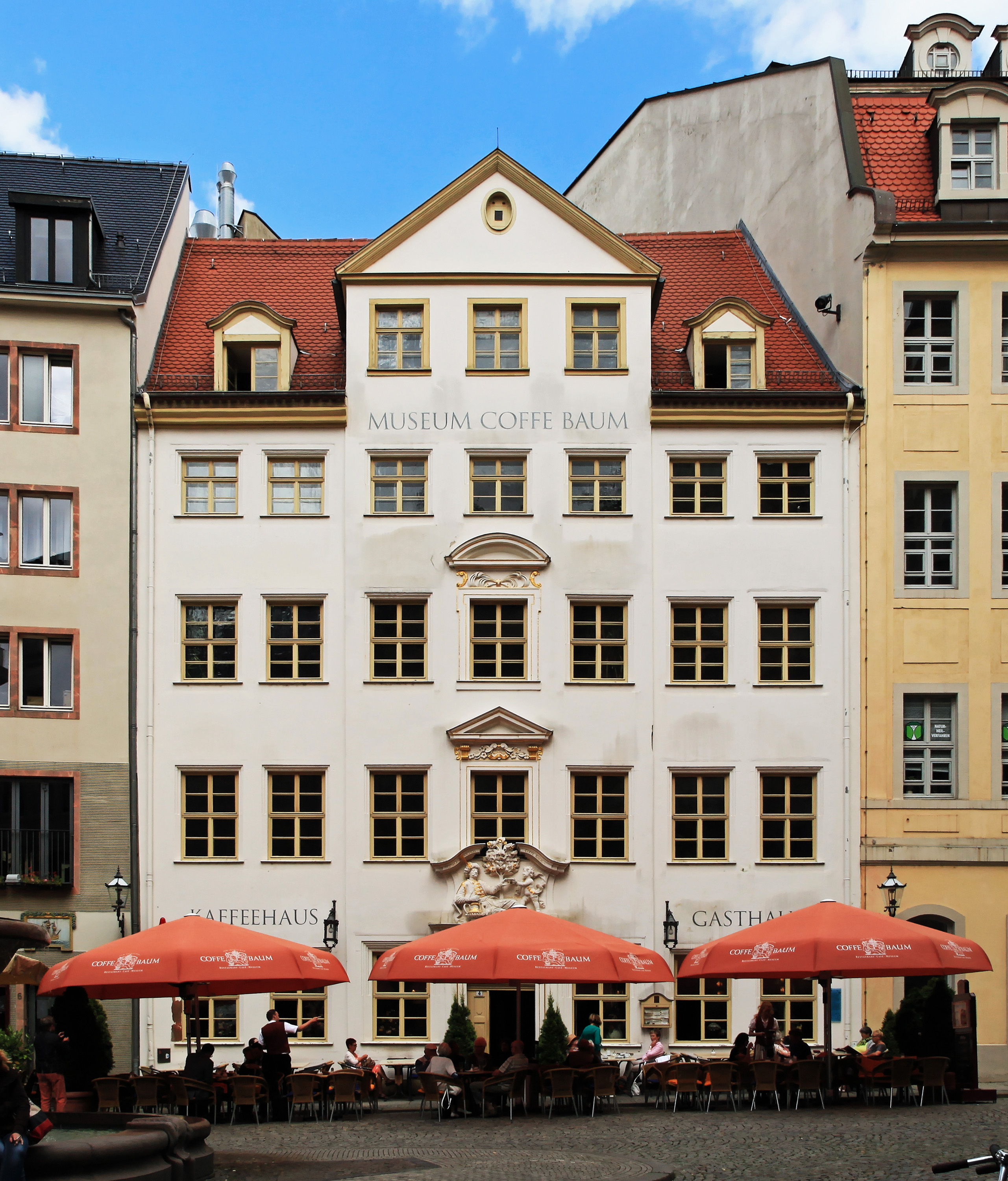
- The Arabian Coffee Tree Building in 2015
- Interactive map of the Zum Arabischen Coffe Baum area

General information
- Architectural style: Renaissance, Baroque
- Location: Kleine Fleischergasse 4, 04109 Leipzig, Germany
- Coordinates: 51°20′28″N 12°22′23″E
- Year built: before 1556
- Renovated: 1718/1719 in baroque style, 1993-1998, 2020-2025
- Owner: City of Leipzig

Other information
- Public transit: Leipzig Markt station of S-Bahn Mitteldeutschland

Website
- https://coffebaum.de/

Zum Arabischen Coffe Baum (in English: Arabian Coffee Tree) is a coffeehouse and museum in Leipzig, Germany. It is a listed building in the German state of Saxony. Coffee has been served here since 1711. This makes it one of Europe's oldest continuously operated coffee taverns, along with Café Procope in Paris. Numerous celebrities visited the restaurant regularly, for example, Robert Schumann (1810–1856) and his Davidsbündler met for the regulars' table in the "Arabian Coffee Tree" from 1833 onwards. Since the end of December 2018, it has been closed for renovation work. In April 2025, it was reopened for guests after renovation work at a cost of 3.8 million euros.

== Name ==
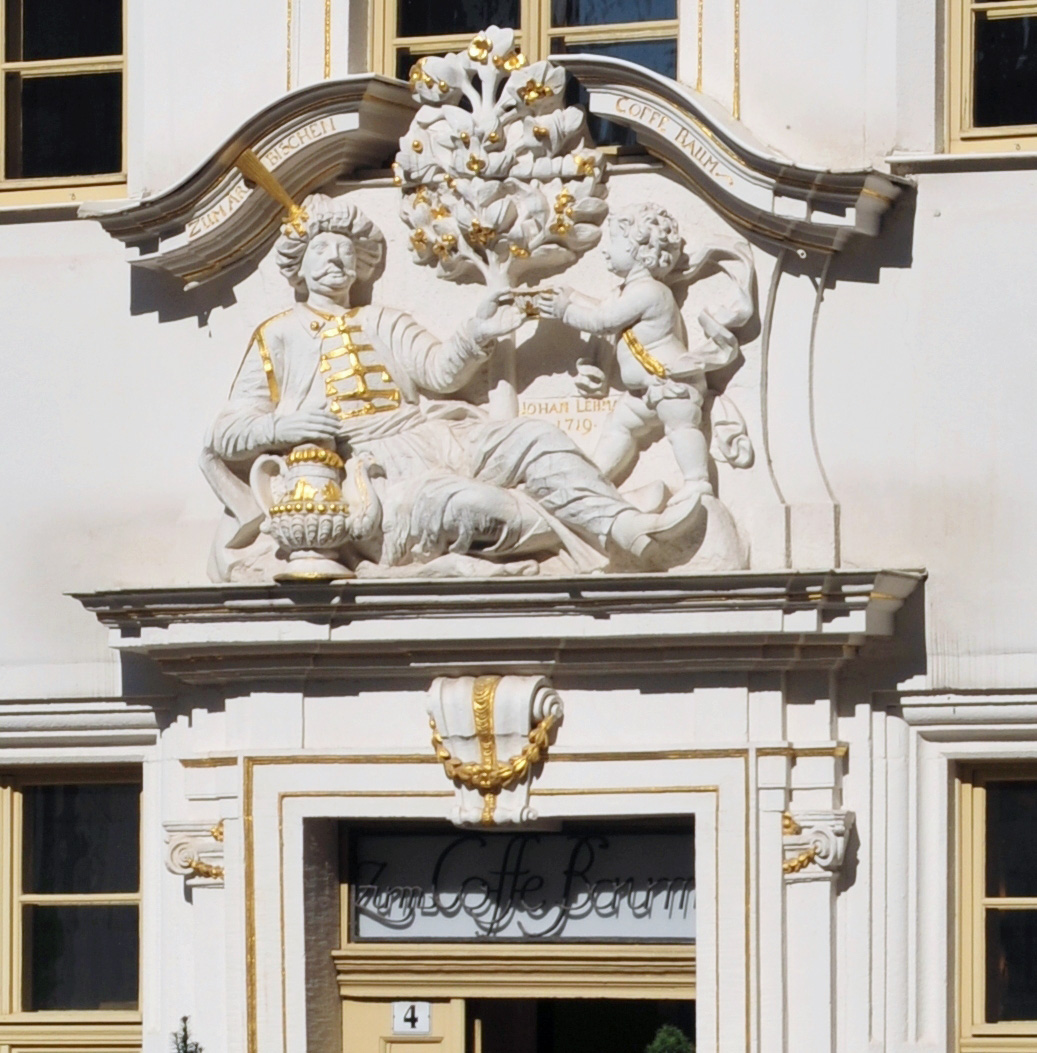
Sculpture above the portal (2009)

The name "Zum Arabischen Kaffeebaum" appears in the Leipzig address book in 1914. In the description of Leipzig in 1799, written by Friedrich Gottlob Leonhardi, the house is simply called "Kaffeebaum". The name's origin is a scenic sculpture above the portal. It shows somebody looking like an Arab or an historic Ottoman handing a bowl of coffee to a putto. The house sign thus symbolizes the history of coffee as a cultural gift from the Orient to the Occident. A flowering coffee tree bursts the roof on which the name of the café is written. An inscription reads Johan Lehmann | 1719. The sculptor is believed to have been Balthasar Permoser's pupil Johann Benjamin Thomae (1682–1751).

== Museum ==
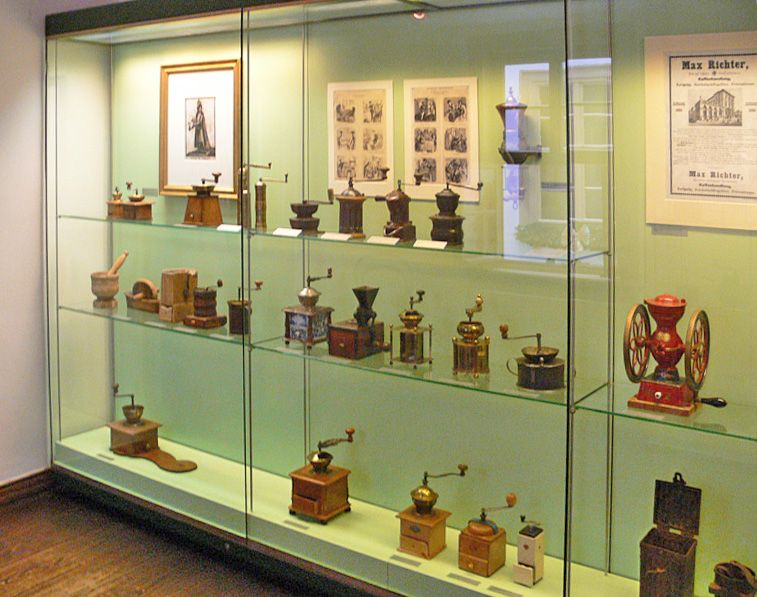
Inside the museum (2007)

The museum, as a facility of the Leipzig City History Museum, presents exhibits from 300 years of Saxon history of coffee culture in 16 rooms on the second and third floors, e.g. coffee grinders, Meissen coffee porcelain, coffee cups, coffee roasting equipment and coffee preparation vessels, supplemented by sound and film documents as well as past and present things about coffee as a pleasure and cliché, as a colonial good, as an explosive scarce commodity in communist East Germany and as a global commodity. During the renovation from the end of 2018, the museum was also closed, but on 1 July 2025, it was reopened with a conceptually revised design.

== Other prominent guests ==
- Augustus II the Strong
- Georg Ph. Telemann
- Johann S. Bach
- Johann C. Gottsched
- Christian F. Gellert
- Gotthold E. Lessing
- Johann W. Goethe
- Napoleon Bonaparte
- E. T. A. Hoffmann
- Franz Liszt
- Richard Wagner
- August Bebel
- Edvard Grieg
- Max Klinger
- Gustav Mahler
- Paul Lincke
- Franz Lehár
- Hans Albers
- Heinrich George
- Max Schwimmer
- Günther Ramin
- Erich Kästner
- Heinz Rühmann
- Johannes Heesters
- Kurt Masur
- Udo Jürgens
- Horst Köhler
- Gerhard Schröder
- Liza Minnelli
- Bill Clinton
- Otto Waalkes
- Mario Adorf
- Maximilian Schell

== Leipzig Music Trail ==
The House The Arabian Coffee Tree is part of the UNESCO initiative Leipziger Notenspur (Leipzig Music Trail).
