= Wilhelm Friedrich Riem =

German composer and conductor (1779–1857)

Wilhelm Friedrich Riem (17 February 1779 – 20 April 1857) was a German composer and conductor.

== Life ==
Born in Kölleda, Riem was the son of a lawyer. Just ten years old, without having had any lessons worth mentioning, he already performed as a piano player in Jena. He was able to attend the Thomasschule zu Leipzig and was a pupil of Johann Adam Hiller there, but became an orphan at an early age and studied law at the request of his grandfather. Hiller is said to have encouraged him to devote himself to music again after his law exams. He became solo pianist in the Gewandhausorchester in Leipzig. His opus 1, which was published in 1804, is said to have caused a sensation through its originality. He worked as an organist and later as director of the Leipziger Singakademie, founded in 1802, and in 1807 as organist at the Reformierte Kirche (Leipzig). His pupils included among others Henriette Grabau-Bünau, the daughter of the Bremen organist Lebrecht Grabau, with whom Riem also worked.

In 1814, Riem succeeded Justus Theophilus (Theodorus) Rauschelbach as organist at the Bremen Cathedral. At the beginning of his term of office he had the organ rebuilt and enriched with romantic voices to achieve a stronger fundamental tone. In 1815, he founded the Bremer Singakademie with other music lovers, and was generally also its conductor (cathedral cantor) until his death. In 1820, he founded the 'Bremer Concert-Orchester', which became the 'Staatsorchester Bremen'. In 1825, he took over the direction of the performances when the "Verein für Privat-Conzerte" was founded, which made it one of the first civic orchestras in Germany. In 1895, the "Verein für Privat-Conzerte" became the "Philharmonische Gesellschaft". Riem was also given the task of music director of the municipal orchestra and that of a music teacher at the Bremer Lehrerseminar. Through his functions he became a central figure in the musical life of Bremen.

In 1856, he received an honorary doctorate from the Leipzig University.

Riem died in Bremen at the age of 77.

For his tomb, the sculptor Diedrich Samuel Kropp designed a free-standing large sandstone figure as a "muse of mourning" in the shape of Saint Cecilia.

== Work ==
Since 1804, many of his sonnets, cantatas and quartets have been published. His late work, the oratorio Der Erlöser was not premiered until after his death. A complete edition of his organ compositions was published by Körner in Erfurt.

- Unser Vater, early romantic a cappella composition
- Ehre sei Gott
- Der Erlöser, Oratorio
