= Lowbrow =

Lowbrow may refer to:

- Lowbrow, relating to, or suitable for a person with little taste or intellectual interest, the converse of highbrow
- Lowbrow, forms of entertainment that are unsophisticated, i.e. not difficult or requiring much intelligence to be understood
- Lowbrow (art movement), describes an underground visual art movement that arose in the Los Angeles, California, area in the late 1970s
- Low culture, a derogatory term for some forms of popular culture
- Lowbrow, the original title of the pilot of the Cartoon Network series Megas XLR
- Danger: Low Brow, a radio comedy show from Melbourne aired from 1985 to 1991
- Low comedy, a form of unsophisticated entertainment

== See also ==
- Highbrow, synonymous with intellectual
- Middlebrow, describes both a certain type of easily accessible art, often literature, as well as the population that uses art to acquire culture and class that is usually unattainable
