= Davidsbündlertänze =

Piano pieces by Robert Schumann

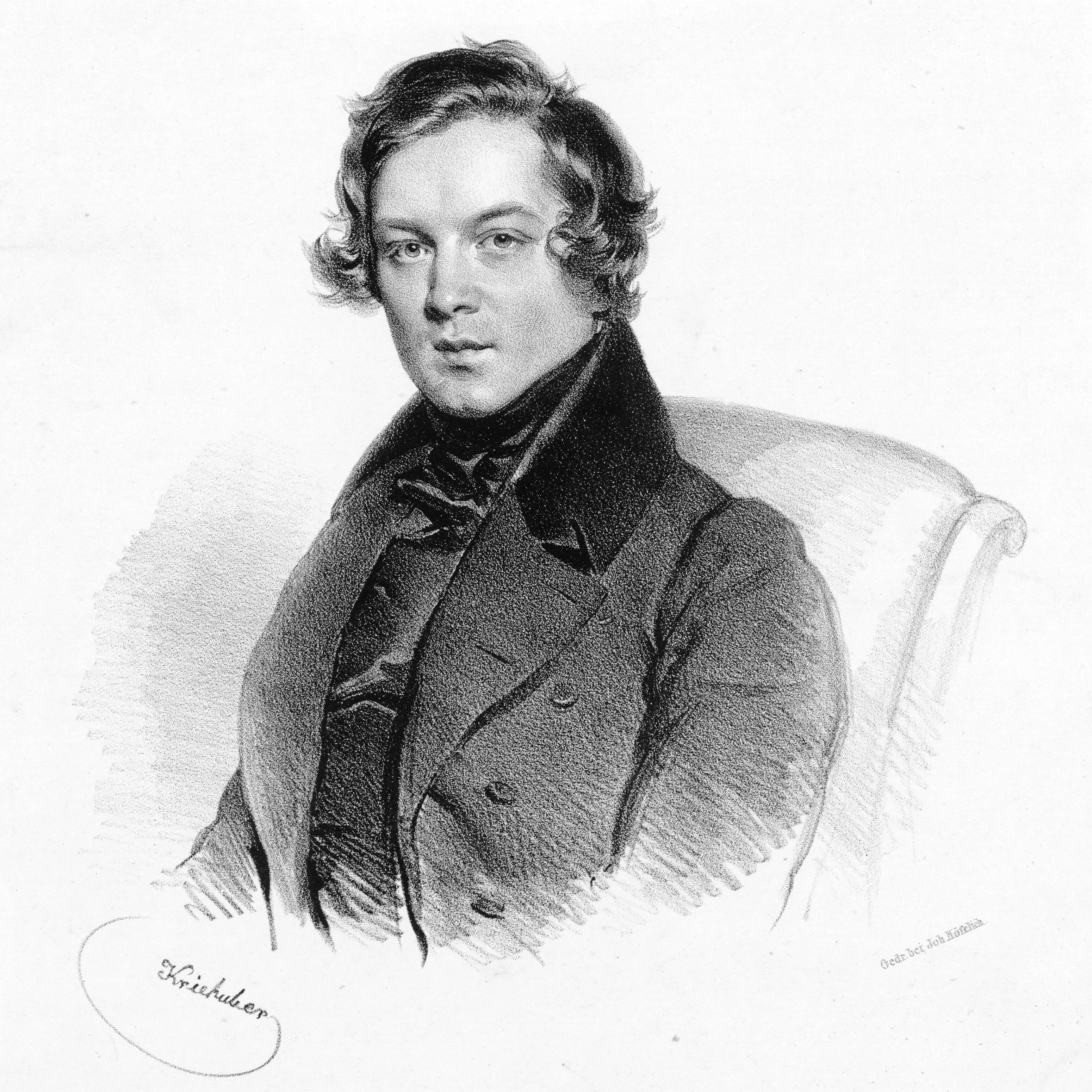
Robert Schumann in 1839

Davidsbündlertänze (Dances of the League of David), Op. 6, is a group of eighteen pieces for piano composed in 1837 by Robert Schumann, who named them after his music society Davidsbündler. The low opus number is misleading: the work was written after Carnaval, Op. 9, and the Symphonic Studies, Op. 13.

== Background ==
Robert Schumann's early piano works were substantially influenced by his relationship with Clara Wieck. On September 5, 1839, Schumann wrote to his former professor: "She was practically my sole motivation for writing the Davidsbündlertänze, the Concerto, the Sonata and the 'Novelettes'." They are an expression of his passionate love, anxieties, longings, visions, dreams and fantasies.

The theme of the Davidsbündlertänze is based on a mazurka by Clara Wieck. The intimate character pieces are his most personal work. In 1838, Schumann told Clara that the Dances contained "many wedding thoughts" and that "the story is an entire Polterabend (German wedding eve party, during which old crockery is smashed to bring good luck)".

The pieces are not true dances, but characteristic pieces, musical dialogues about contemporary music between Schumann's characters Florestan and Eusebius. These respectively represent the impetuous and the lyrical, poetic sides of Schumann's nature. Each piece is ascribed to one or both of them. Their names follow the first piece and the appropriate initial or initials follow each of the others except the sixteenth (which leads directly into the seventeenth, the ascription for which applies to both) and the ninth and eighteenth, which are respectively preceded by the following remarks: "Here Florestan made an end, and his lips quivered painfully", and "Quite superfluously Eusebius remarked as follows: but all the time great bliss spoke from his eyes."

In the second edition of the work, Schumann removed these ascriptions and remarks and the Tänze from the title, as well as making various alterations, including the addition of some repeats. The first edition is generally favored, though some readings from the second are often used. The suite ends with the striking of twelve low Cs to signify the coming of midnight.

Peter Kaminsky has analysed the structure of the work in detail.

The first edition is preceded by the following epigraph:

Alter Spruch
In all und jeder Zeit
Verknüpft sich Lust und Leid:
Bleibt fromm in Lust und seid
Dem Leid mit Mut bereit

Old saying
In each and every age
joy and sorrow are mingled:
Remain pious in joy,
and be ready for sorrow with courage.

== Sections ==
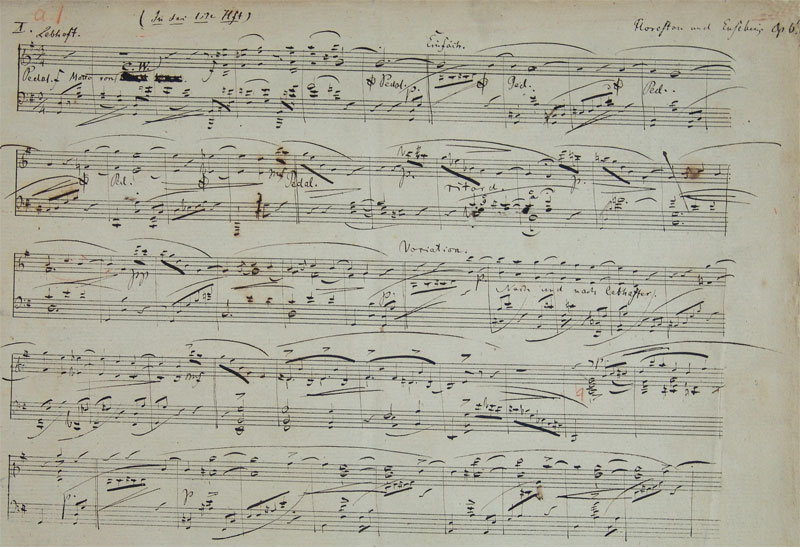
First page the autograph of “Davidsbündlertänze”, Op. 6.

The individual pieces, unnamed, have the following tempo markings, keys and ascriptions:

1. Lebhaft: Lively (Vivace), G major, Florestan and Eusebius;
2. Innig: Intimately (Con intimo sentimento), B minor, Eusebius;
3. Etwas hahnbüchen: Somewhat clumsily (Un poco impetuoso) (1st edition), Mit Humor: With humor (Con umore) (2nd edition), G major, Florestan (hahnbüchen, now usually hanebüchen or hagebüchen, is an untranslatable colloquialism roughly meaning "coarse" or "clumsy". Ernest Hutcheson translated it as "cockeyed" in his book The Literature of the Piano.);
4. Ungeduldig: Impatiently (Con impazienza), B minor, Florestan;
5. Einfach: Simply (Semplice), D major, Eusebius;
6. Sehr rasch und in sich hinein: Very quickly and inwardly (Molto vivo, con intimo fervore) (1st edition), Sehr rasch: Very quickly (Molto vivo) (2nd edition), D minor, Florestan;
7. Nicht schnell mit äußerst starker Empfindung: Not fast, with very great feeling (Non presto profondamente espressivo) (1st edition), Nicht schnell: Not fast (Non presto) (2nd edition), G minor, Eusebius;
8. Frisch: Freshly (Con freschezza), C minor, Florestan;
9. No tempo indication (metronome mark of ♩ = 126) (1st edition), Lebhaft: Lively (Vivace) (2nd edition), C major, Florestan;
10. Balladenmäßig sehr rasch: Balladically very fast (Alla ballata molto vivo) (1st edition), ("Sehr" and "Molto" capitalized in 2nd edition), D minor (ends major), Florestan;
11. Einfach: Simply (Semplice), B minor–D major, Eusebius;
12. Mit Humor: With humor (Con umore), B minor–E minor and major, Florestan;
13. Wild und lustig: Wildly and merrily (Selvaggio e gaio), B minor and major, Florestan and Eusebius;
14. Zart und singend: Tenderly and singing (Dolce e cantando), E♭ major, Eusebius;
15. Frisch: Freshly (Con freschezza), B♭ major – Etwas bewegter: With agitation (poco piu mosso), E♭ major with a return to the opening section (with the option to go round the piece once more), Florestan and Eusebius;
16. Mit gutem Humor: With good humor (Con buon umore) (in 2nd edition, "Con umore"), G major – Etwas langsamer: A little slower (Un poco più lento), B minor; leading without a break into
17. Wie aus der Ferne: As if from afar (Come da lontano), B major and minor (including a full reprise of No. 2), Florestan and Eusebius; and finally,
18. Nicht schnell: Not fast (Non presto), C major, Eusebius.
