= Davidsbündler =

Music society promoting contemporary music

The Davidsbündler (League of David) was a fictitious musical society created by German Romantic composer Robert Schumann and exposed in his writings. It was inspired by literary societies, real and imagined, such as the Serapionsbrüder (The Serapion Brethren) of ETA Hoffmann, however as Richard Taruskin noted, the concept was most realized in Schumann's reviews of his fellow composers and their aesthetic styles. The illusory group was created to defend the cause of contemporary music against its detractors, which Schumann routinely referred to as philistines.

== Makeup ==
The imagined "league" comprised mainly the warring identities within Schumann, namely Florestan, Raro, and Eusebius, respectively symbolising the extroverted and introspective sides of his personality. The purpose of this group, however, was, expressed in Schumann's words in 1854, "In order to express different views on art, it seems appropriate to invent contrasting artistic characters."

Taruskin corresponds these three aspects in Freudian terminology, namely id (Florestan), ego (Eusebius), and superego (Raro). However, the characters also revolved around Schumann's aesthetic wrestling with the more exploratory and dramatic elements of the Romantic style. He routinely disparaged his contemporaries for their philistine traditionality, and the disapproved elements of liberated Romanticism in the case of Franz Liszt and Richard Wagner. Both Wagner and Schumann were avid reviewers during their time and views held by them radiated throughout German cultural life.

Members of the "league" also included wife and composer/pianist Clara Schumann, supportive of Schumann's "league," as well as favored composers Niccolò Paganini and Frederic Chopin. Other members of this group included his piano teacher Friedrich Wieck. The minor composer Franz Otto, brother of choral composer Ernst Otto, was also invited to join the "league." In a quotation from 1833, the purpose of the group is made clear through Schumann's address to Otto,

I expect Wieck has told you that a new musical periodical is coming out, which is to be the representative of poetry, and will mercilessly attack all the weaknesses of the age...Of course, you help us in a passive sense as it is, by writing, but beside that we require active criticism to make victory quite certain.

— Robert Schumann, in a letter to Franz Otto in 1833, quoted in The Musical Times (1888)

== Appearance ==
The name "Davidsbündler" already appears in Schumann's first musical essay, "The Davidsbündler", which was published in Karl Herloßsohn’s newspaper Der Komet (The Comet) in December 1833. Its narrator finds a paper shred thrown out of a window by a "Swedish head with a crooked nose" bearing the following message on its back side:

"Finder! To the Good and to the Great you have been chosen! Davidsbündler you shall become, [you shall] translate the secrets of the Society of the World, i.e. of the society, which shall swat the Philistines, musical and otherwise! Here you know all – take action then! By no means organize provincially however, but deliver wildly and crazily! Master Raro, Florestan, Eusebius, Friedrich, Bg., St., Hf., Knif, bellows treader at St. Georg."

The continuation of this "Davidsbündler" fantasizing can be found in the Neue Zeitschrift für Musik, which Schumann founded in April 1834. The first essay on the subject was entitled, "The Davidsbündler," published in 1833 with the second one being published the year after. The first republication of the essays occurred in 1883 by Frederich Gustav Jansen, a German organist and musicologist.

In the same year 1834 Schumann composed three pieces carrying the titles "Florestan", "Eusebius" and "Marche des Davidsbündler contre les Philistins" in his Carnaval.

In 1837 Schumann wrote a piano suite, Davidsbündlertänze, Op. 6, named after the Davidsbündler and translated as, "Dances of the members of the League of David." In the first edition, the dances were signed by the different characters and were additionally accompanied with short excerpts on their individual personalities. However, by the second edition such elements were noticeably absent.

It is also significant that in Schumann's 1854 publication, Collected Writings about Music and Musicians, the "league" is not mentioned, and is absent from any type of mentioning, yet the core ideas within the framework are evident throughout the works in the word "Davidsbündlerschaft."

== Works ==
Within Schumann's body of works, certain ones featured the "League of David" and its constituent characters:

- Papillons (Op.2)
- Davidsbündlertänze (Op.6)
- Carnaval (Op.9)
- Fantasiestücke (Op.12)
- Kreisleriana (Op.16)

== Tributes ==
- Theodor Kirchner, a close associate of Clara and Robert Schumann, piad homage to Schumann's set in his Neue Davidsbündlertänze, op. 17 (1874).
- Erika Fox composed her Davidsbündler Lieder for flute and piano in 1999.
