= Piano trio repertoire =

Set of available musical works for piano trio

Among the fairly large repertoire for the standard piano trio (violin, cello, and piano) are the following works:

Ordering is by surname of composer.

== A ==
- Els Aarne
  - Piano Trio (1946)
- Francesca D'Adda
  - Trio per pianoforte, violino e violoncello (1842)
- Hans Abrahamsen
  - Traumlieder (2009)
- Samuel Adler
  - Piano Trio (1964)
  - Piano Trio No. 2 (1978)
- Kati Agócs
  - Piano Trio No. 1, Queen of Hearts (2017)
- Miguel del Águila
  - Tango Trio (2002)
  - Disagree! (2017)
  - Japanese Gardens (1996)
  - Boundaries 2 (2002)
  - Doppler Effect, version for violin, cello, piano (2005)
  - Images (rev. 2008)
  - Lullaby for Piano Trio (v. 2008)
  - Musescapes (2009)
  - A Golden Celebration (2014)
- Franco Alfano
  - Concerto for violin, cello and piano (1932)
- Franghiz Ali-Zadeh
  - Impromptus (2004)
- Charles-Valentin Alkan
  - Piano Trio in G minor, Op. 30 (1841)
- Berta Alves de Sousa
  - Piano Trio (1974)
- Alexander Alyabyev
  - Piano Trio in E♭ major in one movement (1812)
  - Piano Trio in A minor (1820)
- Fikret Amirov
  - To the Memory of Ghadsibekov, second version, poem for violin, cello and piano (1953)
- Andrew Anderson
  - Piano Trio in E minor: "The Heart" (2013)
- Volkmar Andreae
  - Piano Trio No. 1, Op. 1 (1899)
  - Piano Trio No. 2 in E♭ major, Op. 14
- Elfrida Andrée
  - Piano Trio No.1 in C minor (1860)
  - Piano Trio No.2 in G minor (1884)
- Iosif Andriasov
  - Trio for violin, cello and piano, Op. 7 (1957)
- George Antheil
  - Trio (1950)
- Georges Aperghis
  - Trio (2012)
- Violet Archer
  - Piano Trio No. 1 (1954)
  - Piano Trio No. 2 (1957)
- Anton Arensky
  - Piano Trio No. 1 in D minor, Op. 32 (1894)
  - Piano Trio No. 2 in F minor, Op. 73 (1905)
- Cecilia Arizti
  - Chamber Trio for piano, violin and cello (1893)
- Malcolm Arnold
  - Piano Trio, Op. 54 (1956)
- Claude Arrieu
  - Piano Trio (1957)
- Lera Auerbach
  - Piano Trio, Op. 28 (1992–1996)
  - Postlude, encore piece for piano trio (2006)
  - Piano Trio No. 2, Triptych - This Mirror Has Three Faces (2012)
  - Piano Trio No. 3 (2013)
  - Piano Trio (2017)
- Ernest Austin
  - Piano Trio No. 1
  - Piano Trio No. 2, In Field and Forest, Op. 15 (c. 1908)
  - Piano Trio No. 3
  - Piano Trio No. 4 in D major, Op. 26 (c. 1909)
  - Piano Trio No. 5, Folk Tune Fantasy, Op. 65

== B ==
- Arno Babadzhanyan
  - Piano Trio in F♯ minor (1953)
- Carl Philipp Emanuel Bach
  - 13 keyboard trios (violin, cello, fortepiano) Wq.89 #1-6, Wq.90 #1-4 and Wq.91 #1-3 (H.522-534) (1775-77)
- Vera Baeva
  - Piano Trio (1986)
- Judith Bailey
  - Microminiature for Piano Trio No. 1, Op. 68 (2000)
- David N. Baker
  - Contrasts (1976) for violin, violoncello, and piano
  - Roots (1976) for violin, violoncello, and piano
  - Roots II (1992) for violin, violoncello, and piano
- Jeanne Barbillion
  - Piano Trio (1928)
- Woldemar Bargiel
  - Piano Trio No. 1 in F major, Op. 6 (1851)
  - Piano Trio No. 2 in E♭ major, Op. 20 (1860)
  - Piano Trio No. 3 in B♭ major, Op. 37 (1870)
- Vytautas Barkauskas
  - Modus vivendi, Op. 108 (1996)
- Ethel Barns
  - Piano Trio No. 1 in F minor (1904)
  - Piano Trio No. 2
  - Fantasy Trio for 2 Violins and Piano, Op. 26 (1912)
- Bela Bartók
  - Contrasts for Clarinet, Violin & Piano (1938)
- Mason Bates
  - String Band for violin, cello, and prepared piano (2002)
- Roland Batik (b. August 19, 1951)
  - Four Intermezzi for Piano Trio
- René-Emmanuel Baton
  - Trio for piano, violin and cello, Op. 31 (1924)
- Arnold Bax
  - Piano Trio in B♭ major (1946)
- Amy Beach
  - Piano Trio in A minor, Op. 150 (1938)
- Sally Beamish
  - Piobaireachd for Piano Trio (1991)
  - The Seafarer Trio for Narrator and Piano Trio (2000)
  - Carnival Samba for Piano Trio (2003)
  - La Mer, Debussy arranged for Piano Trio (2013-2015)
  - Dance the Beginning of the World for Piano Trio (2017)
- Janet Beat
  - Piano Trio (2007-2009)
- Ludwig van Beethoven
  - Piano Trio in E♭, WoO. 38 (1791, published 1830)
  - Allegretto in B♭ major WoO. 39 (1791, published 1830)
  - Piano Trios Nos. 1-3 (E♭ major, G major, C minor), Op. 1 (1795)
  - Piano Trio No. 4 in B♭ major (alternate version of the trio for clarinet, violoncello and piano), Op. 11 (1798)
  - Piano Trio (arrangement - with Beethoven's approval, possibly by him - of the second symphony in D major, Op. 36)
  - Piano Trio (arrangement of Septet in E♭ major, Op. 20), Op. 38 (1805)
  - Variations for Piano Trio in E♭ major, Op. 44 (1792)
  - Piano Trio (arrangement of string quintet in E♭ major, Op.4), Op. 63 (1806)
  - 2 Piano Trios (D major "Ghost", E♭ major), Op. 70 (1809)
  - Piano Trio No. 7 in B♭ major "Archduke", Op. 97 (1816)
  - Kakadu Variations for Piano Trio in G major, Op. 121a (1803)
- Alan Beggerow
  - Piano Trio No. 3
- Leonard Bernstein
  - Piano Trio (1937)
- Louise Bertin
  - Piano Trio in B♭ major, Op. 10 (1875)
- Henri Bertini (28 October 1798 – 30 September 1876)
  - Trio pour piano, violon, et basse, no 1, Op. 20
  - Trio pour piano, violon, et basse, no 2, Op. 21
  - Trio pour piano, violon, et basse, no 3, Op. 22
  - Grand Trio for piano, violin and cello Op.43
  - Grand Trio for piano, violin and cello Op.48
  - Trio pour piano, violon, et basse, Op. 70
- Franz Berwald
  - Piano Trio in C (1845)
  - Piano Trio No. 1 in E♭ (1849)
  - Piano Trio No. 2 in F minor (1851)
  - Piano Trio No. 3 in D minor (1851)
  - Piano Trio No. 4 in C major (1853)
- Judith Bingham
  - Chapman's Pool (1997)
- Richard Birchall
  - Contours (2014)
- Renate Birnstein
  - Les formules magiques (1998/1999)
- Harrison Birtwistle
  - Trio (2010)
- Chester Biscardi
  - Trio (1976)
- Leopoldine Blahetka
  - Piano Trio, Op. 5
- Ernest Bloch
  - Three Nocturnes for Piano Trio (1924)
  - Piano Trio (1925)
- Sylvie Bodorová
  - Pre-Visions, Fresques for piano trio (1983)
  - Megiddo for violin, cello and piano (2001)
  - La Speranza for clarinet, cello and piano (1993)
  - Raffiche di vento for flute, viola and cello (2009)
  - Vallja e malit - Dancing Mountain for violin, clarinet and piano (2017)
- Léon Boëllmann
  - Piano Trio in G major, Op. 19 (1895)
- Victoria Bond
  - Trio: Other Selves (1979)
- Mel Bonis
  - Suite orientale for Piano Trio, Op. 48 (1900)
  - Soir, matin for Piano Trio, Op. 76 (1907)
- Prach Boondiskulchok
  - Night Suite (2014)
- Alexander Borodin
  - Piano Trio in D major (1850-1860 [3 movements only, last movement lost])
- Edith Borroff
  - Piano Trio (1983)
- Sergei Bortkiewicz
  - Trio for piano, violin and cello, Op. 38 (1928)
- Henriëtte Bosmans
  - Piano Trio (1921)
- Marco Enrico Bossi
  - Trio in D minor, Op. 107 (1896)
  - Trio sinfonico in D major, Op. 123 (1901)
- Lili Boulanger
  - Deux pièces en trio (1918)
- York Bowen
  - Phantasie Trio for Violin, Cello (or Viola) and Piano, Op.24
  - Rhapsody Trio for Violin, Violoncello and Piano in A minor, Op.80 (1926)
  - Trio in 3 Movements in E minor for violin, cello and piano, Op. 118 (1945)
- Johannes Brahms
  - Piano Trio No. 1 in B major, Op. 8 (1854; revised 1891)
  - Piano Trio No. 2 in C major, Op. 87 (1882)
  - Piano Trio No. 3 in C minor, Op. 101 (1886)
  - Piano Trio No. 4 in A major, Op. posth. (debated)
- Charlotte Bray
  - That Crazed Smile (2014)
  - Those Secret Eyes (2014)
- Frank Bridge
  - Phantasie Trio (Piano Trio No. 1) (1907)
  - Piano Trio No. 2, H. 178 (1929)
- Lydia Winsor Brindamour
  - (of the) ether (2019)
- Hans Bronsart von Schellendorff
  - Piano Trio in G minor, Op. 1 (1853?)
- James Francis Brown
  - Piano Trio (2012)
- Max Bruch
  - Piano Trio in C minor, Op.5 (1857)
- Ignaz Brüll
  - Piano Trio in E♭ major, Op.14 (ca. 1872)
- Linda Buckley
  - Galura (2008) for Piano Trio and Electronics
- Eivind Buene
  - Landscape with Ruins (2007)
- Diana Burrell
  - Frieze (2019)
- Adolf Busch
  - Piano Trio No.1 in A minor, Op.15 (1919)
- Ferruccio Busoni
  - Andante with Variations and Scherzo, Op.18a, BV 184 (1881)

== C ==
- Charles Wakefield Cadman
  - Piano Trio, Op.56 (1908–1913)
- Joseph Callaerts
  - Piano Trio in A minor, Op.16 (1882)
- Charles Camilleri
  - Piano Trio (2005)
- Matilde Capuis
  - Suite in Miniature
- Cláudio Carneyro
  - Piano Trio, Op. 24, No. 1 (1928-1929)
- Ann Carr-Boyd
  - Combinations for Piano Trio (1973)
- Elliott Carter
  - Epigrams (2012)
- Dinorá de Carvalho
  - Trio No. 1 (1950)
- Alfredo Casella
  - Sonata a Tre (Piano Trio), Op. 62 (1938)
- Gaspar Cassadó
  - Piano Trio in C major (1926/1929)
- Alexis de Castillon
  - Piano Trio No.1 in B♭ major, Op.4 (1865)
  - Piano Trio No.2 in D minor, Op.17 (1873?)
- Eve de Castro-Robinson
  - At water's birth (2008)
- Georgy Catoire
  - Piano Trio in F minor, Op.14 (1900)
- Friedrich Cerha
  - Trio (2005)
- Cécile Chaminade
  - Piano Trio No. 1 in G minor, Op. 11 (1880)
  - Piano Trio No. 2 in A minor, Op. 34 (1886)
- Eric Chasalow
  - Piano Trio No. 1 - Two from Three (1980)
  - Piano Trio No. 2 - Yes, I Really Did (1998)
  - Piano Trio No. 3 - Rock Hill Variations (2022)
- Ernest Chausson
  - Piano Trio in G minor, Op. 3 (1881)
- Gayane Chebotaryan
  - Piano Trio (1945)
- Chen Yi (composer)
  - Tibetan Tunes (2008)
  - Tunes From My Home
- Camille Chevillard
  - Piano Trio in F major, Op. 3 (1884)
- Inga Chinilina
  - Piano Trio (2021)
- Shai Cohen
  - Manifesto (2022)
- Frédéric Chopin
  - Piano Trio in G minor, Op. 8 (1829)
- Hedwige Chrétien
  - Trio en ut mineur pour violon, violoncelle et piano
- Francesco Cilea
  - Piano Trio in D major (ca. 1890)
- Rebecca Clarke
  - Piano Trio (1921)
- Rhona Clarke
  - Dunsandle (1988)
  - Piano Trio No. 2 (2001, rev. 2007)
  - Piano Trio No. 3 (2002)
  - A Different Game, Piano Trio No 4 (2016)
- Ann Cleare
  - Day Two (2006)
  - 93 million miles away (2016)
- Anna Clyne
  - A Thousand Mornings for piano trio (2020)
- Gloria Coates
  - Lyric Suite (1993/1996)
- Reine Colaço Osorio-Swaab
  - Trio for Piano Trio No. 2 (1941)
- Samuel Coleridge-Taylor
  - Piano Trio in E minor (1893)
- Silvia Colosanti
  - Canto rosso per P. (2007)
  - Trio (for violin, cello and piano) (2013)
- Osvaldo Coluccino
  - Lasciato (for violin, cello and piano) (2007)
- David Conte
  - Trio for Violin, Cello, and Piano (2011)
- Aaron Copland
  - Vitebsk: Study on a Jewish Theme for Piano Trio (1928)
  - Prelude for piano trio
- Eleanor Cory
  - Designs for Piano Trio (1979)
  - Conversation for Piano Trio (2004)
- Luís Ferreira da Costa
  - Piano trio in C minor, Op. 15
- Cindy Cox
  - la mar amarga (2007)
  - Wave (2010)
- Helen C. Crane
  - Piano Trio in E major, Op. 20 (published in 1907)
  - Piano Trio in B♭ major, Op. 72 (1924-1927)
- Jean Cras
  - Piano Trio in C (1907)
  - Piano Trio (1926)
- Carl Czerny
  - Trois Sonatines faciles et brillantes pour le pianoforte seul ou avec accomp. d'un violon et violoncelle ad libitum, Op. 104 (1826)
  - Piano Trio No. 1 in E♭ major, Op. 105 (alternative version of a violin, horn and piano trio) (1826)
  - Piano Trio No. 2 in A major, Op. 166 (1829)
  - Piano Trio No. 3 in E major, Op. 173 (1829)
  - Piano Trio No. 4 in A minor, Op. 289 (ca. 1833)
  - Two Piano Trios in C major and A major, Op. 211 (ca. 1825)
  - Six Grand Potpourris for piano trio, Op. 212 (ca. 1825)
  - Fantasia concertante for piano, flute and cello, Op. 256 (ca. 1835)

== D ==
- Cecilia Damström
  - Summer Memories, Op. 42 (2015)
- Félicien David
  - Piano trio no. 1 in E♭ major (1857)
  - Piano trio no. 2 in D minor (1857)
  - Piano trio no. 3 in C minor (1857)
- Tina Davidson
  - Bodies In Motion for violin, cello and piano (with optional soprano, marimba) (2001)
  - Blue Like an Orange (2009)
  - Music for the Season (2010)
  - Tremble (2013)
- Peter Maxwell Davies
  - A Voyage to Fair Isle (2002)
- William L. Dawson (composer)
  - Piano Trio in A major (1925)
- Charles Auguste de Bériot
  - Piano Trio in D major sur des motifs de l'opera 'Robin des Bois', Op.4 (ca. 1820)
  - Piano Trio No.2 in D major, Op. 58 (ca. 1845)
  - Piano Trio No.3 (ca. 1845)
- Claude Debussy
  - Piano Trio in G major, L. 3 (1880)
- Arthur De Greef
  - Piano Trio in F minor (1935)
- David Del Tredici
  - Grand Trio (2001)
- Edison Denisov
  - Trio for violin, cello and piano, Op. 5 (1954) (dedicated to Dmitri Shostakovich)
  - Trio for violin, cello and piano, Op. 39 (1971)
- Emma Lou Diemer
  - Piano Trio (2001)
- Albert Dietrich
  - Piano Trio No.1 in C minor, Op.9 (1855)
  - Piano Trio No.2 in A major, Op.14 (1863)
- Violeta Dinescu
  - Ichthys (1991)
  - Et pourtant c'est mieux qu'en hiver... (2000)
- Ignacy Feliks Dobrzyński
  - Grand Trio, A minor, Op. 17 (1832)
- Johanna Doderer
  - Piano Trio (2002; DWV 31)
  - Second Piano Trio (2008; DWV 52)
  - Third Piano Trio (2009; DWV 64)
  - Morgen (2013; DWV 79)
  - Fourth Piano Trio (2016; DWV 110; numbered as no. 5
- Théodore Dubois
  - Piano Trio No.1, C minor
  - Piano Trio No.2, E major
  - Canon for Piano Trio
- Pascal Dusapin
  - Trio Rombach, for piano, violin or clarinet and cello (1997)
- Antonín Dvořák
  - Piano Trio No. 1 in B♭ major, Op. 21/B. 51 (1875)
  - Piano Trio No. 2 in G minor, Op. 26/B. 56 (1876)
  - Piano Trio No. 3 in F minor (once listed as Op. 64), Op. 65/B. 130 (1883)
  - Piano Trio No. 4 in E minor ("Dumky"), Op. 90/B. 166 (1891)
- Vladimir Dyck
  - Piano Trio in C minor, Op.25 (1910)

== E ==
- Sophie Carmen Eckhardt-Gramatté
  - Piano Trio, E. 157 (1967)
- Katharine Emily Eggar
  - Piano Trio in G minor (1905)
  - Fantasy Trio for Piano Trio in E minor
  - Rhapsodic Impression for violin, viola and piano (1928)
- Klaus Egge
  - Piano Trio, Op. 14 (1941)
- Maija Einfelde
  - Trio (1984)
  - Adagio (1994)
  - Trio for Violin, Cello and Piano (2016)
- Edward Elgar
  - Douce Pensée (1882)
  - Three Movements for Piano Trio (1924)
- Rosalind Ellicott
  - Piano Trio No. 1 in G major (1889)
  - Piano Trio No. 2 in D minor (1891)
- George Enescu
  - Piano Trio in G minor (1897)
  - Sérénade Lointaine for Piano Trio (1903)
  - Piano Trio in A minor (1916)
- Sven Einar Englund
  - Trio (1982)
- Iván Erőd
  - Trio No. 1 for Violin, Violoncello and Piano, Op. 21 (1976)
  - Trio No. 2 for Violin, Violoncello and Piano, Op. 42 (1982)

== F ==
- Louise Farrenc
  - Piano Trio No. 1 in E♭ major, Op. 33 (1844)
  - Piano Trio No. 2 in D minor, Op. 34 (1844)
- Arthur Farwell
  - Owasco Memories for Piano Trio, Op. 8 (1901)
  - The Gods of the Mountain for Piano Trio, Op. 52 (1917)
- Gabriel Fauré
  - Piano Trio in D minor, Op. 120 (1923)
- Sarah Feigin
  - Elegie in Memoriam Yitzhak Rabin for Piano Trio (1995)
- Morton Feldman
  - Trio, for violin, cello, and piano (1980)
- Vittorio Fellegara
  - Wintermusic (1983)
- Vincenzo Ferroni
  - Trio in D major, Op. 54
- Richard Festinger
  - Tapestries (1997)
- Zdeněk Fibich
  - Piano Trio in F minor (1872)
- Vivian Fine
  - Piano Trio (1980)
- Graciane Finzi
  - Trio (1975)
- Elena Firsova
  - Piano Trio No. 1, Op. 8 (1972)
  - Piano Trio No. 2, Mad Vision (1993)
- Josef Bohuslav Foerster
  - Piano Trio No. 1 in F minor, Op. 8 (1883)
  - Piano Trio No. 2 in B♭ major, Op. 38 (1894)
  - Piano Trio No. 3 in A minor, Op. 105 (1919-1921)
- Alexandra Fol
  - Watching the Stars Over the Rhodopi Mountains in Silence trio (version for violin, violoncello and piano) (2010)
- Jacqueline Fontyn
  - Trio (1956)
  - Lieber Joseph (2007)
  - Ferne Spuren (2009)
- Arthur Foote
  - Piano Trio No. 1 in C minor, Op. 5 (1883)
  - Piano Trio No. 2 in B♭ major, Op. 65 (1907–08)
- Kalitha Dorothy Fox
  - Trio for piano, violin and cello (performed 1926, presumed lost)
- Antonio Fragoso
  - Trio minor for Violin, Cello and Piano in C♯ major (1916)
- Jean Françaix
  - Piano Trio i D major (1986)
- Cheryl Frances-Hoad
  - Melancholia (2002)
  - My Fleeting Angel (2005)
  - The Forgiveness Machine (2010)
- César Franck
  - Piano Trio No. 1 in F♯ minor, Op. 1, No. 1 (1842)
  - Piano Trio No. 2 in B♭ major, Op. 1, No. 2 "Trio de salon" (1842)
  - Piano Trio No. 3 in B minor, Op. 1, No. 3 (1842)
  - Piano Trio No. 4 in B minor, Op. 2 (1842)
- Eduard Franck
  - Piano Trio in E major, WoO (published in 2012 by Pfefferkorn)
  - Piano Trio No. 1 in E minor, Op. 11 (1848)
  - Piano Trio No. 2 in E♭ major, Op. 22 (1852)
  - Piano Trio No. 3 in E♭ major, Op. 53 (1856) [The German National Library and Audite site list this work as being in D major, while IMSLP says E♭ major.]
  - Piano Trio No. 4 in D major, Op. 58 (1861)
- Richard Franck
  - Piano Trio No.1 in B minor, Op.20 (1893)
  - Piano Trio No.2 in E♭ major, Op.32 (1900)
- Gabriela Lena Frank
  - Four Folk Songs (2012)
- Sean Friar
  - Hell-bent (2006)
- Peter Fribbins
  - Piano Trio (2003 - 2004)
  - "Softly in the dusk..." for piano trio (2006 - 2007)
  - "Variations on a Burns Air" for piano trio (2009)
- Bohdana Frolyak
  - Lamento for piano trio (2007)
- Carl Frühling
  - Piano Trio in E♭ major, Op. 32 (ca. 1900)
  - Trio for Clarinet, Cello, and Piano, Op. 40 (1925)
- Gunnar de Frumerie
  - Piano Trio No. 2, Op. 45 (1952)
- Robert Fuchs
  - Piano Trio No. 1 in C major, Op. 22 (1879)
  - Piano Trio No. 2 in B♭ major, Op. 72 (1903)
  - Piano Trio No.3 in F♯ minor, Op. 115 (1921)
- Kenji Fujimura
  - Echoes of the Silver Screen (2015)
  - Music for One, Two, and Three... (2021)
- Vivian Fung
  - Scherzo (1998)
  - Ominous Machines (2023)
- Beat Furrer
  - retour an dich (1984)
- Robert Fürstenthal
  - Piano Trio, Op. 65

== G ==
- Niels Wilhelm Gade
  - Piano trio in B♭ major (1839)
  - Five Novelletten, Op. 29 (1853)
  - Trio in F major, Op. 42 (1863)
- Hans Gál
  - Variations on an Old Viennese Heurigen Melody, Op.9 (1914)
  - Piano Trio in E major, Op. 18 (1923)
  - Trio for violin (or flute, oboe), cello and piano. Op. 49b (1949)
- German Galynin
  - Trio (1947)
- Stacy Garrop
  - Seven for Piano Trio (1998)
  - Silver Dagger for Piano Trio (2009)
  - Jubilation for Piano Trio (2011)
  - Sanctuary for Piano Trio (2013)
  - The Solitude of Stars (2020)
  - Beacon of the Bay (2021)
- Lūcija Garūta
  - Trio in B♭ major (1948)
- Ada Gentile
  - Serene Ombre (2011)
- Harald Genzmer
  - Piano Trio in F major
- Friedrich Gernsheim
  - Piano Trio No. 1 in F major, Op. 28 (1872)
  - Piano Trio No. 2 [No.4], B major, Op. 37 (1877)
  - Two other piano trios (in manuscript form)
- Giorgio Federico Ghedini
  - Due Intermezzi (1915)
- Peter Gilbert (composer)
  - Sternbilder (2020)
- Philip Glass
  - Head On (1967)
- Mikhail Glinka
  - Trio Pathétique in D minor (1832)
- Benjamin Godard
  - Piano Trio No. 1 in G minor, Op. 32 (1880)
  - Piano Trio No. 2 in F major, Op. 72 (1884)
- Hermann Goetz
  - Piano Trio in G minor, Op. 1 (1863)
- Aleksandr Goldenweiser
  - Piano Trio to the Memory of Rachmaninov in E minor, Op.31 (1949—1950)
- Karl Goldmark
  - Piano Trio No. 1 in B♭ major, Op. 4 (1865)
  - Piano Trio No. 2 in E minor, Op. 33 (ca. 1877)
- Rubin Goldmark
  - Trio in D minor, Op. 1 (ca. 1900)
- Julia Gomelskaya
  - Fantasia on themes of "Porge and Bess" (1989)
  - "dive deep in a rhythm-risk-riot..." (2005)
- Annie Gosfield
  - Cranks and Cactus Needles (2000, trio version 2017)
- Konstantia Gourzi
  - music flows across the sea, Op. 60a (2015)
- Théodore Gouvy
  - Piano Trio No. 1 in E major, Op. 8 (1844)
  - Piano Trio No. 2 in A minor, Op. 18 (1847)
  - Piano Trio No. 3 in B♭ major, Op. 19 (1855)
  - Piano Trio No. 4 in F major, Op. 22 (1858)
  - Piano Trio No. 5 Op. 33 (1860)
- Paul Graener
  - Suite for Piano Trio, Op. 19
  - "Hungerpastor"-Kammermusikdichtung for Trio, Op. 20 (1906)
  - Piano Trio, Op. 61 (1923)
  - Theodor Storm-Musik, Op. 93
- Enrique Granados
  - Piano Trio in C major, Op. 50, H. 140 (1895)
- Clémence de Grandval
  - Piano Trio No. 1 (1849)
  - Piano Trio No. 2 in E♭ major, ICG 21 (1853)
- Maria Grenfell
  - A Feather of Blue (2000)
- Alexander Gretchaninov
  - Piano Trio No. 1 in C minor, Op. 38 (1906)
  - Piano Trio No. 2 in G major, Op. 128 (1931)
- Deirdre Gribbin
  - How to Make the Water Sound (1997)
  - Are you the Dream Catcher (2010)
- Edvard Grieg
  - Andante con moto, C minor, BoSE 137 (1878)
- Galina Grigorjeva
  - Postlude [Postlüüd] (2012)
- Jorge Grundman
  - A walk across adolescence (2011)
- César Guerra-Peixe
  - Piano Trio (1960)
- Elizabeth Gyring
  - Trio-Fantasy for Piano Trio (1954)

== H ==
- Daron Hagen
  - Piano Trio No. 1: "Trio Concertante" for violin, cello, and piano (1984)
  - Piano Trio No. 2: "J'entends" for violin, cello, and piano (1986)
  - Piano Trio No. 3: "Wayfaring Stranger" for violin, cello, and piano (2006)
  - Piano Trio No. 4: "Angel Band" for violin, cello, and piano (2007)
  - Piano Trio No. 5: "Red is the Rose" for violin, cello, and piano (2017)
  - Piano Trio No. 6: "Horszowski" for violin, cello, and piano (2017)
  - Piano Trio No. 7: "Wintergreen" for violin, cello, and piano (2019)
  - Piano Trio No. 8: "Pacifica" for violin, cello, and piano (2020)
  - Piano Trio No. 9: "Lagniappe" for violin, cello, and piano (2023)
- Gustaf Hägg
  - Piano Trio in g minor, Op. 15 (1896)
- Hanna Marie Hansen
  - Intermezzo (1896)
- James Harley
  - Troi for violin, violoncello, piano (2006)
- Pamela Harrison
  - Piano Trio (1967)
- Emil Hartmann
  - Piano Trio No. 1 in F♯ minor
  - Piano Trio No. 2 in B major, Op.10 (1867)
- Joseph Haydn
  - Piano Trios, H XV 1-45 (1766 - 1797)
- David Philip Hefti
  - Schattenspie(ge)l Trio for Violin, Cello and Piano (2006)
  - Lichter Hall Trio no. 2 for Violin, Cello and Piano (2012)
- Peter Arnold Heise
  - Piano Trio in E♭ major (1869)
- Stephen Heller
  - Intermezzo in E major (1842)
- Moya Henderson
  - Waking up the Flies for Piano Trio (1990)
- Swan Hennessy
  - Lieder an den Mond, Op. 10 (1888)
- Fini Henriques
  - Børne-Trio/Kinder-Trio in G major, Op. 31 (1909)
- Fanny Hensel
  - Piano Trio in D minor, Op.11 (1847, published post. 1850)
- Adolf von Henselt
  - Trio in A minor, Op. 24 (1851)
- Hans Werner Henze
  - Kammersonate (1948, rev. 1963)
  - Adagio adagio (1993)
- Henri Herz
  - Piano Trio in A major, Op. 54 (1830)
- Heinrich von Herzogenberg
  - Piano Trio (1862–63)
  - Piano Trio in B minor, WoO 37 (1869?)
  - Piano Trio No.1 in C minor, op.24 (1875–76)
  - Piano Trio No.2 in D minor, op.36 (1882)
- Jennifer Higdon
  - Piano Trio (can be performed together with Color Through) (2003)
  - Color Through (can be performed together with Piano Trio) (2003)
  - Lullaby
  - Love Sweet
  - Dash (2001)
- Wilhelm Hill
  - Piano Trio No. 1 in D major, Op. 12 (1863)
  - Piano Trio No. 2 in G major, Op. 43 (1878)
- Ferdinand Hiller
  - Piano Trio No. 6 in C minor (Serenade No. 2), Op. 186 (1880s?)
- Dorothy Hindman
  - Jerusalem Windows (2002)
- E. T. A. Hoffmann
  - Piano Trio in E major, AV. 52 (1809)
- Dulcie Holland
  - Fantasy Trio (1938)
  - Trio for Violin, Cello and Piano (1944)
  - Cradle Song for a Special Child (piano trio version: 1995)
- Robin Holloway
  - Piano Trio (2018)
- Leonie Holmes
  - ...when expectation ends (2014)
- Katherine Hoover
  - Trio for Piano Trio, Op. 14 (1978)
- Egil Hovland
  - Trio for Piano Trio, Op. 48 (1965)
  - Piano Trio (1977)
- Emily Howard
  - Broken Hierarchies II (2009)
- Mary Howe
  - Suite mélancolique for Piano Trio (1931)
- An-lun Huang (1949-)
  - Piano Trio No. 1 in D minor, Op. 30
  - Piano Trio No. 2 in B major, Op. 83
- Hans Huber
  - Piano Trio No. 1 in E♭ major, Op. 20
  - Piano Trio No. 2 in E, Op. 65 (pub. 1883)
  - Piano Trio No. 3 in F, Op. 105 (pub. 1890)
  - Eine Bergnovelle (after E. Zahn's "Bergvolk", Trio No. 4, Op. 120)
- Johann Nepomuk Hummel
  - Piano Trio No, 1 in E♭ major, Op. 12 (1803)
  - Piano Trio No. 2 in F major, Op. 22 (1807)
  - Piano Trio No. 3 in G major, Op. 35 (1811)
  - Piano Trio No. 4 in G major, Op. 65 (1815)
  - Piano Trio No. 5 in E major, Op. 83 (1820)
  - Piano Trio No. 6 in E♭ major, Op. 93 (1826)
  - Piano Trio No. 7 in E♭ major, Op. 96 (1826)
- William Hurlstone
  - Piano Trio in G major (1905)
- Henry Holden Huss
  - Piano Trio in D minor, Op. 23 "The Munich" (1886)
- Miriam Hyde
  - Fantasy Trio in B minor, Op. 26 (1932-3)
  - Fantasia on 'Waltzing Matilda' for Piano Trio, Op. 40c (1936)

== I ==
- John Ireland
  - Phantasy-Trio in A minor (1906)
  - Piano Trio No. 2 in E minor (1917)
  - Piano Trio No. 3 (1938)
- Charles Ives
  - Piano Trio, S. 86 (1904–11)

== J ==
- Salomon Jadassohn
  - Piano Trio 1 in F major, Op.16 (1858)
  - Piano Trio 2 in E major, Op.20 (1860)
  - Piano Trio 3 in C minor, Op.59 (1880)
  - Piano Trio 4 in C minor, Op.85 (1887)
- Marie Jaëll
  - Piano Trio (1881)
- Betsy Jolas
  - Trio 88 (1988)
  - "Ah! Haydn" (2007)
- Joseph Jongen
  - Piano Trio in B minor, Op. 10 (1897)
  - Trio for Violin, Viola, and Piano, Op. 30 (1907)
  - Deux pieces en trio, Op. 95 (1931)
- John Joubert
  - Landscapes for soprano and piano trio, Op. 129 (1992)
- Paul Juon
  - Piano Trio No. 1 in A minor, Op.17 (1901)
  - Trio-Caprice on Selma Lagerlof's "Gosta Berling" in B minor, Op. 39 [Trio No. 2] (1908)
  - Piano Trio No. 3 in G major, Op. 60 (1915)
  - Litaniae. Tone Poem in C♯ minor, Op. 70 [Trio No. 4] (1918, rev.1929)
  - Legend in D minor, Op. 83 [Trio No. 5] (1930)
  - Suite in C major, Op. 89 (1932)

== K ==
- Mauricio Kagel
  - Piano Trio No. 1 (1984/85)
  - Piano Trio No. 2 (2001)
  - Piano Trio No. 3 (2007)
- Robert Kahn
  - Piano Trio No. 1 in E major, op. 19 (1893)
  - Piano Trio No. 2 in E♭ major, op. 33 (1900)
  - Piano Trio No. 3 in C minor, op. 35 (1902)
  - Piano Trio No. 4 in E minor, op. 72 (1922)
- Friedrich Kalkbrenner
  - Piano Trio No. 1 in E minor, Op. 7 (ca.1810)
  - Piano Trio No. 2 in A♭ major, Op. 14 (ca. 1813)
  - Piano Trio No. 3 in B♭ major, Op. 26 (1816)
  - Piano Trio No. 4 in D major, Op. 84 (1827)
  - Piano Trio No. 5 in A♭ major, Op. 149 (1841)
  - Sonata in B♭ major for piano, cello and flute (or violin) op. 39 (ca. 1820)
- Laura Kaminsky
  - Vukovar Trio (1999)
  - Piano Trio (2007)
- Emanuel Kania
  - Piano Trio in G minor (1867)
- Leokadiya Kashperova
  - Piano Trio in D major, Op. 3 (1904)
  - Piano Trio Nr. 2 (1912, unpublished)
  - Piano Trio in A minor (Op. Posth.)
- Elena Kats-Chernin
  - Gypsy Ramble (1999)
  - A-void-ance (2002)
  - Eliza Aria (2004/2012)
  - The Spirit and the Maiden (2004)
  - Calliope Dreaming (2009)
  - Brothers (2020)
  - Take me along (2020)
- Hugo Kaun
  - Piano Trio No. 1 in B♭ major, Op. 32 (published 1896)
  - Piano Trio No. 2 in C minor, Op. 58 (published 1904)
- Jānis Ķepītis
  - Piano Trio No. 1 (1934)
  - Piano Trio No. 2 (1940)
  - Piano Trio No. 3 (1957)
  - Piano Trio No. 4 (1972)
  - Piano Trio No. 5 (1978)
  - Piano Trio No. 6 (1979)
  - Piano Trio No. 7 (1979)
- Dorothy Ker
  - Onaia (2013-2014)
- Manuela Kerer
  - Canto sferico (2016/17)
- Frida Kern
  - Piano Trio, Op. 15 (1933)
- Friedrich Kiel
  - Piano Trio No. 1 in D major, Op. 3 (1850)
  - Piano Trio No. 2 in A major, Op. 22 (1861)
  - Piano Trio No. 3 in E♭ major, Op. 24 (1861)
  - Piano Trio No. 4 in C♯ minor, Op. 33 (1863)
  - Piano Trio No. 5 in G major, Op. 34 (1864)
  - Piano Trio No. 6 in G major, Op. 65, No. 1 (written 1871, published 1875)
  - Piano Trio No. 7 in G minor, Op. 65, No. 2 (written 1871, published 1875)
- Wilhelm Kienzl
  - Piano Trio in F minor, Op.13 (1880)
- Leon Kirchner
  - Piano Trio No. 1 (1954)
  - Piano Trio No. 2 (1993)
- Theodor Kirchner
  - Novelletten, Op. 59
  - Bunte Blätter, Op. 83
- Natalie Klouda
  - Fantasy Triptych (2017)
- August Klughardt
  - Piano trio in B♭ major, Op. 47 (1885)
- Julia Klumpke
  - Piano Trio
- Barbara Kolb
  - Monticello Trio in 2 movements (1991)
- Hans von Koessler
  - Trio-Suite in A minor for violin, viola, and piano (1922 or earlier)
- Nikolai Korndorf
  - Are You Ready Brother Trio for piano, violin and cello (1996)
- Erich Wolfgang Korngold
  - Piano Trio in D major, Op. 1 (1910)
- Viktor Kosenko
  - Classical Trio for Violin, Cello and Piano in D major, Op. 17 (1927)
- Dina Koston
  - Piccolo Trio (2002)
- Mathilde Kralik
  - Piano Trio in F major (1880)
- Joseph Martin Kraus
  - 6 Hoffstetter Trios (lost)
  - Piano Trio in D major
- Rafael Kubelík
  - Trio concertante (1988)
- Toivo Kuula
  - Piano Trio, Op. 7 (1908)
- Elisabeth Kuyper
  - Piano Trio in D major, Op. 13 (1909-1911)

== L ==
- Fernand de La Tombelle
  - Piano Trio in A minor, Op.35 (1894)
- Paul Lacombe
  - Piano Trio No. 1 in G major, Op. 12 (1870)
  - Piano Trio No. 2, Op. 90
  - Sérénade humoristique, Trio for violin, cello and piano, Op. 93 (1898)
  - Piano Trio No. 3 in A minor, Op. 134 (1909)
- László Lajtha
  - Trio concertante, Op. 10 (1928)
- Édouard Lalo
  - Piano Trio No. 1 in C minor, Op. 7 (1849/50)
  - Piano Trio No. 2 in B minor (Ode on Music "Descend, ye Nine?") (c.1852)
  - Piano Trio No. 3 in A minor, Op. 26 (1880)
- Marta Lambertini
  - Los fuegos de San Telmo for Piano Trio (1985)
  - La casa inundada for Piano Trio (1995)
- Peter Lange-Müller
  - Piano Trio in F-minor, Op.53 (1898)
- Libby Larsen
  - Trio (2001)
- Hannah Lash
  - Around (2015)
- Sylvio Lazzari
  - Piano trio in G minor, Op. 13 (1889)
- Luise Adolpha Le Beau
  - Piano Trio in D minor, Op. 15 (1879)
- Nicola LeFanu
  - Piano Trio (2003)
- Helvi Leiviskä
  - Piano Trio (1924)
  - Meditatio for Piano Trio (1933)
- Guillaume Lekeu
  - Piano Trio in C minor (1889-1891)
- Artur Lemba
  - Piano Trio No. 1 in B♭ major (1929)
  - Piano Trio No. 2 (1933)
  - Piano Trio No. 3 (1935)
  - Piano Trio No. 4 (1958)
- Tania Léon
  - Elegia a Paul Robeson for Piano Trio (1987)
- Lowell Liebermann
  - Piano Trio No. 1, Op. 32 (1990)
  - Piano Trio No. 2, Op. 77 (2001)
  - Piano Trio No. 3, Op. 122 (2012)
- Helene Liebmann
  - Piano Trio in A major, Op. 11 (ca. 1816)
  - Piano Trio in D major, Op. 12 (ca. 1816)
- Dinu Lipatti
  - Improvisation for Piano Trio
- Franz Liszt
  - Rhapsodie Hongroise No. 9 - Le Carnaval de Pesth [S.379a] (1855)
  - Orpheus. Symphonic Poem (transcribed by Camille Saint-Saëns)
  - Piano Trio La Lugubre Gondola (1882), also arranged for piano solo
- Henry Charles Litolff
  - Piano Trio No. 1 in D minor, Op. 47 (1850)
  - Piano Trio No. 2, Op. 56 (ca. 1850)
  - Piano Trio No. 3 in C minor, Op. 100 (ca. 1854)
- Kate Loder
  - Piano Trio (1886)
- Carl Loewe
  - Grand Trio in G minor, Op. 12 (1821, pub. 1830)
- Christophe Looten
  - Austrian Trio
- Ivana Loudová
  - Trio in B♭ for violin, violoncello and piano (1986–87)
- Maria de Lourdes Martins
  - Piano Trio, Op. 17 (1959)
- Boris Lyatoshinsky
  - Piano Trio No. 1, Op. 7 (1922/25)
  - Piano Trio No. 2, Op. 41 (1942)
- Gilda Lyons
  - Folklórico (2009)
  - Half Light (2014)

== M ==
- Peter Machajdik
  - Metaphor (for Piano Trio) (2017)
  - Into the Distance (for Piano Trio) (2021)
- Ester Mägi
  - Piano Trio in D minor (1950)
- Albéric Magnard
  - Piano Trio in F minor, Op.18 (1904-5)
- Gian Francesco Malipiero
  - Sonata a tre (1927)
- Otto Malling
  - Piano Trio in A minor, Op. 36 (1890)
- Paula af Malmborg Ward
  - causeries (2018)
- Ursula Mamlok
  - Panta rhei (Time in Flux) for Piano Trio (1981)
- Mana-Zucca
  - Piano Trio
- Ljubica Marić
  - Torso (1996)
- Dimitris Maronidis
  - Chaconne for Piano Trio and Electronics (2020)
- Heinrich Marschner
  - Piano Trio no. 1 in A minor, Op.29 (1823)
  - Piano Trio no. 2 in G minor, Op. 111 (1841)
  - Piano Trio no. 3 in F minor Op.121 (1843)
  - Piano Trio no. 4 in D major, Op.135 (1847)
  - Piano Trio no. 5 in D minor, Op.138 (1848)
  - Piano Trio no. 6 in C minor, Op. 148 (1850?)
  - Piano Trio no. 7 in F, Op. 167 (1855)
- Cécile Marti
  - Forming Sculpture - Sculpting Process (2017-2018)
- Frank Martin
  - Trio sur des mélodies polulaires irlandaises (1925)
- Žibuoklė Martinaitytė
  - Inhabited Silences (2010)
  - When The Blue Hour… (2016)
  - In Search Of Lost Beauty… for violin, cello, piano, electronics and video (2016)
- Bohuslav Martinů
  - Piano Trio No. 1 ("Cinq pièces brèves"), H. 193 (1930)
  - Five Bergerettes for piano trio, H. 275 (1939)
  - Piano Trio No. 2 in D minor, H. 327 (1950)
  - Piano Trio No. 3 in C major, H. 332 (1951)
- Giuseppe Martucci
  - Piano Trio No. 1 in C major, Op. 59 (1882)
  - Piano Trio No. 2 in E♭ major, Op. 62 (1883)
- Joseph Marx
  - Trio-Phantasie (1914)
- Emilie Mayer
  - Piano Trio in E minor
  - Piano Trio in E♭ major (1845-55 ca.)
  - Piano Trio in D minor (1855-56 ca.)
  - Piano Trio in A minor (1855-61 ca.)
  - Piano Trio in E minor, Op. 12 (1861)
  - Piano Trio in D major, Op. 13 (1862)
  - Piano Trio in B minor, Op. 16 (1862)
- Joseph Mayseder
  - Piano Trio No. 1 in E♭ major, Op. 34
  - Piano Trio No. 2 F major, Op. 41
  - Piano Trio No. 3 F major, Op. 51
  - Piano Trio No. 4 in A♭ major, Op. 52
  - Piano Trio Variations, Op. 57
  - Piano Trio No. 5 in E minor, Op. 58 (1843)
  - Piano Trio No. 6 in G major, Op. 59 (1844)
- Missy Mazzoli
  - A Thousand Tongues for violin, cello, piano and pre-recorded electronics (2011)
- Cecilia McDowall
  - Colour of Blossoms (2009)
- Diana McIntosh
  - Playback for Piano Trio (1987)
- Jenny McLeod
  - Seascapes (2015)
  - Clouds (2021)
- Ludwig Meinardus
  - Piano Trio in A minor, Op. 40
- Felix Mendelssohn
  - Piano Trio No. 1 in D minor, Op. 49 (1839)
  - Piano Trio No. 2 in C minor, Op. 66 (1845)
- Krzysztof Meyer
  - Piano Trio, Op. 50 (1980)
- Kirsten Milenko
  - Solace (2020)
- Darius Milhaud
  - Piano Trio, Op. 428 (1969)
- Ida Moberg
  - Dankbarkeit-Trio (1943, lost)
- Eric Moe
  - We Happy Few (1990)
- Ernest John Moeran
  - Piano Trio in D major (1920)
- Bernhard Molique
  - Piano Trio No.1 in B♭ major, Op.27 (ca. 1847)
  - Piano Trio No.2 in F major, Op.52 (1858)
- Claudia Molitor
  - After the strangely monumental (2009)
- Dorothy Rudd Moore
  - Piano Trio No. 1 (1970)
- Undine Smith Moore
  - Soweto (1987)
- Ignaz Moscheles
  - Piano Trio in C minor, Op.84 (1831)
- Mihály Mosonyi
  - Piano Trio in B♭ major, Op. 1 (1851)
- Gabriela Moyseowicz
  - Musique en trois styles for Piano Trio (1969)
- Wolfgang Amadeus Mozart
  - Piano Trio No. 1 in B♭ major, K. 254 (1776)
  - Piano Trio No. 2 in G major, K. 496 (1786)
  - Piano Trio No. 3 in B♭ major, K. 502 (1786)
  - Piano Trio No. 4 in E major, K. 542 (1788)
  - Piano Trio No. 5 in C major, K. 548 (1788)
  - Piano Trio No. 6 in G major, K. 564 (1788)
  - Piano Trio in D minor, K. 442 (1783?)
  - Fragment in B♭ major, K. 501a (1786)
- Geraldine Mucha
  - Piano Trio (1995)
- Robert Muczynski
  - Piano Trio No. 1, Op. 24 (1966)
  - Piano Trio No. 2, Op. 36 (1975)
  - Piano Trio No. 3, Op. 46 (1986-7)
- Nico Muhly
  - Common Ground (2009)
- Helena Munktell
  - Kleines Trio
- Zae Munn
  - With a Vengeance (1991)
- Nicole Murphy
  - Pearl
  - Surface 2 (2013)
  - Spinning Top (2016)

== N ==
- Eduard Nápravník
  - Piano Trio No.1 in G minor, Op.24 (1876)
  - Piano Trio No.2 in D minor, Op.62 (1897)
- Lior Navok
  - Piano Trio (1999)
- Laura Netzel
  - Piano Trio No. 1 in D♭ major, Serenade, Op. 50 (1895)
  - Piano Trio No. 2 in G minor, Preludio e fughetta, Op. 68 (1900)
  - Piano Trio No. 3 in D minor, Op. 78 (1903)
- Olga Neuwirth
  - Quasare / Pulsare II (2017)
- Dika Newlin
  - Piano Trio, Op. 2 (1948)
- Carl Nielsen
  - Piano Trio in G minor, FS 3i (1883)
- Ib Nørholm
  - Piano Trio, Op. 22 (1959)
- Vítězslav Novák
  - Piano Trio No. 1 in G minor, Op. 1 (ca. 1890)
  - Piano Trio No. 2 in D minor "Quasi una ballata", Op. 27 (ca. 1900)

== O ==
- Jane O'Leary
  - Piano Trio (1992)
- George Onslow
  - Piano Trios Nos. 1–3 in A major, C major, G minor, Op. 3 (1807)
  - Piano Trios Nos. 4–6 in E minor, E major, D major, Op. 14 (1817)
  - Piano Trio No. 7 in D minor, Op. 20 (1822)
  - Piano Trio No. 8 in C minor, Op. 26 (1823)
  - Piano Trio No. 9 in G major, Op. 27 (1823)
  - Piano Trio No. 10 in F minor, Op. 83 (1851/2)
- Cornélie van Oosterzee
  - 2 Phantasiestücke for Piano Trio, Op. 18 (1900)
- William Ortiz-Alvarado
  - Composición para Violín, Violonchelo y Piano (1982)
- Henrique Oswald
  - Piano Trio, op. 9 (1884)
- Frank J. Oteri
  - Memory Now I Can't Recall (2014)
- Morfydd Owen
  - Piano Trio in D major (1915)
- María Luisa Ozaita
  - Piano Trio (1987)

== P ==
- Christian Palmer
  - Piano Trio No. 1 in E♭ major
  - Piano Trio No. 2 in A major
  - Piano Trio No. 3 in F major
  - Piano Trio No. 5 in C major
- Arvo Pärt
  - Mozart - Adagio for piano trio (1992/1997)
- Joan Panetti
  - The Instant Gatherers for piano trio
- Andrzej Panufnik
  - Piano Trio (1934)
- Hilda Paredes
  - Alegoría Tri-partita (2008)
- Hubert Parry
  - Piano Trio No. 1 in E minor (1878)
- Robert Paterson
  - Sun Trio (1995/rev. 2008)
  - Moon Trio (2015)
- Dora Pejačević
  - Piano Trio No. 1 in D major, Op. 15 (1902)
  - Piano Trio No. 2 in C major, Op. 29 (1910)
- Barbara Pentland
  - Piano Trio (1963)
- Camille Pépin
  - The Road not taken (2018)
- Zenobia Powell Perry
  - Excursions for Piano Trio (1989)
- Carmen Petra Basacopol
  - Piano Trio (1959)
- Hans Pfitzner
  - Piano Trio in B♭ major (1886)
  - Piano Trio in F major, Op.8 (1890-1896)
- Gabriel Pierné
  - Piano Trio in C minor, Op.45

- Willem Pijper
  - Trio No. 1 for violin, violoncello & piano (1914)
  - Trio No. 2 for violin, violoncello & piano (1921)
- Werner Pirchner
  - Wem gehört der Mensch...? PWV 31 (1988)
  - Heimat? PWV 29a (1992)
- Johann Peter Pixis
  - Piano Trio no. 1 in E♭ major, Op.75 (ca. 1790, publ. 1825)
  - Piano Trio no. 2 in F major, Op.86 (1827)
  - Piano Trio no. 3 in B minor, Op.95 (ca. 1828)
  - Piano Trio no. 4 in E♭ major, Op.118 (1832)
  - Piano Trio no. 5 in C major, Op.129 (1836)
  - Piano Trio no. 6 in F♯ minor, Op.139 (1839)
  - Piano Trio no. 7 in D minor, Op.145 (1845)
- Ildebrando Pizzetti
  - Piano trio in G minor (1900)
  - Piano trio in A major (1925)
- Ignaz Joseph Pleyel
  - Piano Trio in G major, Op. 16, no. 2, Ben. 432
  - Piano Trio in E minor, Op. 16, no. 5, Ben. 435
  - Piano Trio in B♭ major, Ben. 440
  - Piano Trio in C major, Ben. 441 (1790s?)
  - Piano Trio in F minor, Ben. 442
  - Piano Trio in A major, Ben. 448 (1790s?)
  - Piano Trio in D major, Op. 29, Ben. 461
  - Piano Trio in F major, Op. 47, No. 1, Ben. 474
- Gerhard Präsent
  - Trio intricato (1983–1985)
  - Tête-à-tête-à-tête (1995/98)
  - Melodic Pieces (2004–06)
- Teresa Procaccini
  - Piano Trio, Op. 53 (1956)
- Julia Purgina
  - Masslosigkeit for Piano Trio (2007)
  - Salute a te, o divino pidocchio lunare (2014)
  - Mirabilia Mundi I - Semiramidis Horti Pensiles (2015)
  - musique noire IV for piano trio (2020)

== R ==
- Sergei Rachmaninoff
  - Trio Elégiaque No. 1 in G minor, Op. posth. (1892)
  - Trio Elégiaque No. 2 in D minor, Op. 9 (1893)
  - Vocalise - Arranged for violin, cello and piano (1912)
- Robert Radecke
  - Piano Trio in B♭ major, WoO 111 (1851)
  - Piano Trio No. 1 in A♭ major, Op. 30, composed by 1851 (reworked and pub. 1864)
  - Piano Trio No. 2 in B minor, Op. 33
- Joachim Raff
  - Piano Trio No. 1 in C minor, Op. 102 (1861)
  - Piano Trio No. 2 in G major, Op. 112 (1863)
  - Piano Trio No. 3 in A minor, Op. 155 (1870)
  - Piano Trio No. 4 in D major, Op. 158 (1870)
- Priaulx Rainier
  - Suite en Trio (1960)
- Shulamit Ran
  - Excursions (1980)
  - Soliloquy (1997)
- Behzad Ranjbaran
  - Shiraz for Piano Trio (2006)
- François Rasse
  - Piano Trio No. 1 in B minor, Op.16 (1897)
  - Piano Trio No. 2 (1911)
  - Piano Trio No. 3 (1951)
- Santa Ratniece
  - entasis (2021)
- Elizabeth Raum
  - Rondo Variations for piano, violin, and double bass (or cello) (1989)
  - Searching for Sophia (1995)
  - Cinderella Suite (1996)
  - White Horse Inn By Moonlight (2010)
- Maurice Ravel
  - Piano Trio in A minor (1914)
- Napoléon Henri Reber
  - Piano Trio No.1 in A major, Op.8 (1837)
  - Piano Trio No.2 in E♭ major, Op.12 Published 1825.
  - Piano Trio No.3 in G minor, Op.16 (1862)
  - Piano Trio No.4 'Sérénade' in D major, Op.25 (1864)
  - Piano Trio No.5 in C major, Op.30 (1872)
  - Piano Trio No.6 in E major, Op.34 (1876)
  - Piano Trio No.7 in A minor, Op.37 (1880)
- Max Reger
  - Trio for Violin, Viola, and Piano in B minor, Op. 2 (1891)
  - Piano Trio in E minor, Op. 102 (1907)
- Karin Rehnqvist
  - BEGINNING (Begynnelsen) (2003)
- Anton Reicha
  - Sonata for Piano, Violin and Cello in C major, Op. 47 (pub. 1804)
  - Six Trios Concertants for piano, violin and cello (E♭ major, D minor, C major, F major, D major, A major), Op. 101 (Paris, 1824)
  - Trio (1824)
  - Trio (?)
- Michèle Reverdy
  - En terre inconnue for Piano Trio (1992)
  - Fragments d'un discours - Hommage à Clara Schumann (2018)
- Josef Rheinberger
  - Piano Trio in D minor, Op. 34 (1862, revised 1867)
  - Piano Trio in A major, Op. 112 (1878)
  - Piano Trio No. 3 in B♭ major, Op. 121 (1880)
  - Piano Trio No. 4 in F major, Op. 191 (1898) (Rheinberger Trios MDG 303 0419-2 [JW]: Classical CD Reviews- January 2005 MusicWeb(UK)), also arranged as a sextet for piano, strings & winds
- Ferdinand Ries
  - Piano Trio in E♭ major, Op.2 (1807)
  - Piano Trio in B♭ major, Op.28 for piano, clarinet & cello (1810)
  - Piano Trio in E♭ major, Op.63 for piano, flute & cello (1815)
  - Piano Trio in C minor, Op.143 (1826)
- Wolfgang Rihm
  - Trio (1972)
  - Fremde Szenen I. - III. Versuche für Klaviertrio (1982/84)
- Sarah Rimkus
  - Sunset Boulevard (2014)
- Nikolai Rimsky-Korsakov
  - Trio in C minor, for violin, violoncello, and piano, 1897; completed by his son-in-law Maximilian Steinberg in 1939
- Malcolm D Robertson
  - Piano Trio (2018-2019)
- George Rochberg
  - Piano Trio No. 1 (1963)
  - Piano Trio No. 2 (1985)
  - Piano Trio No. 3 "Summer, 1990" (1990)
- Kurt Roger
  - Trio in E♭ major, Op. 77 (1953)
- Elena Romero
  - Fantasía española for Piano Trio (1952)
  - Divertimento for Piano Trio (1983)
- Lucia Ronchetti
  - Opus 100 - Criptomnesie da Schubert (2005)
- Julius Röntgen
  - Piano Trio No. 1 in B♭ major, Op. 23 (1883)
  - Piano Trio No. 2 in D major (1898)
  - Piano Trio No. 3 in G minor (1898)
  - Piano Trio No. 4 in C minor, Op. 50 (1904)
  - in addition to 10 other piano trios written between the years 1883 and 1932
- Amanda Röntgen-Maier
  - Piano Trio in E♭ major (1873-1874)
- Nikolai Roslavets
  - Piano Trio No. 1 (1913) — published ca. 1913 by Grosse
  - Piano Trio No. 2 (lost)
  - Piano Trio No. 3 (1920) — published 1929
  - Piano Trio No. 4 (1939) (incomplete score)
  - Piano Trio No. 5 (1941) — Schott ED 8128
- Albert Roussel
  - Piano Trio in E♭ major, Op. 2 (1902, rev. 1927)
- Edmund Rubbra
  - Piano Trio in One Movement, Op. 68 (1950)
  - Piano Trio No. 2, Op. 138 (1970) (EDMUND RUBBRA (1901-1986) A COMPACT BIOGRAPHY and CD Reviews by Rob Barnett)
- Anton Rubinstein
  - Piano Trio No. 1 in F major, Op. 15/1 (1851)
  - Piano Trio No. 2 in G minor, Op. 15/2 (1851)
  - Piano Trio No. 3 in B♭ major, Op. 52 (1857)
  - Piano Trio No. 4 in A major, Op. 85 (1871)
  - Piano Trio No. 5 in C minor, Op. 108 (1883)
- Elena Ruehr
  - The Scarlatti Effect (1997)
  - Blackberries (2007)
- Joseph Ryelandt
  - Piano Trio No. 1 in B minor, Op. 57 (1915)
  - Piano Trio No. 2, Op. 131 (1944)

== S ==
- Kaija Saariaho
  - Light and Matter for Piano Trio (2014)
- Leonid Sabaneyev
  - Trio Impromptu for Piano Trio in d minor, Op. 4 (1907)
  - Piano Trio, Op. 20, Sonata (1924)
- Camille Saint-Saëns
  - Piano Trio No. 1 in F major, Op. 18 (1863)
  - Piano Trio No. 2 in E minor, Op. 92 (1892)
- Claudio Santoro
  - Piano Trio (1973)
- Fazıl Say
  - Space Jump for Piano Trio, Op. 46 (2013)
- Philipp Scharwenka
  - Piano Trio No. 1 in F minor, Op. 26
  - Piano Trio No. 2 in C♯ minor, Op. 100 (1897)
  - Duo for Violin & Viola with Piano (Piano Trio No. 3) in A major, Op. 105 (1898)
  - Piano Trio No. 4 in G major, Op. 112 (1902)
  - Piano Trio No. 5 in E minor, Op.121 (1915)
- Xaver Scharwenka
  - Piano Trio No. 1 in F♯ minor, Op. 1 (1868)
  - Piano Trio No. 2 in A minor, Op. 45 (1878)
- Lalo Schifrin
  - Hommage à Ravel (1995)
- Florent Schmitt
  - Sonatine en trio, Op. 85b
- Friedrich Schneider
  - Piano Trio in E♭ major, Op. 38 (1816)
- Alfred Schnittke
  - Piano Trio (arrangement made in 1992 of string trio (1985))
- Arnold Schoenberg
  - Verklärte Nacht for Violin, Cello and Piano, Op. 4 (arr. E. Steuermann) (1899)
- Paul Schoenfield
  - Café Music
- Franz Schubert
  - Piano Trio in B♭ major "Sonatensatz", D. 28 (1812)
  - Piano Trio in E♭ major "Notturno" (Adagio only), D. 897, Op. post. 148 (1828)
  - Piano Trio No. 1 in B♭ major, D. 898, Op. 99 (1828)
  - Piano Trio No. 2 in E♭ major, D. 929, Op. 100 (1827)
- Gunther Schuller
  - Piano Trio (1984)
- Clara Schumann
  - Trio for piano, violin & cello in G minor, Op. 17 (1846)
- Georg Schumann
  - Piano Trio No.1 in F major, Op.25 (1899)
  - Piano Trio No.2 in F major, Op.62 (1915)
- Robert Schumann
  - Fantasiestücke in A minor, Op.88 (1842)
  - Studien. 6 Stücke in canonischer Form Op. 56 (arr. Th. Kirchner) (1845)
  - Piano Trio No. 1 in D minor, Op. 63 (1847)
  - Piano Trio No. 2 in F major, Op. 80 (1847)
  - Piano Trio No. 3 in G minor, Op. 110 (1851)
- Laura Schwendinger
  - C'e la Luna Questa Sera? (2006)
  - Arc of Fire (2013)
- Cyril Scott
  - Piano Trio in E minor, Op. 3 (c. 1899)
  - Piano Trio No. 1 (1920)
  - Piano Trio No. 2 (1950)
  - Piano Trio No. 3 (1957)
- Peter Seabourne
  - Last Dance (2010)
  - Piano Trio (2018)
- Hilda Sehested
  - Intermezzi for Piano Trio (1904)
- Charlotte Seither
  - Champlève (1994)
  - Equal Ways of Difference (2011)
- Johanna Senfter
  - Piano Trio, Op. 21
  - Piano Trio, Op. 47
  - Piano Trio, Op. 54
  - Piano Trio, Op. 134
- Vache Sharafyan
  - Piano Trio 1 (2000)
  - Piano Trio #2 "Dream of dreams" (2004)
  - Piano Trio #3 "Moonlight over Jerusalem" (2013)
  - "Continuations" four movements for Piano Trio (2012)
- Rodion Shchedrin
  - Piano-Terzetto for Piano Trio (1995)
  - Three Funny Pieces for Piano Trio (1997)
- Vissarion Shebalin
  - Piano Trio in A major, Op. 39 (1946/47)
- Dmitri Shostakovich
  - Piano Trio No. 1 in C minor, Op. 8 (1923)
  - Piano Trio No. 2 in E minor, Op. 67 (1944)
- Marilyn Shrude
  - Raining Glass (2002)
  - Sotto Voce (2012)
- Jean Sibelius
  - Piano Trio No. 1 in A minor, JS 206 (1884)
  - Allegro for Piano Trio, JS 27 (1886)
  - Piano Trio No. 2 in A minor "Havträsk trio", JS 207 (1886)
  - Piano Trio No. 3 in D major "Korpo trio", JS 209 (1887)
  - Andantino for Piano Trio, JS 43 (1887-8)
  - Piano Trio No. 4 in C major "Lovisa trio", JS 208 (1888)
- Arlene Sierra
  - Truel (2004)
  - Butterflies Remember a Mountain (2013)
- Sheila Silver
  - To the Spirit Unconquered (1992)
- Faye-Ellen Silverman
  - Reconstructed Music for Piano Trio (2002)
- Valentyn Silvestrov
  - "Drama" for violin, cello and piano (1971)
- Christian Sinding
  - Piano Trio No. 1, Op.23 in D major (1893)
  - Piano Trio No. 2, Op.64a in A minor (1902)
  - Piano Trio No. 3, Op.87 in C major (1908)
- Nikos Skalkottas
  - Piano Trio (1936)
  - Eight Variations for Piano Trio (on a Greek Folk Tune) (1938)
- Bedřich Smetana
  - Piano Trio in G minor, JB 1:64, Op. 15 (1855)
- Alice Mary Smith
  - Piano Trio in G major (1872)
- Julia Smith (composer)
  - Cornwall Trio (1966)
- Linda Catlin Smith
  - Ribbon (2001)
  - Far From Shore (2010)
  - Dreamer Murmuring (2014)
- Ethel Smyth
  - Trio for violin, cello and piano in D minor (1880)
- Charlotte Sohy
  - Petite suite, Op. 13 (1921)
  - Trio, Op. 24 (1931)
- Bent Sørensen
  - Phantasmagoria (2007)
  - Abgesänge (2015)
- Marcelle Soulage
  - Piano Trio in A minor, Op. 34 (1922)
- Louis Spohr
  - Piano Trio No.1 in E minor, Op.119 (1841)
  - Piano Trio No.2 in F major, Op.123 (1842)
  - Piano Trio No.3 in A minor, Op.124 (1842)
  - Piano Trio No.4 in B major, Op.133 (1846)
  - Piano Trio No.5 in G minor, Op.142 (1849)
- Charles Villiers Stanford
  - Piano Trio No. 1 in E♭ major, Op. 35 (1889)
  - Piano Trio No. 2 in G minor, Op. 73 (1899)
  - Piano Trio No. 3 in A minor "Per aspera ad astra", Op. 158 (1918)
- Iet Stants
  - Piano Trio (1925)
  - Piano Trio (1938)
- Gitta Steiner
  - Piano Trio (1985)
- Carlos Stella
  - Brahms im Spiegelkabinett
- Constantin von Sternberg
  - Piano Trio No.1, Op.69 (1895)
  - Piano Trio No.2 in F♯ minor, Op.79 (1898)
  - Piano Trio No.3 in C major, Op.104 (1912)
  - Aus Italien for Piano Trio, Op.105 (1912)
- Ingrid Stölzel
  - The Road is All (2007)
- Richard Stöhr
  - Piano Trio in E♭ major, Op. 16 (1905)
  - Piano Trio in C major, Op. 77 (1942)
  - Piano Trio in C minor, Op. 97 (1943)
  - Piano Trio in A minor, Op. 100 (1944)
- Richard Stoker
  - Piano Trio No.1, Op.24 (1964)
  - Piano Trio No.2, Op.35 (1969)
  - Piano Trio No.3, Op.59 (1980)
- Richard Strauss
  - Piano Trio No. 1 in A major, AV.37 (1877)
  - Piano Trio No. 2 in D major, AV.53 (1878)
- Rita Strohl
  - Piano Trio No. 1 in G minor (1884)
  - Piano Trio No. 2 in D minor
- Constantinos Stylianou
  - Pride (2008)
- Ananda Sukarlan
  - A Love Song (2016, originally the second movement of his Chamber Symphony no.2 for 10 instruments)
  - Trio from the opera "Saidjah & Adinda" (2017)
- Josef Suk
  - Piano Trio in C minor, Op. 2 (1889)
  - Elegie for Piano Trio, Op. 23 (1902)
- Sveinbjörn Sveinbjörnsson
  - Piano Trio in A minor
  - Piano Trio in E minor
- Georgy Sviridov
  - Piano Trio in A minor, Op. 61 (1945 - rev. 1955)
- Tomáš Svoboda
  - Passacaglia & Fugue, Op. 87
  - Phantasy, Op. 120 (1985)
  - Trio (van Gogh), Op. 116 (1984)
- Edith Swepstone
  - Piano Trio in D minor
  - Piano Trio in G minor
  - Piano Trio in A minor
- Iris Szeghy
  - Poetische Studien (1984)

== T ==
- Ellen Taaffe Zwilich
  - Piano Trio (1987)
  - Pas de Trois for Piano Trio (2016)
- Germaine Tailleferre
  - Piano Trio (1917/1978)
- Jenő Takács
  - Trio-Rhapsodie Op. 11 (1926)
- Toru Takemitsu
  - Between tides (1993)
- Josef Tal
  - Trio for violin, cello & piano (1973)
- Sergei Taneyev
  - Piano Trio in D major, Op. 22 (1908)
- Hilary Tann
  - Nothing Forgotten (1997)
  - ... Slate, Blue-Gray (2012)
- Alexandre Tansman
  - Piano Trio No. 2 (1939)
- Andrea Tarrodi
  - Akacia for Piano Trio (2009)
  - Moorlands for Piano Trio (2018)
- Boris Tchaikovsky
  - Piano Trio in B minor (1953)
- Pyotr Ilyich Tchaikovsky
  - Piano Trio in A minor, Op. 50 (1882)
- Thomas Tellefsen
  - Piano Trio in B♭ major, Op. 31 (1861-1862)
- Sigismond Thalberg
  - Piano Trio in A major, Op. 69
- Louis Thirion
  - Piano Trio in A minor, Op.11 (1911)
- Augusta Read Thomas
  - ...a circle around the sun... (2000)
  - Moon Jig (2005)
  - Klee Musings (2016)
- Francis Thomé
  - Piano Trio in A major, Op.121 (1893)
- Ludwig Thuille
  - Piano Trio in E♭ major for violin, viola and piano, Op. Post. (1885)
- Zlata Tkach
  - Piano Trio No. 1 (1961)
  - Piano Trio No. 2 (1996)
  - Piano Trio (2001)
  - Decem (2006)
  - Malagueña ausente (2016)
  - Spes (2020)
  - Piano Trio No. 2. Elegía española (2022)
- Donald Tovey
  - Piano Trio in B minor, Op.1 (1895)
  - Piano Trio in C minor, Op. 8, "Style tragique" (1895)
  - Piano Trio in D major, Op.27 (1910)
- Joan Tower
  - And ... They're Off for Piano Trio (1997)
  - Big Sky for Piano Trio (2000)
  - For Daniel for Piano Trio (2004)
  - Trio Cavany for Piano Trio (2007)
- Joan Trimble
  - Phantasy Trio for Piano Trio (1940)
- Karmella Tsepkolenko
  - Royal Flush - Card Game No. 1 (1992)
- Helena Tulve
  - lumineux/opaque (2002, for violin, cello, piano, 3 wine glasses)
- Joaquín Turina
  - Piano Trio in F major (1904)
  - Piano Trio No. 1, Op. 35 (1926)
  - Piano Trio No. 2 in B minor, Op. 76 (1933)
  - Circulo, for piano trio, Op. 91 (1942)
- Mark-Anthony Turnage
  - A short procession, for piano trio (2003)
- Marcel Tyberg
  - Piano Trio in F major (1935-1936)

== U ==
- Ludmila Ulehla
  - In memoriam for Piano Trio (1972)
- Erich Urbanner
  - "...in Bewegung..." Trio for violin, cello, and piano (1990)

== V ==
- Nancy Van de Vate
  - Piano Trio (1983)
- Pēteris Vasks
  - Episodi e Canto Perpetuo (1985)
  - Vientuļais eņģelis (1999/2019)
  - Plainscapes (2011)
- Octavio Vázquez
  - Piano Trio "Guernica" (2006)
- Lucie Vellère
  - Piano Trio (1947)
- Elizabeth Walton Vercoe
  - Despite our differences #1 (1984)
- Sándor Veress
  - Tre quadri (1963)
- Alice Verne-Bredt
  - Phantasie Trio (1908)
  - Piano Trio No. 2
  - Piano Trio No. 3
- Gabriel Vicéns
  - Sueños Ligados (2020)
- Alba Rosa Viëtor
  - Canzonetta (1939)
  - Piano Trio in A minor (1951)
- Heitor Villa-Lobos
  - Piano Trio No. 1 (1911)
  - Piano Trio No. 2 (1915)
  - Piano Trio No. 3 (1918)
- Carl Vine
  - The Village (2013)
- Pancho Vladigerov
  - Trio in B♭ minor, Op. 4 (1916)
- Robert Volkmann
  - Piano Trio No. 1 in F major, Op. 3 (1843)
  - Piano Trio No. 2 in B♭ minor, Op. 5 (ca. 1845)
- Aleksandra Vrebalov
  - Passion Revisited (2005)
- Victor Vreuls
  - Piano Trio in D minor, Op. 1 (1896)

== W ==
- Julian Wagstaff
  - A Persistent Illusion (2011)(Wagstaff: Breathe Freely | Linn Records)
- Gwyneth Van Anden Walker
  - Salem Reel (1989)
  - Craftsbury Trio for Piano Trio (or Clarinet, Cello, and Piano) (1990)
  - New World Dances (1992)
  - A Vision of Hills (2002)
  - Interval Games (2002)
  - Footsteps of Spring for Piano Trio, Narrator (2004)
  - Ladders to the Sky (2005)
  - The Race - A fable for Piano Trio and Narrator (2008)
  - Mornings of Creation (2015)
  - The Northlands (2015)
  - Shadows and Light (2015)
  - Let Us Break Bread Together (2017)
  - Benediction: To Hold in the Light (2017)
  - Suddenly Calm (2017)
  - Shall We Gather at the River (2020)
  - Wayfaring Stranger (2020)
  - Where There Is Hope (2020)
- Joelle Wallach
  - Triad of Blessing
- Henry Waldo Warner
  - Piano Trio in A minor, Op. 22 (1907)
- Graham Waterhouse
  - Polish Suite, Op. 3 (1978)
  - Bei Nacht, Op. 50 (1999)
  - Canto Notturno (2009)
  - Bells of Beyond (2013)
- Karl Weigl
  - Trio (1938/39)

- Douglas Weiland
  - First Trio, Op. 22 (1995)
  - Second Trio, Op.32 "Pavey Ark" (2002)
- Mieczysław Weinberg
  - Piano Trio, Op. 24 (1945)
- Judith Weir
  - Piano Trio (1998)
  - Piano Trio Two (2003-2004)
- Lotta Wennäkoski
  - Kilpukka ja muita lauluja (2001)
  - Päärme ("Hem") (2014-2015)
- Kenny Wheeler
  - A little peace for piano trio (2002)
- Gillian Whitehead
  - Piano Trio (1972)
  - Piano Trio (2005)
- Charles-Marie Widor
  - Piano Trio in B♭ major, Op.19 (1874)
  - Soirs d'Alsace Four Duos for Violin, Cello and Piano, Op. 52 (1881)
  - Four Pièces for Violin, Cello and Piano (1890)
- Józef Wieniawski
  - Piano Trio in G major, Op. 40 (1885)
- Helena Winkelman
  - Diurne - a movement for piano trio (2018)
  - 12 Mico - Bagatelles (or: 12 Visitations) for piano trio (2020)
- Ermanno Wolf-Ferrari
  - Piano Trio No.1 in D major, Op.5 (1898)
  - Piano Trio No.2 in F♯ major, Op.7 (1900)
- John Woolrich
  - The Night will not draw on (2008)
  - Toward the black sky (1997)
- Charles Wuorinen
  - Trio for Violin, Cello and Piano (1983)

== Y ==
- Sergei Yuferov
  - Piano Trio in C minor, Op. 52 (1913)
- Isang Yun
  - Trio (1972/75)
- Ludmila Yurina
  - Klangillusion II (2002)

== Z ==
- Alla Zahaikevych
  - Trio (1991)
- Jeanne Zaidel-Rudolph
  - Wits Trio Tribute (2013)
  - Alma Mater (2017)
- Judith Lang Zaimont
  - Russian Summer (1989)
  - Zones - Piano Trio No. 2 (1994)
  - Serenade (adapted for Violin, Cello and Piano) (2008)
- Edson Zampronha
  - O Acorde Invisível (The Invisible Chord) (2010)
- Riccardo Zandonai
  - Trio serenata per violino, violoncello e pianoforte
- Isidora Žebeljan
  - Sarabande (2001/13)
- Władysław Żeleński
  - Piano Trio in E major, Op.22 (1875)
- Alexander von Zemlinsky
  - Trio for clarinet (or violin), cello and piano in D minor, Op. 3 (1896)
- Marilyn J. Ziffrin
  - Piano Trio (1975)
- Hermann Zilcher
  - Piano Trio (1896)
  - Piano Trio in E minor, Op. 56 (1926)
- Agnes Zimmermann
  - Suite for Piano Trio in D minor, Op. 19 (c. 1873–1875)
- Bernd Alois Zimmermann
  - Présence. Ballet blanc en cinq scènes (1961)
- Đuro Živković
  - Piano Trio (2001)
- Mirjana Živković
  - Lyric Trio [Lirski trio] for Piano Trio (1979)
- John Zorn
  - Amour Fou (1999)
  - Hexentarot (2013)
  - The Aristos (2014)
- Emiliana de Zubeldia
  - Trio España for Piano Trio (published 1927)
- Otto M. Zykan
  - g-kettet (1996)
  - Drei Bagatellen (1998)

== Other combinations for Piano Trio ==
Many works also exist for less conventional groupings of instruments. Among the most notable are:

- Flute, cello and piano (Haydn Op 67, 73, Weber Op. 63 J. 259)
- Trio for flute, cello and piano in G major, Hob. XV:15 (Haydn)
- Trio for flute, cello and piano Op. 45 (Louise Farrenc, 1856)
- Flute, Bassoon and piano (Beethoven WoO. 37, 1786–90, published 1888)
- Clarinet-viola-piano trio (Mozart's Kegelstatt Trio, K 498)
- Clarinet-violin-piano trio (Bartók's Contrasts)
- Clarinet-cello-piano trio (Beethoven's Trio in B♭, Op. 11, Brahms' Trio Op. 114)
- Violin, horn and piano (Horn Trio (Brahms) and Trio for Violin, Horn and Piano (Ligeti) both list additional works in the medium)
- Trio for piano, oboe and horn Op.61 (Herzogenberg)
- Oboe, bassoon and piano (Poulenc)
- Paul Hindemith Trio for heckelphone (or tenor saxophone), viola & piano, Op. 47

Of these repertoires, pieces which include ossia parts for the conventional violin-cello-piano trio include:

- Ludwig van Beethoven
  - Trio for clarinet, cello, piano in B♭ major, Op. 11
- Johannes Brahms
  - Trio for violin, horn (or viola) in E♭ major, Op. 40
  - Trio for clarinet (or viola), cello, piano in A minor, Op. 114
- Max Bruch
  - Trio for clarinet (or violin), cello, and piano in c minor, Op. 5
  - Eight Pieces for clarinet (or violin), cello, and piano, Op. 83
- Mikhail Glinka
  - Trio pathétique, for clarinet (or violin), bassoon (or cello), and piano in D minor, G. iv173

Technically not piano trios, but pieces with ossia parts for the conventional violin-cello-piano trio are:

- Henriette Renié
  - Trio for harpe (or piano), violin and cello in B♭ major, IHR 17 (written in ca. 1901, published in ca. 1910)

== See also ==
- List of triple concertos for violin, cello, and piano
- String instrument repertoire
- List of solo cello pieces
- List of compositions for cello and piano
- List of compositions for cello and orchestra
- List of double concertos for violin and cello
- Clarinet-violin-piano trio
- Clarinet-viola-piano trio
- Clarinet-cello-piano trio
