= Clarinet trio =

Chamber music ensemble

A clarinet trio is a chamber musical ensemble that consists of a clarinet and two other instruments. Most commonly, the clarinet is combined with a piano and a bowed string instrument, such as a viola, a cello or a violin. In Western classical music, the clarinet-viola-piano trio, clarinet-cello-piano trio and clarinet-violin-piano trio have proven most popular, but many other combinations exist, with or without piano. A musical work for any of these ensembles is also called a clarinet trio.

== Clarinet–viola–piano trio ==
Wolfgang Amadeus Mozart was the first to write for this combination in his Trio for piano, clarinet and viola in E♭ major, K 498 (the Kegelstatt-Trio). Later, other composers followed his example, such as Max Bruch in his Eight Pieces for clarinet, viola and piano, op. 83.

== Clarinet–cello–piano trio ==
Ludwig van Beethoven was the first to write for this combination in his Trio for piano, clarinet (or violin) and violoncello in B♭ major, Op. 11 (the Gassenhauer-Trio) and the Trio for piano, clarinet (or violin) and violoncello in E♭ major, op. 38 (an arrangement of his Septet). Later, other composers followed his example, such as Johannes Brahms in his Trio for piano, clarinet (or viola) and violoncello in A minor, op. 114.

== Clarinet–violin–piano trio ==
A 20th-century addition to the clarinet trio genre, this combination was pioneered by Darius Milhaud in his Suite for violin, clarinet and piano, op. 157b (1936), and Béla Bartók in his Contrasts for clarinet, violin, and piano, Sz. 111, BB 116 (1938).

== Clarinet–violin–cello trio ==
The following is an incomplete list of trios for clarinet, violin and cello, with their composers in alphabetical order.

- Pierre-Hyacinthe Azaïs
  - 6 Trios for violin, violoncello and clarinet
- Theodor Blumer
  - Trio for violin, clarinet and violoncello, op. 55 (1932)
- Gabrielle Brunner
  - Trio for clarinet, violin and violoncello (2009)
- Adolf Busch
  - German Dances for clarinet, violin and violoncello, op. 26 no. 3
- Ingolf Dahl
  - Concerto a Tre (1946)
- Georg Friedrich Fuchs
  - 3 Trios for clarinet, violin and violoncello (no. 3 in G minor), op. 64 [published by Lemoine]
- Hans Gál
  - Serenade for clarinet, violin and violoncello, op. 93 (1935)
- Joseph Haydn
  - Trio for clarinet d'amour in B, violin and bass in E♭ major, Hob. IV: Es1
  - Trio for clarinet d'amour in B, violin and bass in E♭ major, Hob. IV: Es2
  - Trio for clarinet d'amour in B, violin and bass in B♭ major, Hob. IV: B1
- Nicolas Schmitt
  - 3 Trios for clarinet, violin and violoncello, op. 12
- Johann Baptist Wanhal
  - 6 Trios for violin, clarinet and violoncello, op. 10 (Paris, 1774)
  - 6 Trios for violin, clarinet and violoncello, op. 20 (Paris, 1781) (re-issue of the op. 10 trios)
  - 2 Trios for clarinet, violin and violoncello (London, ca. 1785)
- Michèl Yost
  - 3 Trios for clarinet, violin and violoncello [published by Viguerie]

== Clarinet–violin–viola trio ==
The following is an incomplete list of trios for clarinet, violin and viola, with their composers in alphabetical order.

- Johann Georg Distler
  - 2 Trios for clarinet, violin and viola (C major and F major), op. 7 (1804)
- Ada Gentile
  - Solo in trio per clarinetto, violino e viola (1982)
- Wolfgang Müller
  - Kleine Kammermusik für Klarinette, Geige und Bratsche (1994)
- Václav Pichl
  - Serenata for clarinet, violin and viola in F major
