= Clarinet–cello–piano trio =

Musical ensemble

A clarinet–cello–piano trio is a clarinet trio made up of one clarinet, one cello, and one piano, or the name of a piece written for such a group.

This formation is similar to the classical piano trio except that the violin is replaced by the clarinet. The heterogeneity of timbre between clarinet and cello prevents their use as a block against the piano, but it offers many other musical possibilities.

Long-lived trios (such as the Trio Montecino) are very rare, but the literature is performed by subsets of Pierrot lunaire and Quartet for the End of Time ensembles, such as Tashi, as well as by ad hoc groups.

== Repertoire ==
The original repertoire for clarinet, cello and piano (by name of composer with date & publisher where known) includes:

- Mark Abel (b. 1948)
  - Trio (2017)
- Johan F. Amberg (1846–1928)
  - Trio Op. 11 in E flat
  - Fantasiestucke Op. 12 (originally for viola, clarinet, piano)
- Georges Aperghis (1945)
  - Trio (1996)
- Edward Applebaum (b. 1937)
  - Montages (1969 Wilhelm Hansen/J&W Chester)
- Conrad Beck
  - Alternances
- Ludwig van Beethoven
  - Trio No. 4, Op. 11 in B flat
  - Trio Op. 38 (arrangement by the composer of the Septet Op. 20)
- Wilhelm Berger
  - Trio Op. 94 in G (1905, Kahnt)
- Günter Bialas
  - Moment musicaus III (1975–6)
- Adolphe Blanc
  - Trio Op. 23 in Bb major (1857)
- Karl-Birger Blomdahl
  - Trio (1955)
- Theodor Blumer
  - Suite (trio) Op. 97 (Zimmerman, n.d.)
- Johannes Brahms
  - Trio Op. 114 in A minor (optionally for viola)
- Braunlich
  - Trio
- Max Bruch
  - 8 Pieces Op. 83 for clarinet and viola, arranged for piano trio by the composer and often performed with clarinet and cello
- Howard J. Buss
  - Remembrances (2000 Brixton Publications/Cimarron Music Press)
- Ann Callaway
  - The Memory Palace (2007 Laureate Press, distr. BMM)
- Friedrich Cerha
  - Fünf Stücke (1999/2000)
- Osvaldo Coluccino
  - Without witness (2004, RAI Trade ed.)
- Milica Djordjevic
  - pod vodom raskršća snova (2019)
- Pascal Dusapin
  - Trio Rombach, for piano, violin or clarinet and cello (1997)
- Anton Eberl
  - Grand trio, Op. 36 (1806)
- Louise Farrenc
  - Trio Op. 44 in E flat (optionally for vln.)
- Benoit Constant Fauconier
  - Fantasie concertante, for flute or clarinet, violin and piano (publ. about 1820, Schott)
- Benjamin Frankel
  - Trio, Op. 10 (1940)
  - Pezzi pianissimi, Op. 41 (1964)
- Carl Frühling
  - Trio in A minor, Op. 40
- Beat Furrer (b. 1954)
  - Aer (1991)
- Daniel S. Godfrey
  - Impromptu (1984) (7', G. Schirmer)
- Henryk Górecki (1933–2010)
  - Lerchenmusik, Op. 53 (1984)
- Harold Gramatges (b. 1918)
  - Trio (1944)
- Christoph Graupner
  - in F major Clarinet / Cello / Cembalo (there is a trio, Gwv 201, for bassoon, chalumeau & continuo in C major)
- Emil Hartmann
  - Serenade Op. 24 in A
- Alfred Hill
  - Miniature Trio No.1 in F
- Gilad Hochman (b. 1982)
  - Shedun Fini — hommage to F. Schubert's Symphony in B minor
- Vagn Holmboe
  - Trio Op. 137 (1978)
  - Eco Op. 186 (1991) (both W. Hansen)
- Toshio Hosokawa
  - Vertical Time, Study I (1992)
- Klaus Huber
  - Schattenblätter (1975) — uses Bass clarinet
- Franz Hunten
  - Terzetto, Op.175
- Airat Ichmouratov
  - Fantastic Dances Op.15 for clarinet, cello, piano, and String orchestra with percussion (2007)
- Vincent d'Indy
  - Trio Op. 29 in B flat
- John Ireland
  - Clarinet Trio in D Major
- Paul Juon
  - Four Trio Miniatures (1901) version of piano Trio in A minor Op. 17 Op. 18, No.3, 6, & 7 originally for piano solo and Op. 24, No.2 for piano four hands.
- John Kaefer
  - Chamber Sonata No. 1: Shadow Voices [1994; 13 minutes]
- Robert Kahn
  - Trio, Op. 45 in G (1906)
  - Trio Serenade Op. 73 (orig. Horn-oboe-piano; version D for Clarinet–cello–piano)
- Harrison Kerr
  - Trio (1936)
- Jan Koetsier
  - Trio, Op. 13 No.2 (1937, rev. 1981 Donemus)
- Kubizek
  - Trio Op.26a
- Helmut Lachenmann
  - Allegro Sostenuto (1986–8) — clarinet doubling bass clarinet.
- Heinrich Eduard Josef von Lannoy (1787–1853)
  - Trio in B flat major, Op. 15
- J. X. (Borrel) Lefevre
  - Sonatas No. 2 and No. 3
- Kenneth Leighton
  - Fantasy on an American Hymn Tune, Op. 70 (Novello, 1974)
- Gerald Levinson (b. 1951)
  - Trio (Theodor Presser)
- Jacques Lenot
  - Lied 3
- Domenico Liverani (1805–1877)
  - Terzettino dal Trovatore de Verdi
- Charles Harford Lloyd (1849–1919)
  - Trio in B flat
- Theo Loevendie
  - Lerchen Trio (1992, in memoriam Olivier Messiaen)
- Bent Lorentzen
  - Mambo (1982, Edition Wilhelm Hansen)
- François-Bernard Mâche
  - Brûlis (1999; 16 minutes)
- Giuseppe Manghenoni (around 1800) / Johann Simon Mayer (1765–1848)
  - Trio per pianoforte con clarinetto (B) e Violone (Cello) [2 movements] (Musica-Aeterna Verlag, 2014)
- Philippe Manoury
  - Ultima (1996; 12 minutes)
- Krzysztof Meyer
  - Trio Op. 90 (1998)
- Robert Muczynski (1929–2010)
  - Op. 26 — Fantasy Trio, for Clarinet, Cello and Piano (1969, Theodore Presser Co.)
- Per Nørgård
  - Spell (1973)
  - Trio, Op. 15 (1955)
- Lior Navok
  - Like a Whirling Sand-Clock
- Robert Parris
  - Trio
- Günther Raphael
  - Trio, Op. 70 (1950)
- Ferdinand Ries
  - Trio Op. 28 in G (1810)
- Wolfgang Rihm
  - Chiffre IV (1983) — Bass clarinet
- Nino Rota
  - Trio (1973, Schott)
- John Psathas
  - Island Songs, clarinet trio (1995)
- Archduke Rudolph
  - Trio
- Paul Schoenfield (b.1947)
  - Trio for clarinet, cello and piano (1990)
- Hermann Schroeder
  - 3rd Piano Trio Op. 43
- Cyril Scott
  - Trio (c. 1955, Peters Ed. London)
- Roberto Sierra
  - Tres fantasías
- Robert Simpson
  - Trio
- Fantisek Jan Skroup
  - Trio, Op. 2 in E flat
- Juan Maria Solare (b. 1966)
  - Milongas grecolatinas (2002)
  - Pensierosa (milonga para tres) (2003)
  - Sale con fritas (2005)
  - Ochenta diciembres (2008)
- Robert Starer
  - Trio
- Eric Stokes (b. 1930)
  - Trio No.1 (1955, rev. 1963)
- Martin Suckling
  - Visiones (after Goya) (2015)
- Jay Sydeman
  - Trio Montagnana
- Marko Tajčević
  - 7 Balkan Dances
- Turok
  - Trio
- Victor Urbancic (1903–1958)
  - Trio in A-Dur nach Art einer Serenade (1921, Iceland Music Information Center)
- Karl Vollweiler
  - Fantasie on Russian Airs, Op. 35 in D minor
  - Trio on Italian Themes, Op. 15
- Julian Wagstaff (b. 1970)
  - A Persistent Illusion (2011, julianwagstaff.com)
  - Hebridean Sunset Rag (arrangement for piano trio, 2015, julianwagstaff.com)
- Gwyneth Walker
  - Craftsbury Trio
  - Salem Reel
- Robert Ward (1917–2013)
  - Echoes of America (1997, E. C. Schirmer)
- Graham Waterhouse
  - Gestural Variations
  - Concentricities (2019)
- Vally Weigl (1894–1982)
  - New England Suite (1953, American Composers Alliance)
- Harri Wessman
  - Trio for clarinet, cello and piano (1994, Fennica Gehrman, Helsinki)
- Jörg Widmann
  - Nachtstück
- John Woolrich
  - A Dramolet (2008, Faber Music)
- Alexander Zemlinsky
  - Trio Op. 3 in D minor
- Hermann Zilcher (see German article)
  - Trio in Form von Variationen a-moll Op. 90 für Klarinette, Violoncello und Klavier (1938)

== Substitution ==
In addition to this original repertoire, one can pick some pieces for clarinet-viola-piano trio or clarinet-violin-piano trio and replace the viola (violin) by the cello, or replace the violin by the clarinet in a classical Piano trio; cases where the composer has foreseen this possibility are listed above. Other substitutions are possible:

- Franciszek Lessel
  - Grand Trio, Op. 4 (Clarinet, Horn, Piano)
- Mikhail Glinka
  - Trio Pathetique for clarinet, bassoon and piano (1832, reprinted by Musica Rara as well as International Ed.)
- Giovanni Bottesini
  - Gran Duo Concertante (version for clarinet, string bass and Piano)
- Isang Yun
  - Rencontre (1986) for clarinet–cello–harp

== Transcription ==
The available repertoire has been expanded by transcribers (other than the composers, whose own transcriptions are listed under original repertoire above) as well:

- Johannes Brahms (Rosenbloom)
  - Three Pieces (Op. 76 #5, Op. 76 #4; Op. 116, #7)
- Anton Dvorak (Büsing)
  - Vier Legenden aus op.59 <Klar,Bassetthorn (or Vc), Pno>
- Engelbert Humperdinck (Sandre)
  - Hänsel und Gretel (Auswahl) in einer Bearbeitung von Gustave Sandre (ca 1909)
- Felix Mendelssohn-B., Felix (Päuler)
  - 3 Stücke op.35 No.4, op.53 No.2, op.38 No.6
- Robert Schumann (Büsing)
  - Bilder aus dem Osten op.66, 6 Impromptus <Klar,Bassetthr(Vc),Pno>.

== See also ==
- Clarinet–violin–piano trio
- Clarinet–viola–piano trio
- Piano trio
- Piano trio repertoire
