= Trio (music) =

Group of three musicians

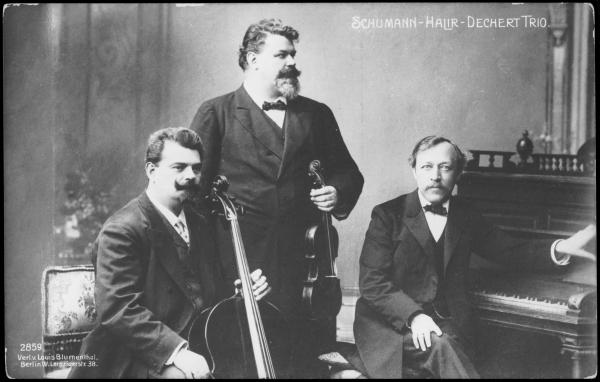
The Schumann-Halir-Dechert Piano Trio (violin, cello, and piano)

In music, a trio (from the Italian) is any of the following:

- a composition for three performers or three musical parts
- in larger works, the middle section of a ternary form (so named because of the 17th-century practice of scoring the contrasting second or middle dance appearing between two statements of a principal dance for three instruments)
- an ensemble of three instruments or voices performing trio compositions.

== Composition ==
A trio is a composition for three performers or musical parts. Works include Baroque trio sonatas, choral works for three parts, and works for three instruments such as string trios.

In the trio sonata, a popular genre of the 17th and early 18th century, two melodic instruments are accompanied by a basso continuo, making three parts in all. But because the basso continuo is usually played by two instruments (typically a cello or bass viol and a keyboard instrument such as the harpsichord), performances of trio sonatas typically involve four musicians. However, there are also examples for a single performer such as Bach's Organ Sonatas or Trios, BWV 525–30 for two hands and a pair of feet, and also for two performers, such as his Violin Sonatas, Viol Sonatas and Flute Sonata, in which the harpsichordist's right hand performs a melodic part.

In vocal music with or without accompaniment, the term terzet is sometimes preferred to "trio".

== Form ==
From the 17th century onward, trio has been used to describe a contrasting second or middle dance appearing between two statements of a principal dance, such as a minuet or bourrée. This second dance was originally called a trio because of the 17th-century practice of scoring it for three instruments, and later examples continued to be referred to as trios, even when they involved a larger number of parts. The Menuet of Bach's Brandenburg Concerto No. 1 (1721) is a late nod to the original practice, with trios for two oboes and bassoon as well as two horns and a third part played by three oboes in unison. 19th-century forms derived from the minuet, such as the scherzo, also often contain contrasting trios. It usually has a lighter texture than the principal statement of the dance or march.

The term is also used for the contrasting section of a march, the middle section in a march with da capo or the final section of one without. March trios in major typically modulate to the subdominant of the principal key.

== Ensemble ==
Derived from the compositions, trio often denotes a group of three solo instruments or voices. The most common types of such compositions are the piano trio of typically piano, violin and cello, and the string trio of commonly violin, viola and cello.

Other types of trio include:

- Brass trio (horn, trumpet, trombone)
- Clarinet–cello–piano trio (clarinet, cello, piano)
- Clarinet–viola–piano trio (clarinet, viola, piano)
- Clarinet–violin–piano trio (clarinet, violin, piano)
- Flute, viola and harp (flute, viola, harp)
- Harmonica trio (chromatic harmonica, bass harmonica, chord harmonica)
- Horn trio (valved or natural horn, violin, and piano)
- Jazz trio (piano or guitar, acoustic bass or bass guitar, drum kit)
- Organ trio (Hammond organ, drummer, jazz guitarist or saxophone)
- Power trio (electric guitar, bass guitar, drum kit)
