= Märchenerzählungen =

- Piano trio by Robert Schumann
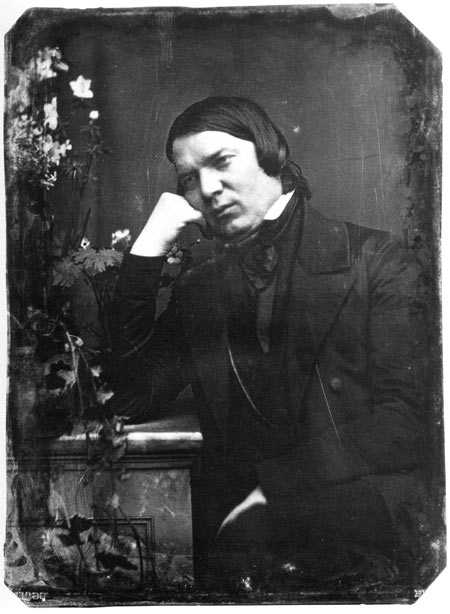
- Schumann in an 1850 daguerreotype
- Opus: 132
- Year: 1853
- Dedication: Albert Dietrich
- Published: 1854: Leipzig
- Movements: four
- Scoring: clarinet; viola; piano

Märchenerzählungen (Fairy tale narrations), Op. 132, is a trio composition by Robert Schumann in four movements for clarinet (violin ad libitum), viola and piano. He composed the clarinet-viola-piano trio in B♭ major, between 9 and 11 October 1853. The movements are connected by a motif (Kernmotiv). The work is dedicated to Schumann's pupil Albert Dietrich, and was published in 1854 by Breitkopf & Härtel.

== History ==
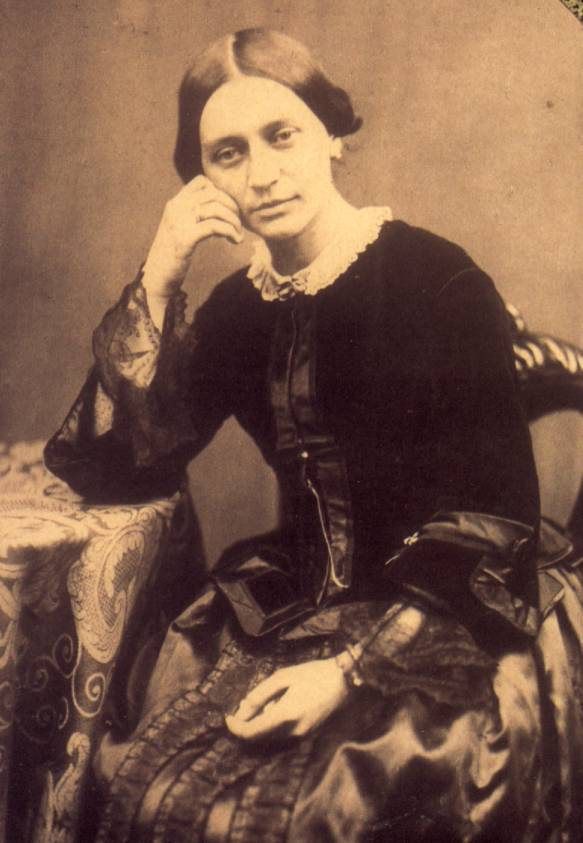
Clara Schumann, the pianist of the first performance, photographed in 1853, the year of the composition

The composition, one of Schumann's last works, uses the same combination of instruments as Mozart's Kegelstatt Trio. The composer was interested in the "picturesque and the fanciful", but left no link to specific fairy tales, as for his earlier Märchenbilder, Op. 113. The composition was completed in a few days. Clara Schumann noted in her diary: "Heute vollendete Robert 4 Stücke für Klavier, Klarinette und Viola und war selbst sehr beglückt darüber. Er meint, diese Zusammenstellung werde sich höchst romantisch ausnehmen." (Today Robert completed 4 pieces for piano, clarinet and viola and was very happy about it. He thinks that this compilation will appear highly romantic.)

The pieces were first performed privately by Clara as the pianist, the violist Ruppert Becker and the clarinetist Johann Kochner. A little later, Joseph Joachim presented them in public. The compositions were published by Breitkopf & Härtel shortly afterwards, and Schumann could present the first copy to the dedicatee, Albert Dietrich, in February 1854.

== Structure ==
The composition is structured in four movements:

1. Lebhaft, nicht zu schnell, 2/4
2. Lebhaft und sehr markiert, 2/4, G minor
3. Ruhiges Tempo, mit zartem Ausdruck, 3/4, G major
4. Lebhaft, sehr markiert, common time

The first movement is marked "lively, not too fast". It alternates march music and dreamlike sections. The second movement, to be played "lively and strongly stressed rhythms", frames a lyrical section with march music of "a distinct rustic flavour". The third movement, marked "reposeful tempo, with tender expression" is a love duet of clarinet and viola, with constant movement in the piano. The fourth movement is marked as the second, has another duet in its centre, and quotes in the end a theme from the first movement.

== Recordings ==
- Schumann: Märchenerzählungen, Tabea Zimmermann, Jörg Widmann, Dénes Várjon (Myrios 2016) Opus Klassik 2018, ICMA Winner 2019 – Chamber music, Diapason d'Or de l'Année 2018 Winner – Musique de chambre OCLC 1020860630 DNB-IDN 1153910527
