= Märchenbilder =

1851 composition by Robert Schumann

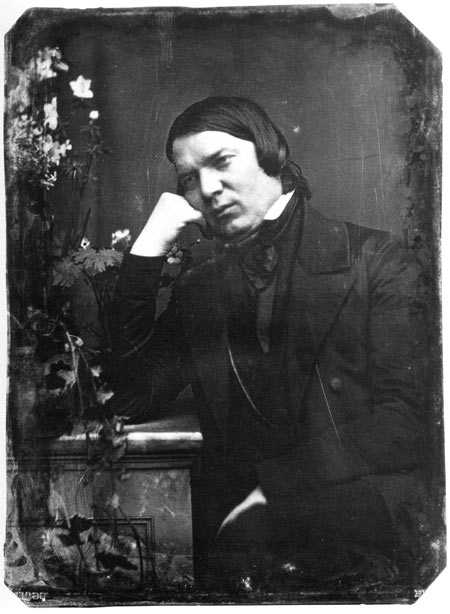
Robert Schumann in an 1850 daguerreotype

Märchenbilder or Fairy Tale Pictures, for piano and viola, Op. 113, was written by Robert Schumann in March 1851. The work is dedicated to the German violinist and conductor Wilhelm Joseph von Wasielewski. It consists of four character pieces and is an original composition featuring the viola from the Romantic period.

Schumann gives us few clues as to what creatures or events are depicted within each movement. His 1853 composition Märchenerzählungen for clarinet, viola and piano also leaves the details to the imagination of the performers and the audience.

The autograph manuscript of the work was purchased in May 2014 by the Library of Congress, where it is currently preserved.

== Movements ==
The work has four movements:

1. Nicht schnell (Not Fast) in D minor
2. Lebhaft (Lively) in F major
3. Rasch (Quick) in D minor
4. Langsam, mit melancholischem Ausdruck (Slowly, with Melancholic Expression) in D major

The fourth of these movements is based on a theme that resembles one introduced in the third movement of Beethoven's Symphony No. 9 (Op. 125). Whether this is coincidental is unconfirmed.

== Sources ==
- Margit L. McCorkle, Robert Schumann. Thematisch-Bibliographisches Werkverzeichnis, München-Mainz 2003, p. 160
- Klaus Martin Kopitz & Torsten Oltrogge, Ein Dichter namens Louis du Rieux und Schumanns „Märchenbilder“ op. 113. Annäherungen an einen geheimnisvollen Verehrer des Komponisten, in: Denkströme. Journal der Sächsischen Akademie der Wissenschaften, no. 11 (2013), p. 112–140 PDF
