= Harri Wessman =

Finnish composer (born 1949)

Harri Wessman (born 29 March 1949) is a Finnish composer. Born in Helsinki, he is best known outside Finland for his Concerto for Trumpet and Orchestra, and the choral work "Vesi väsyy lumen alle" (Water weary under snow), composed for the Tapiola Choir.
