= Clarinet Trio (Zemlinsky) =

Musical composition by Alexander von Zemlinsky

- Clarinet trio by Alexander von Zemlinsky
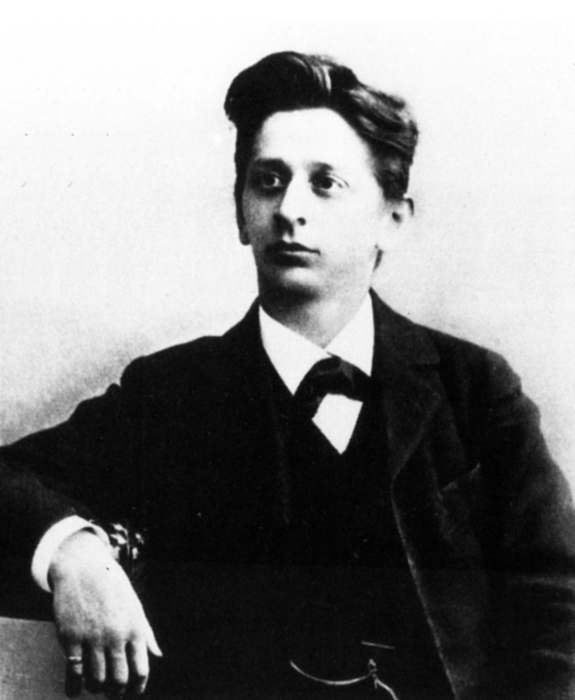
- Zemlinsky c. 1900
- Key: D minor
- Opus: 3
- Composed: 1896
- Dedication: Johann Nepomuk Fuchs
- Duration: 29 minutes
- Movements: three
- Scoring: clarinet (or violin); cello; piano

The Trio in D minor for clarinet, cello and piano, Op. 3, was written by Alexander von Zemlinsky in 1896. The composer also arranged the work for a standard piano trio consisting of violin, cello and piano.

== History ==
The trio was Zemlinsky's submission to a composition competition offered by the Vienna Tonkünstlerverein to all Austro-Hungarian composers, that asked for a chamber music work scored with at least one wind instrument. It is likely that this requirement originated from Johannes Brahms, the president of the Verein and one of the competition's judges, who had taken a recent interest in the clarinet, with works such as the Clarinet Trio, Clarinet Quintet, and the two Clarinet Sonatas.

As the competition's deadline was on 1 July, it is likely that the trio was composed in the first half of 1896. There is some evidence that the work started out as a standard piano trio, and that Zemlinsky replaced the violin with the clarinet at some point to match the requirements of the competition. Published editions by Simrock and Henle Verlag include a violin part as an alternative to the clarinet. In 2017, Henle Verlag issued a new edition correcting numerous errors in the original Simrock edition.

The Clarinet Trio was premiered on 11 December 1896, after the jury made an initial selection of works. On 22 December 1896, Zemlinsky was awarded third prize, along with 200 kronen (equivalent to $1,292 in 2025). The work was published by Simrock the following year, following a recommendation by Brahms, who added "I can recommend the man as well as his talent".

The trio was dedicated to Johann Nepomuk Fuchs, who had been Zemlinsky's composition teacher at the Vienna Conservatory. The autograph manuscript has been lost, and only some initial sketches remain.

== Structure ==
External audio
- Performed by Markus Hadulla, Wolfgang Meyer and Mischa Meyer
- I. Allegro ma non troppo
- II. Andante
- III. Allegro

The work consists of three movements:

1. Allegro ma non troppo
2. Andante
3. Allegro

The trio shows considerable influence of Brahms, and to some extent of Dvořák in its melodies. The playing time is around 29 minutes.

== Reception ==
Marc Moskovitz writes that the trio "shows the depth of his potential, for the first time fusing his impressive understated lyrical gift with his mastery of the art of developing variation."
