= Kegelstatt Trio =

1786 piano trio by Wolfgang Amadeus Mozart

- Piano trio by W. A. Mozart
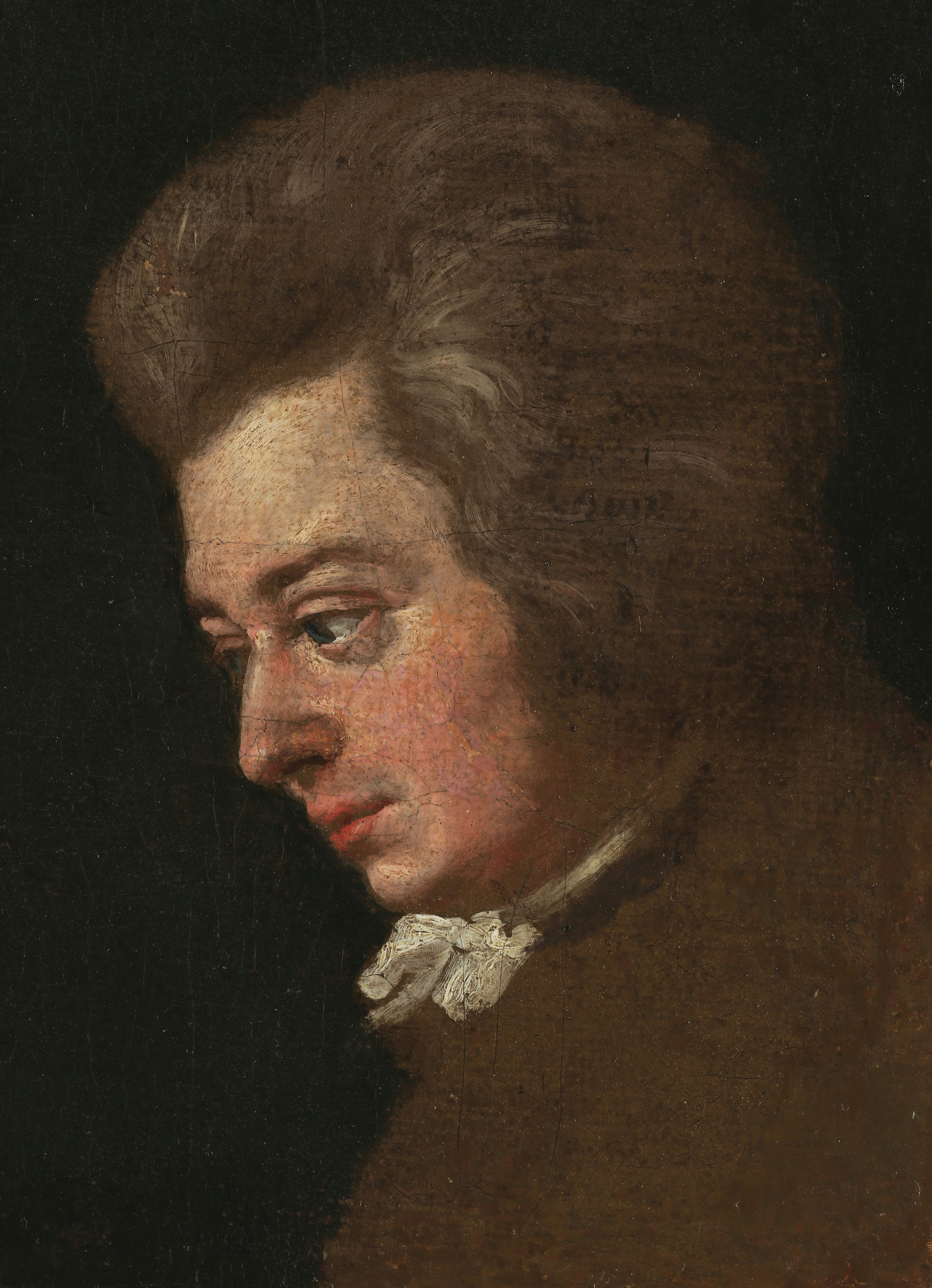
- Detail of Lange's 1782–83 Mozart portrait
- Key: E♭ major
- Catalogue: K. 498
- Composed: 5 August 1786: Vienna
- Dedication: Franziska von Jacquin
- Published: 1788: Vienna
- Movements: 3
- Scoring: clarinet; viola; piano

The Kegelstatt Trio, K. 498, is a piano trio for clarinet, viola and piano in E♭ major by Wolfgang Amadeus Mozart.

== History ==
Mozart wrote the piano trio on 10 sheets (19 pages) in Vienna and dated the manuscript on 5 August 1786. According to Mozart's 17-year-old student Karoline Pichler, the work was dedicated to another student of Mozart's, Franziska von Jacquin; Mozart and the von Jacquin family – father Nikolaus Joseph von Jacquin and his youngest son Gottfried – were quite close friends. They performed house concerts together, where Nikolaus played the flute and Franziska the piano. In a letter to Gottfried from 15 January 1787, Mozart praises Franziska's studiousness and diligence. Mozart dedicated a number of works to the von Jacquin family. One year later, Mozart wrote two Lieder, "Als Luise die Briefe ihres ungetreuen Liebhabers verbrannte" (K. 520) and "Das Traumbild" (K. 530) explicitly for Gottfried von Jacquin to use under his own name.

The German word Kegelstatt means "a place where skittles are played", akin to a duckpin bowling alley. Mozart wrote that he composed 12 Duos for Two Horns (not 2 violins as once thought, or basset horns as was commonly thought), K. 487, "while playing skittles"; on the first page of that composition, Mozart inscribed the following: Wienn den 27.^{t} Jullius 1786 untern Kegelscheiben [Vienna, 27 July 1786 while playing skittles]. A week and a half later, Mozart composed and dated the trio E♭ K. 498. He entered this work into his list of compositions simply as: Ein Terzett für klavier, Clarinett und Viola (A trio for piano, clarinet and viola). There is no evidence that Mozart gave any nickname to the K. 498 trio; the moniker Kegelstatt first appears ascribed to the K. 498 trio in Ludwig von Köchel's 1862 thematic catalogue of Mozart's music.

This clarinet–viola–piano trio was first played in the von Jacquin's house; Anton Stadler played clarinet, Mozart the viola, and Franziska von Jacquin the piano. The clarinet was still a relatively new instrument in Mozart's time, and this trio, along with his Clarinet Quintet and Clarinet Concerto (the latter two for basset clarinets in A), helped increase the instrument's popularity.

The trio was published in 1788 by Artaria, transcribed – probably with Mozart's consent – for violin, viola and piano, and the original clarinet part was described as an "alternative part": La parte del Violino si può eseguire anche con un Clarinetto. Due to this unusual scoring, the piece is sometimes adapted to fit other types of trios; e.g. a clarinet–violin–piano trio, a violin–cello–piano trio, a clarinet–cello–piano trio, or a violin–viola–piano trio, as in that first publication by Artaria.

No composer before Mozart had written for this combination of instruments. In the 19th century Robert Schumann wrote Märchenerzählungen (Op. 132), Max Bruch in 1910 "Eight pieces for clarinet, viola, and piano" (Op. 83) and Carl Reinecke "Trio for piano, clarinet and viola" (Op. 264). In the 20th century, the following works were written in the Kegelstatt trio formation: Jean Françaix "Trio" (1990), Bertold Hummel "Trio" op. 76a (1981), György Kurtág "Hommage à R. Sch." op. 15/d (1990).

In March 1894 the manuscript came into the possession of the musicologist and composer Charles Théodore Malherbe when he bought it from Leo Sachs, a banker in Paris, who had bought it in 1841 from Johann Anton André who bought it as part of a large purchase of manuscripts from Mozart's widow Constanze (the Mozart Nachlass) in 1799. In 1912 it was donated to the Bibliothèque nationale de France, Département de la Musique, Malherbe collection, Ms 222.

== Analysis ==
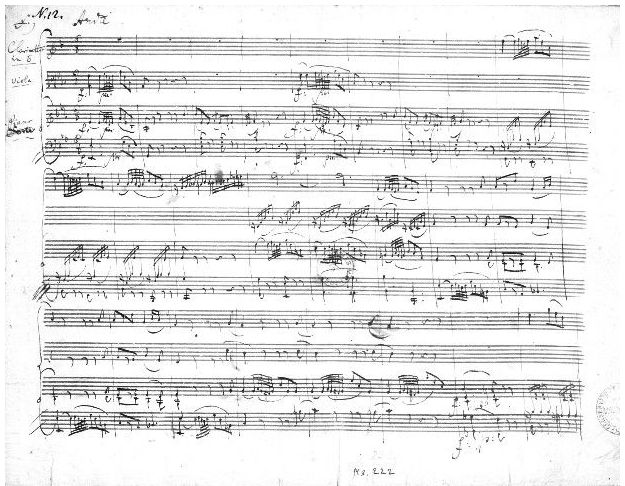
First page of the autograph

The manuscript notes the clarinet part as "Clarinetto in B" and uses the written pitch. The viola part uses the C-clef in the alto position. The labelling of the piano part shows a correction by Mozart where he started to write "Ce" (for "cembalo", the Italian word for the harpsichord) and then replaced it with "Piano forte". However, this part is labelled "Cembalo" for the second and third movements. The key signature of E♭ major in Mozart's late chamber music indicates close friendship.

The trio consists of three movements:

1. Andante
2. Menuetto
3. Rondeaux: Allegretto

The first movement is not the more traditional Allegro as an opening movement, but a more contemplative Andante. Following on from this, the second movement is of course not the traditional slow movement, but a moderate Menuetto, and the last movement, while lively, is not the standard Allegro. In short, the contrasts in tempo in this trio are not as stark as in most piano trios.

=== I. Andante ===
The Andante is written in the time signature of 6/8 time and consists of 129 bars; a typical performance would last just over six minutes. It repeats neither its exposition nor the remainder of the movement, which is unusual for Mozart's mature chamber music. A particularly recognizable feature of this movement's principal theme is the gruppetto (turn) which appears 67 times.

=== II. Menuetto ===
The second movement is written in 3/4 time and consists of 158 bars, almost all of which are repeated; a typical performance would last about six minutes. The key signature of this movement is B♭ major, the dominant key to E♭ from the first movement.

The opening menuetto of this movement consists of the exposition of a four-bar theme (bars 1–12, repeated), and its development (bars 13–41, also repeated). The piano's pounding bass line and sharp dynamic contrasts set the mood of this theme apart from any conventional light and frilly notions of a Minuet. During the development, the dialogue between the instruments becomes intensified, and Mozart shows his grasp of counterpoint without ever sounding academic or "learned".

The following trio opens with a chromatic four-note phrase, to which the viola responds with a run of lively triplets, accompanied by chromatic chords from the piano (bars 42–62, repeated). In the development of that theme, the four-note phrase and the lively triplets are then taken up by the piano, and clarinet and viola present some chromatically rising lines, before all three instruments start a concerto-like conversation where the 4-note phrase is only heard twice in the piano left hand (bars 63–94, repeated).

The final part of the trio starts with a variation of the trio's four-note phrase, which is briefly developed (bars 95–102) before returning to the brighter theme of the Menuetto whose treatment ends the movement without repeats.

=== III. Rondeaux: Allegretto ===
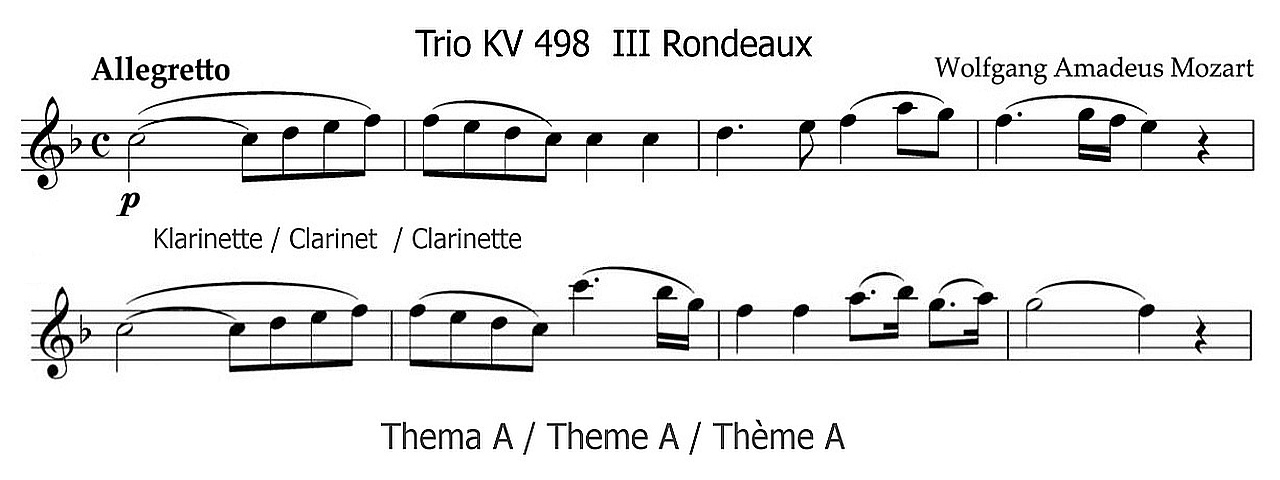

The last movement is written in the time signature of cut common time (or alla breve, similar to 2/2) and consists of 222 bars; a typical performance would last eight and a half minutes. The key signature, as is conventional, is the same as the opening movement, E♭ major. The musical format of this movement is a seven-part rondo, a rarity in Mozart's work; this seven-part structure also explains the title Rondeaux, the French plural form of Rondeau.

The structure is AB–AC–AD–A. Theme A is an eight-bar cantabile melody in two parts, drawn from the first movement and presented first by the clarinet, then taken up as a variation by the piano (bars 1–16). The melody of theme B – in B♭ major – is played once by the clarinet (bars 17–24) before the piano plays an intermezzo of several bars. From bar 36 onwards, all three instruments play short phrases of that theme in turn, followed by a piano solo until bar 50. Theme C – in C minor – is presented by the viola and repeated (bars 67–76); all three instruments develop that theme in bars 77–90 (repeated). This development visits the subdominant minor scale (vi) of F minor before ending in the relative key of C minor. Theme D – in A♭ major – is introduced in bar 116 by all three instruments almost in unison, and elaborately developed in bars 132–153 (repeated). In contrast to the previous development, this goes through the subdominant major scale (VI) of A♭ major. With the playful coda of bars 191 to 222, Mozart concludes the composition, "that does not merely satisfy the listener, but leaves him enchanted!"
