= Julian Wagstaff =

Scottish composer

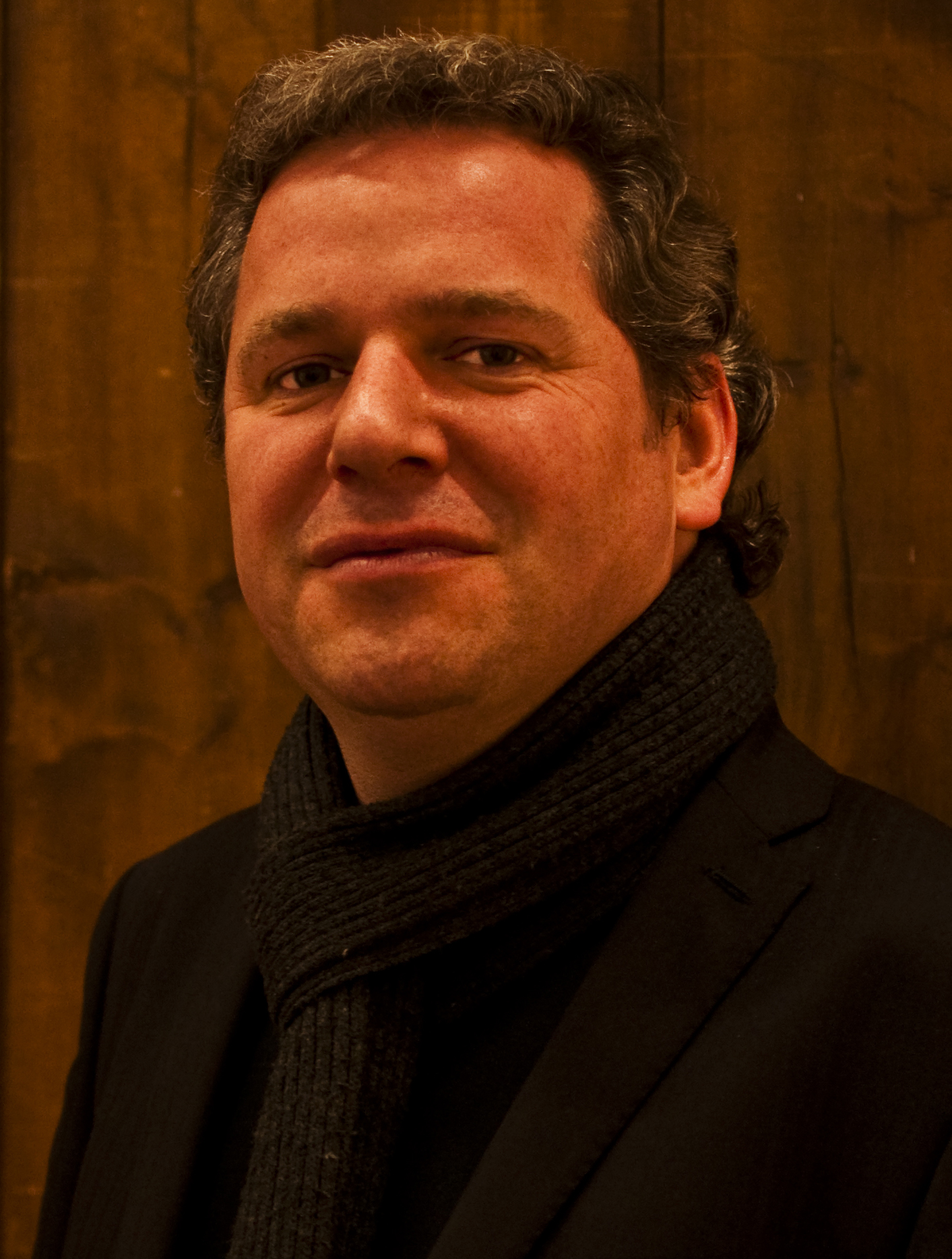
- Born: 1970 (age 55–56); Edinburgh, Scotland
- Occupation: Composer

Julian Wagstaff (born 1970) is a Scottish composer of classical music, musical theatre and opera.

Born in Edinburgh, Wagstaff originally studied German language and politics, and graduated from the University of Reading in 1993. Wagstaff worked as a translator and interpreter in the German language before turning to music as a profession in the late 1990s. His interest in language and political history continues to be reflected in much of his music and in his theatre libretti.

He came to public attention with the musical John Paul Jones (2001), based on the life of the Scots-born sailor and hero of the American Revolution. Premiered in Edinburgh in 2001, this was the first of the composer's works to reach a significant audience. In it, Wagstaff's eclectic compositional style (which frequently involves the integration of several different styles within one work) began to emerge. John Paul Jones was revived as a concert version in 2010 in association with the Scottish Chamber Orchestra.

The composer began to study musical composition at the University of Edinburgh with Professor Nigel Osborne in 2001, earning a master's degree in music in 2002 and a PhD in 2008.

Wagstaff's specific interest in German history, particularly the history of the former German Democratic Republic, is reflected in Treptow for string orchestra (2005), his most-performed work. This piece, which won the 2005 Emre Araci Prize, was inspired by the Soviet War Memorial in Treptow Park in east Berlin.

In August 2007, Wagstaff presented his hour-long chamber opera The Turing Test on the Edinburgh Festival Fringe. The opera takes its name from the test proposed by the English mathematician Alan Turing for human level intelligence in a machine. A recording of his Piano Quintet was released in the same year on an album by the Edinburgh Quartet recorded by Calum Malcolm entitled Frontiers and Bridges.

In 2011, Wagstaff was commissioned by the Royal Society of Chemistry to compose a new work to celebrate International Year of Chemistry 2011. The trio for clarinet, cello and piano is entitled A Persistent Illusion and was premiered by Hebrides Ensemble on 12 December 2011.

In 2013, the composer was commissioned by the University of Edinburgh to write and produce a short opera to celebrate the Tercentenary of its School of Chemistry which fell that year. The resulting work, entitled Breathe Freely, is set during the Second World War and premiered in the Assembly Rooms (Edinburgh) on 24 October 2013 in a production supported by Scottish Opera. A CD recording of the opera was released on the Linn Records label in October 2015.

In November 2021, the national German radio network Deutschlandfunk broadcast a 45-minute retrospective on Julian Wagstaff's life and work, presented by Martina Brandorff.

Wagstaff lives and works in his native city. His works are widely performed throughout Scotland and beyond.

Wagstaff writes and performs rock music under the name Jules Reed, including as a member of the band The Firrenes. His cousin is the writer Rich Johnston.
