= Clarinet–viola–piano trio =

Type of chamber music

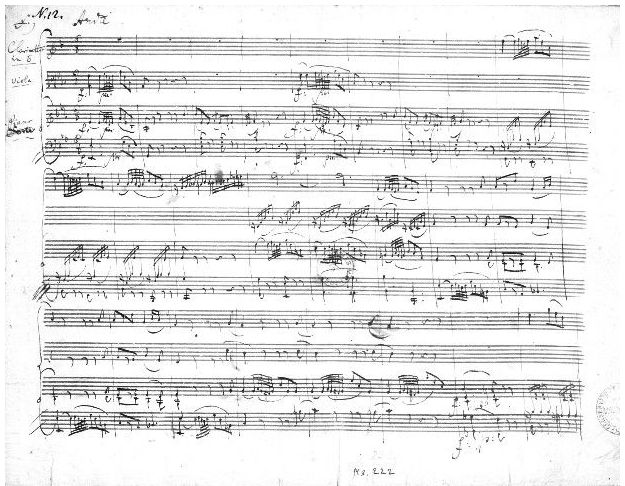
First page of the autograph manuscript of the Kegelstatt Trio for clarinet, viola and piano by Mozart

A clarinet–viola–piano trio, often titled "Trio for Clarinet, Viola and Piano" is a work of chamber music that is scored for clarinet, viola, and piano; or is the designation for a musical ensemble of a group of three musicians playing these instruments. This combination of instruments differs from other combinations, as the viola and the clarinet share approximately the same musical range, but not the same tone quality.

The Austrian composer Wolfgang Amadeus Mozart was the first to write for this combination of instruments with his "Kegelstatt" Trio, K. 498 (1786). which helped to popularize the clarinet in classical music. German composers Robert Schumann and Max Bruch also wrote early pieces for the clarinet, viola and piano; the combination has been increasingly written for during the modern era.

== Description ==
A clarinet–viola–piano trio, or trio for clarinet, viola and piano is a work of chamber music written for a musical ensemble consisting of a viola player (or violist), a clarinettist, and pianist. The term clarinet, viola and piano trio is also used as a description of these musicians.

This combination of instruments differs from the traditional piano trio instrumentation—for piano, violin and violoncello—and other combinations, such as for clarinet–violin–piano trio and the clarinet–cello–piano trio, as the viola and the clarinet share roughly the same musical range. The combination of viola and clarinet is distinguished by the tone quality of the instruments rather than by the register (i.e. the height of the pitch), as with a violin compared with a 'cello'.

The Austrian composer Wolfgang Amadeus Mozart was the first to write for this combination of instruments with his "Kegelstatt" Trio, K. 498 (1786). Mozart's Trio, along with his Clarinet Quintet, K. 581 (1789) and Clarinet Concerto, K. 622 (1791), were written when the clarinet was a relatively newly invented instrument. The three compositions featured the clarinet and were responsible for popularizing the instrument's use in chamber and orchestral works. German composers Robert Schumann (1810–1856) and Max Bruch (1838–1920) also wrote for the clarinet, viola and piano.

== Repertoire ==
Works scored for clarinet, viola, and piano have gained increasing popularity in the modern era. The repertoire includes:

- Kalevi Aho: Trio (2006)
- Johan Amberg: Fantasistykke (Fantasy Pieces), Op. 12 (1910)
- Milton Babbitt: Triad (1994)
- Bruce Babcock: Trio
- Nicolas Bacri: Trio "American Letters" (1994)
- Leslie Bassett: Trio (1953)
- Max Bruch: 8 Stücke (8 pieces), Op. 83 (1910)
- Howard J. Buss: Reverie (1992)
- Brett Dean: Night Window (1993)
- Rudolf George Escher: Trio (1978)
- Thierry Escaich: Trio américain (2002)
- Eric Ewazen: Trio
- Jean Françaix: Trio (1990)
- Anthony Girard: Trio (1991)
- David Philip Hefti: à la recherche... (2017)
- Philippe Hersant: Six Bagatelles (2007)
- Gordon Jacob: Trio (1969)
- John Jacobsson: Three pieces op. 45
- Nigel Keay: Trio in Four Movements "Adagietto Antique" (2009)
- György Kurtág: Hommage à R. Sch (1990)
- Franz Koringer: Sonata profana 5, divertimento ungherese (1974)
- Josef Labor: Trio No.2 for Clarinet, Viola, and Piano left hand (1919)
- Colin Matthews: Three Interludes (1994)
- Siegfried Matthus: Wasserspiele (2001)
- Wolfgang Amadeus Mozart: Trio in E♭ major "Kegelstatt", K. 498 (1786)
- Carl Reinecke: Trio in A major, Op. 264 (c. 1903)
- Julius Röntgen: Trio in E♭ major (1921)
- Leo Smit: Trio (1938)
- Heinrich Kaspar Schmid: Trio, Op. 114 (1944)
- Robert Schumann: Märchenerzählungen, Op. 132 (1853)
- Elliott Schwartz: Vienna Dreams (1998)
- Walter Skolnik: Trio
- Roger Smalley: Trio (1992–1999)
- Juan Maria Solare: Sale con fritas (2005–2012)
- Richard Stoker: Terzetto, Op. 32 (1996)
- Alfred Uhl: "Kleines Konzert (1937, revised 1988)
- Huw Watkins: Speak Seven Seas (2011)
- Jörg Widmann: Es war einmal... (Once Upon a Time...) (2015)
- John Woolrich: A Farewell (1992)

=== Trios from concertos for viola or clarinet ===
Although not originally intended as a chamber music work, the works of several composers who have written concerti for viola and clarinet have been arranged for a trio with the orchestral part condensed and arranged for piano. Notably, the Double Concerto for viola, clarinet and orchestra, Op. 88 (1911) of Max Bruch has been arranged for viola, clarinet and piano. Other concertos with these solo instruments include a concerto by Aulis Sallinen and Alternatim (1997) by Luciano Berio.

== Transcriptions ==
- Johannes Brahms: Seven Piano Pieces transcribed by Paul Rosenbloom: Capriccio in F♯ Minor, Op. 76, No. 1; Intermezzo in B Minor, Op. 119, No. 1; Intermezzo in E Minor, Op. 119, No. 2; Intermezzo in A Major, Op. 118, No. 2; Intermezzo in A Minor, Op. 116, No. 2; Intermezzo in C Major, Op. 119, No. 3; Capriccio in G Minor, Op. 116, No. 3
- Edmund Neupert: Three Miniatures, Op. 26, Nos 1-3 transcribed by Paul Rosenbloom: Resignation; Elegy; Scherzo
- A Romantic Love Triangle: Three Romances, transcribed by Paul Rosenbloom: Clara Schumann: Romanze in A Minor, Op. 21, No 1; Robert Schumann: Romanze in F Major, Op. 28, No 2; Johannes Brahms: Romanze in D Major, So laß uns wandern, Op. 75, No 3

== See also ==
- Piano trio repertoire
