= Theodor Blumer =

German composer and conductor

Theodor Anton Blumer (24 March 1881 – 21 September 1964) was a German composer and conductor.

Blumer was born in Dresden. He studied composition with Felix Draeseke and W. Brookman at the Dresden Conservatory. In 1931, he became the conductor of the Dresden Radio Orchestra and subsequently moved to Leipzig to head the Middle German Radio Orchestra there for eleven years. He spent the rest of his life in Berlin.

Blumer's compositions include music for solo piano, string orchestra, and mixed chamber groups, as well as works for larger ensembles. These include a piano quintet, two violin sonatas, string trio (1928), a flute sonata, four woodwind quintets, a string quartet (in G minor, his opus 51), a comic opera Die Fünfuhrthee (The Five-o'Clock Tea) (produced in Berlin and Bremen in 1912) and a symphonic poem Erlösung.

Some of his chamber music has been recorded on three CDs on the label Crystal Records.
