= Piano Trio, Op. 11 (Beethoven) =

1798 musical work

Piano Trio
- "Gassenhauer"
- by Ludwig van Beethoven
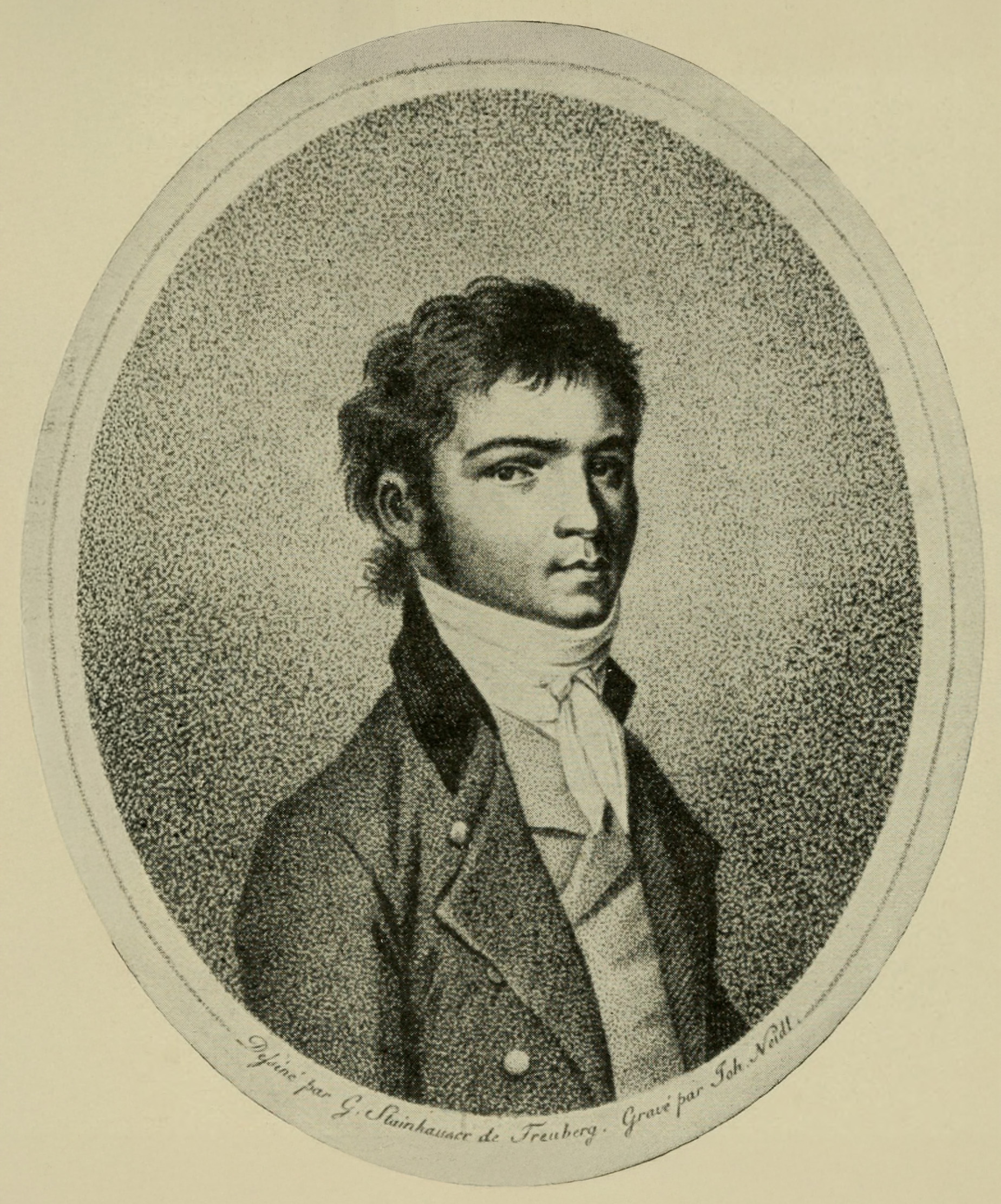
- Ludwig van Beethoven, c. 1796
- Key: B♭ major
- Opus: 11
- Composed: 1797
- Dedication: Maria Wilhelmine von Thun
- Published: 1798
- Duration: 18−20 minutes
- Movements: three
- Scoring: clarinet (or violin); cello; piano

The Piano Trio in B♭ major, Op. 11, was composed by Ludwig van Beethoven in 1797 and published in Vienna the next year. It is one of a series of early chamber works, many involving woodwind instruments because of their popularity and novelty at the time. The trio is scored for piano, clarinet (or violin), and cello (sometimes replaced by bassoon). The key of B♭ major was probably chosen to facilitate fast passages in the B♭ clarinet, which had not yet benefited from the development of modern key systems (such as the Albert system or Boehm system). Beethoven dedicated this piano trio to Countess Maria Wilhelmine von Thun.

The work is also sometimes known by the nickname "Gassenhauer Trio". This arose from its third movement which contains nine variations on a theme from the then popular dramma giocoso L'amor marinaro ossia Il corsaro (15 October 1797, Wiener Hoftheater) by Joseph Weigl. This particular melody, "Pria ch'io l'impegno" ("Before I go to work"), was so popular it could be heard in many of Vienna's lanes ("Gasse" in German). A "Gassenhauer" usually denotes a (normally simple) tune that many people (in the Gassen) have taken up and sing or whistle for themselves, the tune as such having become rather independent from its compositional origins. A rare word in contemporary German, rough modern equivalents of the term include "hit" (success) or "schlager". Other composers who used this melody include Joseph von Eybler, Johann Nepomuk Hummel and Niccolò Paganini.

Because of its unique scoring in Beethoven's output, there is some uncertainty as to whether to include it in the ordinal numbering of Beethoven's piano trios. Some assign it "No. 4" between the Op. 1 and Op. 70 sets while others leave the work out of the numbering.

== Structure ==
The trio is in three movements:

1. Allegro con brio
2. Adagio
3. Tema con variazioni ("Pria ch'io l'impegno": Allegretto)

Typical performances of the work last between about 18 and 21 minutes.
