= Clarinet–violin–piano trio =

Type of chamber musical ensemble

A clarinet–violin–piano trio is a standardized chamber musical ensemble made up of one clarinet, one violin, and one piano participating in relatively equal roles, or the name of a piece written for such a group.

An example of a clarinet–viola–piano trio existed several hundred years before the clarinet–violin–piano trio; Mozart composed the Kegelstatt Trio in the 18th century, and the Romantic composer Max Bruch composed a suite of eight pieces for this combination, as well as a double concerto for viola, clarinet, and orchestra. Many of these works can be (or already have been) transcribed for a clarinet–violin–piano trio.

Unlike a standard piano trio or a concerto, there is no standard form for a composition for a clarinet–violin–piano trio: a piece can have any number of movements.

Acoustically, the choice of a clarinet, violin, and piano is characteristic in that most chamber music (and most music in general) contains high (soprano), mid-range (alto/tenor), and low (bass/baritone) parts. However, both a clarinet and a violin play relatively high-pitched parts, making for a less-balanced sound than a trio that contains a more possible range, such as a violin–cello–piano trio. Timbral contrast is provided between the woodwind (clarinet), bowed string (violin), and keyboard instrument (piano).

Aside from its classical use, this combination of instruments is common in traditional Ashkenazi Jewish music.

== Early 20th century ==
There are examples of clarinet–violin–piano trios prior to 1970 by composers including Bartók (Contrasts), Baußnern's Serenade, Stravinsky (an arrangement of his L'histoire du soldat), Milhaud (Suite for clarinet, violin, and piano, Op. 157b), Khachaturian (Trio for clarinet, violin and piano), Berg, Krenek, and Ives.

=== Bartók's Contrasts ===
Béla Bartók's Contrasts was commissioned for violinist Joseph Szigeti and clarinetist Benny Goodman and is one of the best known pieces in the genre. Kárpáti describes the piece as possessing "technical bravura and at the same time...poetic versatility". In contrast, E.R., explains that the "contrasts are "of speed rather than of mood" but that despite this "lack of variety...Bartók's genius consists in gifts of rhetoric so rich that he can spread this one mood, and spread it interestingly, over a score or more of large-scale works".

Seiber considers it "a less weighty, less important work in Bartók's whole œuvre" though the "writing for both violin and clarinet" are "most effective throughout". An article describing a program in which "the standard note on Bartók's Contrasts...was replaced by a sequential, diagrammatic sketch," concluded that, "in fact, Bartók looks as inscrutable as he sounds".

== Later 20th century ==
Trios were commissioned by the Verdehr Trio from composers including Leslie Bassett, Alan Hovhaness, Michael Daugherty, Karel Husa, Thea Musgrave, Ned Rorem, Ida Gotkovsky, Gunther Schuller, Peter Schickele, Jennifer Higdon, Alexander Arutiunian, David Diamond, Scott McAllister, William Bolcom, Betsy Jolas, Bright Sheng, Roberto Sierra, Libby Larsen, Philippe Manoury, Gian Carlo Menotti, Peter Sculthorpe, Iván Erőd and Joan Tower.

Rorem's The End of Summer (1985), which may be found on several recordings featuring his work, features hints of church music. The composer describes the piece's similarities to its direct predecessor, his Scenes from Childhood, in that each of three movements is "suggested by musical works of yore. There are suggestions of Satie, Brahms, hopscotch ditties and Protestant anthems." Rorem says his, Musgrave's, and Dickinson's pieces all "quote literally from the past" and also describes asking "Chuck" if he ever disapproved of Samuel Barber's pieces as Rorem's partner did of Rorem's the evening it premiered.

Schuller's A Trio Setting, in "the classical fast-slow-scherzo-fast form" shows the influence of Bartók but is described as "original...varied, affecting and exciting by turns, and inventive" worth listening to again.

Nathan Currier's Variations is described as "more difficult" and seemingly "too long at almost 34 minutes." It repeatedly quotes as a theme a song from Binchois, "De plus en plus", sounding like a Brahms lullaby. The piece also shows the influence of Bartók's Contrasts.

Husa's Trio Setting [W22], commissioned by the Verdehr Trio in 1981, showcases each instrument in one movement and has been described by William Crutchfield as, "standout...with its sure sense of climax and dramatic variety in the instrumental handling."

Thea Musgrave's Pierrot was commissioned by the Verdehr Trio and first performed in Istanbul, Turkey, in 1986. Consistent with Musgrave's earlier work, such as her Second Chamber Concerto (1966), Clarinet Concerto (1967), and Space Play (1974), Pierrot is highly programmatic and the score contains indications for stage locations, lighting plots, and movements.

== Concertos ==
Clarinet–violin–piano concertos have been commissioned by Verdehr from Buhr, David, Ott, Skrowaczewski, and Wallace. They have also commissioned violin-clarinet double concertos from James Niblock, William Wallace, Dinos Constantinides, Paul Chihara, Ian Krouse and Richard Mills.

== Composers of clarinet–violin–piano trios ==
(This is an incomplete list.)

=== Early 20th century ===
Composer	Year	Piece	Opus	Notes
Béla Bartók	1938	Contrasts for Clarinet, Violin, and Piano	Sz. 111, BB 116	
Alban Berg	1926	Adagio for Violin, Clarinet and Piano		Arrangement of Kammerkonzert, 2nd movement
Charles Ives	1934	Largo for Violin, Clarinet and Piano		
Aram Khachaturian	1932	Trio for Clarinet, Violin and Piano		
Waldemar von Baußnern	1898	Serenade, for Clarinet, Violin and Piano	IWB 12	
Ernst Krenek	1946	Trio for Clarinet, Violin and Piano	Op. 108	
Darius Milhaud	1936	Suite for Clarinet, Violin and Piano	Op. 157b	
Igor Stravinsky	1918	Suite from L'histoire du soldat for Clarinet, Violin and Piano		Arranged by the composer

=== 1949 onwards ===
Composer	Year	Piece	Opus
Joan Albert Amargós			
Alfredo Aracil	1992	Movimiento perpetuo v.92	
Alexander Arutiunian			
William Bolcom	1994	Trio for Clarinet, Violin and Piano	
Charlotte Bray	2017	Chant for Clarinet, Violin and Piano	
Jane Brockman	1999	Nibiru Trio for Clarinet, Violin and Piano	
	2007	Lemuria Trio for Clarinet, Violin and Piano	
John Craton	2003	Sonate pour Violon, Clarinet and Piano, "Trois Petites Filles"	
Gustavo Díaz-Jerez	2012	Exedrae	
Donald Erb		Sunlit Peaks and Dark Valleys	
Iván Erőd	1991	Trio	Op. 59
Christopher Fox	1992	Straight Lines in Broken Times2	
Pedro Faria Gomes	2010	Returning	
John Harbison	1982	Variations	
Stephen Hartke	1997	The Horse with the Lavender Eye	
Douglas Knehans	2002	Rive	
Alan Hovhaness	1988	Trio Lake Samish	Op. 415
Evan Johnson	2003	Ausschnitte	
Michael Knopf	2014	QuasiHelioSonic & Little Worlds	
Philippe Manoury	1992	Michigan Trio	
Edward Manukyan	2007	Trio for Clarinet, Violin and Piano	
Donald Martino	1973	Trio for Clarinet, Violin and Piano	
Gian Carlo Menotti	1996	Trio for Clarinet, Violin and Piano	
Denis Pousseur	1993	Le Silence du Futur for Clarinet, Violin and Piano	
Manel Ribera	2008	Trio for Clarinet, Violin and Piano	
Ned Rorem	1985	End of Summer	
Timothy Salter	2017	Triptych for Violin, Clarinet and Piano	
Rebecca Saunders	1994	the underside of green	
Peter Schickele	1992	Serenade for Three for Violin, Clarinet and Piano	
Paul Schoenfield	1990	Trio for Clarinet, Violin and Piano	
Peter Scholes	1995	Island Songs, Clarinet Trio	
Peter Sculthorpe	1992	Dream Tracks	
Juan María Solare	2008	Greek Tales for Violin, Clarinet and Piano	
Franklin Stover	2011	Trialog for Violin, Clarinet and Piano	
Jesús Torres	2017	Fulgor for Violin, Clarinet and Piano	
Octavio Vázquez	2012	Trio for Violin, Clarinet and Piano	
Gabriel Vicéns	2021	Mural for Clarinet, Violin and Piano	
Johann Baptist Wanhal		Trio in E flat	Op. 20, No. 5

== Current clarinet–violin–piano trio ensembles (2018) ==
(This is an incomplete list.)

Trio	Founded	Clarinet	Violin	Piano
The Verdehr Trio	1972	Elsa Ludewig-Verdehr	Walter Verdehr	Silvia Roederer
The Ensemble da Camera of Washington	1990	Claire Eichhorn	Ricardo Cyncynates	Anna Balakerskaia
Nordica Trio	1994	Karen Beacham	Graybert Beacham	Martin Perry
Jacquin Trio	2009	Jessie Grimes	Kay Stephen	Charis Hanning
The Kat Trio	1998	Vladislav Gorbich	Victoria Gorbich	Joseph Ross
The Sapphire Trio	1998	Maxine Ramey	Margaret Nichols-Baldridge	Jody Graves
Strata	1999	Nathan Williams	James Stern	Audrey Andrist
Pamina Trio	2004	Beatriz Lopez	Ikuko Kitakado	Keiko Hattori
Prima Trio	2004	Boris Allakhverdyan	Gulia Gurevich	Anastasia Dedik
Trio Gaudì	2005	Alessio Terranova	Cardillo Giovanni	Silvia Nicola
Meridian Trio	2006	Helen James	Mackenzie Richards	Eamonn Ramsay
Zodiac Trio	2006	Kliment Krylovskiy	Vanessa Mollard	Riko Higuma
Vivezza Trio	2010	Nicole van Jaarsveld	Inger van Vliet	Angélique Heemsbergen
Jacquin Trio	2010	Jessie Grimes	Kay Stephen	Charis Hanning
Trio Aumage	?	Maguy Giraud	Geneviève Melet	Aurélie Samani
Tripod Trio	?	Rié Suzuki	Tim Schwarz	David Pasbrig
Aratos Trio	2014	Mihailo Samoran	Katarina Popović	Vanja Šćepanović
Luz y Sombra	2006	Kymia Kermani	Miriam Erttmann	Katja Steinhäuser
Ducasse Trio	2010	William Slingsby-Duncombe	Charlotte Maclet	Fiachra Garvey
Crescendo Trio	2014	Fanni Fekete	Eszter Kruchió	Ádám Zsolt Szokolay
Trio Pokret	2011	Miloš Nikolić	Madlen Stokić Vasiljević	Maja Mihić
Ensemble TrioPolis	2015	Kimberly Cole Luevano	Felix Olschofka	Anatolia Ioannides
Trio Émerillon	2017	Charlotte Layec	TJ Skinner	Olivier Hébert-Bouchard

== Sources ==
- Carbon, John. "Pierrot for Violin, Clarinet and Piano by Thea Musgrave", Notes, 2nd Ser., Vol.50, No. 2. (Dec., 1993), pp. 761–762.
- E. R. (1943) ."Review: Contrasts, for Violin, Clarinet and Piano by Béla Bartók", Music & Letters, Vol. 24, No. 1. (Jan., 1943), p. 61.
- Hitchens, Susan Hayes (1991). Karel Husa: A Bio-Bibliography. ISBN 0-313-25585-7.
- Kárpáti, János (1981). "Alternative Structures in Bartók's 'Contrasts'", Studia Musicologica Academiae Scientiarum Hungaricae, T. 23, Fasc. 1/4, Centenrio Belae Bartók Sacrum#.
- Max, Stephen R. "Verdehr Trio 3." American Record Guide 57.n6 (Nov-Dec 1994): 218(1).
- Rorem (2002). Lies: A Diary: 1986-1999. ISBN 0-306-81106-5.
- Seiber, Mátyás (1949). "Béla Bartók's Chamber Music", Tempo, New Ser., No. 13, Bartók Number. (Autumn, 1949), pp. 19–31.
