= Henle Verlag =

German publisher of sheet music

- Founded: 1948
- Founder: Günter Henle
- Country of origin: Germany
- Headquarters location: Munich
- Key people: Norbert Gertsch
- Publication types: sheet music; urtext editions
- No. of employees: 32
- Official website: www.henle.com

Henle Verlag is a German music publishing house specialising in Urtext editions of classical music. The catalogue includes works by composers from different epochs periods, in particular composers from the Baroque to the early twentieth century whose works are no longer subject to copyright. In addition to sheet music, Henle Publishers also produces scholarly complete editions, books, reference works, and journals. Since 1995, Henle the range also includes pocket scores (17 x 24 cm). In 2016 Henle began offering the Urtext editions in digital format in an app for iOS and Android tablets ("Henle Library").

== History ==
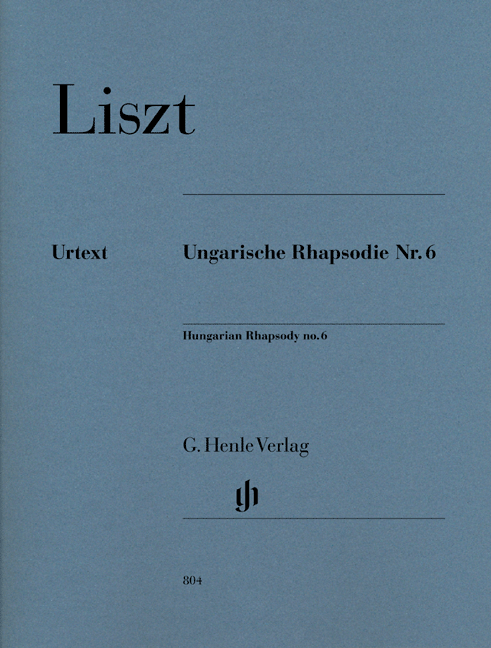
Current design for Urtext Editions (since 1999)

The publishing house Henle Verlag was founded on 20 October 1948 by Günter Henle with the permission of the US military government. The publishing house initially had offices in Duisburg and Munich. Under the direction of its founder, scholarly readings of musical sources and, based on this work, the editing, production and distribution of Urtext editions constituted the objective of the company from the very beginnings. The typical blue book cover, which is still used today, was chosen at that time, as was the design of the title font, created by Joseph Lehnacker (1895–1965). In 2000 the logo and title design were fundamentally modernised by communication designer Rolf Müller (1940–2015).

From the start, Günter Henle attached great importance to 'clear and precise engraving, a balanced arrangement of the pages, legible type-faces and aesthetically pleasing typesetting of the word parts. For several decades, music engraving was commissioned to the Universitätsdruckerei H. Stürtz (Würzburg), later other engravers in Leipzig and Darmstadt contributed. Towards the end of the 1990s, computer typesetting replaced manual engraving. Nearly all of the original engraving plates produces by the engraving workshops are still to be found in the publisher's archives.

Because of Günter Henle's involvement in large-scale industry, the publishing house was initially ridiculed as a 'Klöckner music factory' – Klöckner being a mass producer of steel and metal products – but it quickly developed to become an important German music publisher. The first publications to appear were Urtext editions of Wolfgang Amadeus Mozart's piano sonatas in two volumes, edited by Walther Lampe, and Franz Schubert's Impromptus and Moments Musicaux, edited by Günter Henle and Walter Gieseking. The founder of the publishing house maintained close contacts and friendships with Gieseking and numerous important musicians of his time, including Claudio Arrau, Erich Kleiber, Yehudi Menuhin, Igor Oistrakh, Arthur Rubinstein and Rudolf Serkin. Today, the publishing catalogue comprises around 1500 Urtext editions and some 750 scholarly publications, making it the world's leading publisher of Urtext music editions.

In 1955, the staff relocated to a newly acquired publishing house at Schongauer Strasse 24; 23 years later, in 1978, the publishing house acquired its present offices at Forstenrieder Allee 122 in Munich. The following year (1979), Günter Henle died, leading to the closure of the Duisburg offices and the expansion of the Munich subsidiary. In 1993, an upper floor was added to the building; in 2005 the ground floor was modernised.

The first managing director of the publishing house, alongside Günter Henle, was Friedrich Joseph Schaefer (1907–1981). He was succeeded in 1969 by Martin Bente (born 1936), first as commercial manager in the Munich branch, then from 1979 as managing director and head of publishing. In 2000, Wolf-Dieter Seiffert (born 1959) was appointed managing director and head of publishing. He had been chief editor or editor of the publishing house since 1990.

Music Engraving on Metal Plates (with sound)

The academic editing department plays a central role at the Henle publishing house. All Urtext editions are subject to strict scholarly and aesthetic criteria with regard to source and text criticism, correctness, beauty and user-friendly presentation of the music (pagination, fingerings etc.), as well as in terms of the stringency and comprehensibility of the prefaces and the critical apparatus. The following musicologists with doctorates have shaped or continue to shape the Urtext profile of the publishing house: Ewald Zimmermann (1910–1998), from 1953 to 1975 (also director of the Duisburg publishing office) (see also); Ernst Herttrich (born 1942) from 1970 to 1990; Ernst-Günter Heinemann (born 1945) from 1978 to 2010; Wolf-Dieter Seiffert (born 1959) from 1990 to 2000; Norbert Gertsch (born 1967) since 1997 (from 2009 at the same time deputy head of publishing and programme director); Norbert Müllemann (born 1976) since 2008 (chief editor since 2017).

In 1972 Günter Henle founded Günter Henle Stiftung München [the Günter Henle Foundation, Munich], which later became the owner of the publishing house. The Foundation was initially chaired by Henle himself and, after his death, by Walter Keim (1979–1981); he was followed 1981–1994 by Anne Liese Henle, wife of Günter Henle, and then C. Peter Henle (born 1938), son of Günter and Anne Liese Henle from 1994 to 2016. Since 2016 Felix Henle (born 1968), son of C. Peter Henle, has been chairman of the Board of the Foundation.

With the founding of the Joseph Haydn Institute in Cologne in 1955, in which Günter Henle played a decisive role, the Henle publishing house expanded beyond its Urtext editions to include the publication of other important scholarly complete editions and scholarly publications in book form.

In 1981, when the publishing house appeared at the first German Music Fair in Tokyo, Japan, G. Henle USA Inc. was also founded in North America, initially as a joint venture based in St. Louis, Missouri. From 1985, this sales office was continued as a sole subsidiary of the Munich parent company. Holger A. Siems (born 1942) became managing director, having been the sales manager of the publishing house since 1976. This branch was closed in 2007. Since then, Henle Verlag has been represented exclusively on the North American market by the Hal Leonard Corporation in Milwaukee, Wisconsin.

The publishing house also presented itself in China when it attended the first International Book Fair in Beijing in 1986. In 1995, it granted its first licence for sheet music production to the Chinese state publisher People's Music Publishing House in Beijing. To this day, numerous Urtext editions of Henle Verlag for the Chinese market are published under licence with this partner firm, as well as with the Shanghai Music Publishing House.

G. Henle Verlag is preparing a printed history of the publishing house for the anniversary year 2023.

== Henle Publications ==
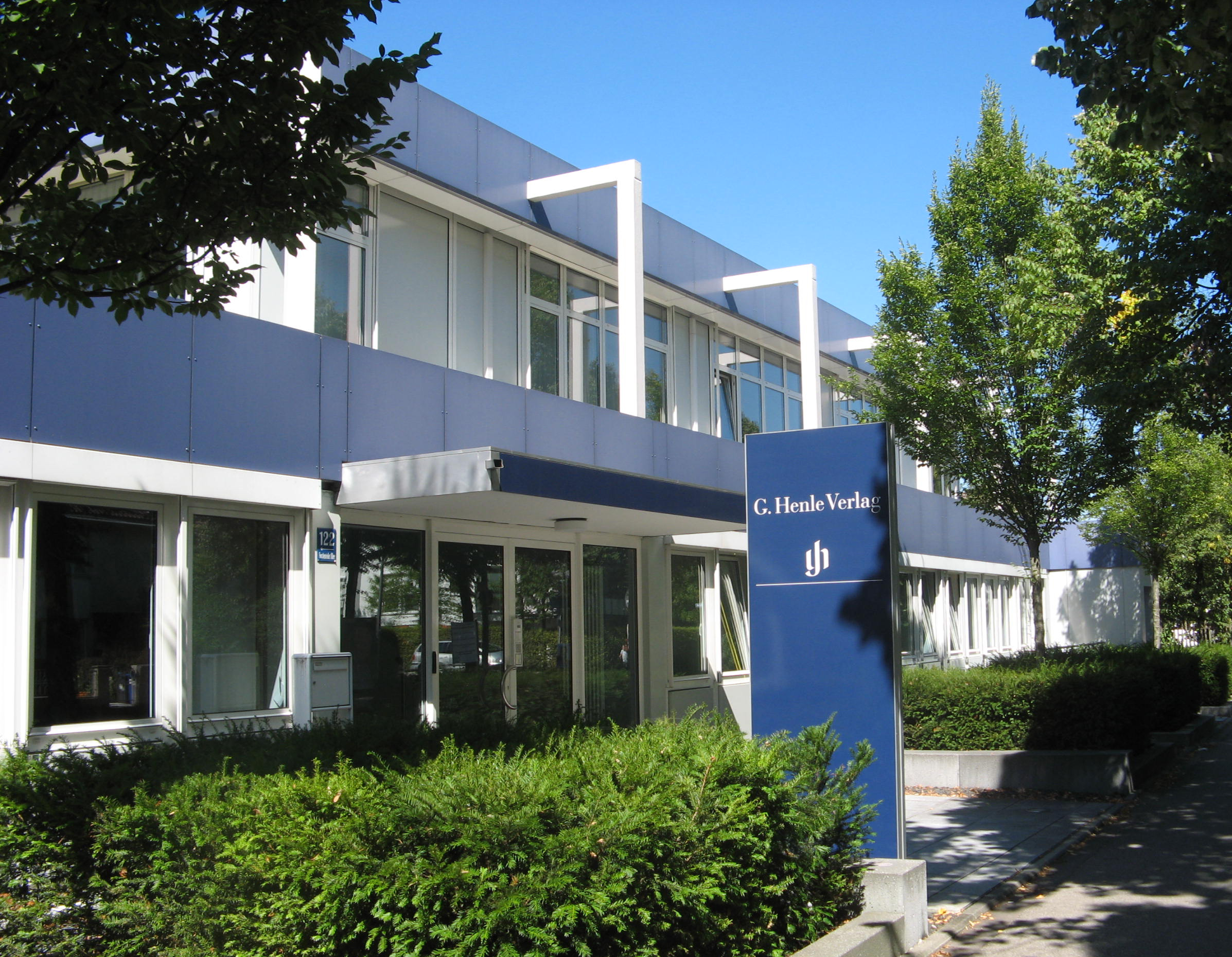
Henle Publishers building in Forstenrieder Allee in Munich

=== Urtext Editions ===
The heart of the Henle Verlag catalogue are the Urtext (original text) editions: musicologically researched, accurate musical texts for practising musicians, they contain an explanatory apparatus expounding on the sources consulted (autographs, copies, early printed editions) and on the readings chosen (‘Critical Report’). The Urtext programme covers almost the entire range of important piano music and chamber music for smaller orchestrations, complete piano works by J. S. Bach, Beethoven, Brahms, Chopin, Debussy, Joseph Haydn, W. A. Mozart, Schubert, Robert Schumann; in addition, numerous other selected piano works for two or four hands (including Dvořák, Granados, Grieg, Handel, Liszt, Mendelssohn, Rachmaninov, Ravel, Reger, Satie, Scarlatti, Scriabin and many more), as well as organ works and the entire standard repertoire for chamber music ensemble. In addition, there are complete editions of Beethoven's and Haydn's Lieder, and the principal song cycles of Robert Schumann. Urtext editions in small pocket format (the ‘Studien-Edition’ series), and several facsimile editions of composers’ manuscripts, are also a part of the Henle catalogue.

=== Level of difficulty ===
The entire repertoire of Henle Verlag for piano solo (author: Rolf Koenen), violin (Ernst Schliephake) and flute (András Adorján) has been classified in difficulty levels from 1–9. Easy (1–3), Medium (4–6), Difficult (7–9). For example, the Prelude in C major from The Well-Tempered Clavier I has been classified as "moderately easy" (grade 2 out of 9), and the Toccata, Op. 7 by Robert Schumann as "very difficult" (9 out of 9). This classification is intended to make it easier to find suitable pieces for a particular level of ability.

=== Special musicological publications and series ===
==== Complete Editions ====
- Joseph Haydn Works, ed. Joseph Haydn-Institut Köln. Munich, since 1958ff. Musicological complete edition of Joseph Haydn's works.The edition, which is planned for 111 volumes, comprises 34 series. The edition is close to being completed.
- Ludwig van Beethoven: Works. Complete edition, ed. Beethoven-Archiv Bonn. Munich, since 1961 (publications released by Beethoven-Hauses Bonn). The edition is planned for 56 volumes. Three quarters of these have been published so far.
- Johannes Brahms. New Edition of the Complete Works, ed. Johannes Brahms Gesamtausgabe, Munich, in conjunction with the Gesellschaft der Musikfreunde in Wien. Munich, since 1996. Historical-critical new edition of the complete compositional works of Johannes Brahms, with editorial management in Kiel. The edition is planned for 65 volumes in 10 series.
- Béla Bartók. BBCCE (Béla Bartók Complete Critical Edition), Munich (Henle Verlag) and Budapest (Editio Musica Budapest Zeneműkiadó), ed. Bartók-Archives of the Hungarian Academy of the Sciences. Since 2017. The edition is planned for 48 volumes and is trilingual (English, German, Hungarian; critical reports and footnotes in English only).

==== Musicological books and series ====
===== Ludwig van Beethoven =====
- Ludwig van Beethoven. Correspondence. Complete edition, ed. Sieghard Brandenburg, Munich 1996–1998. Volumes 1–6 cover letters from 1783 to 1827, volume 7 the index. Volume 8 (documents, subject index) is in preparation.
- Beethoven aus der Sicht seiner Zeitgenossen [Beethoven as seen by his contemporaries], ed. Klaus Martin Kopitz and Rainer Cadenbach, 2 vol., Munich 2009.
- Ludwig van Beethoven. Thematic Bibliographical Catalogue of Works, ed. by Kurt Dorfmüller, Norbert Gertsch and Julia Ronge with the additional support of Gertraut Haberkamp and the Beethoven-Haus Bonn, revised and significantly expanded new edition of the Catalogue of Works by Georg Kinsky and Hans Halm, Munich 2014.

===== Johannes Brahms =====
- Johannes Brahms. Thematic Bibliographical Catalogue of Works, ed. Margit L. McCorkle after conjunctual preparatory work with Donald McCorkle, Munich1984.

===== Joseph Haydn =====
- Haydn-Studies. Publications of the Joseph Haydn-Instituts Köln, since 1965. The journal is published irregularly.

===== Max Reger =====
- Max Reger Catalogue of Works, ed. Susanne Popp for the Max-Reger-Institut in collaboration with Alexander Becker, Christopher Grafschmidt, Jürgen Schaarwächter and Stefanie Steiner, Munich 2011.

===== Robert Schumann =====
- Robert Schumann. Thematic Bibliographical Catalogue of Works, ed. Margit L. McCorkle, Munich 2003.

===== Other publications =====
- Répertoire International des Sources Musicales (RISM), ed. under the patronage of the International Society of Musicology and the International Association of Music Libraries, Archives and Documentation Centres, Series B. Munich since 1960. RISM is a worldwide catalogue of musical, manuscript and printed sources preserved in all countries up to the year 1800 and beyond. The Henle Verlag publishes the systematically conceived Series B.
- The Legacy of German Music, ed. by Musikgeschichtliche Kommission e.V., Munich. Since 1964.
- Kataloge Bayerischer Musiksammlungen [Catalogue of Bavarian Music Collections], ed. by Bayerischen Staatsbibliothek, München, since1971.
- Scholarly Compilations, books and periodicals
