= Strophic form =

Type of song structure

"Das Wandern", the opening song in Franz Schubert's song cycle Die schöne Müllerin, an example of a strophic song.

Strophic form – also called verse-repeating form, chorus form, AAA song form, or one-part song form – is a song structure in which all verses or stanzas of the text are sung to the same music. Contrasting song forms include through-composed, with new music written for every stanza, and ternary form, with a contrasting central section.

== Etymology ==
Strophe is derived from the Greek word στροφή (strophḗ, "turn"). It is the simplest and most durable of musical forms, extending a piece of music by repetition of a single formal section. This may be analyzed as "A A A...". This additive method is the musical analogue of repeated stanzas in poetry or lyrics and, in fact, where the text repeats the same rhyme scheme from one stanza to the next, the song's structure also often uses either the same or very similar material from one stanza to the next.

== Format ==
A modified strophic form varies the pattern in some stanzas (A A' A"...) somewhat like a rudimentary theme and variations. Contrasting verse-chorus form is a binary form that alternates between two sections of music (ABAB), although this may also be interpreted as constituting a larger strophic verse-refrain form. While the terms 'refrain' and 'chorus' are often used interchangeably, 'refrain' may indicate a recurring line of identical melody and lyrics as a part of the verse (as in "Blowin' in the Wind": "...the answer my friend..."), while 'chorus' means an independent form section (as in "Yellow Submarine": "We all live in...").

== Examples ==
Many folk and popular songs are strophic in form, including the twelve-bar blues, ballads, hymns and chants. Examples include "Barbara Allen", "Erie Canal", "Michael, Row the Boat Ashore", and "Oh! Susanna" (A = verse & chorus). Traditional and modern Country songs like "This land is your land" is also a strophic form.

Many classical art songs are also composed in strophic form, from the 17th century French air de cour to 19th century German lieder and beyond. Haydn used the strophic variation form in many of his string quartets and a few of his symphonies, employed almost always in the slow second movement. Franz Schubert composed many important strophic lieder, including settings of both narrative poems and simpler, folk-like texts, such as his "Heidenröslein" and "Der Fischer". Several of the songs in his song cycle Die schöne Müllerin use strophic form.

== See also ==
- Antistrophe in the lyrical performances of the Greek chorus
