= Piano Trio No. 8 =

Piano Trio No. 8 may refer to:

- Allegretto for Piano Trio, WoO 39 (Beethoven)
- Piano Trio, Op. 38 (Beethoven), arranged from Septet, Op. 20
