= WoO 38 =

With regards to music, WoO 38 may refer to:

- Beethoven – Piano Trio in E-flat major
- Brahms – 20 Deutsche Volkslieder
- Draeseke – Symphony No. 4 in G major
- Raff – Juliet's Waltz by Ch. Gounod
- Ries – Recitative and Aria
