= WoO 39 =

With regards to music, WoO 39 may refer to:

- Beethoven – Allegretto in B-flat major
- Draeseke – 4 Lieder nach Grete Ihle
- Raff – J.S. Bach's Chaconne for solo violin, arranged for large orchestra
- Rheinberger – Friede
