= Oliver Korte =

German composer

Oliver Korte (born 10 April 1969) is a German composer, music theorician, musicologist and College professor.

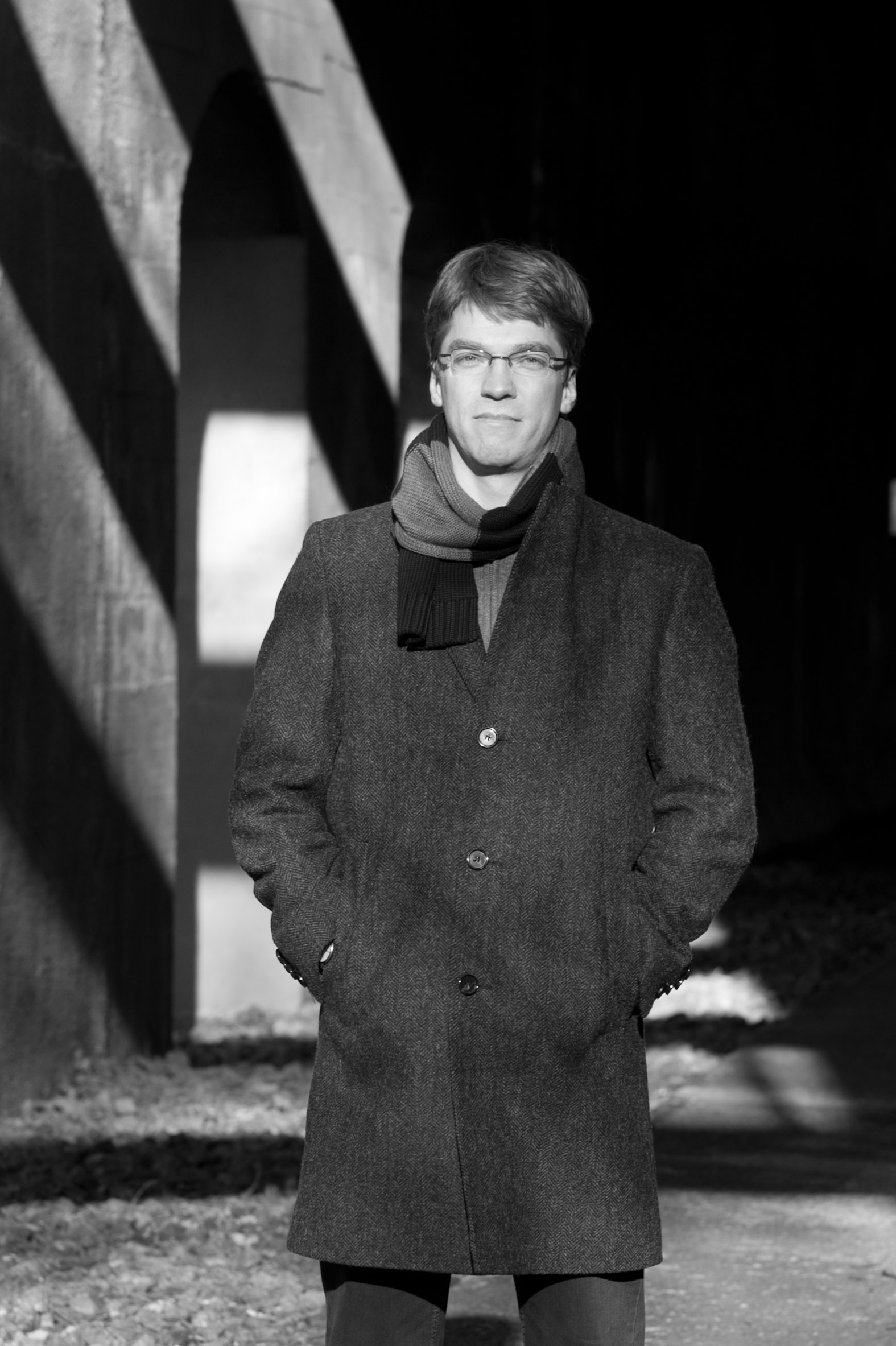
Oliver Korte (2012)

== Life ==
Born in Hamburg, Korte studied musical composition, music theory and musicology in Hamburg, Vienna and Berlin. Important impulses were also given to him by private composition studies with Gösta Neuwirth. His compositions have been awarded several composition prizes and scholarships. In 2002 he received his doctorate at Technische Universität Berlin with a thesis on the Ecclesiastical Action of Bernd Alois Zimmermann. After teaching positions at the Hochschule für Musik "Hanns Eisler" and at the Hochschule für Musik und Theater Rostock as well as a position as research assistant at the Universität der Künste Berlin he was appointed professor for music theory and ear training at the Musikhochschule Lübeck in autumn 2006. He is co-founder of the Society for Music Theory (GMTH) and editor of the Schriften der Musikhochschule Lübeck. In the winter semester 2017/18 he also taught as a visiting professor at the Johannes Gutenberg-University Mainz.

Kortes main work to date is the opera Copernicus for singer, narrator, orchestra and electronics, premiered in 2015 at the Festspielhaus Hellerau in Dresden. The composer calls the work an "opera spaziale" ("space opera"). This is due to the fact that a spatial concept is derived directly from the subject: strings, wind instruments and percussion, as well as loudspeakers and video projections are positioned in "Copernican rings" around the audience. The wind instruments, comparable to a planetarium, move into ever new acoustic constellations. Korte has assembled the libretto from various thespian original texts of the Renaissance as well as from some sound recordings of the 20th century. The work was received by critics as "multilingual, philosophical world theatre.

== Work ==
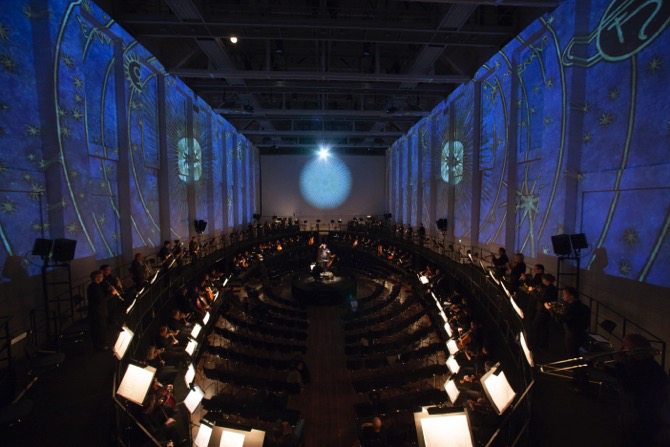
Oliver Korte, Copernicus, premiere (2015)

- Ways and Walls, Concerto for orchestra (1987/88, rev. ca 1991)
- Sechs Lieder after texts by Joachim Ringelnatz for mezzo-soprano and piano (1989, No. 3: 1995)
- Wintergesänge über acht japanische Haikus for soprano, alto, baritone, string trio, English horn, clarinet, piano, percussion (1990/91)
- Lichtstück for flute, clarinet, bassoon, 3 violins, 3 violas, 3 cellos, double bass, 2 percussionists (1991/92, rev. 2004)
- Music for a Wolf for marimba solo (1992)
- … aus der Asche for clarinet, horn, 2 percussionists, violin, double bass (1993)
- Trio for violin, clarinet and piano (1994)
- Szenen for Orchestra (1994–1996)
- zögern … schweigen for piano (1996)
- alles fort for 12 solo voices or 3 choir groups distributed in the room (1998/99)
- Lili Boulanger: Trois Morceaux (pour Piano), Orchestra version by Korte (1999)
- Glas, five elementary studies for 3 cellos (2000)
- Frost, three elementary studies for glockenspiel and piano (2001)
- Kies, three elementary studies for 4 clarinets (2002)
- rien nul – Musik für Samuel Beckett, for flute (also bass flute), clarinet (also bass clarinet), prepared piano, violin, viola, violoncello (2002)
- Kompass. Drei Himmelsrichtungen for cello solo (2003/07)
- Lili Boulanger: Hymne au Soleil, Rekonstruktion der Orchesterfassung by Korte (2003)
- Essay, Kantate für Sopran, Chor und Orchester (2003–2005)
- winterblau – löwenfarben for four-part mixed choir (2006)
- Die Elemente, Concerto for 2 percussionists and orchestra (2006/07)
- Epiphanie for small orchestra (2007)
- Einige Überlegungen zur Natur des Wassers for mixed choir (2008)
- Copernicus-Material for 18 solo strings (2011)
- Sechs Microloge for clarinet and piano (2012)
- Copernicus, Opera spaziale (2015)
- Epigramm – Kryptogramm – Piktogramm for a speaking drummer (2017)
- Lili Boulanger: Sous bois. Orchestra version by Korte (2018)
- Ill Angels for violin, bass clarinet, percussion and piano (2018)

== Discography ==
- 2003 – Jan Feddersen – Oliver Korte
  - Frost for glockenspiel and piano (2000),
  - Music for a Wolf for Marimba solo (1992)
  - zögern ... schweigen for piano (1996)
- 2010 – rien nul. Music for Samuel Beckett for sextet (2002) on the DVD supplement in the book publication Raum in den Künsten. Konstruktion – Bewegung – Politik, edited by Armen Avanessian and others., Munich 2010 (including pp. 167–174 also the article Leere Räume by Oliver Korte)
- 2012 – Oliver Korte. Elemente
  - Die Elemente. Konzert für zwei Schlagzeuger und Orchester (2006/07)
  - Kompass for Cello solo (2003/07)
  - Einige Überlegungen zur Natur des Wassers for Choir (2008)
  - Frost for glockenspiel and piano (2000)
  - Epiphanie for Kammerorchester (2007)

== Publications ==
- Chronik Alban Berg. In Anthony Pople (edit.): Alban Berg und seine Zeit. Laaber 1999, pp. 8–25.
- Zu Bernd Alois Zimmermanns später Reihentechnik. In Musiktheorie. Issue 1/2000, pp. 19–40.
- with Richard Grasshoff: Dekomposition. Eine Produktionsstrategie in Literatur und Musik. In Andreas Haus, Franck Hofmann, Änne Söll (edit.): Material im Prozess. Strategien ästhetischer Produktivität. Bonn 2000, pp. 123–136.
- Galina Ustvolskaya. Musik als geistliches Ritual. In Oliver Schwab-Felisch, Christian Thorau, Michael Polth (edits.): Individualität in der Musik. Stuttgart 2002, pp. 309–319.
- Die Ekklesiastische Aktion von Bernd Alois Zimmermann. Untersuchungen zu einer Poetik des Scheiterns. (Berliner Musik Studien. Volume 29). Sinzig 2003, ISBN 3-89564-102-2.
- Biagio Marini and Bernd' Alois Zimmermann. In Stefan Drees (edit.): Lexikon der Violine. Laaber 2003, pp. 414–416, pp. 776–777.
- with Klaus Martin Kopitz: "Written on his death-bed". Ein Beethoven-Autograph aus dem Besitz von Johann Andreas Stumpff. In Johannes Laas, Cordula Heymann-Wentzel (edit.): Musik und Biographie. Festschrift Rainer Cadenbach zum 60. Geburtstag. Würzburg 2004, ISBN 3-8260-2804-X, pp. 179–196, (books.google.com)
- Grundblatt Benjamin Schweitzer. In Hanns-Werner Heister, Walter-Wolfgang Sparrer (edit.): Komponisten der Gegenwart. 29. Nachlieferung, Munich 2005.
- "Eine äußerst komplexe Strukturierung der Klangfarbe“. Kompositorische Strategien in Bernd Alois Zimmermanns pas de trois. In Musik-Konzepte Sonderband Bernd Alois Zimmermann. Munich 2005, pp. –51.
- Antoine Brumel, Guilielmus Monachus. Falsobordone in Praxis und Theorie. In Hanns-Werner Heister, Wolfgang Hochstein (edits.): Musik und. Eine Schriftenreihe der Hochschule für Musik und Theater Hamburg. Neue Folge, Berlin 2008, pp. 247–259.
- Geographischer Ort und Ereignisraum. Tunjuk für großes Orchester. In Torsten Möller (edit.): „Wenn A ist, ist A“. Der Komponist Dieter Mack. Saarbrücken 2008, pp. 120–136.
- Beethoven aus der Sicht seiner Zeitgenossen in Tagebüchern, Briefen, Gedichten und Erinnerungen. edited by Klaus Martin Kopitz and Rainer Cadenbach unter Mitarbeit von Oliver Korte und Nancy Tanneberger. 2 volumes. Henle, 2009, ISBN 978-3-87328-120-2.
- Leere Räume. In Armen Avanessian among others. (Edit.) Raum in den Künsten. Konstruktion – Bewegung – Politik. Munich 2010, ISBN 978-3-7705-4658-9, pp. 167–174.
- Nacht und Licht. Die Kindertotenlieder In Korte, Peter Revers (edit.): Gustav Mahler. Interpretationen seiner Werke. 2 volumes. Laaber 2011, volume 1, ISBN 978-3-89007-045-2, pp. 467–497.
- Macrocosm – Microcosm. About the Influence of Mahler's Symphony No. 8 on the Work of Anton Webern. In Elisabeth Kappel (edit.): The Total Work of Art: Mahler's Eighth Symphony in Context. (Studien zur Wertungsforschung. Volume 52). Universal-Edition, Vienna 2011, pp. 202–213.
- Il y a un temps pour tout: la phase sérielle de Zimmermann. In Pierre Michel, Heribert Henrich, Philippe Albèra (edit.): Regards croisés sur Bernd Alois Zimmermann. Actes du colloque de Strasbourg 2010. Éditions Contrechamps, Geneva 2012, pp. 69–86.
- The seventh and eighth Sinfony. In Oliver Korte, Albrecht Riethmüller (edit.): Beethovens Orchestermusik und Konzerte. (Das Beethoven-Handbuch. Volume 1). Laaber 2013, pp. 174–215.
- Bordun und Parallelensatz. Zur Artikulation tonaler Felder bei Gustav Mahler. In Elisabeth Kappel (edit.): Das klagende Lied: Mahlers Opus 1 – Synthese, Innovation, kompositorische Rezeption. (Studien zur Wertungsforschung. volume 54). Universal-Edition, Vienna 2013, ISBN 978-3-7024-7182-8, pp. 164–200.
- with Holger Best: Eine Rundfunksendung von Mahler's Piano quartet movement A minor im Jahr 1932. In Nachrichten zur Mahler-Forschung. Nr. 66, Vienna 2013, pp. 43–50, ISSN 1608-8956
- Das Fauxbourdon-Modell im Choralsatz Johann Sebastian Bachs. In Birger Petersen (edit.): Johann Sebastian Bach und der Choralsatz des 17. und 18. Jahrhunderts. (ContraPunkte. Volume 1). Olms, Hildesheim 2013, pp. 40–50.
- Reconstructing Antoine Brumel: How to Bring the Chanson „Dieu te gart, bergere“ Back to life. In Journal of the Alamire Foundation. Vol. 8, No. 1, Spring 2016, pp. 165–179.
- Schattenklänge. Mikrotonality in Dieter Mack's Percussion concert "Wooden". In MusikTexte. Volume 150, August 2016, pp. 79–82.
- Von den Kreisbahnen des Denkens. Zum Libretto meiner Oper Copernicus. In Die Tonkunst. Issue 1/2017, pp. 34–40, ISSN 1863-3536
- Beethoven's Symphony Nr. 7, A-Dur, op. 92. Facsimile after the autograph from the Biblioteka Jagiellońska, Krakow, ed. and introduced by Korte, with a preface by Lothar Zagrosek, Laaber 2017, ISBN 978-3-946798-13-2.
- Subjekt und Gewalt. Das Dona nobis pacem aus Bernd Alois Zimmermann's Requiem für einen jungen Dichter. In Korte (edit.): Welt – Zeit – Theater. Neun Untersuchungen zum Werk von Bernd Alois Zimmermann. (Schriften der Musikhochschule Lübeck. Volume 2). Hildesheim 2018, ISBN 978-3-487-15664-4.
