= Das Wandern ist des Müllers Lust =

- Poem and song
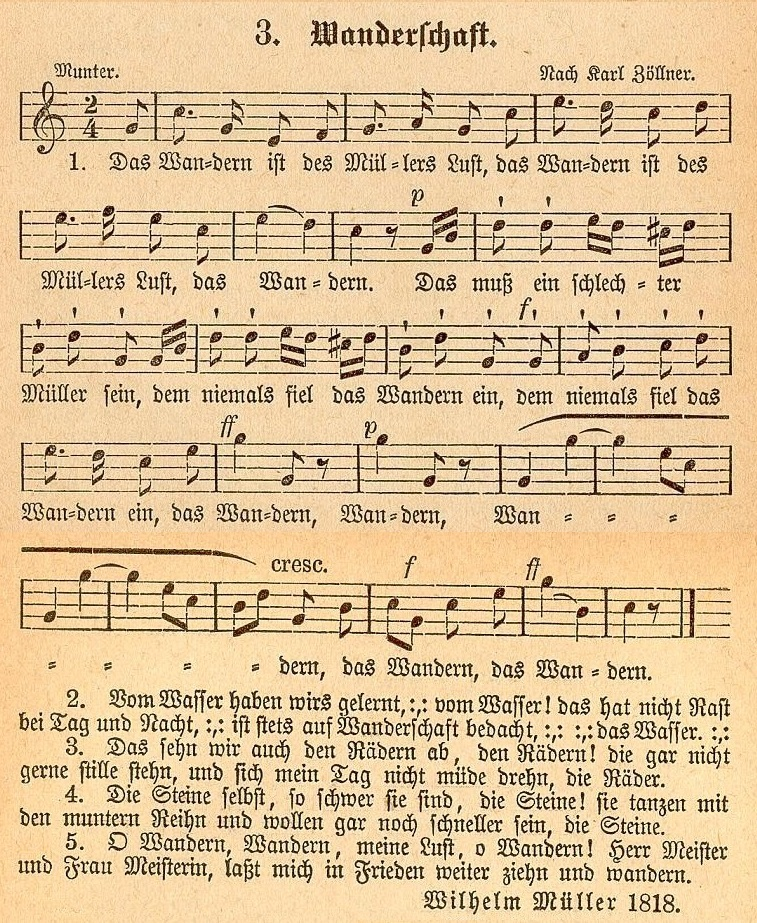
- Zöllner's melody in an 1877 song book
- English: To wander is the miller's delight
- Other name: "Das Wandern"; "Wanderschaft"
- Text: by Wilhelm Müller
- Melody: by Franz Schubert (1823); by Carl Friedrich Zöllner (1844)
- Composed: 1823

"Das Wandern ist des Müllers Lust" ("To wander is the miller's delight") is the first line of a poem by Wilhelm Müller, written in 1821 with the title "Wanderschaft" ("Errancy") as part of a collection, Die schöne Müllerin. While wandern often means "hiking" today, in this song it refers to a wandering journeyman miller.

The poem was set to music often, notably by Franz Schubert in 1823 titled "Das Wandern", as part of his song cycle Die schöne Müllerin, and by Carl Friedrich Zöllner, who wrote a four-part setting in 1844. With his melody, the poem became a popular German Wanderlied and Volkslied.

== History of the text ==
The beginning of the poetry is based on the play Rose, die schöne Müllerin, which premiered in the house of Friedrich August von Staegemann in Berlin in the fall of 1816. Inspired by Giovanni Paisiellos 1788 opera La molinara, Ludwig Berger wrote the plot as a Liedspiel. Berger requested more texts related to the topic, which Müller wrote during a study trip to Italy, completed in Dessau in 1820. In the context of the cycle, the beginning reflects, beyond the joy of Wandern, the scheme of wandering journeymen craftsmen, who often longed for rest. The text mentions in four short stanzas that "to wander is the miller's delight", comparing the steady restless motion of walking to that of the water driving mills, their wheels and stones, and asks in the fifth and last stanza leave from the master and his wife.

The poem was published in 1821 in Sieben und siebzig Gedichte aus den hinterlassenen Papieren eines reisenden Waldhornisten (Seventy seven poems from the bequested papers of a travelling hornist).

== Musical settings ==
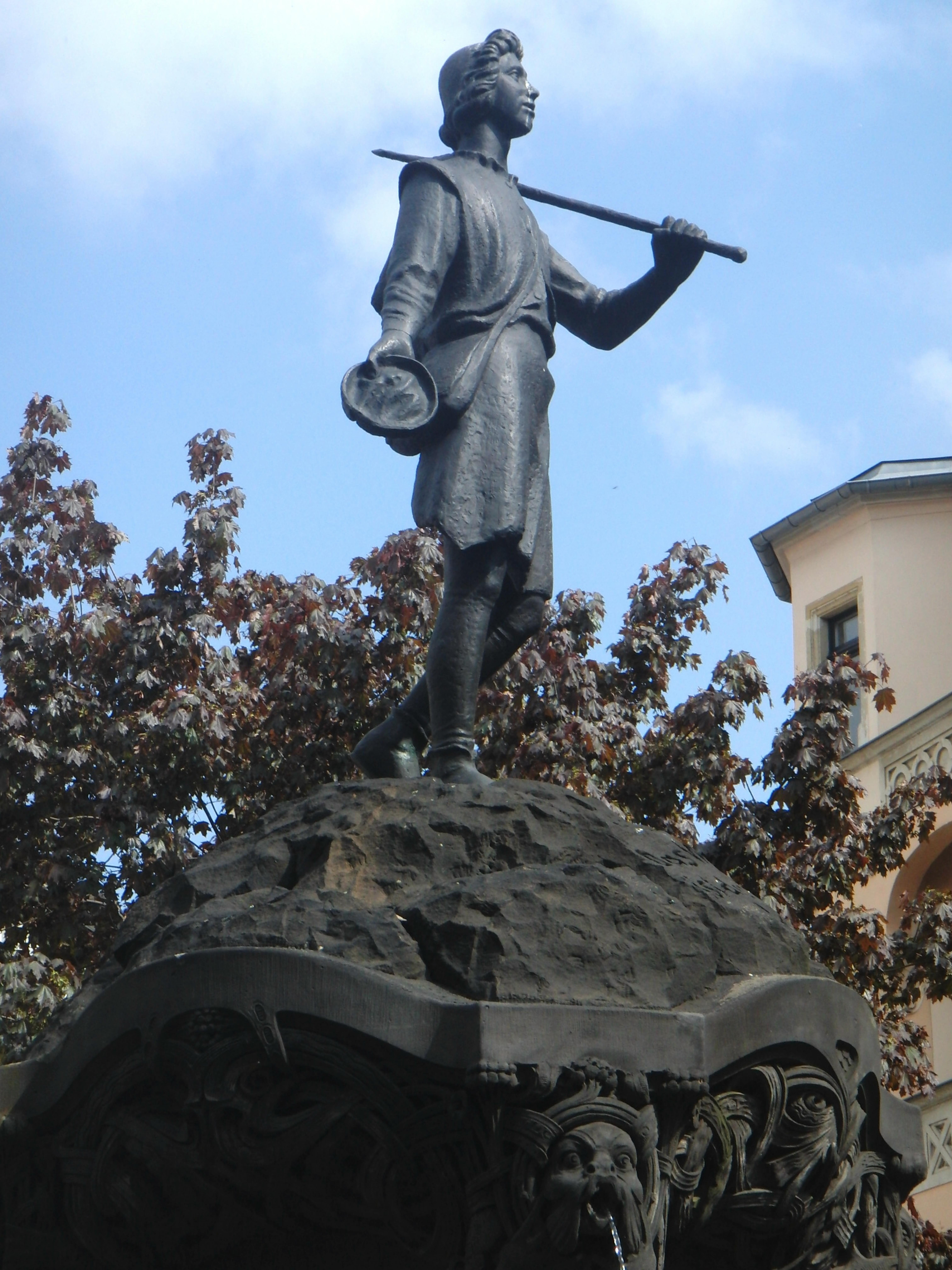
Müllerbrunnen (Miller's well) in Dresden

The poem was first set to music by Franz Schubert in 1823, titled "Das Wandern", as part of his song cycle Die schöne Müllerin, together with 19 other poems from the cycle. Several others set it to music, including Heinrich Marschner, Otto Nicolai and Karl Hellmuth Dammas.

In 1844, Carl Friedrich Zöllner composed a four-part setting for men's chorus. With his melody, the poem became a popular German Wanderlied and Volkslied (folk song). It was included in collections before 1900, such as Ludwig Erk's Singvögelein – Ein-, zwei- und dreistimmige Lieder [Little songbird – songs for one, two and three voices] which appeared in 1883 in its 59th edition, and in 1895 in Franz Magnus Böhme's Volksthümliche Lieder der Deutschen im 18. und 19. Jahrhundert [Folkloric songs of the Germans in the 18th and 19th centuries]. When the Wandervogel youth movement was founded in 1905, the song became part of many of its songbooks but not of the standard Der Zupfgeigenhansl. It remained popular, but was not part of typical Nazi songbooks. After World War II, the catalogue of Deutsches Musikarchiv listed around 350 recordings and 160 sheet music versions. It remained a favourite also in Austria and Switzerland.
