= Pauline Volkstein =

German composer (1849–1925)

- Born: 19 January 1849; Quedlinburg, Germany
- Died: 6 May 1925 (aged 76)
- Genres: Classical
- Occupation: Composer

Pauline Volkstein (19 January 1849 – 6 May 1925) was a German composer of more than 1,000 songs.

== Biography ==
Volkstein was born in Quedlinburg, Germany. She had little formal music training, but came from a musical family. Her mother had studied counterpoint with Friedrich Schneider, and her uncle was cellist and composer Bernhard Cossmann. Volkstein lived in Paris, Dresden, Murano, and Naples, before settling in Weimar with her sister in 1905. Her first songs were published around that time.

Volkstein set her own poems to music and also composed music for texts by poets Arndt, Bierbaum, Chamisso, Eichendorff, Falke, Fallersleben, Flaischlen, Fleming, Geibel, Gersdorff, Goethe, Greif, Halm, Groth, Heine, Keller, Kerner, Lenau, Liliencron, Lons, Morike, Muller, Opitz, Roquette, Saar, Schenkendorf, Storm, Uhland, and Wolff. She composed some pieces with piano or guitar accompaniment, but wrote many stand-alone melodies that were later arranged with accompaniments by other composers, such as Armin Knab and Justus Hermann Wetzel.

Volkstein self-published some of her music. Several of her songs with guitar accompaniment initially appeared in Der Wächter, a magazine associated with the German youth movement during the 1920s and 1930s. Her music was also published by Fritz Schuberth and Ries & Erler GMBH.

Volkstein's compositions include:

- 12 Folksongs (see External links)
- 12 Lieder
- 12 Lieder (piano setting by Justus Hermann Wetzel; see External Links)
- 20 Songs with Guitar Accompaniment
- 24 Folksongs with Simple Accompaniment
- Bloom, Dear Violet (arranged by Armin Knab)
- Jungfrau Zimperlich (text by Ludwig Pfau)
- Melodies (piano setting by Justus Hermann Wetzel)
- New Folksongs (1922)
- Piano compositions
- Spinning Song (arranged by Armin Knab)
