= James Taft Hatfield =

American philologist and professor

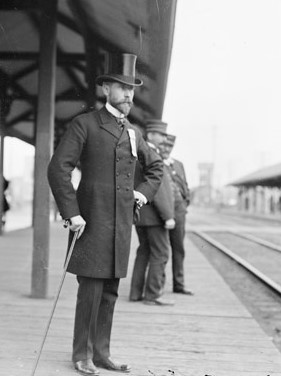
- Hatfield in 1902 at the Evanston, Illinois railway station
- Born: 15 June 1862; Brooklyn, New York
- Died: 3 October 1945 (aged 83); Cook County, Illinois
- Occupations: Philologist; Professor of German studies at Northwestern University

James Taft Hatfield (15 June 1862 – 3 October 1945) was an American philologist and professor at Northwestern University where for many years he was the head of the German Department. Although he also published works on comparative linguistics, Sanskrit, church music, and American folklore, he was primarily known for his contributions to German studies, and in particular his studies on the writings of Goethe and Wilhelm Müller and on the influence of German culture in the works of Henry Wadsworth Longfellow.

== Life and career ==
Hatfield was born in Brooklyn, New York into a family of prominent Methodist clergymen. After completing his secondary education at Rugby Academy in Philadelphia, he attended Northwestern University, receiving his BA in 1883 and his MA in 1886. Between 1884 and 1886 he also taught classics at Rust College and at the McCormack Institute, a private Methodist school in DeFuniak Springs, Florida. After further studies in China, India, Japan, and Germany, he attended Johns Hopkins University. There he continued his studies in classics under Henry Wood and was awarded a PhD in 1890. His doctoral dissertation on Gaius Vettius Aquilinus Juvencus, a 4th-century Roman Spanish Christian and composer of Latin poetry, was published as a book that same year and reviewed by Robinson Ellis in The Classical Review.

Hatfield began his main academic career in 1889 when was appointed Professor of Latin and Greek at Northwestern. He later became Professor of German Language and Literature there, remaining in that post until his retirement in 1934. However, during those years he also taught for various periods in European universities and in 1898 served in the Spanish–American War as a seaman on the US cruiser Yale as well as writing as a war correspondent for the Chicago Record. Hatfield had strongly held views on what he saw as the philistinism pervading American life of the time. In a 1902 address to the Modern Language Association he asserted that the "brutish" age of commercialism not only threatened academia itself, but also excluded its scholars from contributing to the nation's welfare. That same year he responded to criticisms in the Evanston press that Northwestern's academics were aloof from the social life of the town with a rebuke that was even covered in newspapers outside the state:

The real point of attack between the town and gown is the presumption of money, which has (occasionally perhaps) come to arrogate to itself the claim to control in spheres which do not lie in the jurisdiction of that unclean article. We spend our precious time in working over our science for the easier comprehension of people who have more real admiration for a Bradley-Martin dinner or a Vanderbilt ball than the genius of Aristotle or Goethe. Aren't these services worth more to the community than custards, highballs and ping-pong, or so-called 'social Evanston'? (Note: In the quote, Hatfield is referring to the lavish social events hosted by the Vanderbilt and Bradley-Martin families in New York.)

In 1934, the year of his retirement from Northwestern, Hatfield was elected President of the Modern Language Association. His presidential address was characterised by literary scholar Jeffrey L. Sammons as "a conservative attack" on the threat to undergraduate curriculum standards posed by Realism, Modernism, and innovations in literary criticism, In the address he complained of the "philistines" who were broadening the definition of literature to include "prospectuses for oil-burning furnaces and folders of omnibus lines. In February 1936 Hatfield made a lecture tour to Germany at the invitation of the Deutsche Akademie in Munich. His four lectures, "German culture in the United States", "The American educational system", "American life in town and country", and "Longfellow, a transmitter of German culture" were delivered at ten German universities and were later published by Northwestern University Press in both the original German and English translation. In his later years, he wrote articles for the Evanston Historical Society and an article on 19th-century sea shanties for the Journal of American Folklore. Hatfield died of a heart attack at the age of 83 while travelling from Chicago to his home in Evanston.
