= Justus Hermann Wetzel =

German composer, writer and music educator

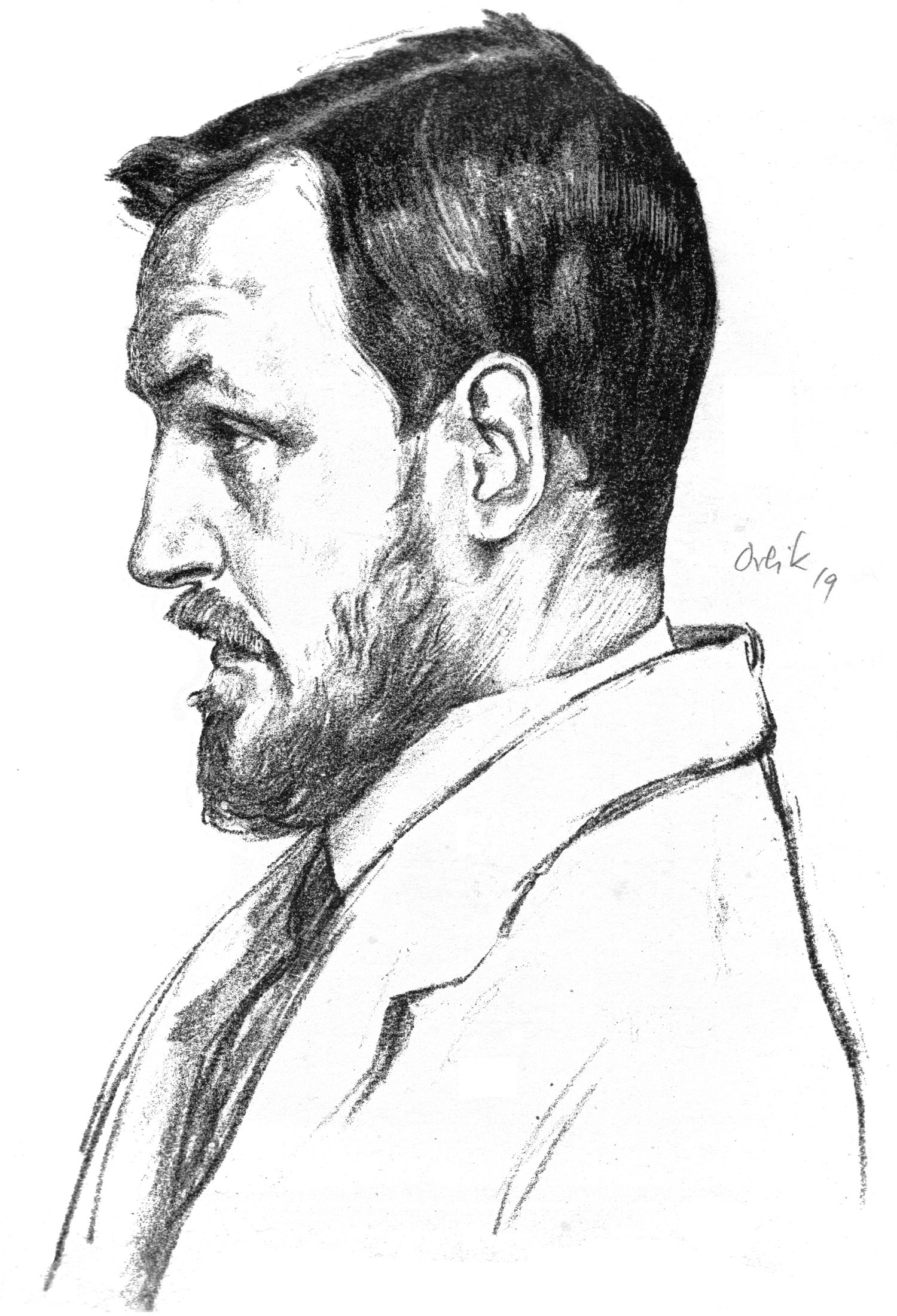
Justus Hermann Wetzel, lithograph by Emil Orlik, 1919

Justus Hermann Wetzel (11 March 1879 – 6 December 1973) was a German composer, writer and music educator.

== Life ==
Wetzel was born in Kyritz, Brandenburg, the son of a postal clerk. After his Abitur, which he passed in Potsdam in 1897, he studied biology in Berlin, Marburg and Munich from 1897 to 1901. In Marburg he also studied philosophy with Hermann Cohen and Paul Natorp. In 1901 he received his doctorate there with a zoological thesis. He then turned to music and deepened his knowledge with private studies in Berlin. The Friedrich-Kiel-Gesellschaft recorded him as a student of Friedrich Kiel. He made his living as a music consultant for various daily newspapers. From 1905 to 1907 he taught at the Riemann Conservatory in Stettin. In 1910 he finally moved to Berlin, where he first taught at the Klindworth-Scharwenka-Konservatorium and in 1926 he moved to the Royal Music Institute of Berlin in Berlin-Charlottenburg.

Although Wetzel lived a relatively secluded life and was hardly committed to his work, a large circle of friends and admirers surrounded him. These included not only musicians, but also visual artists such as Emil Orlik and his pupil Gunter Böhmer, the poet Hermann Hesse and Anna Spitteler, the daughter of the Swiss Nobel Prize winner for literature Carl Spitteler, whom Wetzel admired. Wetzel's pupils were the composers Mark Lothar and Friedrich Metzler and the pianist Gerhard Puchelt. On the occasion of Wetzel's 50th birthday, a concert was held on 16 March 1929 in the Sing-Akademie zu Berlin, which was dedicated exclusively to his work.

In 1937 Wetzel was dismissed from his teaching post because he refused to separate from his Jewish wife Rose née Bergmann. In March 1943 she was among those who were imprisoned in Rosenstrasse, but were released again by the famous Rosenstrasse protest. In 1945 Wetzel became a professor at the Berlin University of the Arts; in 1948, he moved with his family to Überlingen at Bodensee where he died at the age of 94.

== Family ==
The only child from Wetzel's marriage to Rose Bergmann is daughter Ruth (b. 14 December 1924 in Berlin). She moved to Paris after the war and was married to the Spanish composer Antonio Ruiz-Pipó. The marriage remained childless.

== Estate ==
Wetzel's estate was handed over to the archive of the Berlin University of the Arts by his daughter Ruth Ruiz-Pipó in 1999. In 2004 and 2005, it was used for Wetzel exhibitions in Berlin and Überlingen. Both exhibitions were curated by the art historian Nancy Tanneberger, who also dealt with the estate. The Hesse-Lieder found in the estate were published in 2006 by Klaus Martin Kopitz at Saier & Hug.

== Compositions ==
Wetzel devoted himself almost exclusively to the solo song with piano accompaniment. More than 600 songs have been handed down by him, of which about 100 have appeared in print. Stylistically they have their roots in the Romantic period and tie in with Johannes Brahms and Hugo Wolf. He also arranged the work of other composers, such as Pauline Volkstein. An important source of inspiration was the folk song. Numerous interpreters have worked for Wetzel, among the most renowned are Emmi Leisner, Heinrich Schlusnus, Paula Salomon-Lindberg, Dietrich Fischer-Dieskau, Peter Schöne as well as the pianist Sandra Droucker and the song accompanist Franz Rupp. Published in print:

- Elf Gedichte mit Musik für eine Singstimme und Klavier, Berlin, selfpublished, 1911
- Op. 1, Sechs Gedichte für eine hohe Stimme und Klavier, Köln, Tischer & Jagenberg, 1917 (Digitized)
- Op. 2, Acht Volkslieder mit neuen Weisen für eine mittlere Stimme und Klavier, Köln, Tischer & Jagenberg, 1917 (Digitized)
- Op. 3, Sechs Gedichte für eine hohe Stimme und Klavier, Cologne, Tischer & Jagenberg, 1919 (Digitized)
- Op. 4, Sechs Gedichte für eine hohe Stimme und Klavier, Cologne, Tischer & Jagenberg, 1919
- Op. 5, Sieben Gedichte für eine mittlere Stimme und Klavier, Cologne, Tischer & Jagenberg, 1919 (Digitized)
- Op. 8, Vier Gedichte für eine hohe Stimme und Klavier, Cologne, Tischer & Jagenberg, 1919 (Digitized)
- Op. 9, Drei Gedichte für eine mittlere Stimme und Klavier, Cologne, Tischer & Jagenberg, 1919 (Digitized)
- Op. 10, Vier Gedichte für eine tiefe Stimme und Klavier, Cologne, Tischer & Jagenberg, 1917 (Digitized)
- Op. 11, Fünfzehn Gedichte von Hermann Hesse, Berlin, RIes & Erler, 1925; 2nd edition 1960
  - Nr. 5, Frühlingstag, dedicated to Corry Nera
- Op. 12, Verwandlungen eines eigenen Themas für Klavier, Berlin, Ries & Erler, 1929, dedicated to Sandra Droucker
- Op. 13, 21 Gedichte von Joseph von Eichendorff, Berlin, Albert Stahl, 1931
  - Nr. 2, In Danzig, dedicated to Heinrich Schlusnus
  - Nr. 4, Morgenständchen, dedicated to Mark Lothar
  - Nr. 18, Der Kehraus, dedicated to Franz Rupp
- Im stillen Reich. Sieben Lieder für eine Singstimme und Klavier, edited by Werner Dürrson, Berlin, Ries & Erler, 1959 (Digitalisat)
- Lieder nach Gedichten von Hermann Hesse. 4 issues, edited by Klaus Martin Kopitz, Berlin, Saier & Hug, 2006

== Academic works ==
- Elementar-theorie der Musik, Einführung in die Theorie der Melodik, Harmonik, Rhythmik und der musikalischen Formen- und Vortragslehre.
- Die Verweigerung des Heerdienstes und die Verurteilung des Krieges und der Wehrpflicht in der Geschichte der Menschheit. Potsdam, Selbstverlag, 1905 – Nachdruck in Justus Hermann Wetzel, Briefe und Schriften, edited by Klaus Martin Kopitz und Nancy Tanneberger, Würzburg 2019, pp. 232–285
- Die Liedformen, Berlin, Vieweg, 1908
- Beethovens Violinsonaten, Berlin, Hesse, 1924
- Carl Spitteler. Ein Lebens- und Schaffensbericht. Bern, Francke, 1973, ISBN 3-7720-1058-X
- Justus Hermann Wetzel, Briefe und Schriften, edited by Klaus Martin Kopitz and Nancy Tanneberger, Würzburg 2019 (pp. 25–32 Correspondence with Paul Bekker, pp. 33–44 Correspondence with Werner Wolffheim, pp. 79–143 Correspondence with Hermann Hesse, pp. 151–173, Correspondence with Friedrich Metzler, pp. 189–198 Correspondence with Margarete Klinckerfuß, pp. 207–221, Correspondence with Mark Lothar, pp. 223–229 Correspondence with Hildegard Wegscheider).; ISBN 978-3-8260-7013-6

== Recordings ==
- Nachklang. Lieder von Justus Hermann Wetzel, interpreted by Olivia Vermeulen (mezzo-soprano), Peter Schöne (Bariton), Liana Vlad (piano) and Eduard Stan (piano); GENUIN & Deutschlandradio, 2012
