= Orphica =

Keyboard instrument

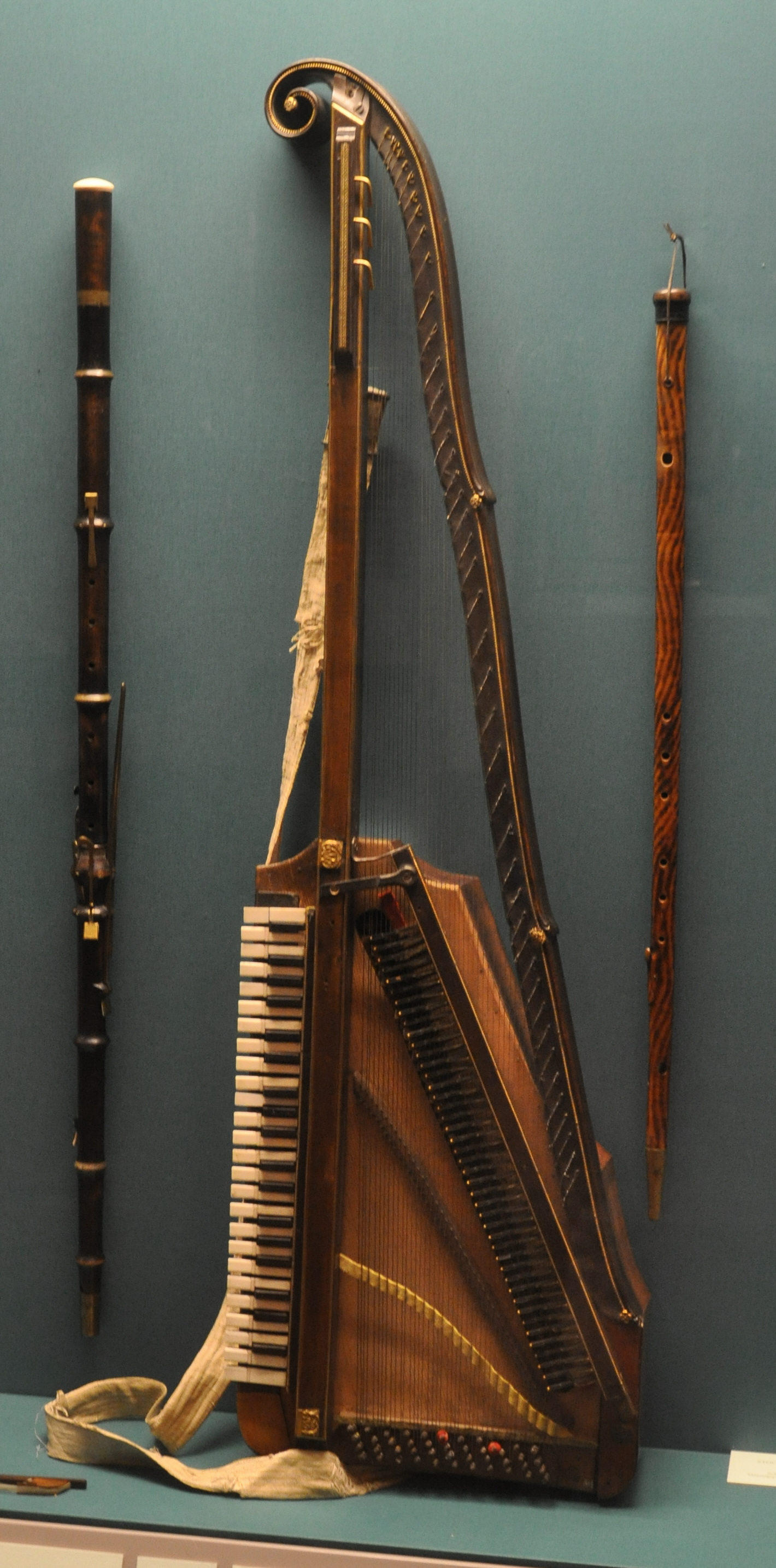
Orphica by Joseph Dohnal (Kunsthistorisches Museum)

The orphica is a portable piano invented by Carl Leopold Röllig in the late 18th century. Like a guitar, the orphica could be held on a shoulder strap, thus being an early forerunner of the modern keytar.

Only a few orphicas were made in Vienna from 1795 to 1810; about 30 orphicas are still in existence today.

Among the few composers writing for the orphica was Ludwig van Beethoven. According to a letter of Beethoven's friend Franz Gerhard Wegeler from December 23, 1827, Wegeler had 2 Stückchen für die Orphica, die Bhven für meine Frau componirte ('2 small pieces for the orphica which Beethoven composed for my wife'). This refers to the two pieces of 1798, WoO. 51, formerly erroneously titled Leichte Klaviersonate.

== Gallery ==
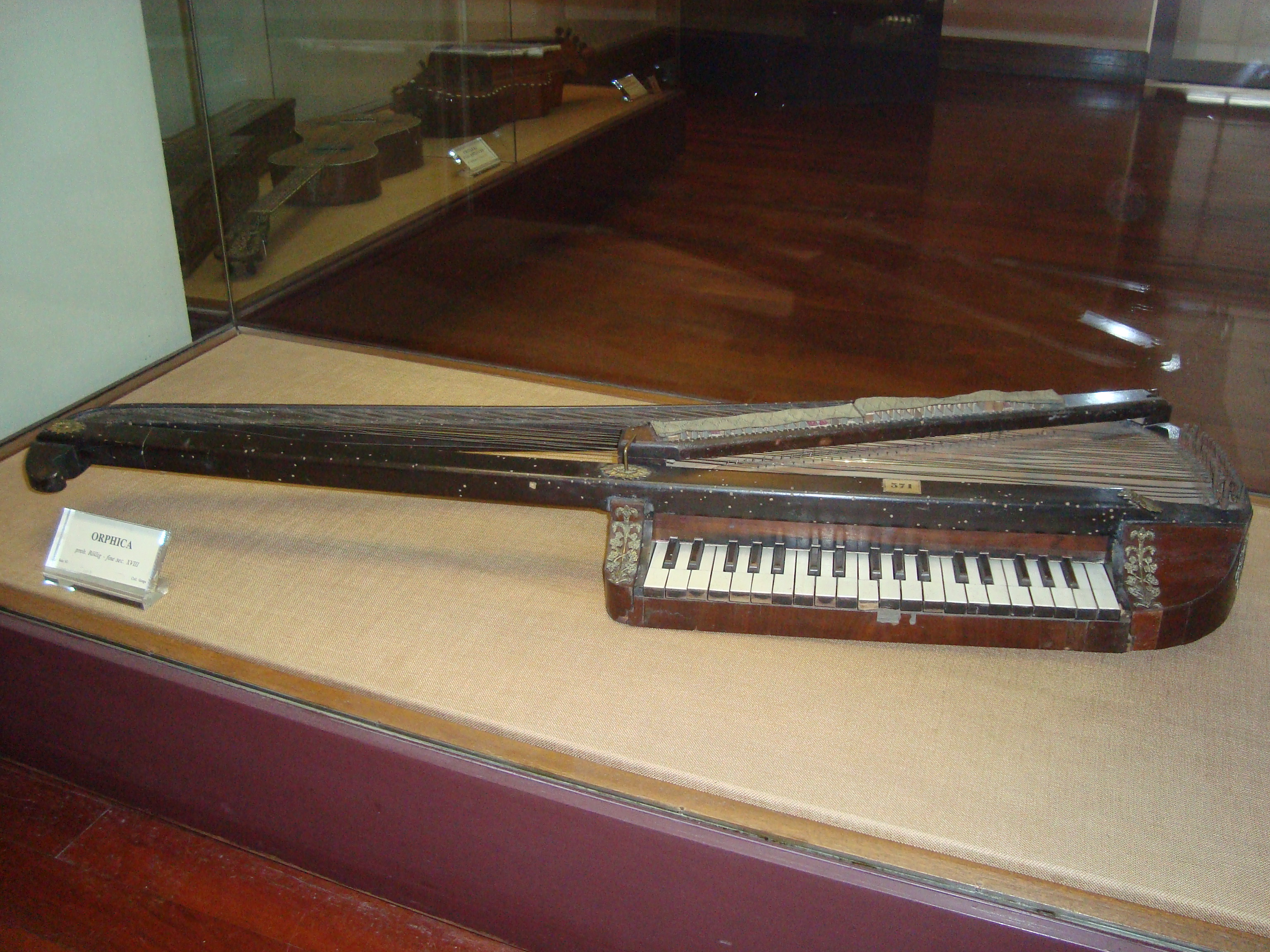
An orphica at the Museo Nazionale degli Strumenti Musicali di Roma

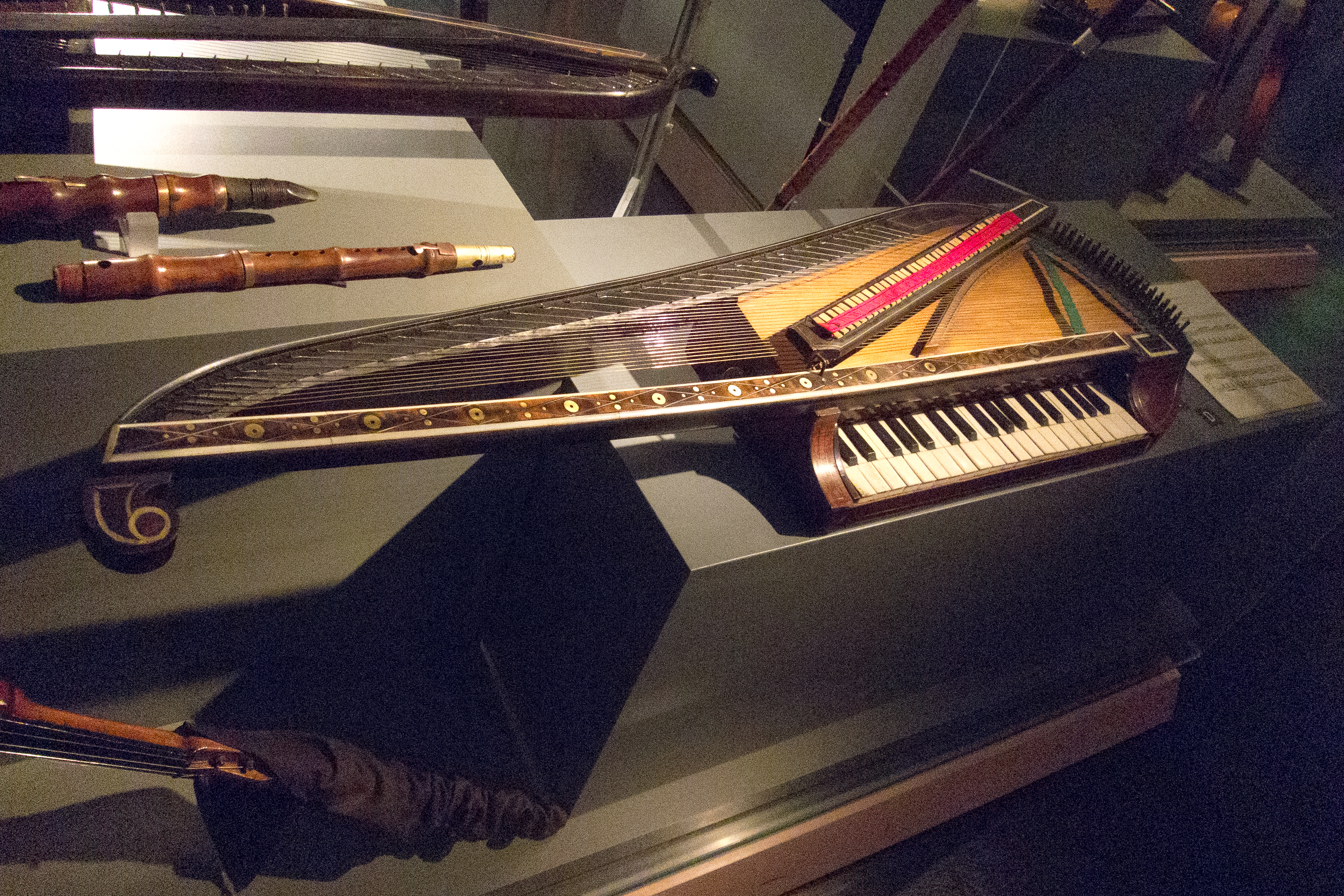
Orphica (Museum für Musikinstrumente der Universität Leipzig)

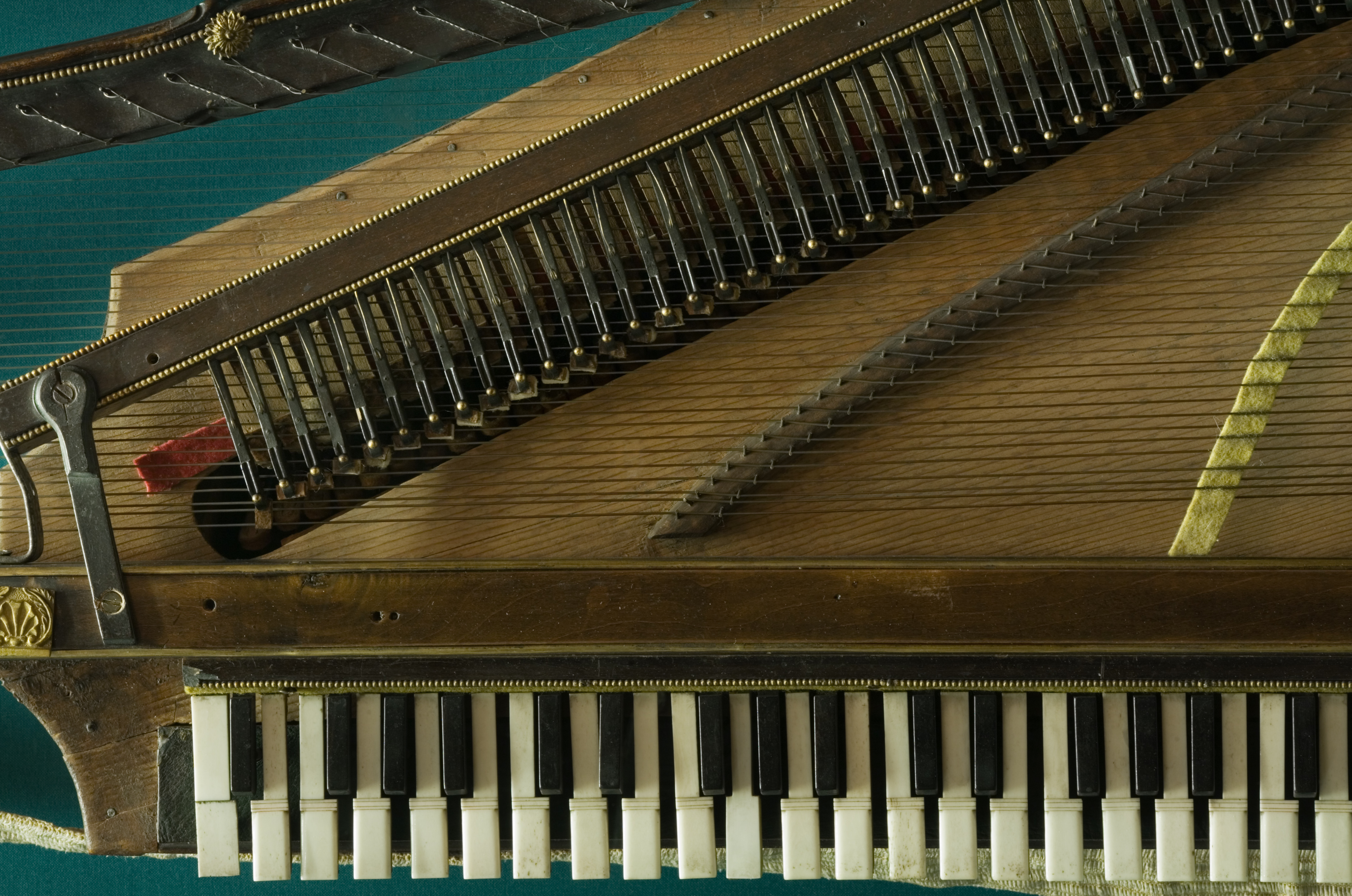
Details of Orphica (Kunsthistorisches Museum)
