= Die schöne Müllerin =

Song cycle by Franz Schubert

- Song cycle by Franz Schubert
- Opening page of the cycle
- Catalogue: D. 795
- Opus: 25
- Text: poems by Wilhelm Müller
- Language: German
- Composed: 1823
- Published: 1824
- Movements: 20
- Scoring: tenor; piano

Die schöne Müllerin (German pronunciation: [diː ˈʃøːnə ˈmʏlɐʁɪn],"The Fair Maid of the Mill", Op. 25, D. 795), is a song cycle by Franz Schubert from 1823 based on 20 poems by Wilhelm Müller. It is the first of Schubert's two seminal cycles (preceding Winterreise), and a pinnacle of Lied repertoire.

Die schöne Müllerin is performed by a pianist and a solo singer. The vocal part falls in the range of a tenor or soprano voice, but is often sung by other voices, transposed to a lower range, a precedent established by Schubert himself. Since the protagonist is a young man, performances by women's voices are less common. The piano part bears much of the expressive burden of the work, and is only seldom a mere 'accompaniment' to the singer. A typical performance lasts around sixty to seventy minutes.

== Composition ==
Müller published twenty-five poems in the first fascicule (1821) of Sieben und siebzig Gedichten aus den nachgelassenen Papieren eines reisenden Waldhornisten (Seventy-seven Poems from the Posthumous Papers of an Itinerant Hornist"). They arose from his unrequited passion for Luise Hensel, herself a poet as well as sister-in-law to Fanny Hensel and Felix Mendelssohn.

Schubert set twenty of them to music between May and September 1823, while he was also writing his opera Fierrabras. He was 26 years old at the time. Schubert omitted five of the poems, such as a prologue and an epilogue delivered by the poet. The work was published in 1824 by the firm of Sauer and Leidesdorf as Op. 25 under the title Die schöne Müllerin, ein Zyklus von Liedern, gedichtet von Wilhelm Müller (The Lovely Maid of the Mill, a song cycle to poems by Wilhelm Müller) and was dedicated to the singer Carl von Schönstein. The omitted poems were a "Prolog", "Das Mühlenleben" (following Nr. 6), "Erster Schmerz, letzter Scherz" (following Nr. 15), "Blümlein Vergißmein" (following Nr. 17) and "Epilog".

== Narrative ==
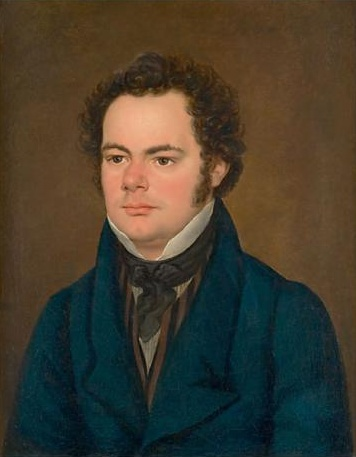
Portrait of Schubert by Franz Eybl (1827)

There are twenty songs in the cycle, around half in simple strophic form, and they move from cheerful optimism to despair and tragedy. At the beginning of the cycle, a young journeyman miller wanders happily through the countryside. He comes upon a brook, which he follows to a mill. He falls in love with the miller's beautiful daughter (the "Müllerin" of the title). She is out of his reach, as he is only a journeyman. He tries to impress her, but her response seems tentative. The young man is soon supplanted in her affections by a hunter clad in green, the colour of a ribbon he gave the girl. In his anguish, he experiences an obsession with the colour green, then an extravagant death fantasy in which flowers sprout from his grave to express his undying love. (See Beethoven's "Adelaide" for a similar fantasy.) In the end, the young man despairs and presumably drowns himself in the brook. The last number is a lullaby sung by the brook.

== Editions ==
The Diabelli edition of 1830 in a facsimile score, with notes by Walther Dürr, was published (1996) by Bärenreiter. The version in most common use is the Peters Edition, edited by Max Friedlaender, and in this and several other editions (e.g. Schirmer) the cycle is presented as the first 20 songs of Volume 1. There are versions in the original (high) keys, and transposed alternatives for lower voices. The Peters edition was revised by Dietrich Fischer-Dieskau and Elmar Budde, and is available as Volume 1 of the Peters Urtext Edition, available in high, medium and low key versions. The most recent scholarly edition is in the New Schubert Edition, again edited by Walther Dürr and published by Bärenreiter, and contains transposed versions for lower voices.

Six of the songs were transcribed for solo piano by Franz Liszt and published as Müllerlieder.

== Synopsis ==
1. "Das Wandern" ("Wandering"; B♭ major): "Wandering is the miller's joy" – a journeyman Miller happily travels through the countryside, singing of the restless water, millstones, and millwheels of his trade. This is a classic example of strophic song, in which the accompaniment is traditionally made to imitate the various objects about which the Miller sings. Schubert facilitates this with characteristically elegant and inventive piano writing; despite its simplicity, the music contains elements readily receptive to this imitative treatment, with the flowing cyclical broken triads evocative of both wheels and water, and the bass octaves pounding away. The composer continues this illustrative style throughout the cycle, with various recurring motifs. By far the most important of these, the Brook, is a character of its own represented by the piano, and appears next.
2. "Wohin?" ("Where to?"; G major): "Is this my path then? Oh tell me, brook, where to?" – the Miller fatefully comes across a Brook, and is captivated into following it. Through-composed, the piano imitates the babbling brook with a rippling pattern. This figuration, a first-inversion broken triad circling back on itself, goes on to represent the Brook almost exclusively throughout the cycle.
3. "Halt!" ("Stop!"; C major): "Dear little Brook, is this what you meant?" – the Brook leads the Miller to an idyllic mill in a forest grove. Through-composed, the piano imitates the vigorous turning of the mill wheel. Subtle diminished and minor harmonies in the accompaniment hint at foreboding.
4. "Danksagung an den Bach" ("Thanksgiving to the Brook"; G major): "Did she send you? Or have you enchanted me?" – The grateful Miller thanks the Brook for providing work for his hands and his heart – the latter in the form of the beautiful maid of the mill, the Müllerin of the title. Through-composed, with a contemplative broken chord pattern in the accompaniment, and a section in parallel minor as the Miller questions the nature of the Brook's guidance.
5. "Am Feierabend" ("Evening's Rest"; A minor): "If only I could move the millstones alone! Then the beautiful maiden would know my true purpose!" – the Miller is troubled when the Maiden wishes a good night to all the men, paying him no particular attention; he aches to distinguish himself from his peers. The piano channels the millworks in this through-composed song, with the up-and-down arpeggio from Halt! again representing the wheel and pounding bass evoking the stones. Highly contrasting static music in the central section captures the restful after-work setting of the otherwise incongruous title. This is an energetic high point of the first section, and the one entry in the cycle in which the protagonist actually sings the phrase "die schöne Müllerin".
6. "Der Neugierige" ("The Inquirer"; B major): "Tell me, little Brook – does she love me?" – he asks the enigmatic brook whether the Maiden loves him – Yes or No – between these two words lies his entire world. An expressive through-composed song opening with a cleverly executed musical question in the accompaniment – a rising pattern ending on a diminished chord. A slow, contemplative second section follows as the Miller interrogates the Brook, represented as always by its flowing broken triads.
7. "Ungeduld" ("Impatience"; A major): "My heart is yours, and it will be forever!" – he wishes he could carve his love into every tree, have every bird sing of it, have the wind tell of it. A strophic song in which a busy, restless repeated chord pattern in the accompaniment, crowded with ornaments, reflects the Miller's agitated state.
8. "Morgengruß" ("Morning Greeting"; C major): "Does my greeting displease you so?" – the Miller is troubled by the Maiden's cool reaction to his morning greeting. Nonetheless, his optimism is intact – he will just wait outside her window. A ballad in strophic form that progressively gathers expressive energy as the metric subdivision increases over each stanza, the Miller's infatuation swelling.
9. "Des Müllers Blumen" ("The Miller's Flowers"; A major): "The flowers will whisper to her as in a dream: forget me not!" – the Miller indulges in a poetic metaphor between the blue flowers beside the brook and the Maiden's blue eyes. The Miller's outpouring is matched with a lyrical arpeggio pattern and gently rocking 6/8 rhythm in this strophic song. An accepted performance convention places the third strophe, concerning dreams, an octave higher in the accompaniment. There is no explicitly indicated outro music, which is unusual in Schubert, but accompanists often choose to simply repeat the introduction. Regardless of this choice, the ending segues into the next song, in the same key.
10. "Tränenregen" ("Rain of Tears"; A major): "She said: 'Rain is coming – farewell, I'm going home'" – the Miller and Maiden share a tender moment by the Brook – the three principal characters in one place. The Miller cannot bring himself to look at her, and stares into the Brook at the moon and her reflection. As his tears ripple in the water, she abruptly leaves. Augmented harmonies and lyrical, flowing counterpoint in the accompaniment again imitate the brook and add to the nocturne atmosphere. The form is primarily strophic, with a shadowy coda in the parallel minor as the Maiden takes her leave.
11. "Mein!" ("Mine!"; D major): "Are these all the flowers you have, spring? Can you not shine brighter, sun? The beloved Millermaid is mine! Mine!" – the ecstatic Miller is convinced he possesses the Maiden, despite heretofore dubious encouragement. A brash, heavy-handed, low register accompaniment in broken chords captures the Miller's manic and effusive machismo, and the vocal line features athletic melisma in nearly every bar. In a near-comical fortissimo flourish, a deliberately muddy, fully-voiced D major chord closes the first half of the work.
12. "Pause" ("Interlude"; B♭ major): "Is it the echo of my love's pain? Or the prelude to new songs?" – the Miller, his heart too full to sing, hangs his lute on the wall with a green ribbon and reflects on the heavy burden of happiness. He muses anxiously whether the stirrings of his lute are ominous. Through-composed, a repetitive lute-like motif and static harmony in the accompaniment create the interlude atmosphere. Dissonant minor harmonies reflect the Miller's misgivings before they are shrugged off in the outro.
13. "Mit dem grünen Lautenbande" ("With the Green Lute-Ribbon"; B♭ major): "Wind the green ribbon into your locks, since you like green so much!" – the Maiden mentions she likes green, and the Miller is happy to oblige, giving her the ribbon as a symbol of their evergreen love. He tries to convince himself that he too likes green, though he is white with flour. Strophic, in short verses with flourishes idiomatic of the lute, the saccharine melody and accompaniment reflect the Miller's deluded optimism.
14. "Der Jäger" ("The Hunter"; C minor): "There is no game here for you to hunt! Only a doe, a tame one, for me!" – a rough and dashing Hunter clad in green arrives at the mill; the Miller is immediately disturbed by this romantic rival and spirals into a jealous diatribe. The vocal line is extremely dense and the delivery deliberately rushed in the manner of a patter song. In strophic form, the piano imitates hunting horns with a standard idiomatic chord pattern (see Der Lindenbaum from Winterreise, etc.) in a brash staccato 6/8 rhythm. The key changes rapidly between C minor and its relative major E♭ major. This song is a turning point, marking the beginning of the Miller's descent into tragedy.
15. "Eifersucht und Stolz" ("Jealousy and Pride"; G minor): "Where to so fast and wild, dear brook? Turn back, and scold your maiden!" – the Miller desperately compels the Brook to admonish the fickle Maiden, who has been flirting with the Hunter. Through-composed, the agitated broken-chord accompaniment imitates the now-raging Brook, with a central section again imitating hunting horns.
16. "Die liebe Farbe" ("The Beloved Colour"; B minor): "Dig me a grave in the green meadow, cover me with green turf, my sweetheart likes green so much" – the catatonic Miller obsesses miserably over green, the colour of his love and his pain. An ostinato F♯ in sixteenth notes, repeated over 500 times in the accompaniment across the strophic verses, reflects the Miller's tortured fixation and the monotony of the constant refrain. The sparse accompaniment follows the voice melody in lower harmony as it maintains the ostinato. Ironically, and most probably deliberately, the strophic verse structure and vocal line rhythm is identical to the cheerful Mit dem grünen Lautenbande; the lyrics for either song could be readily substituted over one another's accompaniment, despite their vast contrast in character and content.
17. "Die böse Farbe" ("The Hateful Colour"; B major): "Oh green, you hateful colour you! So proud, so mocking, so pleased with my pain!" – the Miller bitterly and defiantly renounces the colour green. He wishes only to take the Maiden's hand one last time to say farewell. In a through-composed rondo form, with an operatic scale of sound, the bold accompaniment again includes a hunting horn imitation in the second episode. In the parallel major of the preceding song, the two are an opposed pair.
18. "Trockne Blumen" ("Withered Flowers"; E minor): "And when she passes my grave, she will think 'He was true to me!'" – in an elaborate death fantasy, the Miller wishes to be buried with now-withered flowers the Maiden had given him. When she sees this, she will know his heart was faithful; the flowers will bloom again and thus his winter will have passed. Through-composed, the accompaniment at first represents the withered flowers with a minimalist series of simple chords – as the flowers bloom, the music becomes more lyrical, and the harmony and rhythm more intricate.
19. "Der Müller und der Bach" ("The Miller and the Brook"; G minor): "Oh dear little brook, you mean so well – but do you know what love does to you?" The hopeless Miller turns to the Brook in his heartbreak. The Brook answers with comforting and poetic words of love conquering pain. Resigned and exhausted, the Miller submits himself to the Brook's 'cool rest'. Through-composed, the gently rocking barcarolle-like accompaniment gives way to a broken chord pattern similar to that of Wohin, imitating the Brook and confirming a leitmotif of sorts as this character speaks for the first time. The notable use of Neapolitan chords in this song is one of many examples of chromatic substitution used liberally throughout the cycle, aptly illustrating in this case the languid resignation of the protagonist as the minor second sinks to the tonic. The outro sees the piano descend peacefully to a final major chord as the Miller meets his fate.
20. "Des Baches Wiegenlied" ("The Brook's Lullaby"; E major): – "Rest well, rest well, close your eyes. Wanderer, you weary one, you are at home." The Brook, who has always shown the Miller the constancy he so desired, sings him to sleep, admonishing the Maiden not to disturb him. A placid and relaxed strophic song, this idiomatic lullaby is by a considerable margin the longest entry in the cycle. The choice of E major, a tritone removed from the opening song, signifies the vast narrative distance covered by the cycle. "And heaven above, how vast it is!"
