= Günter Henle =

German politician, pianist, and music publisher (1899–1979)

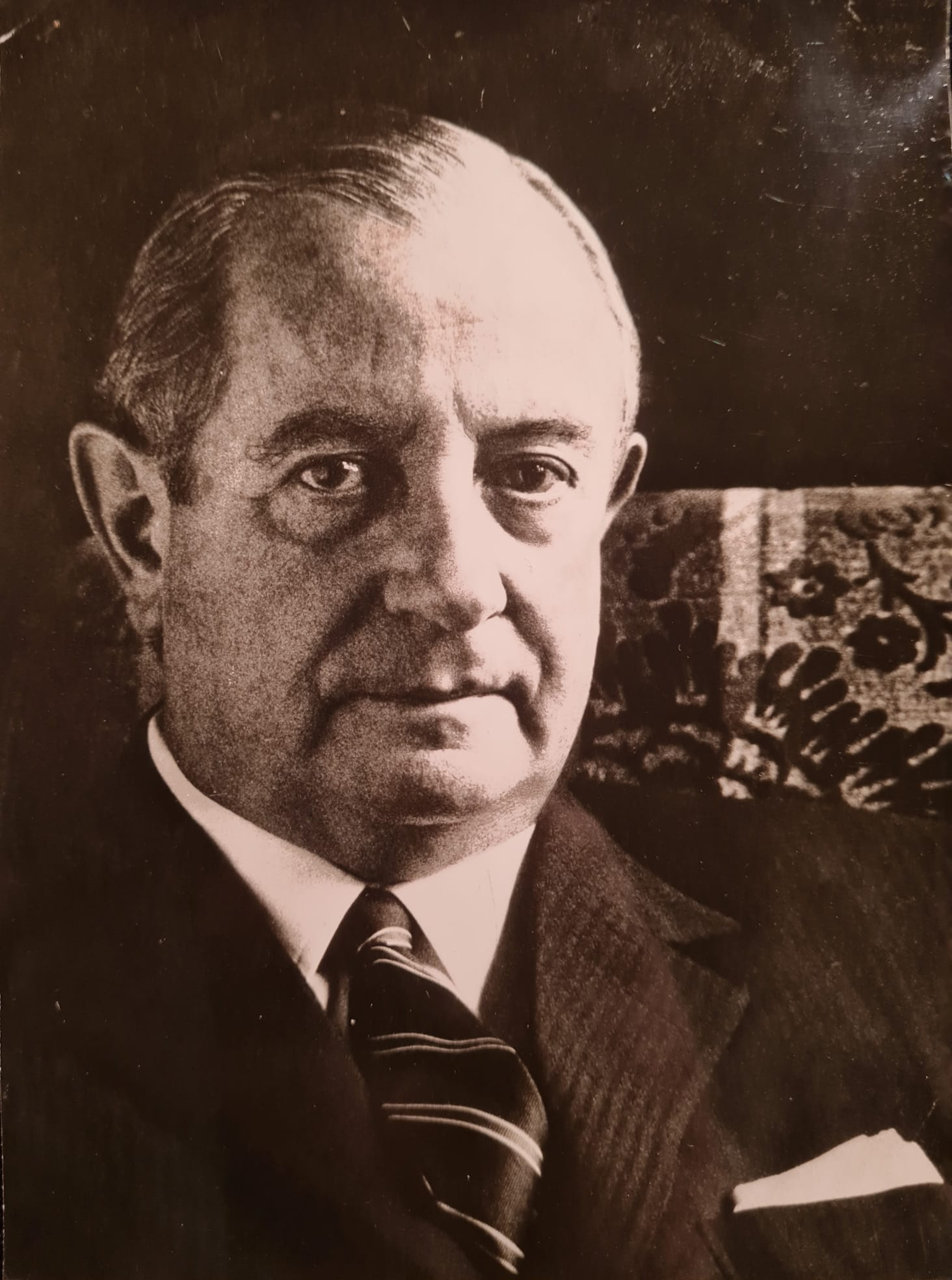
- Günter Henle

Member of the Common Assembly of the European Coal and Steel Community
- In office 16 July 1952 – 10 December 1953

Member of the Bundestag for Rhein-Wupper-Kreis
- In office 7 September 1949 – 7 September 1953

Personal details
- Born: 3 February 1899 Würzburg, German Empire
- Died: 13 April 1979 (aged 80) Duisburg, North Rhine-Westphalia, Germany
- Party: CDU

Günter Henle, also known as Günther Henle (3 February 1899 – 13 April 1979) was a German politician, pianist, and music publisher. He was a member of the Christian Democratic Union (CDU) and of the German Bundestag. He founded the music publisher G. Henle Verlag.

== Life ==
Henle also pursued a political career and was a member of the Frankfurt Economic Council from 1947 to 1949. He then belonged to the German Bundestag in its first legislative period (1949-1953) as a directly elected member of the Rhein-Wupper-Kreis constituency. From 1952 to 1953, he was also a member of the Common Assembly of the European Coal and Steel Community in Strasbourg, the predecessor of the European Parliament.

== Literature ==
- Herbst, Ludolf; Jahn, Bruno (2002). Vierhaus, Rudolf (ed.). Biographisches Handbuch der Mitglieder des Deutschen Bundestages. 1949–2002 [Biographical Handbook of the Members of the German Bundestag. 1949–2002] (in German). München: De Gruyter - De Gruyter Saur. p. 1715. ISBN 978-3-11-184511-1.
