= Henry Wood (scholar) =

American Professor of German Studies

Henry Wood (1849–1925) was an American Professor of German Studies at Johns Hopkins University.

== Early life and education ==
Wood was born in New Bedford, Massachusetts in 1849 to Henry Taber Wood and Anna Greene Russell, and schooled in Providence, Rhode Island.

He graduated from Haverford College in 1869, with an interest in German culture. Wood enrolled in Berlin University in 1875, where he studied classical philology. He then moved on to University of Leipzig where he studied modern languages. Amongst his tutors were some of the leading German literature historians of the time.

In 1879, he completed his Ph.D. with a dissertation on Geoffrey Chaucer's literary influence on James I of Scotland.

== Career ==
In 1881, Wood was appointed Associate (Instructor) in English at Johns Hopkins University (JHU). Since its founding, JHU aimed to draw influence from the German educational system, knowledge of which Wood was able to mention in his application.

In 1884, Wood moved to a role teaching German at JHU. Under Wood's direction, the teaching of the topic prospered: German was given its own department in 1888 with Wood becoming Professor in 1892. Wood would spend all of his academic career at JHU, retiring in 1920.

In academic terms, Wood appears to have focused his energies on growing the German Department at JHU over and above his own research. As such, he "saw the department that he had built as the proper combination of the German scholarly tradition adapted to a specifically American setting". In 1907, Hermann Collitz - "one of the leading philologists of the time" - joined the German department, further enhancing its scholarly reputation.

Amongst Wood's students was James Taft Hatfield, who would go on to become a leading philologist.

Outside of academia, amongst Wood's social circle was the writer H. L. Mencken.

== Personal life ==
Wood married Baroness Clothilde von Kretschman of Potsdam, Germany on June 16, 1902. They had three sons.

== Later years ==
World War I had a deep impact on Wood's life. It damaged the close German-American cultural links that Wood hoped his work inspired. On a personal level, on the day of the armistice in 1918, celebrating crowds burnt down Wood's summer house at Roaring Brook, Pennsylvania, which Wood believed was due to the locals having heard he and his friends speak German there.

Whilst Wood's letters from the time do not to suggest any bitterness, on retirement in 1919, Wood and Clothilde, moved to Potsdam, Germany, Clothilde's hometown where the two had married, and where Wood was eventually buried after his death in 1925.

== Recognition ==
Wood was a member of the American Folklore Society (AFS). At the ninth annual meeting of the AFS in 1897, Wood presented a paper titled 'Poe's Fall of the House of Usher: A Study in Comparative Literature and Folk-lore'. At the same meeting he was elected President of the Society. At the tenth annual meeting in 1898, Wood's Presidential Address was titled 'Folk-lore and Metaphor in Literary Style'.

He was also a member of the Baltimore branch of the AFS: he was present at its first meeting in 1895 where he was elected President of the branch.

Wood was made a Ritter dritter Klasse des königlich preußischen Ordens Roter Adler (Knight Third Class of the Royal Prussian Order of the Red Eagle) by Kaiser Wilhelm II in 1910. This was in recognition of Wood's contribution to German studies in the US, but it may also have reflected the connections between the von Kretschman family and the royal court.

== Selected publications ==
- Wood, Henry (1880). "Chaucer's Influence Upon King James I. Of Scotland as Poet". Anglia. 1880 (3). doi:10.1515/angl.1880.1880.3.223. hdl:2027/hvd.32044004617346. S2CID 162235131.
- Wood, Henry (1890). "Beginnings of the 'Classical' Heroic Couplet in England". The American Journal of Philology. 11 (1): 55–79. doi:10.2307/288088. hdl:2027/hvd.hnjcha. JSTOR 288088.
- Adams, H. B. (Herbert Baxter); Bump, C. Weathers; Adler, C.; Kayserling, M.; Wood, H. (1892). Columbus and his discovery of America. Baltimore: The Johns Hopkins Press.
- Wood, Henry (1912). Faust-studien: ein beitrag zum verständnis Goethes in seiner dichtung. Berlin: G. Reimer.
- Wood, Henry (1916). Literary adaptations in Gerhart Hauptmann's "Versunkene Glocke".
