= Henrietta Catharina, Baroness von Gersdorff =

German noblewoman (1648–1726)

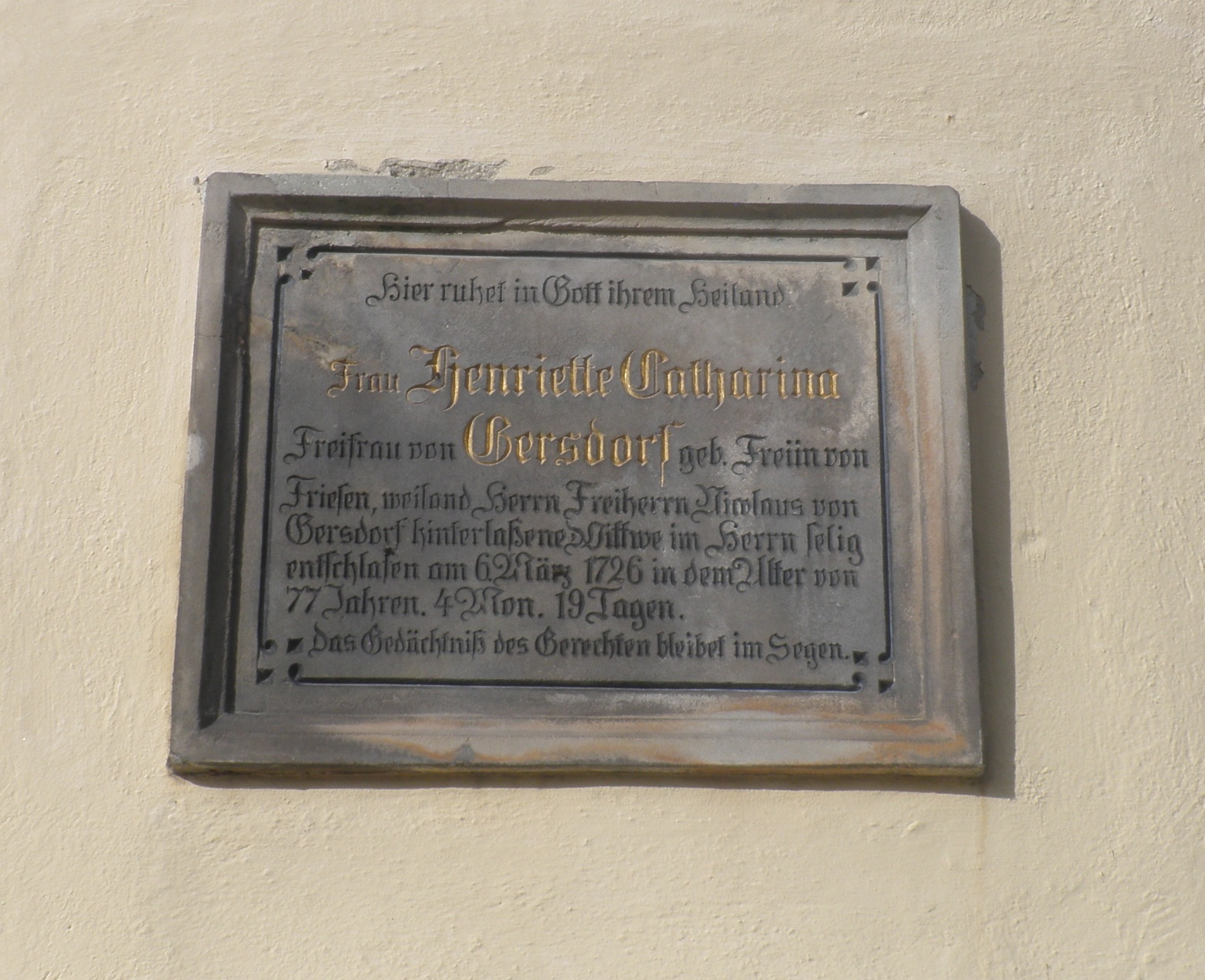
- Plaque on the wall of the Lutheran church in Großhennersdorf commemorating the place of eternal rest of Henriette von Gersdorff
- Born: Henrietta Catharina von Friesen auf Roetha; 6 October 1648; Sulzbach-Rosenberg, Upper Palatinate, Germany
- Died: 6 March 1726 (aged 77)
- Spouse(s): Nicolas, Baron von Gersdorff (m. 1672; death 1702)
- Relatives: Nicolaus Zinzendorf (grandson)

Henrietta Catharina, Baroness von Gersdorff (maiden name von Friesen auf Roetha; 6 October 1648 – 6 March 1726) was a German noblewoman, an author Baroque Christian poetry, an advocate of Pietism and also a supporter of the beginnings of the Moravian Church. She was the maternal grandmother of Count Nicolaus Ludwig von Zinzendorf.

== Biography ==
She was born in Sulzbach, Upper Palatinate, the daughter of Karl, Baron von Friesen, and Justina Sophia von Raben. She was educated in Dresden and Leipzig. She was a sister of Otto Heinrich von Friesen, chancellor to Saxon Elector Friedrich August I (August der Starke or Augustus the Strong). Unlike most girls of the time, she was trained in multiple disciplines, and even as a youth she was recognized by her contemporaries for her German and Latin poetry. She early became a correspondent with many theologians and scientists of the day.

At the age of 24, in 1672, she married Nicolas, Baron von Gersdorff (1629–1702), governor of the Saxon Upper Lusatia. In that capacity, she was able to exercise a not unimportant influence in affairs of both church and state. She supported the movement called Pietism and the Saxon Court preacher Philipp Jakob Spener.

She encouraged the translation of the Christian Bible into the Lusatian Slavic language of Sorbian but also encouraged the schooling of girls. In this connection she was engaged also in the founding of the Magdalenenstift School for girls in Altenburg.

Following her husband's death in 1702, she withdrew to her Grosshennersdorf estate in the mountains of eastern Saxony, where she died. There she devoted herself to the education of her grandson Nicolas Ludwig, Count von Zinzendorf. Her home was received many visitors, including Lutheran missionaries to the Danish overseas colonies of Tranquebar and Greenland. She often offered refuge to religious refugees escaping persecution in neighboring Bohemia and Moravia. The German Pietist poet Johann Jakob Rambach considered her Christian poetry among the best of their day. Some of her verses are still used in the German Moravian Church, and some were set to music by German composer Pauline Volkstein.

== Sources ==
- Karl Goedeke: 2. bzw. 3. ganz neu bearb. Aufl. 15 Bde., Dresden 1884–1966. Neudr. Nendeln 1975. (N. F. Fortführung von 1830–1880. vol. 1, Berlin/DDR 1962.), vol. 3, pp. 328.
- Linda Maria Koldau: Frauen - Musik - Kultur. Ein Handbuch zum deutschen Sprachgebiet der Frühen Neuzeit. Köln-Weimar-Wien 2005, ISBN 3-412-24505-4.
- Robert Langer: Pallas und ihre Waffen. Wirkungskreise der Henriette Catharina von Gersdorff. Dresden: Neisse Verlag, 2008; ISBN 978-3-940310-18-7
- Georg Christian Lehms: Teutschlands Galante Poetinnen. Frankfurt a. M. 1715.
- Norbert Weiss/ Jens Wonneberger: Dichter Denker Literaten aus sechs Jahrhunderten in Dresden. Dresden 1997.
- Carl Bertheau (1879). "Gersdorff, Henriette Catharina, Freifrau v." . Allgemeine Deutsche Biographie (in German). Vol. 9. Leipzig: Duncker & Humblot. pp. 53–55.
- Ernst-Heinz Lemper (1964). "Gersdorff, v.". Neue Deutsche Biographie (in German). Vol. 6. Berlin: Duncker & Humblot. pp. 318–319. (Familienartikel)
- Friedrich Wilhelm Bautz (1990). "Gersdorf, Henriette Katharina von". In Bautz, Friedrich Wilhelm (ed.). Biographisch-Bibliographisches Kirchenlexikon (BBKL) (in German). Vol. 2. Hamm: Bautz. cols. 228–229. ISBN 3-88309-032-8.
