= Rainer Cadenbach =

Rainer Cadenbach (1 July 1944 – 22 May 2008) was a German musicologist and University professor.

== Life ==
Born in Reichensachsen near Kassel, Cadenbach studierte German (with Benno von Wiese and Rudolf Schützeichel), philosophy (with Hans Wagner and Hariolf Oberer) as well as musicology (with Emil Platen and Günther Massenkeil at the Rheinische Friedrich-Wilhelms-Universität Bonn. In 1970 he passed his Staatsexamen and in 1977 he was awarded a doctorate with the work Das musikalische Kunstwerk. He then worked as a research assistant at the Department of Philosophy and later at the Department of Musicology of the Bonn University. In the 1970s and 80s he conducted the university orchestra Camerata musicale (today Uniorchester Bonn - Camerata musicale). In 1985 he won his habilitation with a thesis about Max Regers sketches and drafts and became Privatdozent. From 1987 to 1989 he was a substitute professor for musicology at the Hochschule der Künste in Berlin (since 2001 Universität der Künste Berlin), where he was appointed professor in 1989, succeeding Reinhold Brinkmann.

Cadenbach conceived and directed numerous interdisciplinary and cross-faculty artistic-scientific projects, symposia and congresses. Topics were the composer Dieter Schnebel (1990, 2000), Musicology in United Berlin (1991), Music and Visualization (1992), Walter Benjamin (1993), John Cage (1993), Friedrich Nietzsche (1994), Paul Hindemith (1995), Joseph Joachim (1995, 1997, 2007), surrealism and DADA (1998), Bohuslav Martinů (1999), Hermann Kretzschmar (1999), Beethoven (1996, 1999, 2001), Ernst Pepping (2001, 2006), Max Reger (2003, 2006), Richard Strauss (1999), Franz Schreker and his pupils (2003) and George Enescu (2005). From 1997 to 2005 he was one of the main members of the first graduate college at a German art academy on the subject of Practice and theory of the artistic creative process.

In 2002, Cadenbach established a Beethoven Research Center at the University of the Arts, which, financed by the Deutsche Forschungsgemeinschaft, developed the extensive edition Beethoven from the point of view of his contemporaries. Collaborators on the project, which was completed in 2008, were Klaus Martin Kopitz, Oliver Korte and Nancy Tanneberger.

Cadenbach died in Berlin at age 63.

== Publications ==
- Das musikalische Kunstwerk. Grundbegriffe einer undogmatischen Musiktheorie. Regensburg 1978. (Perspektiven zur Musikpädagogik und Musikwissenschaft. Volume 5.)
- Mythos Beethoven. Ausstellungskatalog. Laaber 1986.
- Max Reger – Skizzen und Entwürfe. Quellenverzeichnis und Inhaltsübersichten. Wiesbaden 1988. (Schriftenreihe des Max-Reger-Instituts Bonn. Volume 7.)
- Max Reger und seine Zeit. Laaber 1991 (Große Komponisten und ihre Zeit.)
