= Carl Friedrich Zöllner =

German composer (1800–1860)

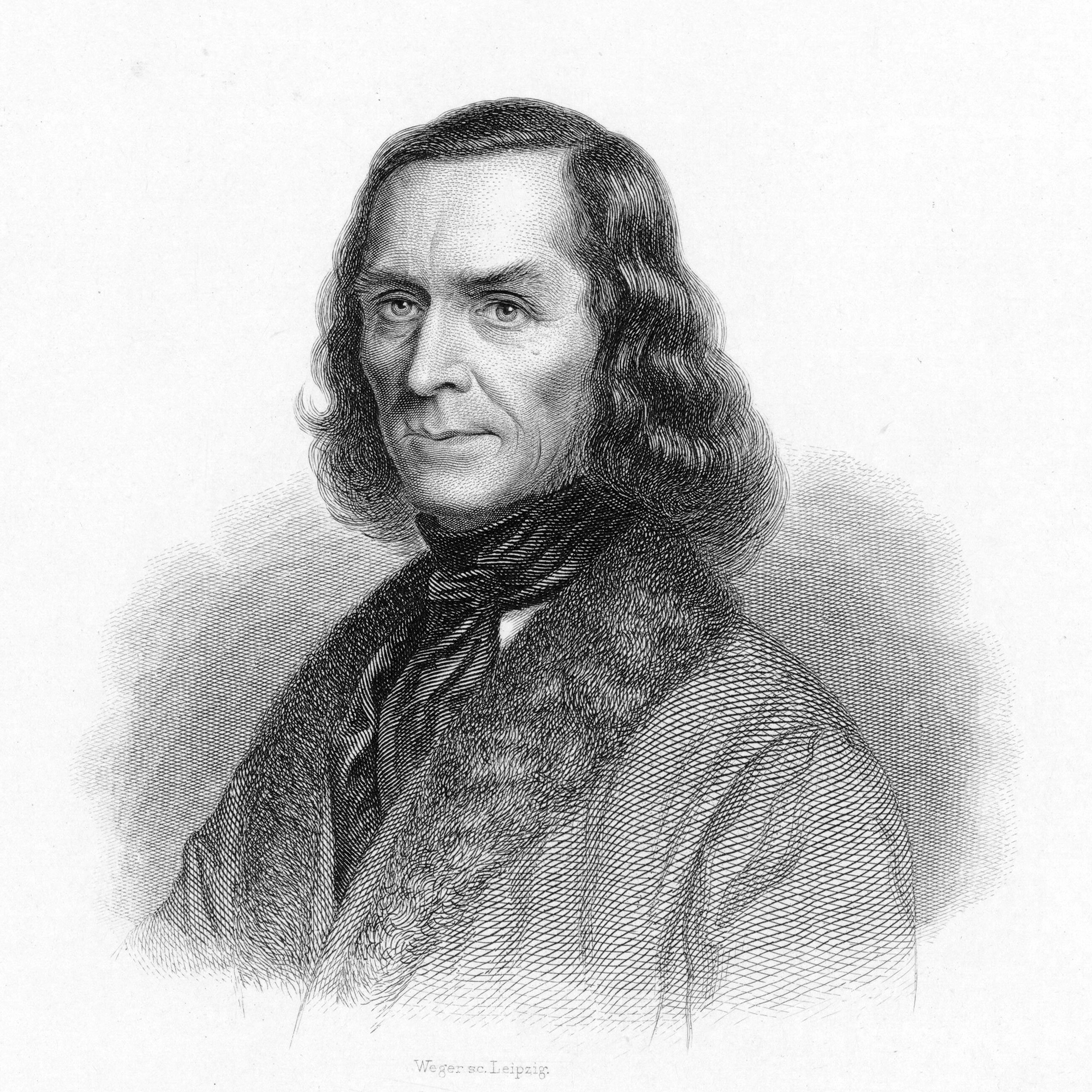
Carl Friedrich Zöllner.

Carl Friedrich Zöllner (17 May 1800 – 25 September 1860) was a German composer and choir director. After studying at the Thomasschule zu Leipzig under Johann Gottfried Schicht, he started teaching voice. He wrote organ variations on God Save the Queen and wrote several songs. His son was composer Heinrich Zöllner.

In Leipzig, Carl Friedrich Zöllner is honoured by the Carl-Friedrich-Zöllner-Denkmal (Memorial) in the Rosental park.
