= Klaus Martin Kopitz =

German musicologist

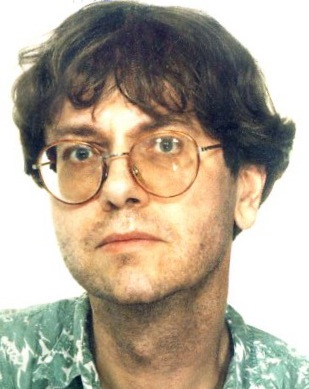
Klaus Martin Kopitz (1995)

Klaus Martin Kopitz (born January 29, 1955, Stendal) is a German composer and musicologist. He became known in particular with his album Mia Brentano's Hidden Sea. 20 songs for 2 pianos. In the US, it was 2018 on the annual "Want List" of the music magazine Fanfare.

== Life ==
Kopitz studied at the Hochschule für Musik "Hanns Eisler" (1975–1980) and at the Academy of Arts, Berlin (1985–1987), where he was a pupil of Georg Katzer. Later he worked at the theatre in Neustrelitz, at the Berlin University of the Arts (since 2002), and at the Saxon Academy of Sciences in Leipzig (from 2012 to 2024), where he directed the complete edition of the correspondence by Robert and Clara Schumann.

== Music ==
His compositions are inspired from Classical music, Jazz, Pop and Minimal music, but can not be assigned to any specific style. In particular, his CD Mia Brentano's Hidden Sea was highly praised by the critics. For Dave Saemann it is "the most titillating CD I've come across in a long time". Huntley Dent calls it "unique among current and past releases". Oliver Buslau stated: "An ever-surprising panorama from classical to free tonal, from jazzy to minimalist".

== Awards ==
- 1991: Hanns Eisler Prize
- 2019: German Record Critics' Award (Crossover Productions)

== Selected discography ==
- 2018: Mia Brentano’s Hidden Sea: 20 Songs for 2 Pianos; with Benyamin Nuss & Max Nyberg (piano) – Mons Records
  - When it Rained, Christina's World, Early Birds, Miss Ada, Misty Morning, Along the River, Slapstick, A Silent Place, Children, My Huckleberry Friend, A Storm is Coming, Canajoharie, Wherever You Are, On the Train to Maine, Footprints, Mama Mia’s Moonshine Bar, Remembering Stella, Summernight Tales, Wake up, 4 o’clock a.m.
- 2019: Mia Brentano’s River of Memories: A Mystery Trip; with Benyamin Nuss (piano), Andy Miles (clarinet), Johannes Ernst (saxophone), Hans Dekker (drums), Klaus Martin Kopitz (electronics) et al. – Mons Records
  - Blue Moon, Under the Surface, Les Champs magnétiques, Floating, Der Besucher, Wide Open Landscape, Silver Rain, Die Stille des verlassenen Raumes, Over the City of Glass, Angry Mia, Septemberland, Lily of the Valley, Ghosts (for Paul Auster), Dancing in Twilight, Brahms Is Sleeping
- 2021: Mia Brentano’s Summerhouse: New Music for 2 Pianos; with Benyamin Nuss & Billy Test (piano); produced by WDR Köln – Mons Records
  - The Letter, Roads into Dusk, Cat in the Window, Before Sunrise, I Was Seventeen, Unsung Song, Desert Island, Birds Leaving the Earth, Strange Little Boy, Dreaming Mathilda, Sleepy Landscape, Funky Fox, Angel in the Rain, Nightlounge, She Needs the Wind, Alone at the Lakeside, It’s Dripping on My Roof, Red Shoes, Drifting, Walking in Starlight
- 2023 – Mia Brentano’s American Diary; Benyamin Nuss (piano), Deutsches Filmorchester Babelsberg, Christian Köhler (conducting) – Mons Records
  - A Cabin in the Rockies, Good Morning, Good Fairy, Both of Us, Mad Dog in the Fog, Our God Is the Moon Over Alaska, Wie ein Vogel zu fliegen (Wolfgang Richter, arr. by Mia Brentano), The Secret Garden, Midnight in Paradise, Wild Neighbors, Laurel Canyon, I Thought About You (Jimmy Van Heusen, arr. by Mia Brentano), Not All Who Wander Are Lost, Talking with Trees, Me and the Wizard, A Bridge Across the Ocean, Flying Lights, Flying Colors, Eisler in Hollywood, Last Evening in Carmel, For Whom the Bell Tolls, No Time to Stop, Sandpiper’s Grave, Let It Rain, Burning Bodega (A Nightmare), Sandman’s Lullaby (Wolfgang Richter, arr. by Benyamin Nuss)

== Selected bibliography ==
- Der Düsseldorfer Komponist Norbert Burgmüller. Ein Leben zwischen Beethoven – Spohr – Mendelssohn, Köln: Dohr 1998, ISBN 978-3-936655-34-6
- Antonie Brentano in Wien (1809–1812). Neue Quellen zur Problematik „Unsterbliche Geliebte“, in: Bonner Beethoven-Studien, vol. 2 (2001), pp. 115–146, klaus-martin-kopitz.de (PDF)
- Beethoven as a Composer for the Orphica: A New Source for WoO 51, in: The Beethoven Journal, vol. 22, no. 1 (Summer 2007), pp. 25–30, klaus-martin-kopitz.de (PDF)
- Beethoven aus der Sicht seiner Zeitgenossen, ed. by Klaus Martin Kopitz and Rainer Cadenbach, 2 vols., Munich: Henle 2009, ISBN 978-3-87328-120-2
- Beethoven, Elisabeth Röckel und das Albumblatt „Für Elise“, Cologne: Dohr 2010, ISBN 978-3-936655-87-2
- Beethovens „Elise“ Elisabeth Röckel. Neue Aspekte zur Entstehung und Überlieferung des Klavierstücks WoO 59, in: Die Tonkunst, vol. 9, No. 1 (January 2015), pp. 48–57, klaus-martin-kopitz.de (PDF)
- Briefwechsel Robert und Clara Schumanns mit Joseph Joachim und seiner Familie, 2 vols. (= Schumann-Briefedition, series II, vol. 2), Köln: Dohr 2019, ISBN 978-3-86846-013-1
- Justus Hermann Wetzel, Briefe und Schriften, edited by Klaus Martin Kopitz and Nancy Tanneberger, Würzburg 2019 (pp. 25–32 Correspondence with Paul Bekker, pp. 33–44 Correspondence with Werner Wolffheim, pp. 79–143 Correspondence with Hermann Hesse, pp. 151–173, Correspondence with Friedrich Metzler, pp. 189–198 Correspondence with Margarete Klinckerfuß, pp. 207–221, Correspondence with Mark Lothar, pp. 223–229 Correspondence with Hildegard Wegscheider).; ISBN 978-3-8260-7013-6
- Beethoven’s ‘Elise’ Elisabeth Röckel: a forgotten love story and a famous piano piece, in: The Musical Times, vol. 161, no. 1953 (Winter 2020), pp. 9–26, klaus-martin-kopitz.de (PDF)
- Jacqueline Kharouf, Beautiful Things Repeat Themselves: An Interview with Klaus Martin Kopitz, in: Fanfare, vol. 46, no. 3 (May/June 2022), p. 94–101 (PDF)
