= Piano Trio, WoO 38 (Beethoven) =

Piano Trio by Ludwig van Beethoven

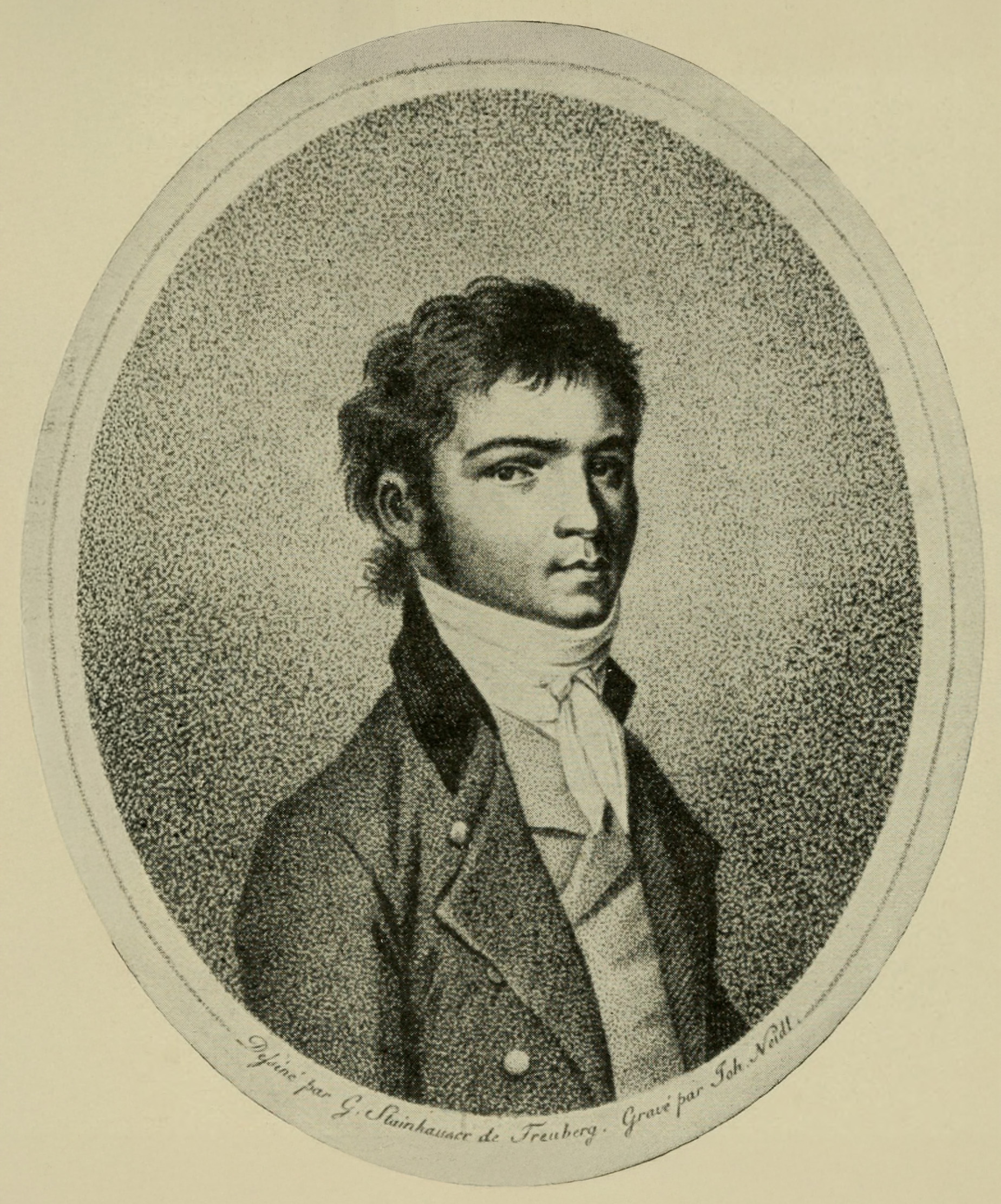
Ludwig van Beethoven, c. 1796

The Piano Trio, WoO 38, in E♭ major is a composition for piano trio by Ludwig van Beethoven, that was discovered amongst Beethoven's papers following his death. It is believed to have been composed in either 1790 or 1791. More conventional in nature than the Piano Trios Op.1, the composition was not published until 1830 by F. P. Dunst in Frankfurt, along with the Allegretto for Piano Trio in B♭ major, WoO 39, and Piano Sonata in C major, WoO 51.

== Background ==
Beethoven is believed to have worked on this trio shortly before he left Bonn for Vienna in 1792. The precise circumstances of composition are not known and the work remained unpublished until after the composer died in 1827. When F. P. Dunst published the work in 1830, the publication included a statement to the effect that the work was Beethoven's, signed by Carl Czerny, Anton Diabelli and Ferdinand Ries. At that time the manuscript was stated to be held by Anton Schindler, but, according to Cooper it is now lost.

== Music ==
The composition is in three movements, all in the key of E♭ major:

1. Allegro moderato
2. Scherzo: Allegro ma non troppo (Note: This is the first composition by Beethoven known to use the tempo marking Scherzo.)
3. Rondo: Allegretto

A typical performance takes around 13 to 15 minutes.

== Notes and references ==
Notes

Sources

- Anderson, Keith (2013). Beethoven: Piano Trios, Vol. 5 – Piano Trios No. 7, "Archduke" and WoO 38/Variations on Ich bin der Schneider Kakadu (CD). Naxos Records. 8.572343.
- Cooper, Barry (2000). Beethoven. United States: Oxford University Press. ISBN 0191592706.
- Hiebert, Elfrieda Franz (1970). The Piano Trios of Beethoven: An Historical and Analytical Study. University Microfilms.
- Watson, Angus (2012). Beethoven's Chamber Music in Context. Woodbridge: Boydell Press. ISBN 978-1-84383-716-9.
- Wigmore, Richard (2011). Beethoven: The Complete Music for Piano Trio (PDF) (CD). Hyperion Records. CDS44471/4.
