= Piano Sonata, WoO 51 (Beethoven) =

Beethoven piano sonata

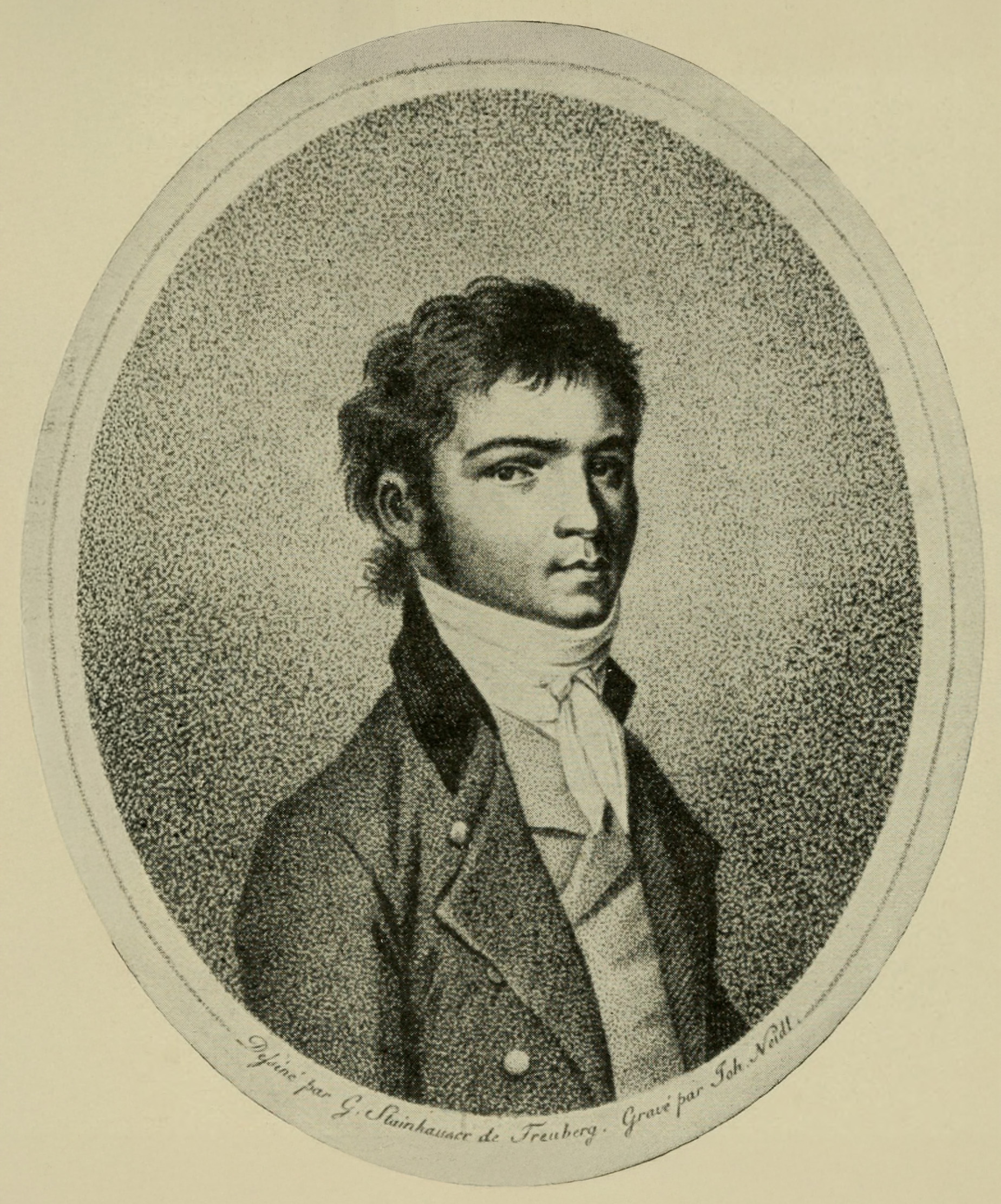
Portrait of Beethoven, aged 29

The Piano Sonata, WoO 51, in C major (also called the Sonatina in C major), is an incomplete composition for piano by Ludwig van Beethoven, believed to have been composed before he left Bonn, that was discovered amongst Beethoven's papers following his death. The composition was not published until 1830 by F. P. Dunst in Frankfurt, with a dedication to Eleonore von Breuning, along with the piano trios WoO 38 and WoO 39.

== Background ==
Beethoven is believed to have begun composing the sonata some time around 1790–91 for Eleonore von Breuning on the basis of a letter to her from 1796 in which he announced that a sonata that he had promised to her some time previously would be sent to her. A recent evaluation opines that the sonata shares stylistic characteristics with the Piano Sonatas, WoO 47, Nos. 1–3.

While Alexander Thayer believed that the sonata was a complete three movement work by 1796, at the time of Beethoven's death the manuscript copy only contained the complete first movement and an incomplete second movement. For publication in 1830 Ferdinand Ries composed an additional eleven measures of music to complete the second movement.

== Movements ==
The composition as published is in two movements:

1. Allegro
2. Adagio

A typical performance takes around 6 to 7 minutes.
