= Wilhelm Müller =

German poet (1794–1827)

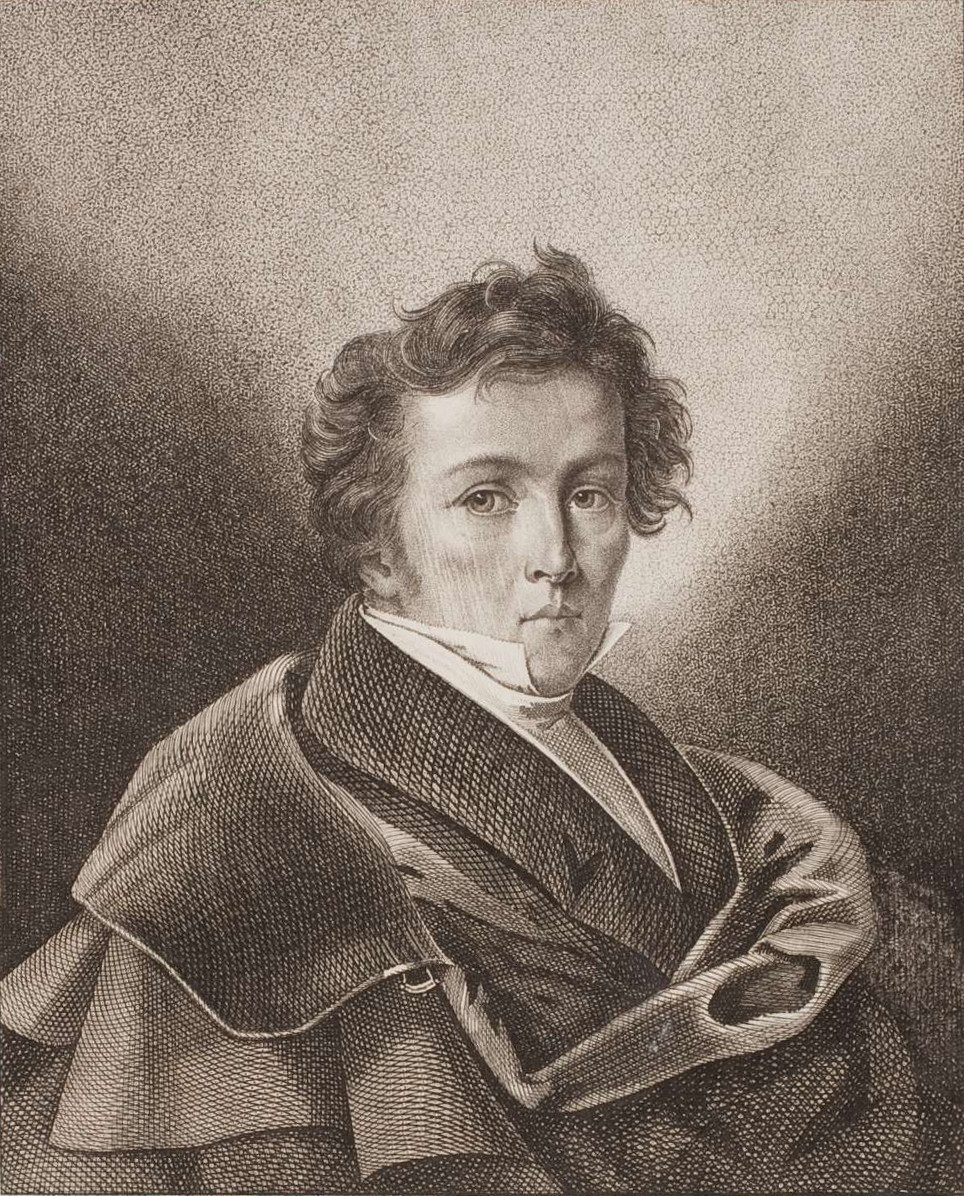
- Born: 7 October 1794; Dessau, Anhalt-Dessau
- Died: 30 September 1827 (aged 32); Dessau, Anhalt-Dessau
- Writing career
- Notable works: Die Schöne Müllerin, Winterreise

Johann Ludwig Wilhelm Müller (7 October 1794 – 30 September 1827) was a German lyric poet, best known as the author of Die schöne Müllerin (1821) and Winterreise (1823). These would later be the source of inspiration for two song cycles composed by Franz Schubert.

== Life ==
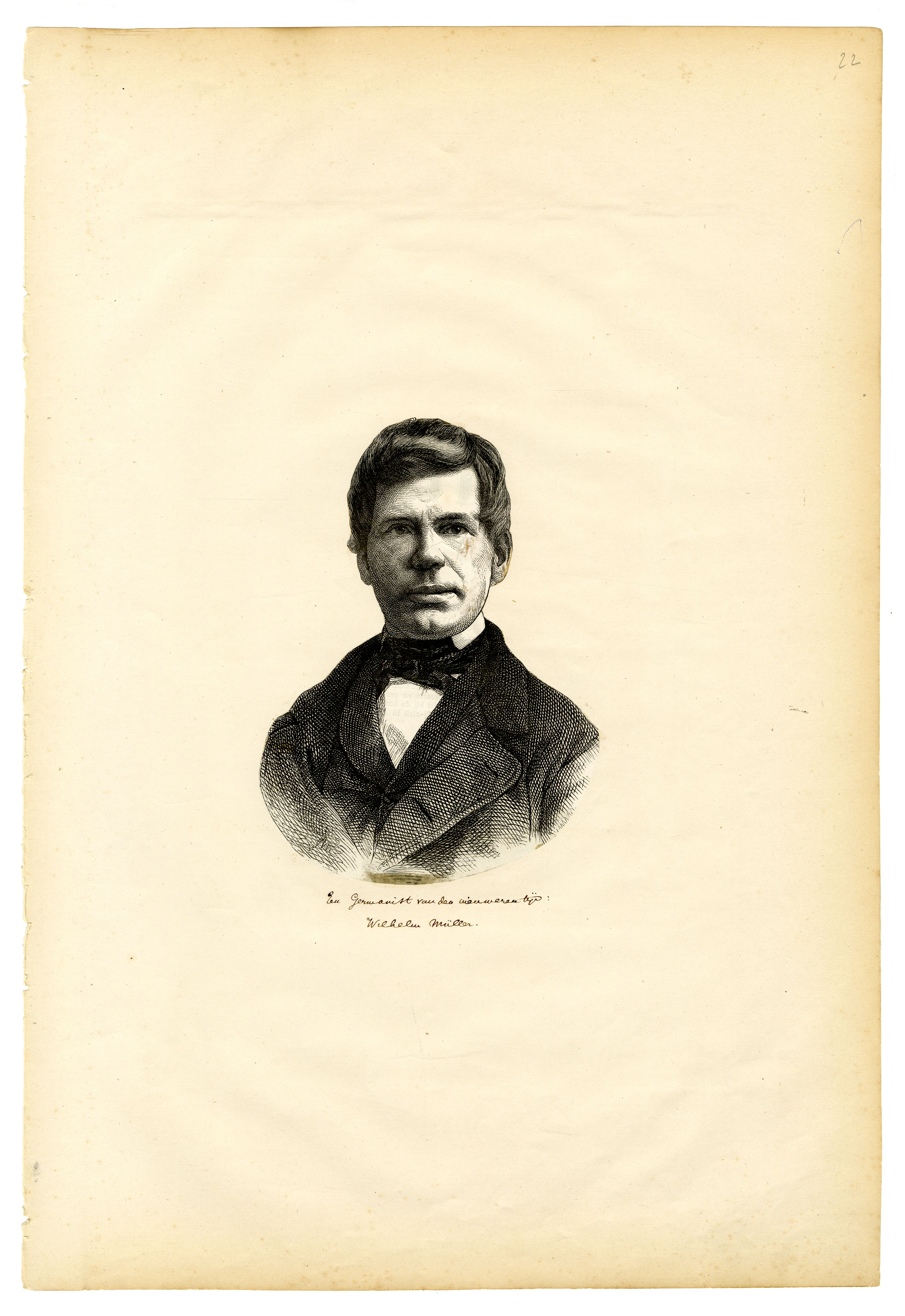
Wilhelm Müller (1794–1827), Felixarchief

Wilhelm Müller was born on 7 October 1794 in Dessau, as the son of a tailor. In Dessau, he pursued a distinguished academic career. He received his education at a local gymnasium, and would later attend the University of Berlin, where he specialised in philological and historical studies. In 1813-1814 he took part in the national uprising against Napoleon as a volunteer in the Prussian army. He participated in the battles of Lützen, Bautzen, Hanau and Kulm. In 1814 he returned to his studies at Berlin. From 1817 to 1819, he visited southern Germany and Italy, and in 1820 published his impressions of the latter in Rom, Römer und Römerinnen. In 1819, he was appointed teacher of classics in the Gelehrtenschule at Dessau, and in 1820 librarian to the ducal library. He remained there the rest of his life, dying of a heart attack aged only 32. Müller's son, Friedrich Max Müller, was a German-born British orientalist who founded the comparative study of religions; his grandson Sir William Grenfell Max Muller was a British diplomat.

== Works ==
Müller's earliest lyrics are in a volume of poems, Bundesblüten, by several friends, published in 1816. That same year he also published Blumenlese aus den Minnesängern (Flowers harvested from the Minnesingers). His literary reputation was made by the Gedichte aus den hinterlassenen Papieren eines reisenden Waldhornisten (in two volumes, 1821–1824), and the Lieder der Griechen (1821–1824). The last-named collection was Germany's chief tribute of sympathy to the Greeks in their struggle against the Turkish yoke, a theme that inspired many poets of the time. Two volumes of Neugriechische Volkslieder, and Lyrische Reisen und epigrammatische Spaziergänge, followed in 1825 and 1827. Many of his poems imitate the German Volkslied.

Müller also wrote a book on the Homerische Vorschule (1824; 2nd. ed., 1836), translated Marlowe's Faustus, and edited a Bibliothek der Dichtungen des 17. Jahrhunderts (1825–1827; in ten volumes), a collection of lyric poems.

=== Editions ===
Müller's Vermischte Schriften (Miscellaneous writings) was edited with a biography by Gustav Schwab (three volumes, 1830). Wilhelm Müller's Gedichte were collected in 1837 (4th ed., 1858), and also edited by his son, Friedrich Max Müller (1868). There are also numerous more recent editions, notably one in Reclam's Universalbibliothek (1894), and a critical edition by J. T. Hatfield (1906).

== Historical position vis-à-vis Romanticism ==
Recent research has stressed that Müller, although contemporaneous with German Romanticism, cannot easily be subsumed under that movement. In ‘Die Winterreise’ – which occupies a central position in Müller's lyric output – the wanderer shows a determination not to get lost on the Romantic paths that promise a way out of present dissatisfactions. “Andreas Dorschel has convincingly argued that ‘Die Winterreise’ is a work of Enlightenment.” The cycle depicts the self-determination of a subject who retains the ability to reflect because he is not engulfed by dreams. The realms of dream, death, and nature do not fulfil their promise, and the traveller ultimately rejects “Schein” (semblance) for “Sein” (actual being), or the imagined future for the real present. “As Dorschel points out, the wanderer actively denies the value of dreaming in ‘Im Dorfe’ (‘Was will ich unter den Schläfern säumen?’ [‘Why should I want to waste my time among those who are asleep?’] [...]), and [...] death eludes him. This is not merely chance, however, for when ‘Der Lindenbaum’ calls him temptingly back with the promise of eternal rest, he actively chooses to keep walking away from its lure. Dorschel aligns the wanderer with Kant's enlightened subject who sets off on an ‘Ausgang [. . .] aus seiner selbstverschuldeten Unmündigkeit’ (‘emergence [...] from his self-imposed immaturity’), avoiding ‘die Wege, / Wo die andren Wandrer gehn’ [‘paths / where other wanderers walk’] (‘Der Wegweiser’ [...]) as he charts his own path.”

== Legacy ==
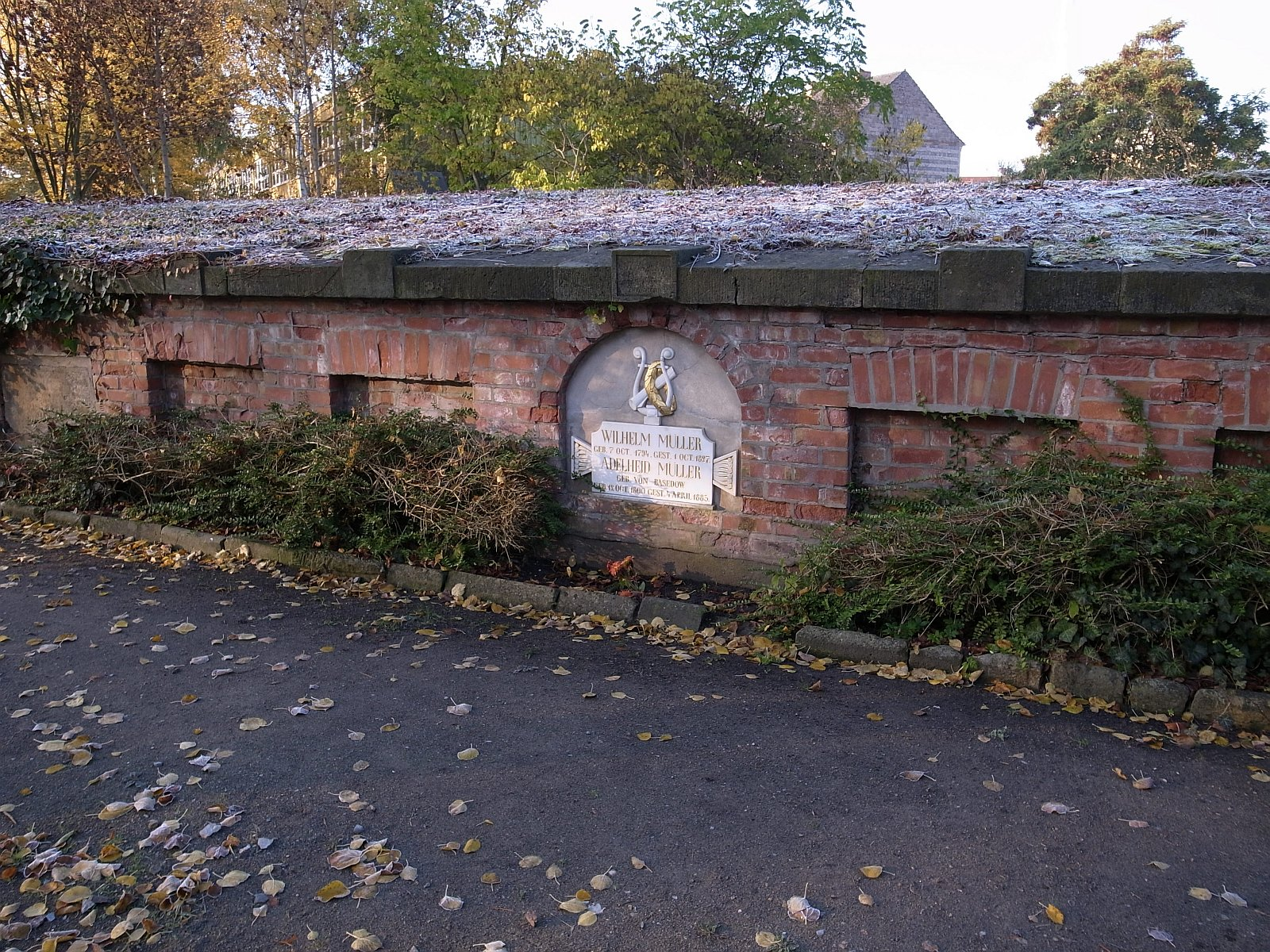
Müller's grave in Dessau

Müller excelled in popular and political songs that attracted great composers, notably two of Franz Schubert's song cycles, Die schöne Müllerin and Winterreise, which are based on the sets of poems of the same name by Müller. He also influenced Heinrich Heine's lyric development.

Composer Pauline Volkstein (1849–1925) set Müller's text to music in her lieder.

Andrés Neuman wrote a novel, El viajero del siglo (Traveller of the Century, 2009), inspired by the poems of Winter Journey (Wanderlieder von Wilhelm Müller. Die Winterreise. In 12 Liedern), giving life to several of its characters. Neuman had previously translated Müller's Winter Journey poems to the Spanish language.
