= Allegretto for Piano Trio, WoO 39 (Beethoven) =

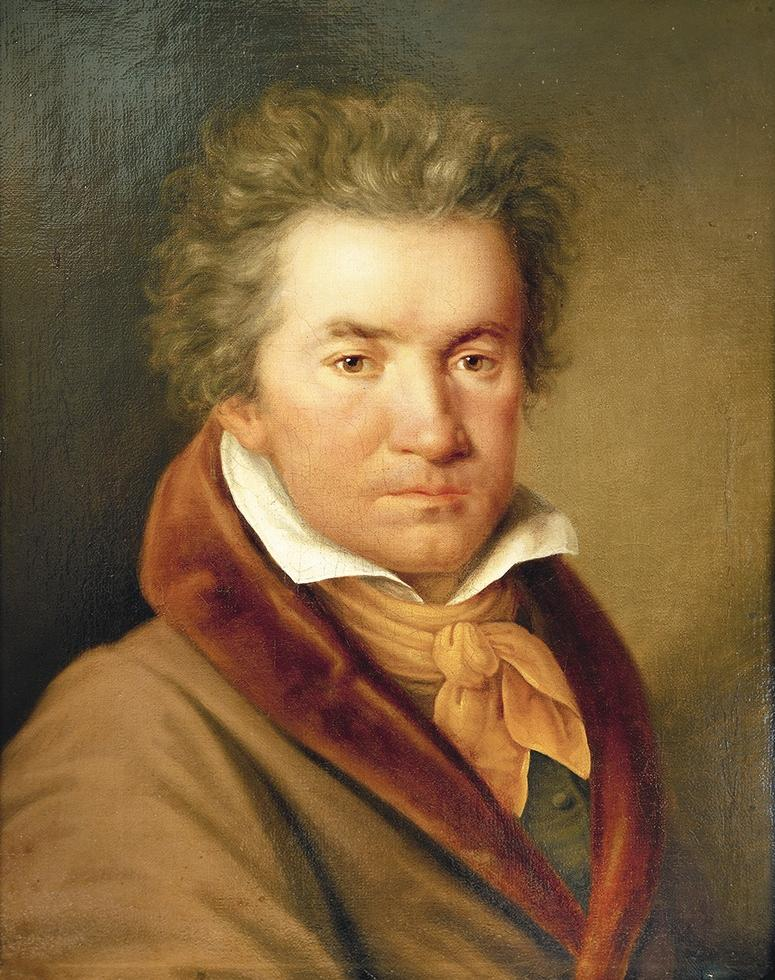
Portrait of Ludwig van Beethoven, 1815

The Allegretto for Piano Trio, WoO 39, in B♭ major is a composition for piano trio by Ludwig van Beethoven that was composed in 1812 as a gift for Maximiliane Brentano, the then ten-year-old daughter of his friend Antonie Brentano. Eight years later he also dedicated the Piano Sonata Op. 109 to Maximiliane. The composition was first published in 1830 by F. P. Dunst in Frankfurt, along with the Piano Trio in E♭ major, WoO 38, and the Piano Sonata in C major, WoO 51.

== Background ==
Beethoven composed the piece while travelling to Teplitz, where he intended to spend the summer. At the time, the Brentanos were resident in Karlsbad. He presented the work to the family on the 26 June 1812, prior to travelling to Prague. The exact reason for composing the piece is unclear, although Watson states in a footnote, that it was to encourage Maximiliane in her piano playing.

The composer's manuscript for this composition survives. Compared to most of his manuscripts, the music score of this piece is written neatly and can be read easily. Beethoven's suggested fingerings for piano is included in the manuscript.

== Structure ==
This composition is a single movement written in sonata form. The tempo mark is Allegretto. Performance takes about 5 minutes.
