= List of piano trios by Wolfgang Amadeus Mozart =

This is a list of piano trios by Wolfgang Amadeus Mozart.

- Kegelstatt Trio in E♭ major K. 498
- Piano Trio No. 1 in B♭ major K. 254
- Piano Trio No. 2 in G major K. 496
- Piano Trio No. 3 in B♭ major K. 502
- Piano Trio No. 4 in E major K. 542
- Piano Trio No. 5 in C major K. 548
- Piano Trio No. 6 in G major K. 564
