= Rudi Martinus van Dijk =

Dutch and Canadian composer

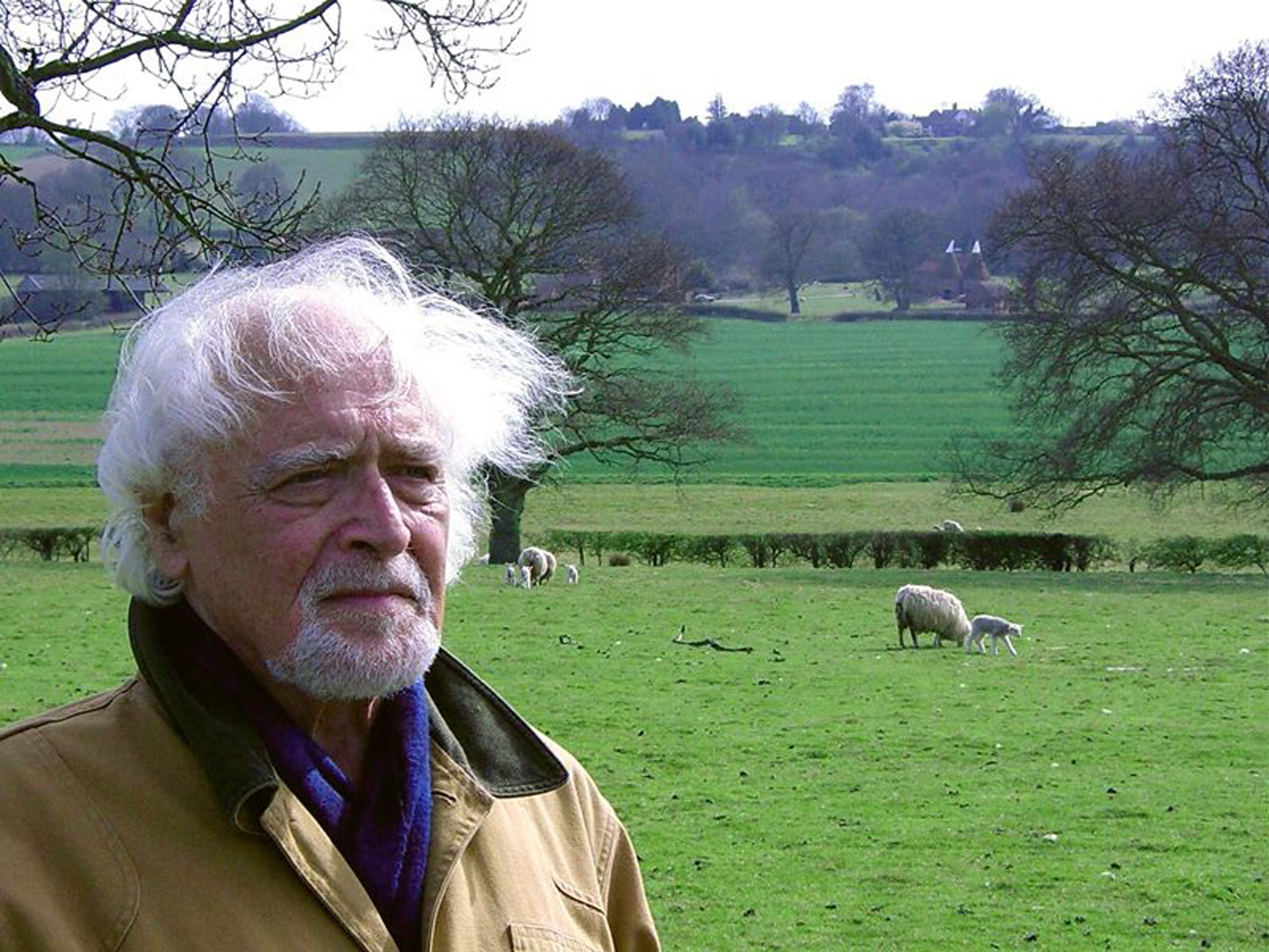
- Rudi Martinus van Dijk near his home in Peasmarsh, East Sussex, UK 2003
- Born: Martinus van Dijk; 27 March 1932; Culemborg, The Netherlands
- Died: 29 November 2003 (aged 71); Peasmarsh, East Sussex, United Kingdom
- Occupations: Composer and pianist
- Spouse: Jeanne van Dijk (née Koning) (1930- 2024)
- Children: Felix van Dijk (1954- ) Walter van Dijk (1961- )

Rudi Martinus van Dijk (27 March 1932 – 29 November 2003) was a Dutch and Canadian composer of orchestral, chamber and vocal music.

The voice of a highly original creator is heard in every Van Dijk music, regardless of his stylistic trends it favours. Béla Bartók noted that sources are less important in framing a composer's achievement than how he uses them. What makes Van Dijk's orchestral music at once beguiling and immediately recognisable as a personal expression is discernable on the smaller sound-scale of his chamber compositions. One of Van Dijk's most notable characteristics, a purposeful firmness of the bass line, imbues his music with an unfailing sense of logical and expressive direction, even in the context of a highly inflected harmonic chromaticism. It would take a bold annotator to pin Van Dijk's artistic origins down to one or other national or stylistic source. Van Dijk had unusual success blending an emotional intensity, at times evocative of the world of Austro-German expressionism, with a fascinating subtlety and indirectness of utterance suggestive rather of French affinities. From time to time, the analyst with a taste for such trouvailles may detect what seem like 12-note series in Van Dijk's writing. These are incidental consequences of his avoiding casual note-repetition, and are never exploited in systematic serial manner. Van Dijk is no follower of systems. Rather, he is a creator with the richly endowed imagination of a poet, a thinker, and a voracious reader to bring to expression, and the single mindedness needed to realise that aim.

One of the properties of mercury is that it does not amalgamate with the matter in which it has contact, but rather remains by its very nature intrinsically unadulterated in form. It is this unadulterated quality, which is the watermark of Rudi Martinus van Dijk's compositional creative process; a quality, which marks him as a composer belonging to all ages and, at the same time, to no age at all.

== Biography ==
=== Childhood and early musical career (1938–1955) ===
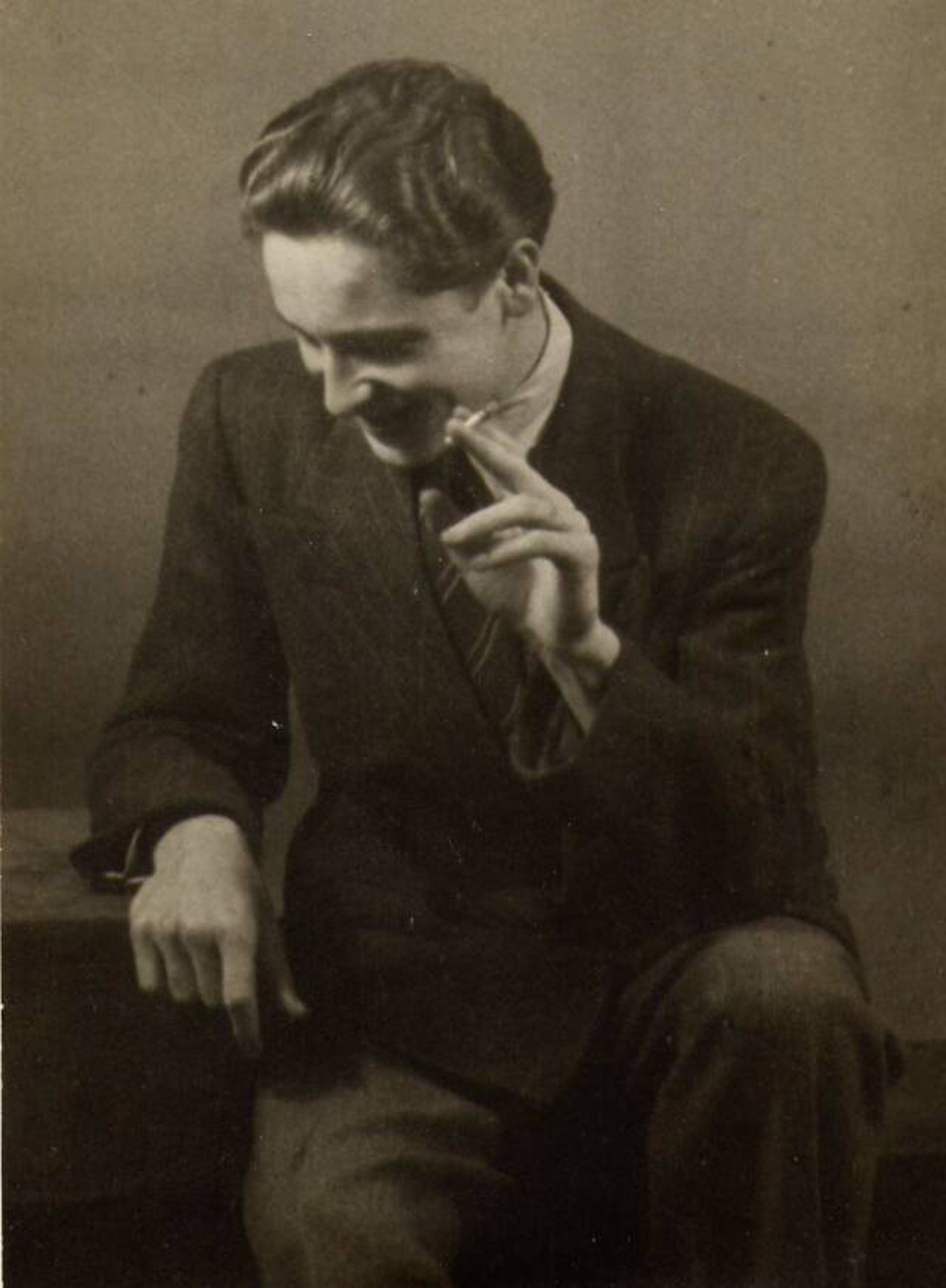
Rudi Martinus van Dijk in 1949

Van Dijk's musical background began on the piano at the age of six. In 1944, he took up preparatory piano studies with Corrie Vierdag at the Royal Conservatory of The Hague. From the age of 18, Van Dijk continued as a full-time student at the conservatory studying piano with Leon Orthel, oboe with Jaap Stotijn, and composition and analysis with Hendrik Andriessen. Van Dijk came to the fore as a composer when his Sonatina for piano was chosen and performed at the International Gaudeamus Music week in 1953. Later that year, he was engaged by the Canadian Army to join the Canadian Grenadier Guards Band as an oboist. He married Jeanne Koning and they moved to Ontario, Canada. As a bandsman, he also became a pupil (summer of 1955) of the American composer Roy Harris.

=== Early career and middle years in Canada and the United States (1955–1982) ===
On a regular basis in the 1950s and 60's, Van Dijk not only composed background music for educational programmes but used his improvisational skills as a pianist live on radio for the Canadian Broadcasting Corporation. This relationship would later culminate in the World premiere of his Four Epigrams for Symphony Orchestra (1962) with the CBC Symphony conducted by Walter Susskind as part of the CBC's National School Broadcast series Finding Out about Music. As an original musical work commissioned by the CBC, "The Four Epigrams for Symphony Orchestra point up the two main ingredients in a work composed with young listeners in mind: powerful, shifting rhythms, and dramatic colour contrasts."

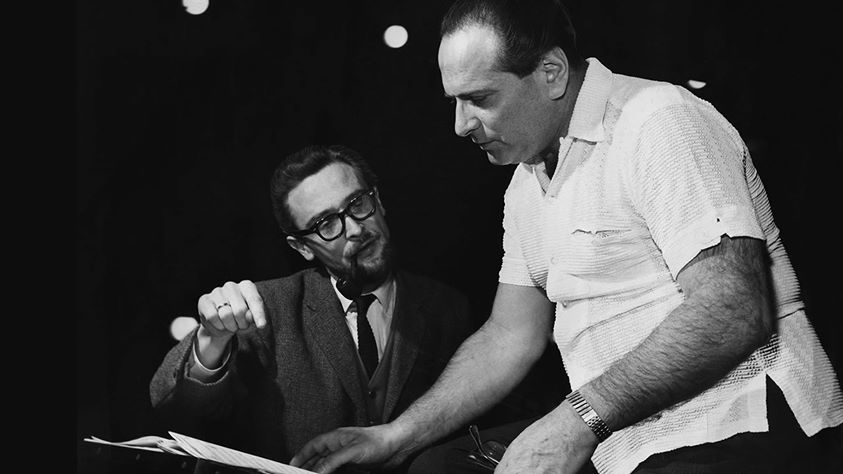
Rudi Martinus van Dijk with conductor Walter Susskind

The Canada Council enabled Van Dijk to further his composition studies in Paris (1964-1965) with Max Deutsch, a pupil of Arnold Schoenberg. During this time, he concluded his piano studies with Kendall Taylor in London. Between 1964 and 1966, Van Dijk also worked at the British Broadcasting Corporation, London in educational television programmes which were broadcast throughout the world. From 1966 onwards, teaching became part of his musical life. Van Dijk returned with his family to Canada and was appointed teacher of piano at the Royal Conservatory of Music in Toronto. He was commissioned by the CBC to write a cantata with librettist George Benson Johnston which Van Dijk would entitle Now is the Prophet's Time (1967). Its premiere took place in The Netherlands at the Philharmonie Haarlem with the Boy's choir of St. Bavo Cathedral, Groot Omroepkoor, and the Symfonieorkest Haerlem for Dutch radio broadcast conducted by Jan Stulen. In 1972, Van Dijk was appointed to the Faculty of Music at Indiana University. At this time, his composition Immobile Eden (1972), set to the composer's own text written for the Toronto Lyric Arts Trio, was first performed on National Public Radio in New York City in November 1975. From 1975 to 1981, Van Dijk taught Composition and Analysis at Berklee College of Music in Boston, and during this time his Movement for Alto saxophone and piano (1960) was given its premiere.

His Concertante for Flute, Harp, Percussion and Strings (1963) had its World Premiere at the Royal Alexandra Theatre in Toronto with the Toronto Chamber Orchestra and was televised live on CBC television in January 1964. The French flautist Jean-Pierre Rampal wrote in a letter to Van Dijk, "It is a very well constructed work and remarkably written for the flute." Its European premiere was given in the Netherlands in 1965 with flautist Koos Verheul and members of the Netherlands Radio Chamber Orchestra. It has been played numerous times in Canada, Finland, and the United States. Highlights of the 1978-79 season of the Toronto Symphony Orchestra include the world premiere of Van Dijk's The Shadowmaker (1977) under the direction of Mario Bernardi and featuring Canadian baritone Victor Braun. It was performed at Massey Hall in Toronto, October 1978. The work was set to a book of poems called The Shadowmaker written in 1969 by the Canadian poet Gwendolyn MacEwan. The biographer of MacEwan, Rosemary Sullivan, quotes Van Dijk in her book: "What attracted me to the poetry was the substance behind the subject matter - namely the dream. The poetry attempts, it seems to me, to lift the veil of 'Maya' (illusion). Is our sensuous experience reality or illusion? MacEwan has something in common with Strindberg and D.H. Lawrence, as an explorer of these dark corners of the soul that most of us shut out conveniently, in order to create a safe but illusory reality." As Dutch musicologist Maarten Brandt writes, "The bold and expressionistic side of Berg and Schoenberg is found in van Dijk’s The Shadowmaker for baritone and large orchestra, written in 1977. Yet, as in every single composition by van Dijk, tonal references are present here as well, demonstrating a kinship not only with Berg, but also with Britten, Henze, Tippett and Martin; all of them composers who have not simply exploited the resources available to them, but rather were grateful ‘inhabitants’ of a rich and saturated musical landscape."

In the summer of 1982, the Van Dijk's received word that their son Felix's fiancé (Leanne Salvucci) had died tragically in a fall. On the day of her death, Van Dijk began composing a violin concerto in her memory. The World premiere of his Violin Concerto (1984) would later be given on September 20, 1991, by the Polish violinist Robert Szreder with the Netherlands Radio Symphony Orchestra conducted by Jan Stulen in the Grote Kerk, Terneuzen as part of the Zeeuws Vlaanderen Festival. Maarten Brandt continues by mentioning the likeness to the Violin Concerto (Berg), "The work is elegiac in tone with musical bursts of hand-wringing tragedy. The regular recurrence of choral melodies inevitably bring to mind associations with the creator of Dem andenken eines Engels. Van Dijk shares with Alban Berg, a liberal and unorthodox treatment of what tradition has handed down. No matter how unshakable the connection between form and content, it is the content that determines the form in the music of van Dijk, and not vice-versa."

=== His return to Europe and last years in the United Kingdom (1985–2003) ===
In 1985, Van Dijk returned to Europe with his wife Jeanne. He spent a year focused on his compositions in Casares, Málaga, Spain after which he became composer in residence, taught piano and composition at Dartington Hall in Devon in the United Kingdom. Van Dijk's Irish Symphony (1990) was commissioned for radio broadcast by the RTÉ National Symphony Orchestra to celebrate Dublin as the European Capital of Culture 1991 and was supported by the Dutch funding body, the Fonds voor de Scheppende Toonkunst. It received its broadcast from the National Concert Hall in Dublin with the RTÉ National Symphony Orchestra conducted by Colman Pearce on Raidió Teilifís Éireann. The European premiere of Four Epigrams for Symphony Orchestra (1962) was given September 25, 1993, with the Residentie Orchestra in The Hague conducted by Jac van Steen. The Piano Concerto (1994) was given its world premiere on May 22, 1996, by the North Netherlands Symphony Orchestra with Australian pianist Geoffrey Douglas Madge conducted by Viktor Liberman. Maarten Brandt notes "Van Dijk’s brilliant Piano Concerto (also known as three Pieces for Piano and Orchestra) written for Bernard Jacobson, in which the melodic aspect is always primary and as a rule the harmony quickened by a pleasing melos."

In the United Kingdom, the Raphael Ensemble commissioned and gave the World premiere of his String Sextet in 1998 at the Brighton Festival, and in that same year British violinist Anthony Marwood commissioned and gave the World premiere of his Sonata for Violin and Piano at London's Wigmore Hall. In 2003, Van Dijk's 70th Birthday Concert was given in London's Purcell Room at the South Bank Centre which included performances of his music by pianist Kyoko Hashimoto, the Dante Quartet, and the British tenor Ian Partridge who gave the World premiere of Van Dijk's Songs of the Tao te Ching. Since then Anthony Marwood has performed his music a number of times on BBC Radio 3. In 2000, classical Indian Bharatanatyam dancer Mayuri Boonham commissioned Van Dijk The Triple Hymn based on a mantra from the Vedic literature to be performed on a UK tour and at the Spring Loaded Festival at the Place Theatre in London. Maarten Brandt writes: "The Triple Hymn is a vibrant dance duet. The music is written for cello, soprano, midrangam, tubular bell and gong, depicting a three-part manifestation of the Goddesses Gayatri, Savitri, and Sarasvati. The work plays on a cross-cultural edge and explores valuable territory. The score is rhythmically challenging, dynamically diverse and evocative."

As part of the International Chamber Music Series 2001 at the Concertgebouw in Amsterdam, Hyperion records artists the Florestan Trio performed Van Dijk's Piano Trio (2001) which they especially commissioned for the Florestan Festival of Peasmarsh in East Sussex.

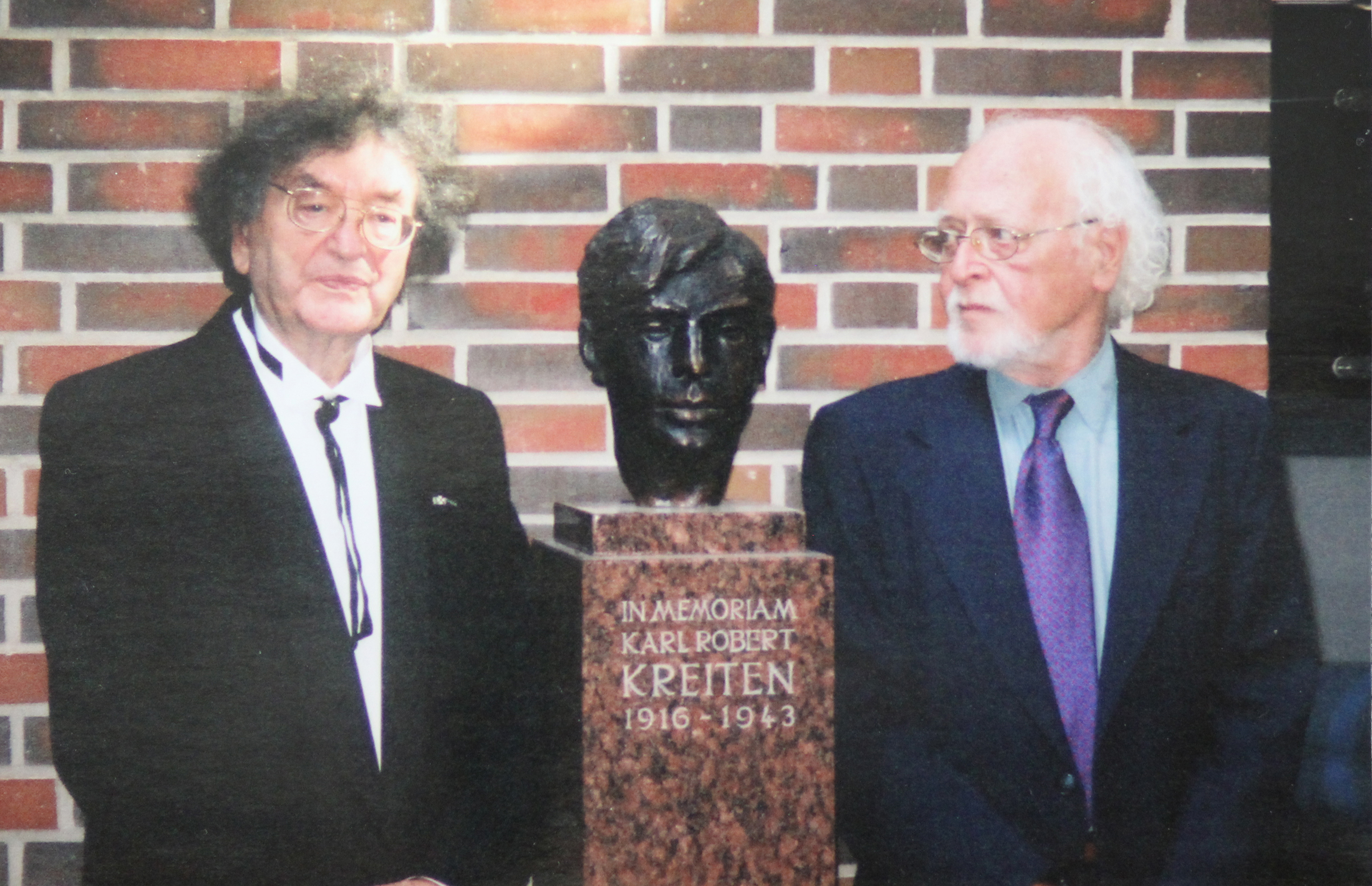
Heinrich Riemenschneider and Rudi Martinus van Dijk in the Tonhalle Düsseldorf at the World premiere of Kreitens Passion 2003

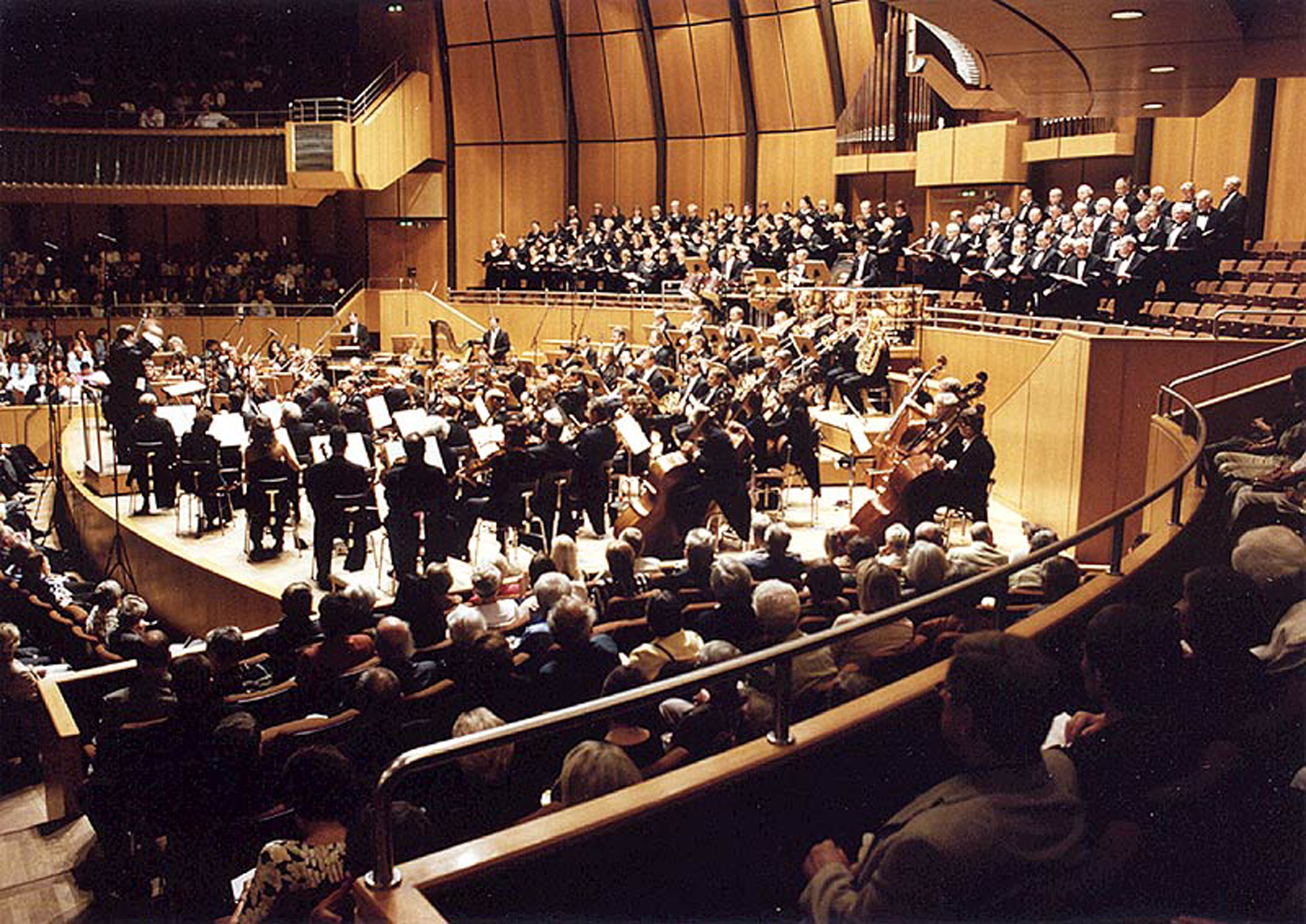
World premiere performance of Van Dijk's Kreitens Passion in the Tonhalle Düsseldorf with the Düsseldorfer Symphoniker, the Städtischer Musikverein zu Düsseldorf with conductor John Fiore and baritone Andreas Schmidt in October 2003

In 2002, Van Dijk was commissioned by the Düsseldorfer Symphoniker to write a large-scale work for baritone, full choir and orchestra to commemorate the German/Dutch pianist Karlrobert Kreiten. Kreiten was hailed by the conductor Wilhelm Furtwängler as one of the most talented pianists of his generation. Kreiten's life and career were tragically cut short when a Nazi neighbour reported him to the Gestapo for making negative remarks about Adolf Hitler and the war effort. He was arrested for treason by Nazi officers before a matinee performance of a Liszt Piano Concerto in Heidelberg. Kreiten was condemned to death and executed by hanging at the Plötzensee prison in Berlin in 1943. In 2003, Van Dijk spent the last year of his life completing the composition to be entitled Kreitens Passion, to text by German dramaturge Heinrich Riemenschneider. Van Dijk lived to attend all three performances at the World premiere of Kreitens Passion in the Tonhalle Düsseldorf performed by the Düsseldorfer Symphoniker, baritone Andreas Schmidt, and the American conductor John Fiore in October 2003. Van Dijk died a month later on November 29, 2003, in Peasmarsh, East Sussex.

Van Dijk was survived by his wife Jeanne Elisabeth Anna van Dijk-Koning, who died in 2024 at the age of 93 (born Voorburg, Netherlands September 4, 1930 – died Peasmarsh, East Sussex February 3, 2024) and his two sons Felix van Dijk (born Leidschendam, Netherlands, October 5, 1954–) and Walter van Dijk (born Toronto, Ontario, Canada May 20, 1961–).

The Rudi Martinus van Dijk Foundation is a fundraising charitable music foundation which sponsors aspiring composers and conductors who live in parts of the world where there is political strife and/or economic deprivation. On June 12th, 2025 the first recipient of the Koninklijke Conservatorium Rudi Martinus van Dijk Conductor's Prize will be presented to the young Cuban conductor César Eduardo Ramos in Amare in Den Haag.

== Notable works ==
- Four Epigrams for Symphony Orchestra (1962)
- Concertante for Flute and String Orchestra (1963)
- A Christmas Cantata (Now is the Prophet's Time) for solo tenor, school choir, mixed choir and orchestra (1967)
- Immobile Eden for soprano, flute and piano (1972)
- The Shadowmaker, four pieces for baritone and orchestra (1977)
- Concerto for violin and orchestra (1984)
- Irish Symphony in four movements for orchestra (1990)
- Concerto for piano and orchestra (1994)
- Kreiten's Passion for baritone, choir and orchestra (2003)

== Chamber works ==
- Sonatina for piano (1951)
- Sonata for Clarinet and piano (1955)
- Two Lieder for soprano and piano (1958)
- Movement for Alto saxophone and piano (1960)
- Le tombeau de Francis Poulenc : for piano four hands or 2 pianos, 1965 (1964)
- Bagatelle for piano (1969)
- Lament for a Dying Bird: Three pieces for solo clarinet (1979)
- Incantation for solo flute (1982)
- Sonata for Violin and piano (1995)
- Two pieces with interlude : for soprano, flute/piccolo/bass flute and piano (1995)
- Red, white and blues : Dutch new blues pieces, for piano (1996)
- String Sextet (1997)
- A touch of the Blues : for piano solo (1998)
- String Quartet in five movements (1999)
- Piano Trio : for violin, violoncello and piano (2001)
