= Jersey Chamber Orchestra =

Orchestra

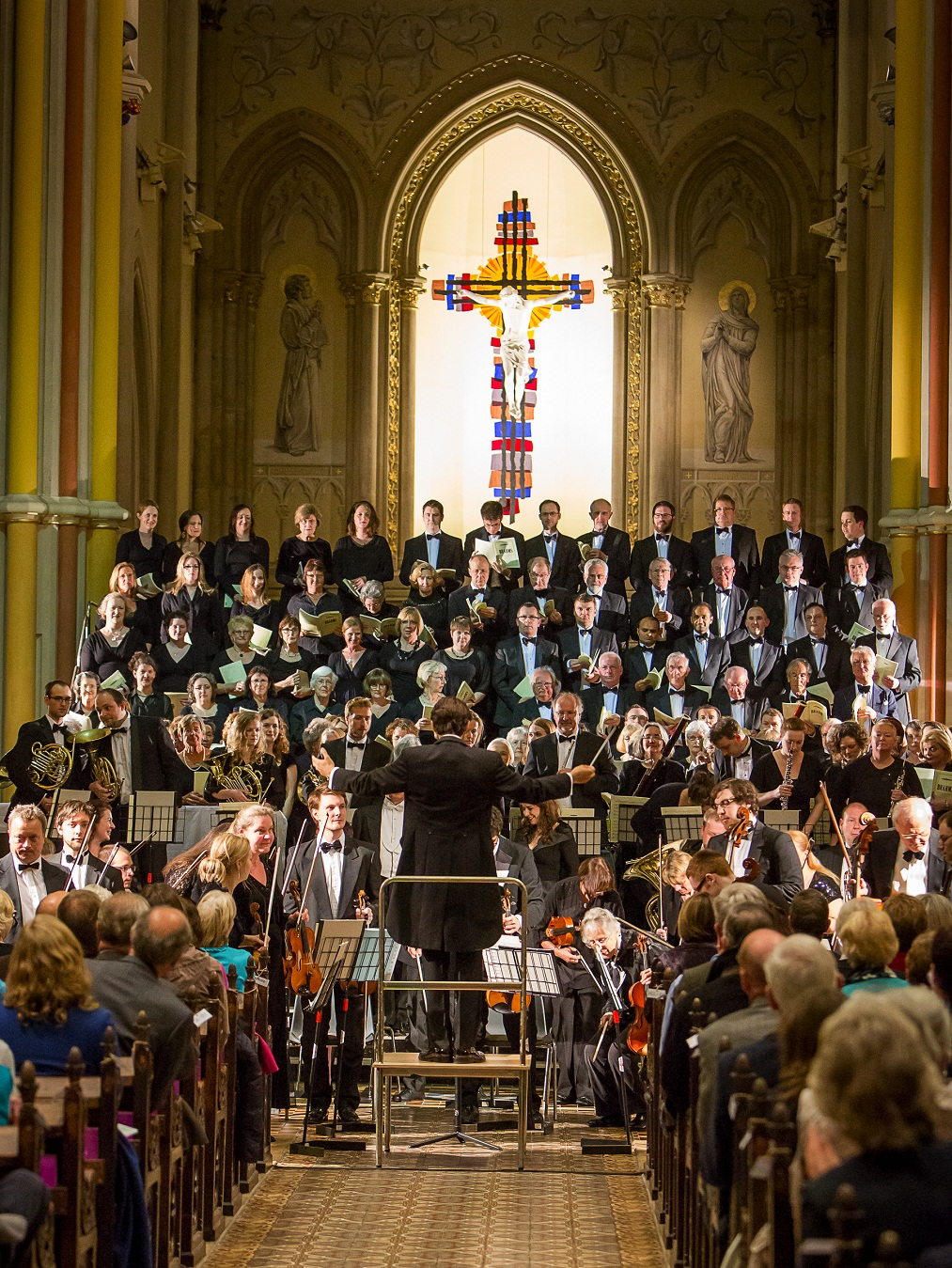
Jersey Chamber Orchestra - Taking a bow following a performance of the Brahms Requiem; St Thomas's Church, Jersey

The Jersey Chamber Orchestra is a semi-professional orchestra based in the island of Jersey. The orchestra's music director is the Israeli conductor and violinist Daniel Cohen.

== History ==
The orchestra was founded in 2007 as part of the charity Music in Action. The aims of Music in Action are to promote and support the development of music in Jersey by organising popular cultural events of high quality, while promoting and supporting other Jersey charities. Every year they provide opportunities for local children to be educated and inspired by the visiting professional musicians. The orchestra performs as part of the annual Liberation Festival.

== Soloists ==
The orchestra has played with soloists of international renown, including:

- Elizabeth Watts (soprano)
- Nicola Benedetti (violin)
- Natalie Clein (cello)
- Graeme Danby (bass)
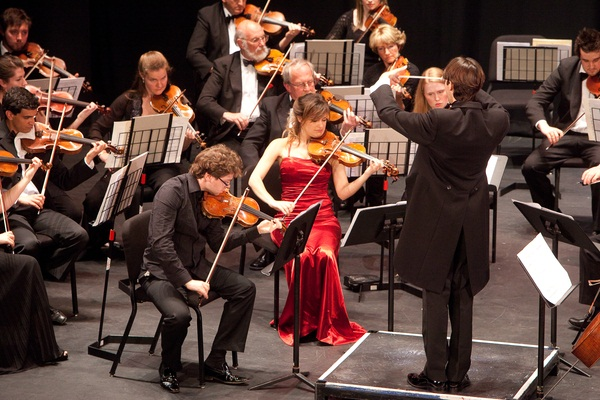
Nicola Benedetti and Alexander Sitkovetsky playing with the Jersey Chamber Orchestra as part of the Liberation Festival.

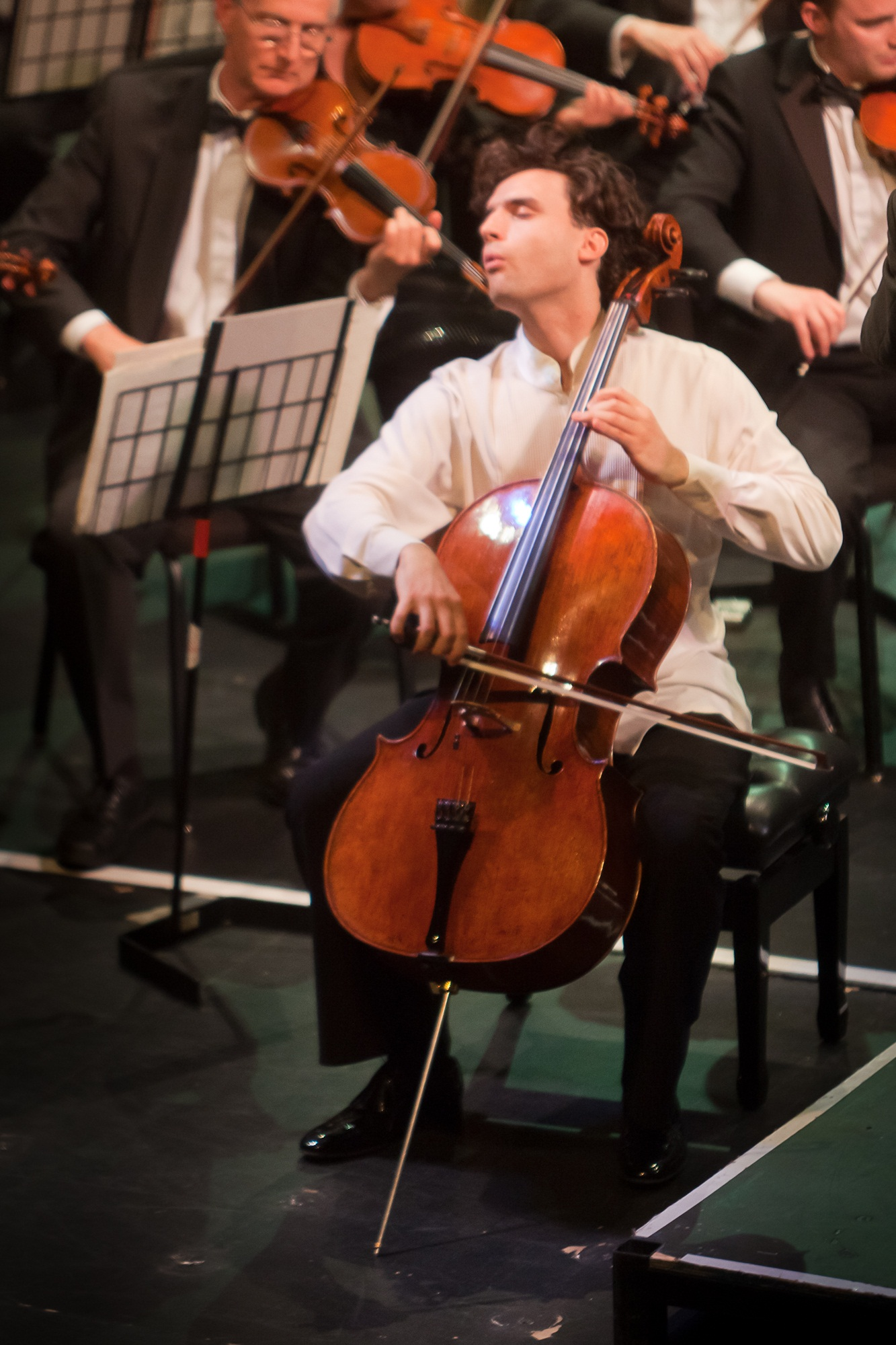
Leonard Elschenbroich

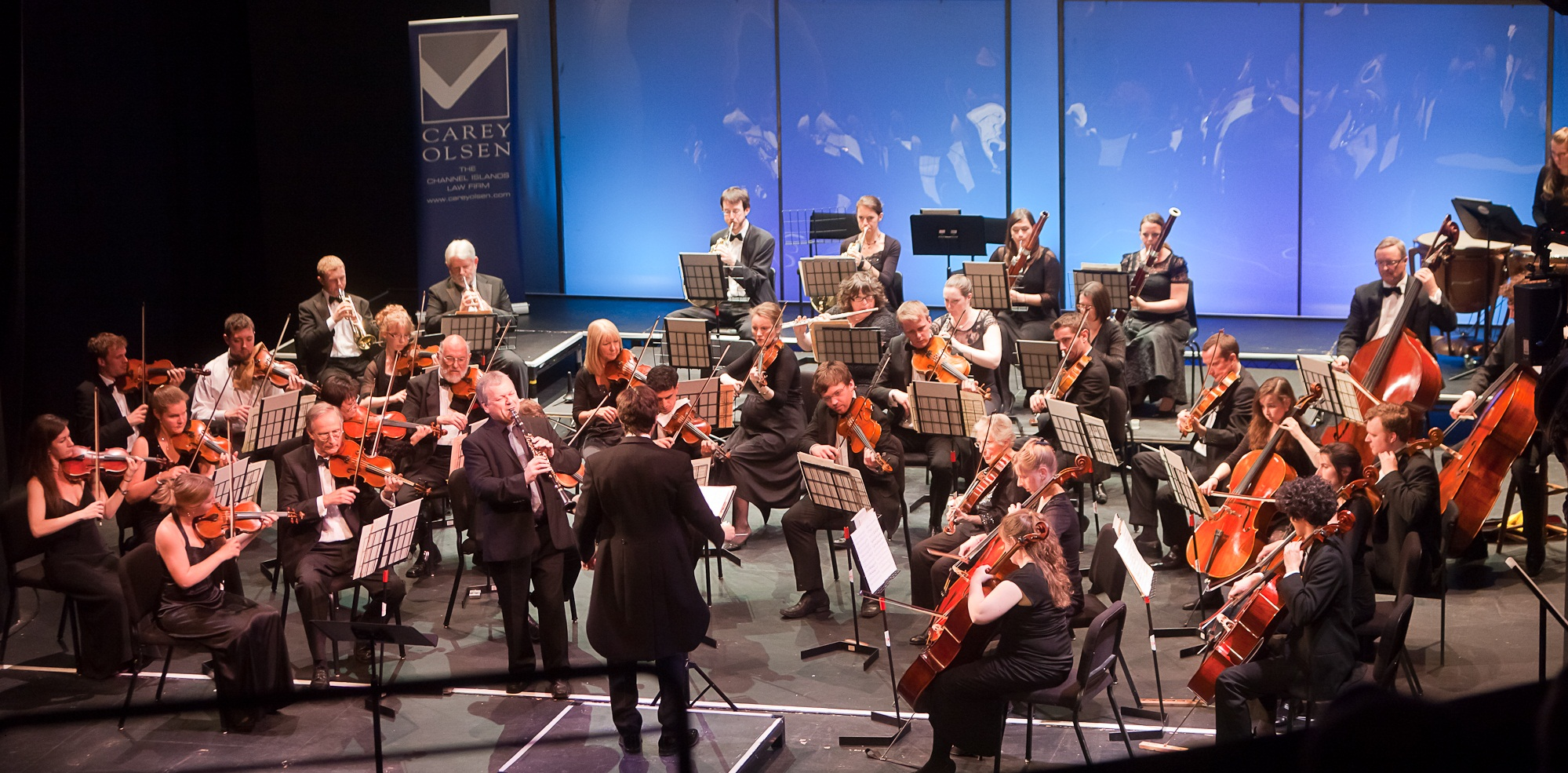
Michael Collins
