= Piano trio =

Musical group of piano and two other instruments

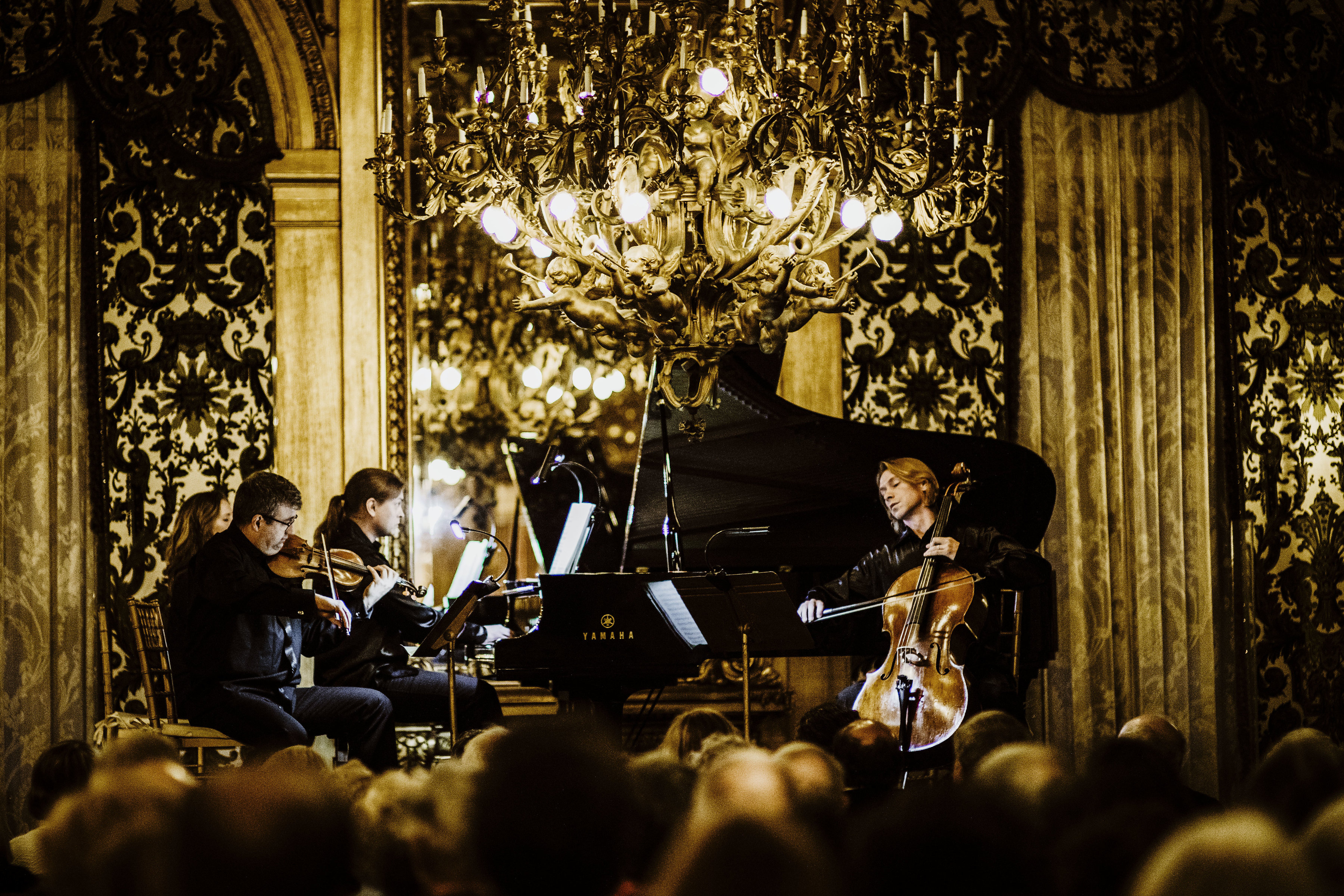
The Hermitage Piano Trio performs at Marble House

A piano trio is a group of piano and two other instruments, usually a violin and a cello, or a piece of music written for such a group. It is one of the most common forms found in classical chamber music. The term can also refer to a group of musicians who regularly play this repertoire together; for a number of well-known piano trios, see below.

The term "piano trio" is also used for jazz trios, where it most commonly designates a pianist accompanied by bass and drums, though guitar or saxophone may figure as well.

== Form ==
Works titled "Piano Trio" tend to be in the same overall shape as a sonata. Initially this was in the three movement form, though some of Joseph Haydn's have two movements. In five late works, Wolfgang Amadeus Mozart is generally credited with transforming the accompanied keyboard sonata, in which the essentially optional cello doubles the bass of the keyboard left hand, into the balanced trio which has since been a central form of chamber music. With the early 19th century, particularly Ludwig van Beethoven, this genre was felt to be more appropriate to cast in the four movement form. Piano trios that are set in the Sonata tradition share the general concerns of such works for their era, and often are reflective directly of symphonic practice with individual movements laid out according to the composer's understanding of the sonata form.

In the Classical era, home music-making made the piano trio a very popular genre for arrangements of other works. For example, Beethoven transcribed his first two symphonies for piano trio. Thus a large number of works exist for the arrangement of piano, violin and violoncello which are not generally titled or numbered as piano trios, but which are nonetheless part of the overall genre. These include single movements as well as sets of variations such as Beethoven's Kakadu Variations Op. 121a and Variations in E♭ major Op. 44.

After the Classical era, works for piano and two instruments continue to be written which are not presented as in the sonata tradition, or are arrangements of other works. Many of these individual works are popular on concert programs, for example Joseph Suk's Elegy.

== The role of the three instruments ==
The piano trios of the Classical era are dominated by the piano part. The piano is so central in Haydn's trios that they are nicknamed "accompanied sonatas". The violin plays the melody only a certain amount of the time, and when it does, is often doubled by the piano. The cello part is very much subordinated, usually just doubling the bass line in the piano. It is thought that this practice was related to the sonority of the instruments of Haydn's day: the piano was fairly weak and "tinkling" in tone, and benefited from the tonal strengthening of other instruments. Mozart's five late trios (K. 496 etc.) are generally felt to mark the assured arrival of the form, attentive to balanced voices and three-part dialogue.

Beethoven's trios continued the compositional objectives inaugurated by Mozart. The new idea of equality was never implemented completely; the extent to which it is realized varies from one composition to the next, as well as among movements within a single composition.

Authentic performances of earlier trios are now done on period instruments.

== Other combinations ==
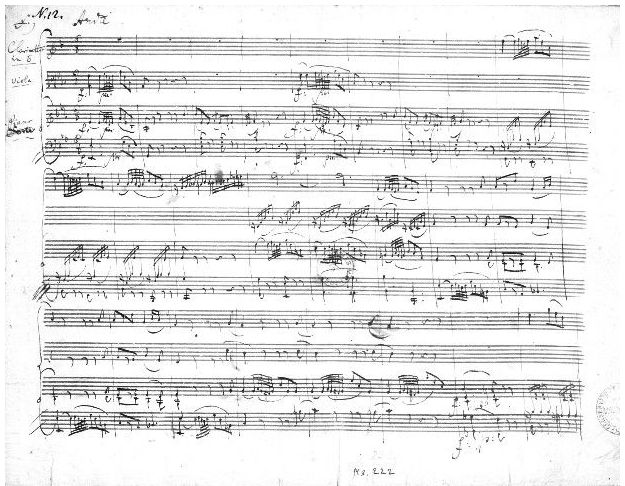
The first page of the autograph of Mozart's Kegelstatt Trio

Some rather rare combinations of instruments have nonetheless inspired a few significant works.

- Haydn wrote three trios for flute, cello and piano (H. 15/15-17), a combination for which Carl Maria von Weber also wrote one work (op. 63).
- Beethoven wrote his Trio in G major, WoO 37 (1786) for flute, bassoon and piano.
- Mikhail Glinka wrote his Trio pathétique in D minor for clarinet, bassoon and piano, although is also performed with a violin or cello substituting the clarinet or the bassoon, respectively.
- Francis Poulenc's Trio for oboe, bassoon and piano op. 43 (1926).
- The Horn-violin-piano trio is exemplified by Brahms' Trio Op. 40 in E♭ and György Ligeti's 1982 Trio for Violin, Horn and Piano.
- Trios with clarinet include masterpieces such as Mozart's Kegelstatt Trio and works by Beethoven, Brahms and Bartók; many more works are listed in Clarinet-violin-piano trio, Clarinet-viola-piano trio and Clarinet-cello-piano trio.
- Ignaz Lachner wrote all of his six piano trios for violin, viola and piano.
- The Indonesian composer Ananda Sukarlan has written several trios with piano of rare combinations, such as Menage a Trois for flute, viola and piano, Mutahariana for clarinet, french horn and piano, Communication Breakdown for flute, bassoon and piano or Frida's Monkeys for oboe, violin and piano.
- The jazz trio formation of saxophone, piano and percussion has been taken up as an alternative "piano trio" in the field of contemporary classical music, initially by Trio Accanto who since 1994 have commissioned more than 100 works for this combination. Several other trios have been formed to perform this repertoire.

== Example piano trios, extant and defunct ==
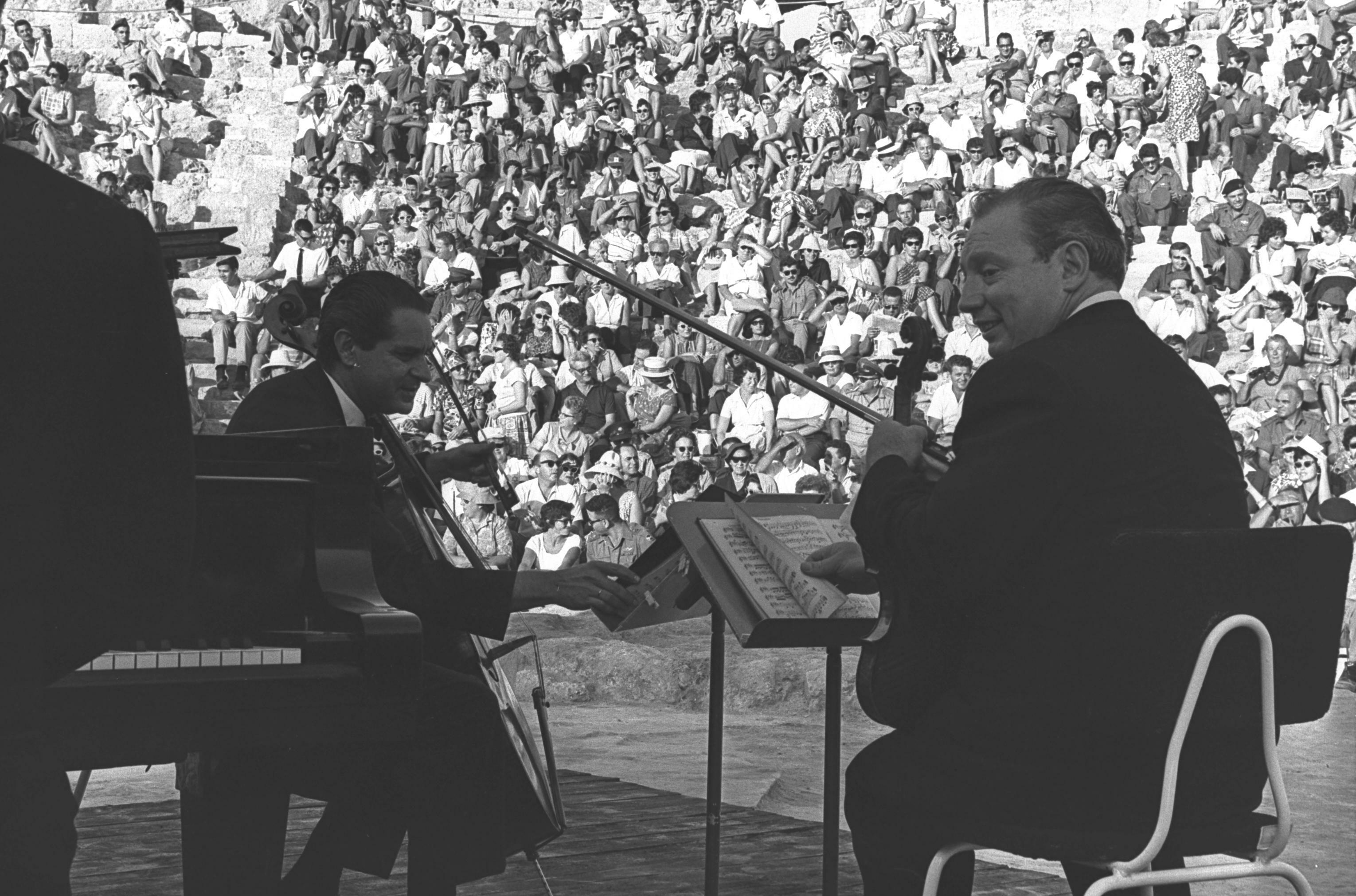
Istomin-Stern-Rose Trio playing at Caesarea theatre, 1961

Among the best known of such groups are or have been:

- Altenberg Trio (Austria)
- Amatis Trio (the Netherlands)
- ATOS Trio (Berlin, Germany)
- Maria Baptist [jazz] Trio (Berlin, Germany)
- Istomin-Stern-Rose Trio, consisting of Eugene Istomin, Isaac Stern and Leonard Rose. (United States)
- One consisting of Alfred Cortot, Jacques Thibaud and Pablo Casals, earlier in the 20th century
- The Spivakovsky Trio, consisting of Jascha Spivakovsky, Tossy Spivakovsky and Edmund Kurtz, earlier in the 20th century
- The Kalichstein-Laredo-Robinson Trio (United States)
- The Beaux Arts Trio (United States), whose commitment to using the same players in every concert pioneered a new generation of similarly committed groups; defunct
- The Sitkovetsky Trio (United Kingdom) consisting of Alexander Sitkovetsky, Wu Qian and Isang Enders
- Trio di Trieste (Italy) consisting of Dario De Rosa, Renato Zanettovich, and Libero Lana/Amedeo Baldovino; defunct
- The "Ax-Kim-Ma" trio, consisting of Emanuel Ax, Young-Uck Kim, and Yo-Yo Ma (United States)
- Eroica Trio (United States)
- Ahn Trio (United States/Korea)
- The Borodin Trio (United States)
- Trio Fontenay (Germany)
- Trio Céleste (United States), consisting of Kevin Kwan Loucks, Iryna Krechkovsky, and Ross Gasworth
- Suk Trio (Czech Republic)
- The Florestan Trio (United Kingdom)
- The Greenwich Trio (United Kingdom)
- The Gryphon Trio (Canada)
- The Oberlin Trio (United States)
- The Alma Trio (United States)
- Trio Vega (Spain)
- Trio Kandinsky (United States)
- Trio Wanderer (France)
- Haydn Trio Eisenstadt (Austria): Harald Kosik, Hannes Gradwohl, Bernd Gradwohl/Verena Stourzh.
- Bamberg Trio (Germany)
- Petrof Piano Trio (Czech Republic)
- Manhattan Piano Trio (United States)
- Spirale Piano Trio (Belgium)
- Xonor Trio (United States)
- Vanic Trio (United States)
- Vienna Piano Trio (Austria)
- Stuttgart Piano Trio (German)
- The Dutch Trio (Germany/The Netherlands)
- Trio con Brio Copenhagen (Denmark)

== Famous works for piano trio ==
- Anton Arensky's Piano Trio No. 1 in D minor
- Ludwig van Beethoven's trios, especially Piano Trio No. 7 in B♭ major "Archduke", Op. 97
- Johannes Brahms's Piano Trios No. 1 in B major, Op. 8, No. 2 in C major, Op. 87 and No. 3 in C minor, Op. 101
- Elliott Carter's Epigrams (2012)
- Frédéric Chopin's Piano Trio in G minor, Op. 8
- Antonín Dvořák's Piano Trio No. 4 in E minor ("Dumky"), Op. 90
- Gabriel Fauré's piano trio, Op. 120
- Joseph Haydn's 45 piano trios, particularly those composed from the mid-1780s onwards
- Charles Ives's Piano Trio, 1911
- Franz Liszt's Hungarian Rhapsodies No. 9 and No. 12
- Felix Mendelssohn's two piano trios
- Wolfgang Amadeus Mozart's piano trios, particularly No. 3, 4 and 5
- Sergei Rachmaninoff's Elegiac Trios No. 1 in G minor and No. 2 in D minor
- Maurice Ravel's Trio for Piano, Violin and Cello
- Camille Saint-Saëns's Piano Trio No. 1 and Piano Trio No. 2
- Franz Schubert's Piano Trio No. 1 and No. 2
- Clara Schumann's Piano Trio
- Robert Schumann's Piano Trio No. 1 in D minor and Piano Trio No. 3 in G minor
- Dmitri Shostakovich's Piano Trio No. 2 in E minor
- Bedřich Smetana's Trio for Piano, Violin and Cello
- Pyotr Ilyich Tchaikovsky's Piano Trio in A minor, Op. 50

== See also ==
- Piano six hands
- Violin
- Violoncello
- Piano trio repertoire
- Triple concerto for violin, cello, and piano
- Clarinet–violin–piano trio
- Clarinet–viola–piano trio
- Clarinet–cello–piano trio
- Oboe–bassoon–piano trio
- Piano quartet
- Piano quintet
- Piano sextet
