= Piano Trio No. 1 =

Piano Trio No. 1 may refer to:

- Piano Trio No. 1 (Arensky)
- Piano Trio No. 1 (Beethoven)
- Piano Trio No. 1 (Brahms)
- Piano Trio No. 1 (Dvořák)
- Piano Trio No. 1 (Mendelssohn)
- Piano Trio No. 1 (Mozart)
- Piano Trio No. 1 (Schubert)
- Piano Trio No. 1 (Schumann)
- Piano Trio No. 1 (Shostakovich)
