= Piano Trio No. 6 =

Piano Trio No. 6 may refer to:

- Piano Trios, Op. 70 (Beethoven)
- Piano Trio No. 6 (Mozart)
