= K254 =

K254 or K-254 may refer to:

- K-254 (Kansas highway), a state highway in Kansas
- HMS Ettrick (K254), a former UK Royal Navy ship
- K.254 Piano Trio No. 1 (Mozart) in B♭ major (1776)
