= Variations in E-flat major (Beethoven) =

1804 composition by L. v. Beethoven

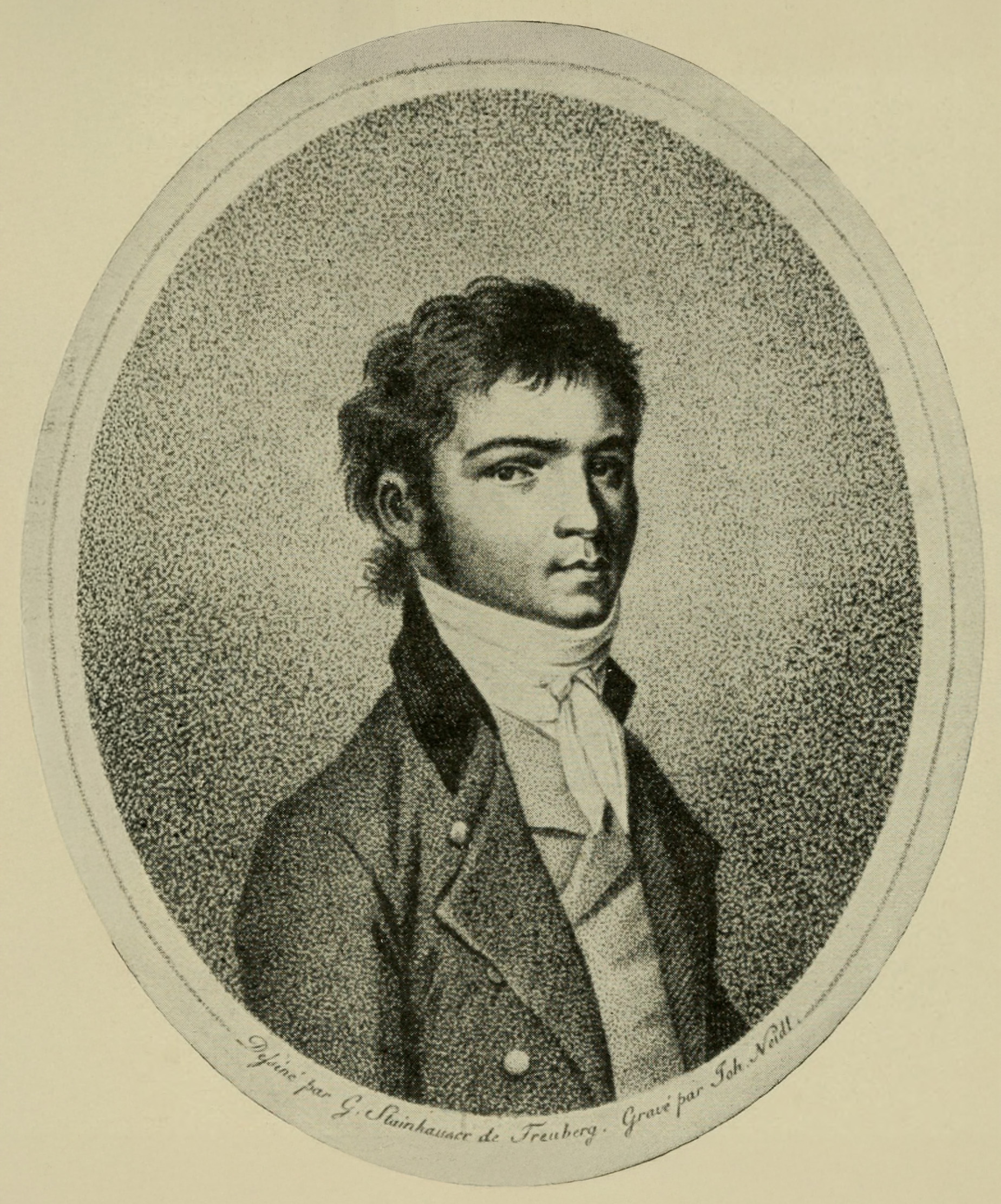
Ludwig van Beethoven, c. 1796

The Variations in E♭ major piano trio, Op. 44, by Ludwig van Beethoven, is a series of fourteen variations on a theme, written for piano, violin and cello. Although this may be one of Beethoven's early works (written circa 1792, i.e., at around age 22), it was assigned its opus number when it was published in 1804 by Hoffmeister in Leipzig more than a decade after Beethoven began writing it.

Following common practice at the time, in this work Beethoven incorporated variations on popular themes from opera, notably from Das rote Käppchen (The Red Cap), a Singspiel by Carl Ditters von Dittersdorf, which had its premiere in Vienna in 1788. The opera reached Bonn in 1792, during the last months that Beethoven stayed there. Beethoven took one of the most popular pieces of this opera, a small segment of melody of "Ja, ich muss mich von ihr scheiden" (Yes, I must leave her), as the starting point for this trio. This line is from an aria sung by the village mayor Hans Christoph Nitsche, who announces that he must leave his wife. Beethoven's variations were probably finished when he left Bonn – a short sketch from 1792 has survived – but were published as Op. 44 in 1804.

The theme, in E♭ major, is a series of simple unadorned arpeggios in octave unisons by all three players. Beethoven then develops fourteen variations, decorative in the tradition of the eighteenth century but with contrasting spirit and textures employed. The tenth variation, syncopated and vigorous, is followed by an almost exaggeratedly reserved dialogue while the twelfth variation's gentle ambling is interrupted by a burst of coarse fortissimo. This work includes two slow variations in E♭ minor (Nos. 7 and 13). The final variation begins allegro in 6/8, dynamic and joyful, interrupted by a brief interlude marked andante. The conclusion is marked presto, led by the piano.

The playing time of these variations is usually 13 to 14 minutes.

== Recordings ==
- Beaux Arts Trio, 1965 (Philips)
- Daniel Barenboim piano, Pinchas Zukerman violin, Jacqueline du Pré cello, 1969 (EMI Classics)
- Wilhelm Kempff piano, Henryk Szeryng violin, Pierre Fournier cello, 1969 (Deutsche Grammophon)
- Isaac Stern, Leonard Rose, Eugene Istomin, 1970 (Columbia Records)
- Borodin Trio, 1984 Chandos
- Vladimir Ashkenazy piano, Itzhak Perlman violin, Lynn Harrell cello, 1986 (EMI Classics)
- Guarneri Trio Prague, 1999 (Harmonia Mundi)
- The Florestan Trio, 2004 (Hyperion Records)
- Trio Wanderer, 2012 (Harmonia Mundi)
