= Piano Trio No. 1 (Saint-Saëns) =

Trio piano, violin and cello by Camille Saint-Saëns

- Piano trio by Camille Saint-Saëns
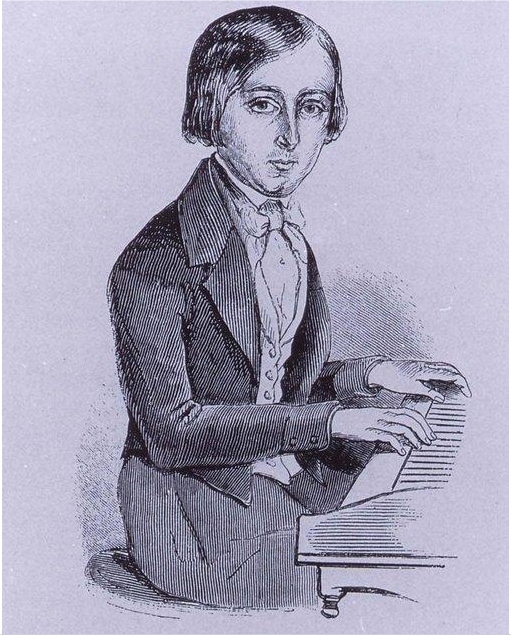
- Camille Saint-Saëns in 1846
- Key: F major
- Opus: 18
- Composed: October 1864
- Dedication: Alfred Lamarche
- Published: November 1867 (J. Maho)
- Movements: Four
- Scoring: piano; violin; violoncello

Premiere
- Date: 20 January 1865
- Location: Salle Pleyel, Paris
- Performers: Camille Saint-Saëns; Pablo de Sarasate

The Piano Trio No. 1 in F major, Op. 18 is a piano trio by French composer Camille Saint-Saëns. Written in 1864 during a trip to the Pyrenees and Auvergne, the trio is dedicated to Alfred Lamarche, a family friend who cared for Saint-Saëns's mother during his absences. The work, scored for piano, violin, and violoncello, was premiered in 1865 at Salle Pleyel in Paris and published in 1867. The trio consists of four movements: Allegro vivace, Andante, Scherzo (Presto), and Allegro.

== History ==
Camille Saint-Saëns composed his Piano Trio No. 1 in F major, Op. 18 in October 1864 during a trip to the Pyrenees and Auvergne. The work is dedicated to Alfred Lamarche, a family friend who cared for Saint-Saëns's mother during the composer's absences. The trio is scored for piano, violin, and violoncello and was published in Paris by Jacques Maho in November 1867.

The première of the Piano Trio No. 1 took place on 20 January 1865 at Salle Pleyel, featuring Saint-Saëns and Pablo de Sarasate. Saint-Saëns himself performed the trio on various occasions, including concerts in St. Petersburg (1876), London (1876), Antwerp (1878), Edinburgh (1904), and Athens (1920).

In his correspondence, Saint-Saëns mentioned playing the trio with notable musicians such as Henryk Wieniawski, Jacques Thibaud, and Louis Hasselmans. He also expressed his satisfaction with the work, describing a performance in Edinburgh as "delightful". The trio was transcribed for piano duet by A. Benfeld in 1885.

== Structure ==
The Piano Trio No. 1 is composed of four movements:

1. Allegro vivace
2. Andante
3. Scherzo: Presto
4. Allegro

The first movement, Allegro vivace, begins with a steady three-four rhythm established in the first four bars before the violoncello introduces a light-hearted melody, which is then repeated by the violin and the piano. The piano, after concluding its amplified version of the theme, introduces another theme, "little more than a figure, which undergoes considerable development throughout the movement."

The second movement, Andante, is described as "quite short and charmingly fresh." The piano begins by stating the theme in unisons against a sustained octave A on the violin. The viola then enters, doubling the melody on the piano, while the violin sings the tune accompanied by the piano and viola. A contrasting subject, "a flowing melody given entirely to the strings," is introduced before a brief repetition of the first subject concludes the movement.

The third movement, a scherzo marked Presto, is characterized by its "varied themes and epigrammatic style," with a fragment of the first theme from the Andante appearing inconspicuously. The movement maintains "a condition of suppressed excitement" and features "much brilliant writing, particularly for piano."

The trio finishes with a final Allegro. Much of this movement is to be played quietly, before the trio concludes emphatically with a molto allegro section.

== Reception ==
Watson Lyle described the trio as expressing "the pure happiness of a care-free mind amid congenial surroundings, rather than the confidence that is born of arrogance, or of the grim determination to succeed."
