= Werner Höfer =

German journalist

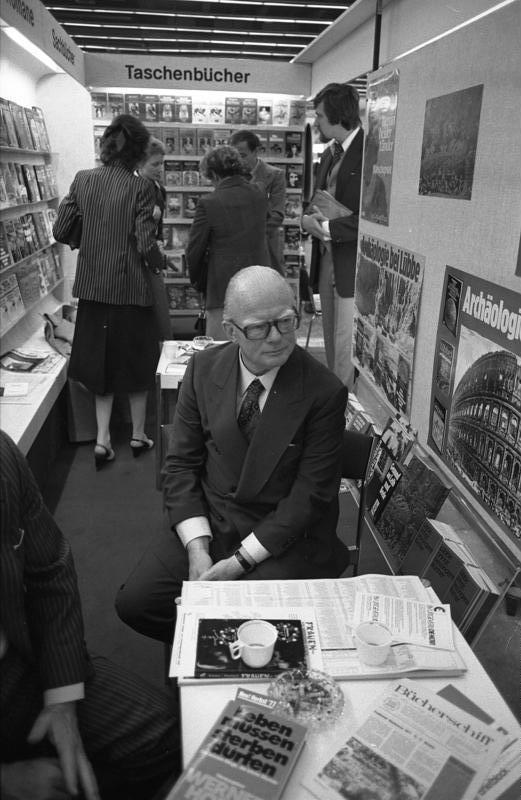
Höfer at the Frankfurt Book Fair 1977

Werner Höfer (21 March 1913, in Kaisersesch, Rhine Province – 26 November 1997, in Cologne) was a German journalist. He started his career as a Nazi propagandist, working for the newspaper Das Reich. From 1933 to 1945 he was a member of the Nazi Party.

After the war, he worked for the public broadcasting institutions Nordwestdeutscher Rundfunk and Westdeutscher Rundfunk. He gained popularity as the host of the Sunday TV discussion show Internationaler Frühschoppen, modeled on NBC's Meet the Press and running from 1952 to 1987. When his publicly expressed satisfaction upon the execution of pianist Karlrobert Kreiten in September 1943 became known to a wider public, he was forced to retire in 1987.

His daughter Candida Höfer is a well known photographer.
