= Piano Trio (Ives) =

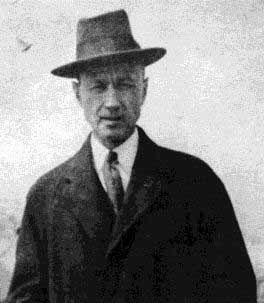
Charles Ives in 1913

The Trio for Violin, Cello, and Piano is a work by the American composer Charles Ives. According to his wife, the three movements of the piano trio are a reflection of Ives’ college days at Yale. He started writing the piece in 1904, six years after graduation, and completed it in 1911. It was written c.1909–10 and significantly revised in 1914–15.

== Movements ==
The piano trio consists of three movements.

1. Moderato
2. TSIAJ ("This scherzo is a joke"). Presto
3. Moderato con moto

The first movement is constructed of three successive segments. In the first, the violin is silent, the cello is silent for the second, and all three instruments join for the third, with adjustments made to the piano melody originally heard in the first segment, as well as the violin melody that returns from the second segment.

The second movement, TSIAJ, employs polytonality, timbral contrast, and quotation for a downright humorous effect. Fragments of American folk songs are intertwined throughout the movement, although often grotesquely altered with respect to rhythm, pitch, and harmonic connotation. Folk songs appearing in the scherzo include "My Old Kentucky Home", "Sailor's Hornpipe", "The Campbells Are Coming", "Long, Long Ago", "Hold the Fort". and "Praise for the Fountain Opened", among many others. Drawing from his college days at Yale University, Ives also quotes a number of fraternity songs including the Delta Kappa Epsilon tune "A Band of Brothers in DKE", which appears prominently near the beginning of the movement. It is notable that one of his sketches for the movement includes the subtitle "Medley on the Campus Fence", referring to the songs popular among Yale students during his college years. And although the composer himself acknowledged that the entire movement was a joke, it well characterizes the unique and novel musical world that only Ives had discovered.

The lyricism of the final movement of the piano trio contrasts strongly with the variegated montage of tunes in TSIAJ. Sweeping lyrical melodies alternate with lighter syncopated sections after the opening introduction and violin recitative. Nonetheless, Ives continues with his borrowing habits – quoting music that he had originally written for the Yale Glee Club (though it was rejected) in the lyrical violin-cello canon in bars 91–125. The coda quotes Thomas Hastings’ “Rock of Ages” in the cello, ending the movement with Ives’ characteristic rooting in American folk and popular music.
