= Eden Sinfonia =

- Orchestra
- Founded: 2004
- Location: London, England
- Principal conductor: Daniel Cohen
- Website: www.edensinfonia.com

The Eden Sinfonia is a professional orchestra based in London, England, founded in 2004 by Music Director Daniel Cohen.

The orchestra's programs extend from the Baroque to the 21st century, and its size changes from chamber to symphony orchestra. The Eden Sinfonia also aims to introduce British audience to Israeli and Middle-Eastern classical music.

A champion of new music, the Eden Sinfonia, is responsible for British and world premieres of piece by young and established composers such as Matan Porat , Mark Kopytman, Aaron Holloway Nahum , Tzvi Avni, Paul Ben-Haim, Michael Wople and many others. These collaboration is formed out of the belief "it is only through the constant search for new musical language that we can ensure the preservation of our timeless classics.'"

The Eden Sinfonia has performed in venues such as St Martin in the fields, St James's Piccadilly, Duke's Hall, and the Shaw Theater, and had its debut at the Queen Elizabeth Hall in November 2008 as part of the Musical Dialogues Festival.
