= Hermitage Piano Trio =

- Origin: New York, USA
- Genres: Classical, World music
- Years active: 2011–present
- Label: Reference Recordings
- Members: Misha Keylin (violin); Sergey Antonov (cello); Ilya Kazantsev (piano)
- Website: hermitagepianotrio.com

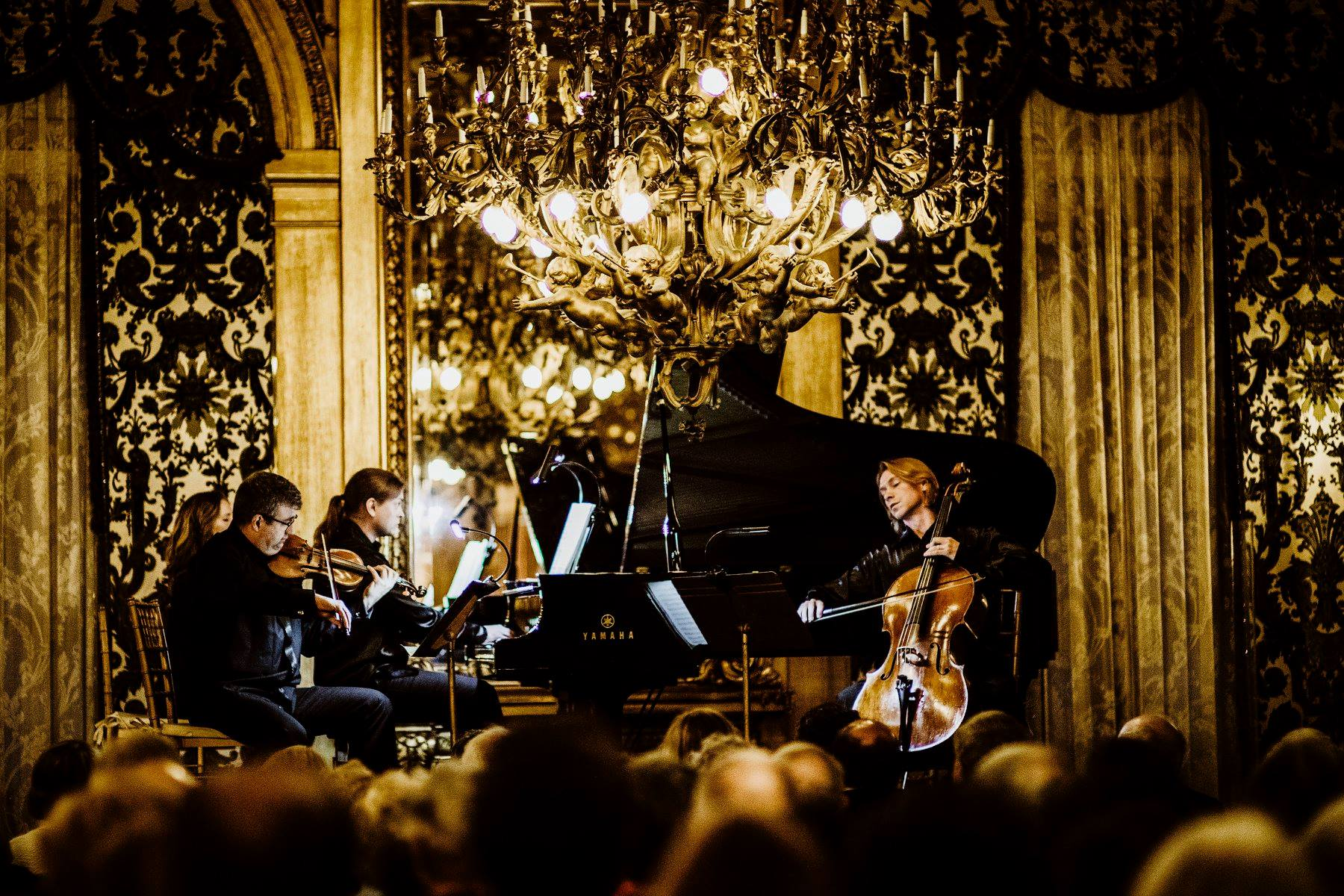
Hermitage Piano Trio in Concert

Hermitage Piano Trio is an American piano trio, whose work has been nominated for three Grammy Awards. It is one of the few full-time piano trios based in the United States, performing a wide range of classical music repertoire. The members that comprise the trio are Misha Keylin (violin), Sergey Antonov (cello) and Ilya Kazantsev (piano).

== History ==
Hermitage Piano Trio was founded in 2011 by three musicians, who are noted soloists in their own right. Violinist Misha Keylin studied at The Juilliard School in New York, cellist Sergey Antonov was a student at Longy School of Music in Boston and pianist Ilya Kazentsev attended the Manhattan School of Music, also located in New York. Individually, they were able to achieve international performance careers. Although they are all Russian-born, they are now US Citizens and are living in the United States. As a Trio, their big break came in 2012 after The Washington Post described their performance at the Philips Collection in Washington, D.C., as "three of Russia's most spectacular young soloists ... turned in a performance of such power and sweeping passion it left you nearly out of breath".

Today, the Trio is known for performing repertoire ranging from the works of the great European tradition to more contemporary American pieces. Some of the composers are the likes of Beethoven, Brahms, Dvorak, Tchaikovsky, Mendelssohn, Ravel, Schubert and many others. They tour regularly throughout the United States, Canada, Europe and the Far East. Recently, the Trio has started to explore works by early American composers who have been overlooked. Some of those composers are Horatio Parker, Amy Beach, Vittorio Giannini. In addition to their extensive touring engagements, the Trio is involved in educational and outreach projects.

In 2020, the Trio was nominated for three Grammy Awards for their debut classical recording album titled "Rachmaninoff", which was released on the Reference Recordings label. The recording consists of the piano trios of Sergei Rachmaninoff: Trio élégiaque No. 1 in G minor; Trio élégiaque No. 2 in D minor, Op. 9; and Vocalise. The album was also positively reviewed by various international publications such as The Absolute Sound, The Strad, Gramophone

In September 2023, Hermitage Piano Trio released their second album for Reference Recordings, titled "Spanish Impressions". In it, they explore the rich and diverse musical heritage of early 20th century Spanish composers, including works by Enrique Arbós, Joaquín Turina, Gaspar Cassadó and Mariano Perelló.

The Trio continues to work with Reference Recordings label on future releases, as part of their multi-album agreement.

== Discography ==
- (2019) Rachmaninoff (Reference Recordings)
