= Manhattan Piano Trio =

- Origin: New York City
- Genres: Classical
- Years active: 2004—present
- Labels: Marquis Classics
- Members: Wayne Lee, Sæunn Thorsteinsdóttir, Milana Strezeva
- Past members: Dmitry Kouzov, Dmitry Lukin
- Website: www.manhattanpianotrio.com

The Manhattan Piano Trio is a New York-based piano trio formed in 2004. Its current members are violinist Wayne Lee, cellist Sæunn Thorsteinsdóttir, and pianist Milana Strezeva.

The trio is the winner of the ABC Classic FM Listeners Award at the 2007 Melbourne International Chamber Music Competition, the 2006 Plowman Chamber Music Competition, and the 2007 Yellow Springs Chamber Music Competition in Yellow Springs, Ohio.
