= Daniel Cohen (conductor) =

Israeli conductor

- דניאל כהן
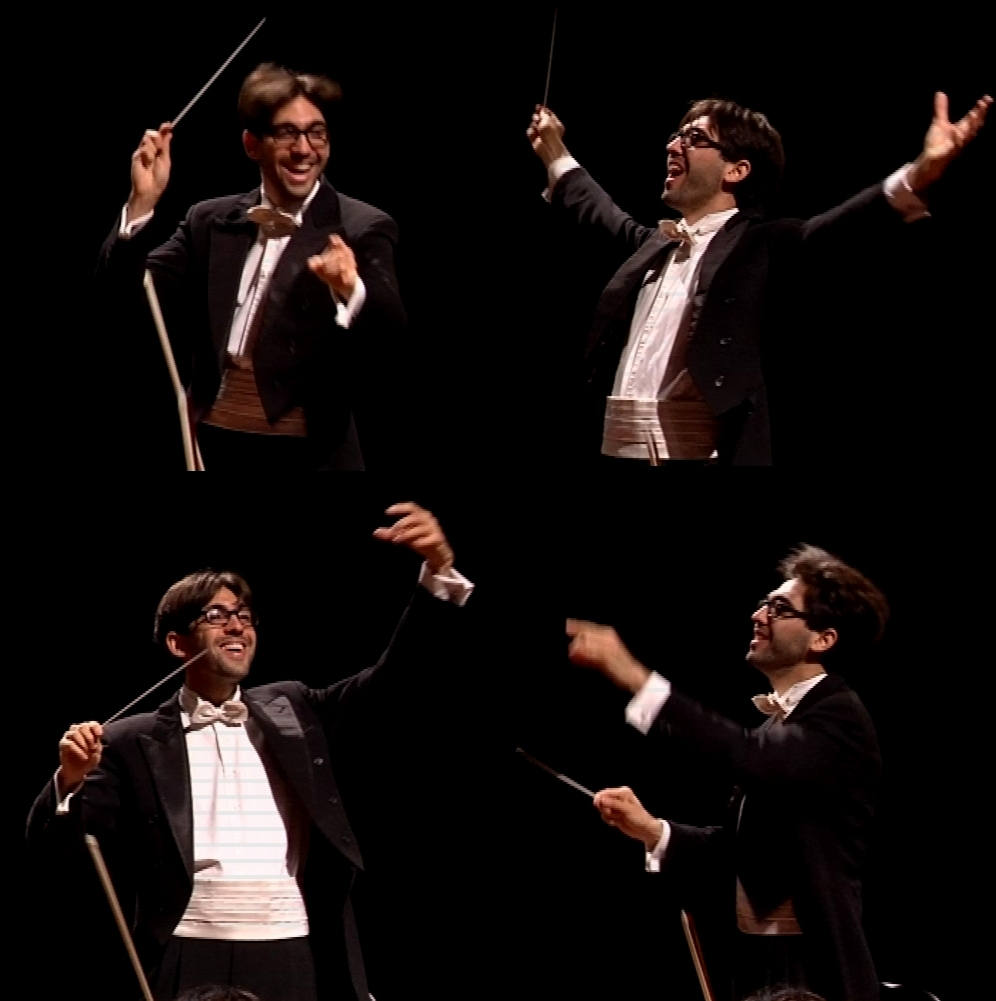
- Born: February 18, 1984 (age 42); Netanya, Israel
- Occupations: conductor, violinist

Daniel Cohen (Hebrew: דניאל כהן; born February 18, 1984) is an Israeli conductor and violinist. He is the general music director (GMD) of Staatstheater Darmstadt in Germany, former Kapellmeister at the Deutsche Oper Berlin for the 2015–2017 seasons, and a Gustavo Dudamel Fellow of the Los Angeles Philharmonic for the 2012–13 season, former music director of the Jersey Chamber Orchestra and the founder and artistic director of the Gropius Ensemble.

== Conducting career ==
Since his conducting debut at the age of 19, Cohen has conducted such orchestras as the Los Angeles Philharmonic, the Staatskapelle Berlin, the Maggio Musicale Fiorentino, the Helsinki Philharmonic, the Israel Philharmonic Orchestra, the Orchestre de Chambre de Lausanne, the Orchestra del Teatro Massimo in Palermo, the West Australian Symphony Orchestra, the Dresdner Philharmonie, the RTÉ National Symphony Orchestra and the Orchestra dell'Arena di Verona.

Cohen was a Kapellmeister at the Deutsche Oper Berlin from 2015 until 2017, where he conducted numerous performances of such operas as Così fan tutte, Don Giovanni, Die Zauberflöte, Il barbiere di Siviglia, Dornröschen, Lucia di Lammermoor, La traviata and G. F. Haas' new opera Morgen und Abend.

His operatic highlights include an acclaimed debut with the Canadian Opera Company with Christopher Alden's production of La clemenza di Tito, a new production of Die Zauberflöte with Graham Vick at the Macerata Opera Festival. In 2019 Cohen made his debut with the Norwegian Opera in Oslo conducting Le nozze di Figaro in Thaddeus Strassberger's production.

At the Israeli Opera he conducted such operas as: Tchaikovsky's Pique Dame, Shostakovich's Lady Macbeth of Mtsensk, Verdi's La traviata, Rigoletto and Otello and Berg's Wozzeck. Cohen also conducted the Israeli Opera Studio productions of Rossini's La Cenerentola and Mozart's Le nozze di Figaro.

== Early life and musical education ==
Cohen was born in Natanya, Israel, in 1984. He studied music from an early age, beginning on the piano at the age of 6 and switching to the violin at the age of 7. At the age of 14 he became the youngest student at the Tel-Aviv Academy of Music, studying violin under Haim Taub and composition under Isaac Sadai. At age 16 he started his conducting studies with Yevgeny Zsirlin at the Jerusalem Academy of Music.

At the age of 19 Cohen received his bachelor's degree (summa cum laude) from the Tel Aviv Academy. During his years at the academy he was an active violinist and chamber musician, performing as a soloist with various orchestras including the Israel Philharmonic Orchestra, the Israel Chamber Orchestra and the Haifa Symphony Orchestra.

In 2004 Cohen completed his postgraduate degree in violin at the Royal Academy of Music in London. The following year Cohen joined the conducting class of the Royal Academy and in 2007, aged 23, he completed his conducting studies there. Among his teachers were George Hurst, Colin Metters and Sir Colin Davis.

Whilst at the Royal Academy, Cohen formed the Eden Sinfonia, a student orchestra with which he performed numerous concerts, including, in 2008, a performance at the Queen Elizabeth Hall in London.

== West-Eastern Divan Orchestra ==
Cohen joined the West-Eastern Divan Orchestra in the summer of 2003, aged 19. He was a member of the first violin section for the next eight years and played in more than twelve international tours. Among many other concerts, Cohen participated in the memorable Ramallah Concert of 2005.

Between 2008 and 2011 Cohen became assistant conductor to Daniel Barenboim in the preparation of a Beethoven symphonies cycle as well as major works by Schoenberg and Boulez with the West-Eastern Divan Orchestra. In the summers of 2010–11 Cohen assisted Barenboim in creating a young version of the Divan Orchestra called the Al Andalus Orchestra which he conducted for two summers.

== Lucerne Festival Academy ==
Cohen served as an assistant conductor to Pierre Boulez and the musicians of the Ensemble InterContemporain at the Lucerne Festival Academy from 2009 to 2013. During his time at the Lucerne Festival Academy he also assisted such conductors as Péter Eötvös, Susanna Mälkki, Pablo Heras-Casado, and David Robertson.

From 2011 to 2013 Cohen also took part in the Lucerne Festival Academy Composer Project in which Pierre Boulez oversaw the commission, creation, composition, rehearsal and performance of new compositions. One of these: Sawti'l zaman by Benjamin Attahir was dedicated to Boulez and to Cohen and conducted by Cohen at the Lucerne Culture and Congress Centre in Lucerne in September 2013.

== Awards and prizes ==
Cohen won the America-Israel Cultural Foundation scholarship consecutively from 1995 to 2007. As a violinist Cohen received the 2004 DipRAM award for outstanding final recital (violin) from the Royal Academy of Music, London.

As a conductor Cohen won the first prize at the Admont International Conducting Competition, Austria (2007), the first prize at the Aviv Competition in Israel, the Yuri Aharonowich Prize (2008), and the third prize at the Evgeny Svetlanov Conducting Competition, Montpelier, France (2010).

== Discography ==
- Hindemith: Clarinet Concerto - Clarinet Quartet - Clarinet Sonata. With Sharon Kam and the Frankfurt Radio Symphony. (Orfeo, C210041, 2021)
