= Karlrobert Kreiten =

German musician, executed for making critical remarks about Hitler (1916–1943)

Karlrobert Kreiten

Karlrobert Kreiten (26 June 1916, Bonn, Rhine Province – 7 September 1943) was a German pianist, albeit holding Dutch citizenship his entire life due to his Dutch father.

== Biography ==
He was regarded by Claudio Arrau and others to be one of the most talented young pianists in Germany. Born in Bonn, his German mother was the classical singer Emmy Kreiten, née Liebergesell, who sang under the stage name Emmy Kreiten-Barido. His father Theo Kreiten, was a Dutch composer, pianist, and professor at the conservatory. The Kreiten family originated in the area of the Lower Rhineland, near the current Dutch-German border.

His debut at the age of eleven in the Düsseldorf planetarium was also a live broadcast. He was educated in Berlin by Claudio Arrau.

Kreiten was reported to the Gestapo by a friend of his mother for making negative remarks about Adolf Hitler and the war effort. He was indicted at the Volksgerichtshof, with Roland Freisler presiding, and condemned to death. Once a student of the famous pianist Claudio Arrau, Karlrobert Kreiten had influential friends. But even the intervention of the equally famous conductor Wilhelm Furtwängler couldn't prevent his arrest and execution. Friends and family frantically tried to save his life, but to no avail. The family only accidentally learned that Karlrobert had been put to death by hanging with 185 other inmates at Plötzensee Prison. An appeal for clemency was approved a day following the execution.

Emmy Kreiten, Karlrobert's mother, later showed fellow musicians an invoice she had received from the prison: The family actually had to pay the prison fees, even for the rope used to hang her son. Everything itemized in Reichsmark, line by line, down to the last Reichspfennig.

Because family members of an executed "traitor" couldn't be safe from regime terror, Theo and Emmy Kreiten and their daughter Rosemarie emigrated to Alsace, returning to Düsseldorf after war's end. His execution triggered a wave of articles in the German press about this "treacherous" artist. Prominent journalist Werner Höfer had to retire in 1987 when his articles which expressed satisfaction upon the execution of Kreiten received publicity.

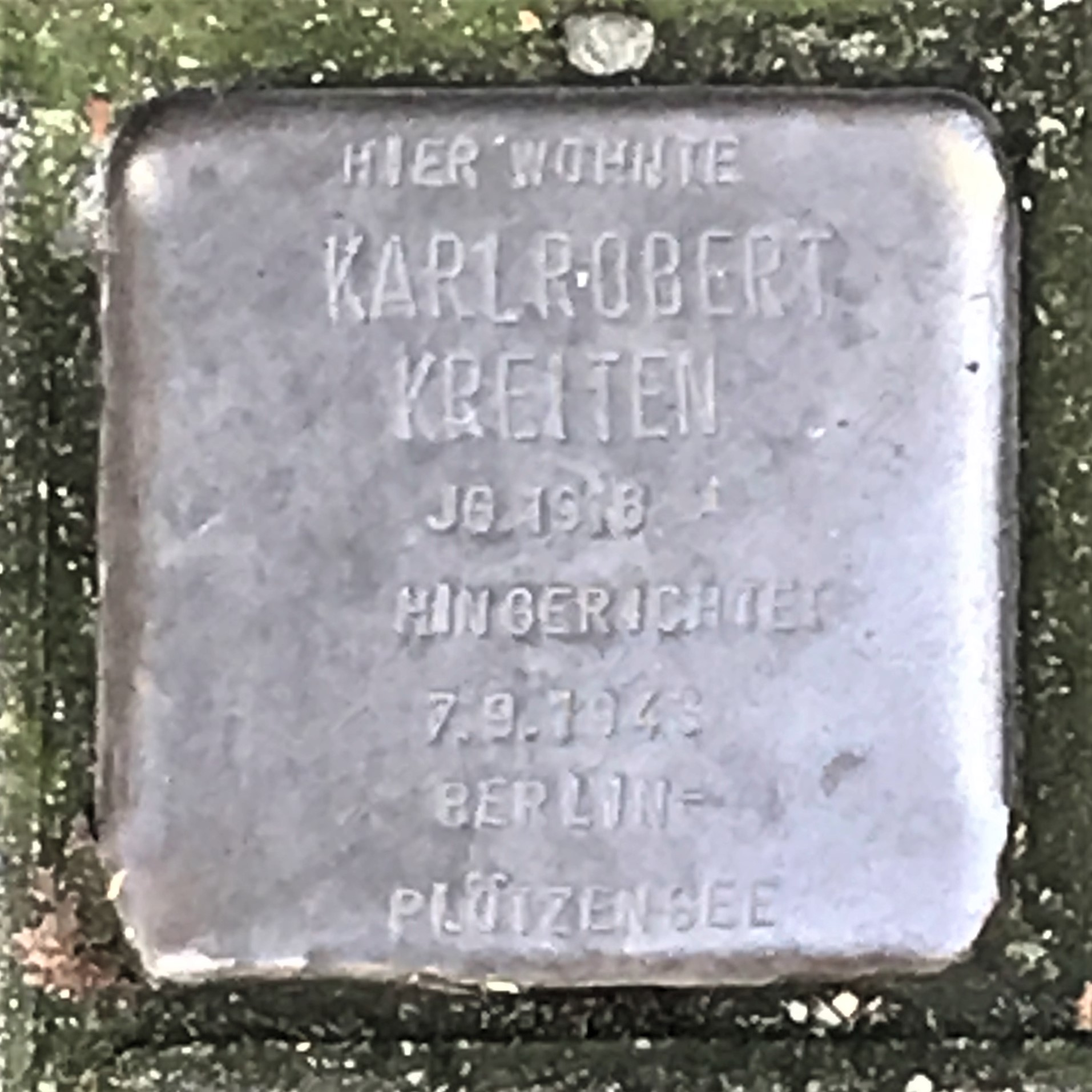
Stolperstein for Karlrobert Kreiten in the Rochusstraße, Düsseldorf-Pempelfort.

Today in Berlin, a memorial of the life and death of Kreiten exists along the "Topography of Terror" outdoor exhibit, which deals with the terror inflicted by the German SS and the Gestapo. The very prison cells that held him and others arrested by the Gestapo have been unearthed and remain laid bare for all to see. Streets in Düsseldorf, Bonn, and Cologne have been named in his honor.

In September 2003 the Dutch composer Rudi Martinus van Dijk had his work Kreiten's Passion for baritone, full choir and symphony orchestra premiered in Düsseldorf by the Düsseldorf Symfoniker in memoriam of Karlrobert Kreiten.
