= Sitkovetsky Trio =

Piano trio

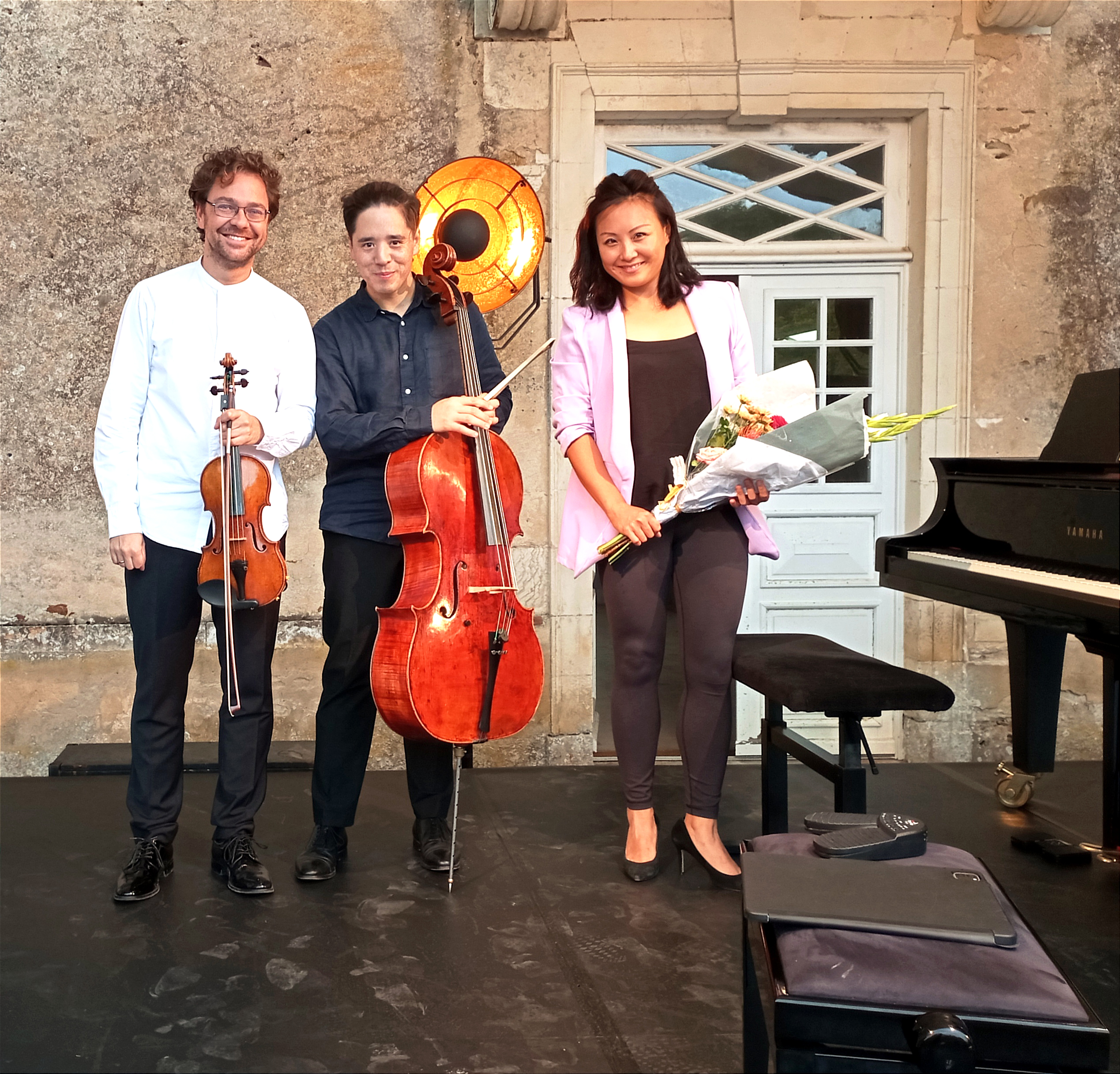
- Sitkovetsky Trio, 2023. Jardins du Logis du Fenestreau. France.
- Members: Alexander Sitkovetsky, Isang Enders, Wu Qian

The Sitkovetsky Trio is a piano trio, formed by students at the Yehudi Menuhin School in 2007.

== Members ==
In 2018, the trio consisted of Alexander Sitkovetsky (violin), Leonard Elschenbroich (cello), and Wu Qian (piano). In 2019 a new cellist, the German-Korean Isang Enders, joined the group after Leonard Elschenbroich’s departure.

== Awards ==
- First prizewinner of the International Commerzbank Chamber Music Award 2008
- Recipients of the Nordmetall Chamber Music Award at the Mecklenburg Vorpommern Festival 2009
