= Raphael Ensemble =

String sextet

The Raphael Ensemble is a classical string sextet formed in 1982 that concentrates on expanding the representation of popular and neglected works of the quintet and sextet repertoire. Their debut recording of Brahms' String Sextets was selected for BBC Radio 3's Critics' Choice of 1989. They have also performed at the Edinburgh International Festival.

Its members are:

- James Clark, violin
- David Adams, violin
- Louise Williams, viola
- Ralf Ehlers, viola
- Andrea Hess, cello
- Timothy Gill, cello
