= History of sonata form =

Sonata form is one of the most influential ideas in the history of Western classical music. Since the establishment of the practice by composers like C.P.E. Bach, Haydn, Mozart, Beethoven, and Schubert and the codification of this practice into teaching and theory, the practice of writing works in sonata form has changed considerably.

== Late Baroque era (ca 1710 – ca 1750) ==
Properly speaking, sonata form did not exist in the Baroque period; however, the forms which led to the standard definition did. In fact, there is a greater variety of harmonic patterns in Baroque works called sonatas than in the Classical period. The sonatas of Domenico Scarlatti provide examples of the range of relationships of theme and harmony possible in the 1730s and 1740s.

Sonatas were at first written mainly for the violin. Over time, a formal type evolved, predominating until the late 18th century. This type reached its peak in the sonatas of J.S. Bach, Handel, and Tartini, who followed older Italian models and employed a type attributable to masters such as Corelli and Vivaldi (Musical Form, Leichtentritt, Hugo, p. 122). By the 1730s and 1740s, the direction of instrumental works, often considered less important than vocal music, tended towards an overall two-part layout: the binary form. But a section of contrasting material which served as a bridge between them also came to be included.

== Classical era (ca 1750 – ca 1825) ==
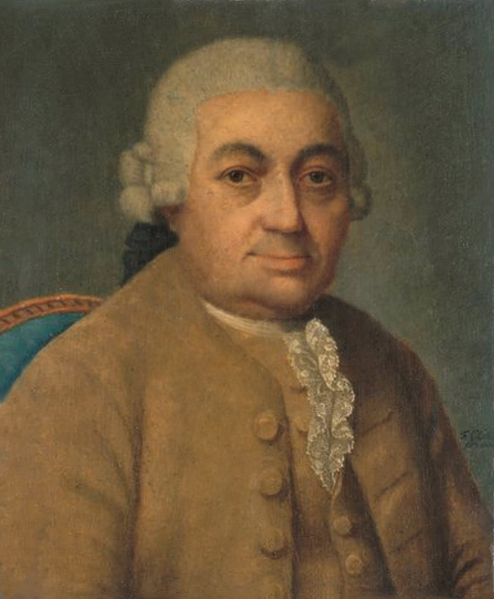
Portrait of composer C.P.E. Bach

The older Italian sonata form differs considerably from the later sonata in the works of the Viennese Classical masters. Between the two main types, the older Italian and the more "modern" Viennese sonata, various transitional types are manifest in the middle of the 18th century, in the works of the Mannheim composers, Johann Stamitz, Franz Xaver Richter, C.P.E. Bach, and many others.

The crucial elements that led to the sonata form were the weakening of the difference between binary and ternary form; the shift of texture away from full polyphony (many voices in imitation) to homophony (a single dominant voice and supporting harmony); and the increasing reliance on juxtaposing different keys and textures. As different key relationships took on a more and more specific meaning, the schematics of works altered. Devices such as the false reprise fell out of favor, while other patterns grew in importance.

Quite probably the most influential composer on the early development of sonata form was C.P.E. Bach, a son of J.S. Bach. Taking the harmonic and voice-leading techniques that his father had developed, he applied them to the homophonic style – allowing dramatic shifts in key and mood, while maintaining an overall coherence. C.P.E. Bach was a decisive influence on Joseph Haydn. One of C.P.E. Bach's most lasting innovations was the shortening of the theme to a motif, which could be shaped more dramatically in pursuit of development. By 1765, C.P.E. Bach's themes, rather than being long melodies, had taken on the style of themes used in sonata form: short, characteristic, and flexible. By linking the changes in the theme to the harmonic function of the section, C.P.E. Bach laid the groundwork that composers such as Haydn and Wolfgang Amadeus Mozart would exploit.

The practice of the great Classical masters, specifically Haydn and Mozart, forms the basis for the description of the sonata form. Their works served both as the model for the form, and as the source for new works conceived in the sonata form itself. Debates about sonata form therefore reference the practice of Haydn and Mozart extensively.

Joseph Haydn is thought of as "the Father of the Symphony" and "the Father of the String Quartet". He can also be thought of as the father of the sonata form as a means of structuring works. His string quartets and symphonies in particular display not merely the range of applications of the form, but also the way to exploit its dramatic potential. It is predominantly Haydn who created the transition to the development and the transition to the recapitulation, as moments of supreme tension and dramatic interest. It is also Haydn who enabled a more expansive contour for works, by making every aspect of the harmony of a work implicit in its main theme. This is no small innovation, in that it creates a homophonic analog to the polyphonic fugue – a seed of potential from which the composer could later germinate a range of different effects. Haydn's variety of dramatic effects and ability to create tension was remarked upon in his own time: his music was increasingly taken as the standard by which other practice might be judged.

Haydn's set of string quartets, Op. 33 gives the first examples of coordinated use of the resources of sonata form in characteristic fashion. The composer himself listed them as being written on completely new principles and marking the turning point in his technique.

Wolfgang Amadeus Mozart applied the large-scale ideas of Haydn to opera and the piano concerto. Mozart's fluidity with the creation of themes, and the dense network of motives and their parts give his work a surface polish which was remarked upon even by his professional rivals. Mozart favored sonata form and the sonata cycle. Most of his compositions were in sonata cycle. He explored every genre of his day and perfected them all. By the end of his short life, Mozart had absorbed Haydn's technique and applied it to his own more elongated sense of theme, for example in the Prague Symphony.

== Romantic period (ca 1800 – ca 1910) ==
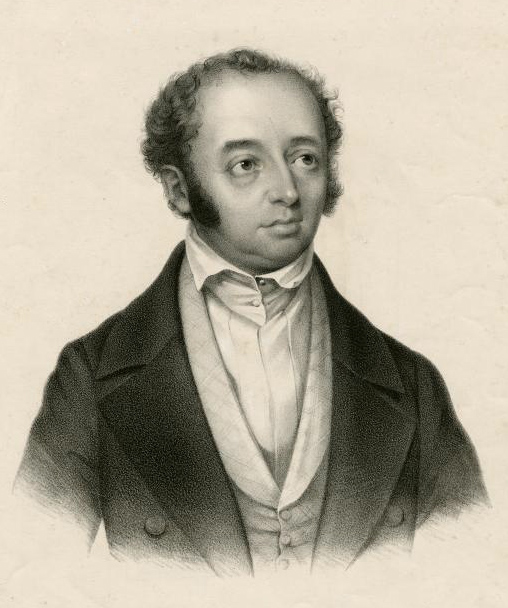
Portrait of music theorist Adolph Bernhard Marx

Ludwig van Beethoven was the composer who most directly inspired the theorists who codified sonata form as a particular practice. While he was grounded in the fluid phrase structures and wider variety of possible schematic layouts that came from Haydn and Mozart, his deepest innovation was to work from both ends of a sonata form, conceiving of the entire structure, and then polishing themes which would support that overarching design. He continued to expand the length and weight of the sonata forms used by Haydn and Mozart, as well as frequently using motives and harmonic models drawn from the two older composers. He shares both the Classical and Romantic eras. Because of his use of increasingly characteristic rhythms and disruptive devices, he is seen as a transitional figure between the Classical and Romantic periods.

In the Romantic era, sonata form was first explicitly defined and became institutionalized. Academic scholars like Adolph Bernhard Marx wrote descriptions of the form, often with a normative goal; that is, a goal of stating how works in sonata form should be composed. While the first-movement form had been the subject of theoretical works, it was seen as the pinnacle of musical technique. Part of the training of 19th-century composers was to write in sonata form and to favor sonata form in the first movement of multi-movement compositions, like symphonies, piano concertos, and string quartets.

The 19th century's procedure for writing sonatas diverged from earlier Classical practice, in that it focused more on themes than on the placement of cadences. The monothematic exposition (a common characteristic of Haydn's sonata-form movements) largely disappeared, and the themes of the first and second groups were expected to contrast in character. More generally, the formal outline of a sonata came to be viewed more in terms of its themes or groups of themes, rather than the sharp differentiation of tonal areas based on cadences. In the Classical period, establishing the expectation of a particular cadence and then delaying or avoiding it was a common way of creating tension. In the 19th century, with its dramatically expanded harmonic vocabulary, avoidance of a cadence did not have the same degree of unexpectedness. Instead, more distant key regions were established by a variety of other means, including use of increasingly dissonant chords, pedal points, texture, and alteration of the main theme itself.

In the Classical period, the contrast between theme groups, while useful, was not required. The first theme group tended to outline the tonic chord, and the second theme tended to be more cantabile in character. But this was far from universal – as Haydn's monothematic expositions and Beethoven's early rhythmic themes show. Because the power of harmonic opposition, both between tonic and dominant and between major and minor, had less force in the Romantic vocabulary, stereotypes of the character of themes became stronger. Nineteenth-century theorists described the sonata principle as one of opposition between two groups of themes. Thus, it was thought by Marx that the first theme should be "masculine" – strident, rhythmic, and implying a dissonance – and the second theme group should be drawn more from vocal melody making it "feminine". It is this contrast between "rhythmic" and "singing" that Wagner, in his very influential work On Conducting, argued was at the very core of tension in music. That texture, as Wagner argued, is the most important contrast and that tempo should be used to emphasize this contrast. Thus, fast sections were conducted faster and slow sections were conducted slower.

By requiring that harmony move with the themes, 19th-century sonata form imposed a kind of discipline on composers and also allowed audiences to comprehend the music by following the appearance of recognizable melodies. However, the sonata form, as an inherited formal mold, also created a tension for Romantic composers between the desire to combine poetical expression and academic rigor.

Later Romantic commentators and theorists detected a "sonata idea" of increasing formalization. They drew a progression of works from Haydn, through Mozart and Beethoven, whereby more and more movements in a multi-movement work were felt to be in sonata form. These theorists present the theory that originally only first movements were in that form, then later last movements as well (for example Mozart's Prague Symphony), and eventually the "sonata principle" came to extend through an entire work. For example, Beethoven's String Quartet Op. 59 No. 2 was said to have all four movements in sonata form. By this, theorists such as Donald Tovey meant the academically laid-out sonata form. Charles Rosen has argued that, properly understood, this was always the case: that real sonata forms (plural) were always present, though this is not universally agreed on.

As the 19th century progressed, the complexity of sonata form grew, as new ways of moving through the harmony of a work were introduced by Johannes Brahms and Franz Liszt. Instead of focusing exclusively on keys closely related in the circle of fifths, they used movement along circles based on minor or major triads. Following the trend established by Beethoven, the focus moved more and more to the development section. This was in line with the Romantic comparison of music to poetry. Poetic terms, such as "rhapsody" and "tone poem", entered music, and increasingly musicians felt that they should not take the repeats in symphonies because there was no dramatic or lyrical point to doing so. This changed their interpretation of previous sonata forms.

The Romantic sonata form was an especially congenial mold for Brahms, who felt a strong affinity with the composers of the Classical era. Brahms adopted and extended Beethoven's practice of modulating to more remote keys in the exposition, combining this with the use of counterpoint in the inner voices. For example, his piano quintet has the first subject in F minor, but the second subject is in C sharp minor, an augmented fifth higher. In the same work, the key scheme of the recapitulation is also altered – the second subject in the recapitulation is in F sharp minor, rather than the F minor of the first subject.

Another force acting on sonata form was the school of composers centering on Franz Liszt and Richard Wagner. They sought to integrate more roving harmonies and unprepared chords into the musical structure in order to attain both formal coherence and a full, expressive range of keys. Increasingly, themes began to have notes which were far from the original key, a procedure later labeled "extended tonality". This trend strongly influenced the next generation of composers, for instance Gustav Mahler. The first movements of several of his symphonies are described as being in sonata form, although they diverge from the standard scheme quite dramatically. Some have even argued that the entirety of his first symphony (in which material from the first movement returns in the fourth movement) is meant to be one massive sonata-allegro form.

As the result of these innovations, works became more sectional. Composers such as Liszt and Anton Bruckner even began to include explicit pauses in works between sections. The length of sonata movements grew starting in the 1830s. Franz Lachner 's Prize Symphony, a work seldom played today, had a first movement longer than any symphonic first movement by Beethoven. The length of whole works also increased correspondingly. Tone poems, which were often in sonata form, greatly extended their length in comparison to traditional overtures. For instance, Berlioz's Waverley Overture is as long as some middle-period Haydn symphonies.

One debate in the 19th century was over whether it was acceptable to use the layout of a poem or other literary work to structure a work of instrumental music. The compositional school focused around Liszt and Wagner (the so-called New German School) argued in favor of literary inspiration (see Program music), while another camp, centered on Schumann, Brahms, and Eduard Hanslick argued that pure music should follow the forms laid out by Haydn, Mozart, and Beethoven. This conflict was eventually internalized, and by 1900, though the debate still raged, composers such as Richard Strauss would freely combine programmatic and symphonic structure, such as in the work Ein Heldenleben.

== Modern era ==
In the Modern period, sonata form became detached from its traditional harmonic basis. The works of Schoenberg, Debussy, Sibelius and Richard Strauss emphasized different scales other than the traditional major-minor scale and used chords that did not clearly establish tonality. It could be argued that by the 1930s, sonata form was merely a rhetorical term for any movement that stated themes, took them apart, and put them back together again. However, even composers of atonal music, such as Roger Sessions and Karl Hartmann, continued to use outlines that clearly pointed back to the practice of Beethoven and Haydn, even if the method and style were quite different. At the same time, composers such as Sergei Prokofiev, Benjamin Britten, and Dmitri Shostakovich revived the idea of a sonata form by more complex and extended use of tonality.

In more recent times, Minimalism has searched for new ways to develop form, and new outlines which, again, while not being based on the same harmonic plan as the Classical sonata, are clearly related to it. An example is Aaron Jay Kernis's Symphony in Waves from the early 1990s.
