= Anthony Marwood =

English classical violinist

Anthony Marwood MBE
- Born: Anthony Marwood; Blackheath, London, United Kingdom
- Occupation: Violinist
- Years active: 1987–present

Anthony Marwood is a British solo violinist.

== Career ==
Marwood studied at the Royal Academy of Music and the Guildhall School of Music and Drama. His teachers included Emanuel Hurwitz and David Takeno. From 1995 to 2012, Marwood was a member of the Florestan Trio with Susan Tomes and Richard Lester. He was Artistic Director of the Irish Chamber Orchestra from 2006 to 2011. He was Principal Artistic Partner with Les Violons du Roy from 2015 to 2019, and Artist in Residence at the Det Norske Kammerorkester in 2016/17. In the summer of 2021 Marwood performed the Ligeti Violin Concerto in the Koussevitsky Shed at Tanglewood Music Festival under the baton of Thomas Adès.

Marwood has performed contemporary violin concertos by Samuel Adams, Sally Beamish, and Steven Mackey. Thomas Adès composed his violin concerto "Concentric Paths" for Marwood. He has recorded commercially over 50 CD recordings for such labels as Hyperion and EMI Classics.
