= Piano Trio No. 4 (Mozart) =

1788 composition by W. A. Mozart

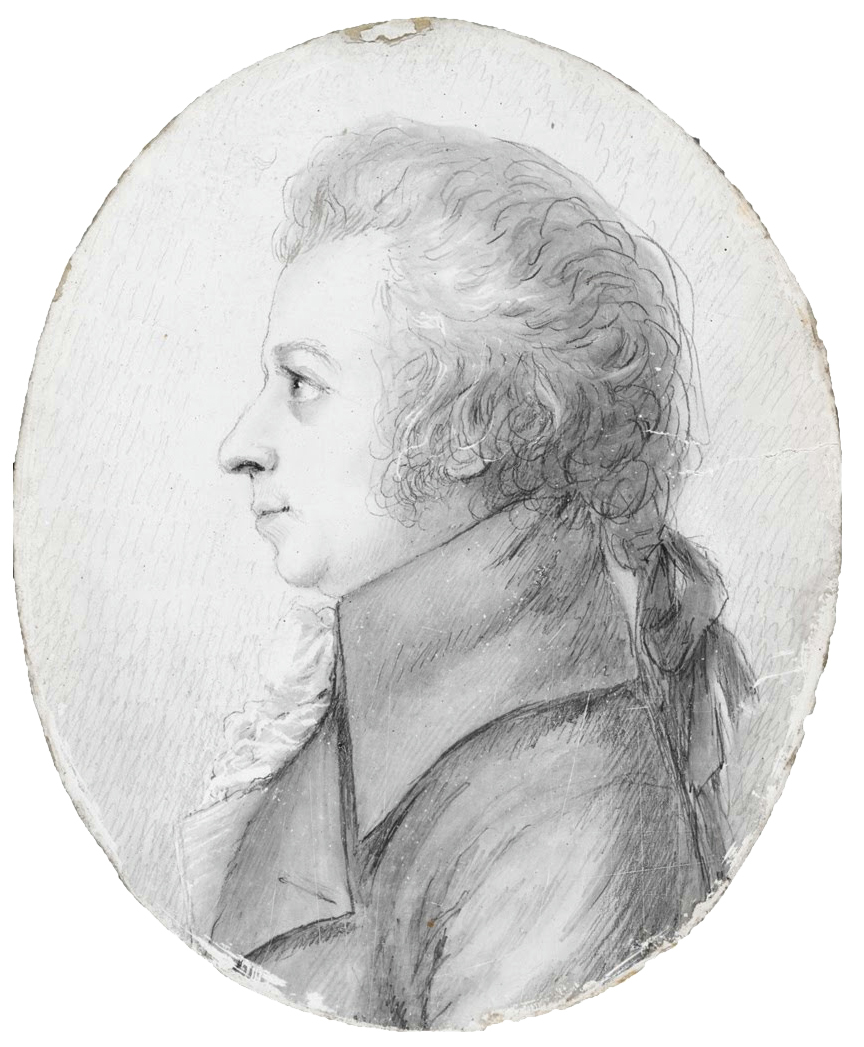
Stock's 1789 miniature of Mozart

The Piano Trio No. 4 in E major, K. 542, was written by Wolfgang Amadeus Mozart in 1788. It is scored for piano, violin and cello. It's the only multi-movement composition by Mozart in the key of E major.

Rachel Beckles Willson, writing in the Cambridge Mozart Encyclopedia, points out that "Mozart almost certainly played all the piano parts himself, however, and made no concessions for dilettantes: the pieces demand a high level of technical and musical ability. For this reason too, the trios stand out among contemporary works for the same genre." Simon P Keefe notes that the piano trio, like other piano trios and quartets of this period, 'freely integrates dialogue and piano passagework ... thus integrating the prevalent features of the string quartets and piano concertos. It has, he says, ' all the hallmarks of Mozart's revered late style'

This trio was played by Frédéric Chopin in his last recital on 16 February 1848 in Paris, together with violinist Jean-Delphin Alard and cellist Auguste Franchomme.

== Movements ==
This piano trio is in three movements:

1. Allegro (in 3/4)
2. Andante grazioso (in A major, 2/4)
3. Allegro (in cut time)

Beckles Willson comments that "the mellifluous nature of the first movement's opening piano theme and the unusually detailed and intricate shades of dynamics marked in the score, including the marking of 'dolce' to the second theme, both provide chamber-like intimacy. The first presentation of the second movement's stately theme is in the piano alone; in the second presentation the cello and the violin surround the piano. The cello's provision of the bass-line in bar 13 in particular is a potent registral and harmonic features of the altered theme."
