= Wu Qian (pianist) =

Chinese pianist

Wu Qian 吴倩
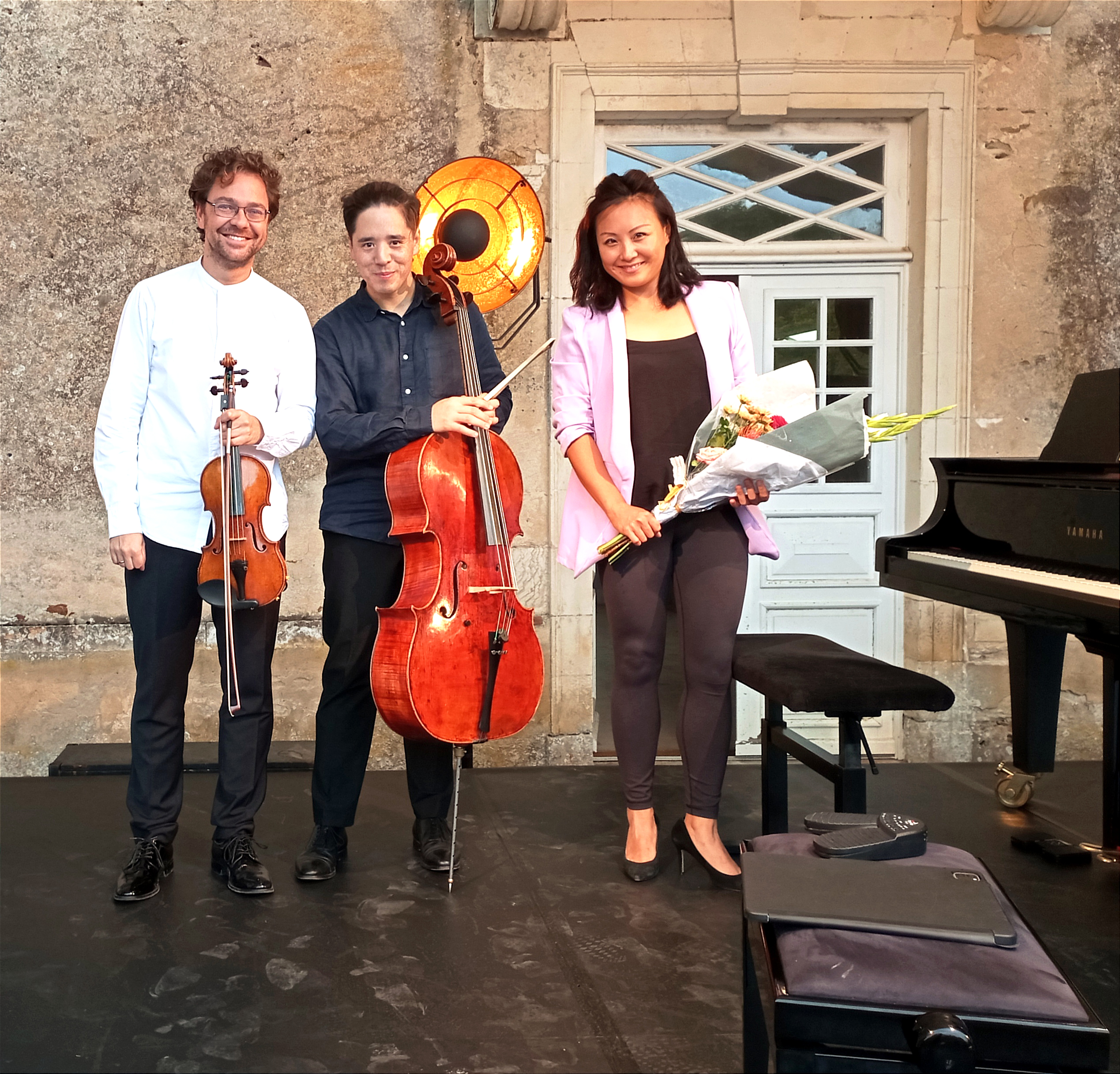
- Sitkovetsky Trio in 2023, Wu Qian on the right

Background information
- Born: January 26, 1984 (age 42); Shanghai, China
- Genres: Classical
- Occupation: Pianist
- Instrument: Piano
- Member of: Sitkovetsky Trio

Wu Qian (Chinese: 吴倩; born January 26, 1984) is a Chinese classical pianist.

== Life ==
Wu Qian was born in Shanghai, China. She began piano studies from the age of six progressing to enrollment in the Shanghai Conservatory of Music aged nine. At the age of thirteen she was invited on a full scholarship to study at the Yehudi Menuhin School with Irina Zaritskaya, and then went on to study with Arnaldo Cohen and Christopher Elton at the Royal Academy of Music, London.

At the age of fifteen, Qian performed a Mozart piano concerto in the Queen Elizabeth Hall, London and later at the Menuhin Festival in Gstaad, Switzerland. As the recipient of the Sydney Perry Award from the Martin Musical Foundation, Qian performed the Saint-Saëns Piano Concerto No. 2 with the Philharmonia Orchestra in St John's, Smith Square, London in 2000. In 2001, she played a recital at the Purcell Room where her ambitious programme included Elliott Carter's Night Fantasies, two György Ligeti Études and Hafliði Hallgrímsson's Homage to Mondrian. Broadcast on BBC Radio 3, this recital drew enthusiastic reviews from five national newspapers. Qian has given recitals in the Wigmore Hall, Royal Festival Hall London, the Bridgewater Hall in Manchester, the City Hall, Hong Kong, in Hanover and Amsterdam and in the Steinway Hall of Hamburg and New York City where her performance was recorded by Japanese National Television NHK for broadcast throughout Asia.

In December 2006, she was selected by the Independent Newspaper as a rising star for 2007. In October 2009, Qian represented China in the Europalia festival performing Frédéric Chopin's Piano Concerto No. 2 with the Brussels Philharmonic in a tour of Belgium under Carlos Kalmar.

She is part of the Sitkovetsky Trio.

== Recording ==
Wu Qian's critically acclaimed debut recording of works by Robert Schumann, Franz Liszt and the young composer Alexander Prior was released in 2009 on the Dal Segno label.
