= Piano Trio No. 6 (Mozart) =

Piano trio by Wolfgang Amadeus Mozart

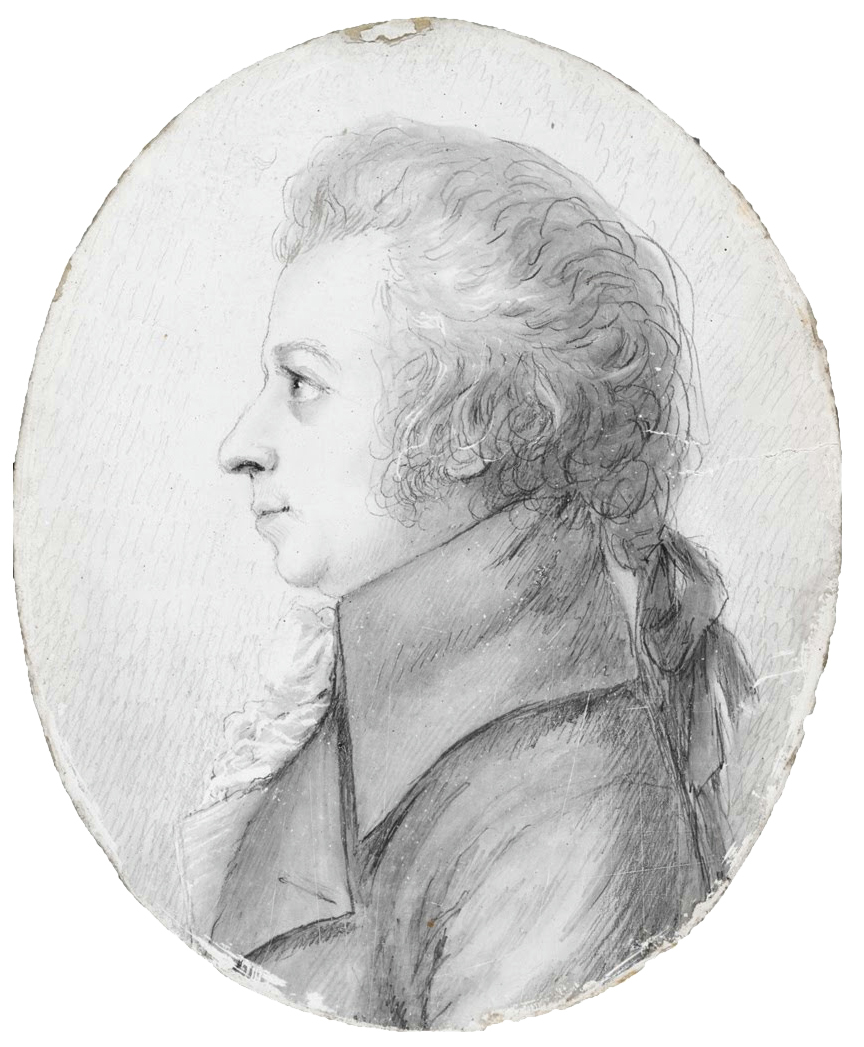
Stock's 1789 miniature of Mozart

The Piano Trio No. 6 in G major, K. 564, was written by Wolfgang Amadeus Mozart in 1788 and is part of his series of piano trios. It is scored for piano, violin and cello.

== Movements ==
The work is in three movement form:

1. Allegro
2. Andante in C major (theme & 6 variations)
3. Allegretto
