= Piano Trio No. 2 (Mozart) =

1786 piano trio by Wolfgang Amadeus Mozart

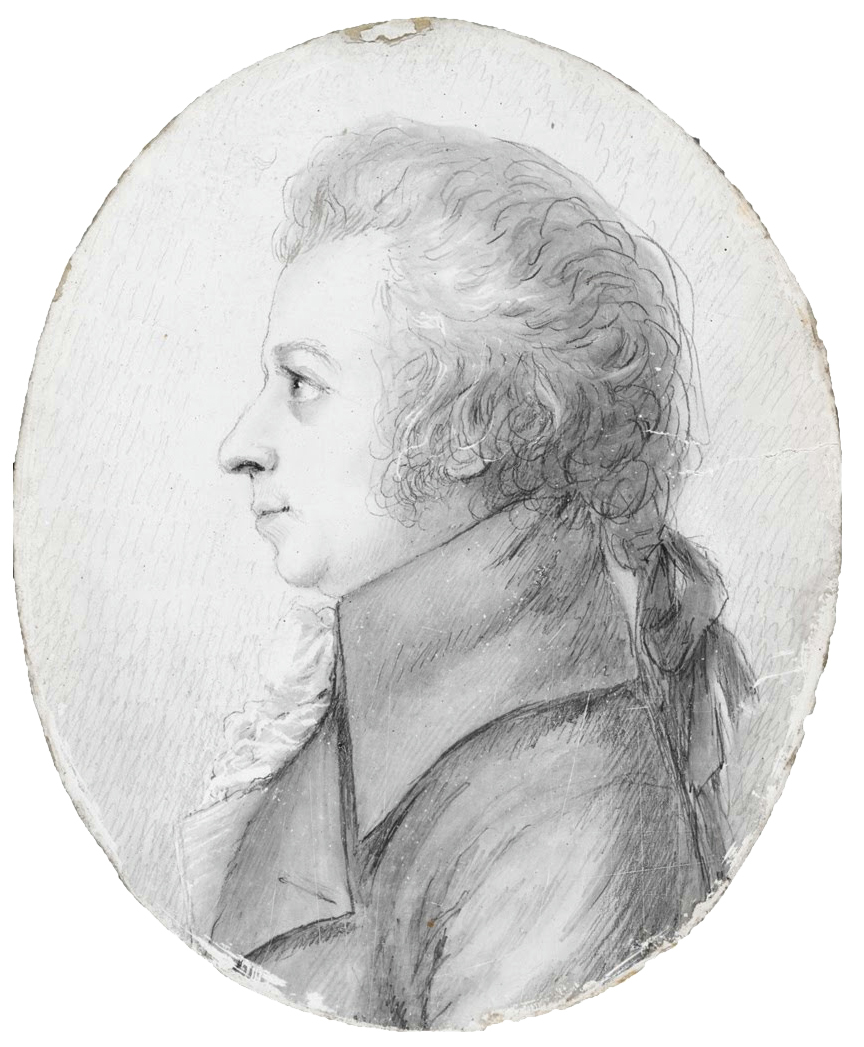
Stock's 1789 miniature of Mozart

The Piano Trio No. 2 in G major, K. 496, was written by Wolfgang Amadeus Mozart in 1786. It is scored for piano, violin and cello.

Johann Anton André arranged this piano trio as Clarinet Quartet, Op. 79, No. 3 (nos 1 and 2 are arrangements of Violin Sonata No. 26 in B♭, K. 378, Violin Sonata No. 28 in E♭, K. 380)

== Movements ==
The work is in three movement form:

1. Allegro
2. Andante in C major
3. Allegretto
