= Alexander Sitkovetsky =

British violinist (born 1983)

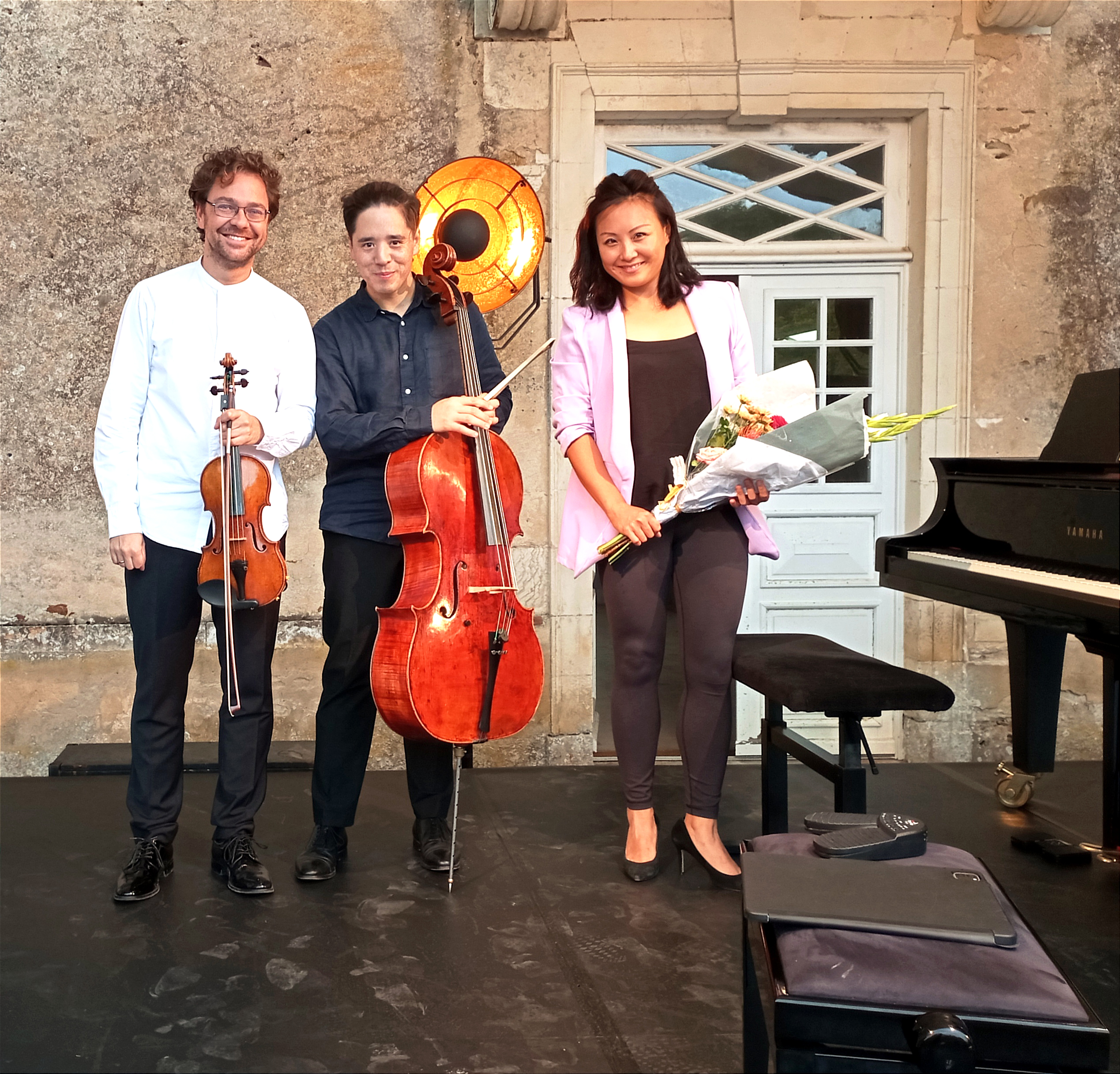
Sitkovetsky Trio in 2023, Alexander on the left

Alexander Sitkovetsky (born 1983) is a British violinist.

== Biography ==
Sitkovetsky was born in Moscow to a musical family. His father being guitarist and composer Alexander Sitkovetsky of the Autograph fame, his mother Olga Sitkovetsky being a pianist. He is the nephew of violinist Dmitry Sitkovetsky.

Sitkovetsky emigrated from Russia at the age of six and has lived in England since 1991. At age eight he appeared as a soloist in Montpellier, and he was subsequently invited to enroll at the Yehudi Menuhin School. He studied there with Natalya Boyarskaya and Hu Kun. Sitkovetsky subsequently went on to study under Pavel Vernikov in Vienna.

Sitkovetsky performs as a soloist around the world and also records. He is part of the Sitkovetsky Trio.

In season 2024/2024 Sitkovetsky became artistic director of the NFM Leopoldinum Orchestra.
