= Piano Trio No. 1 (Mozart) =

1776 piano trio by Wolfgang Amadeus Mozart

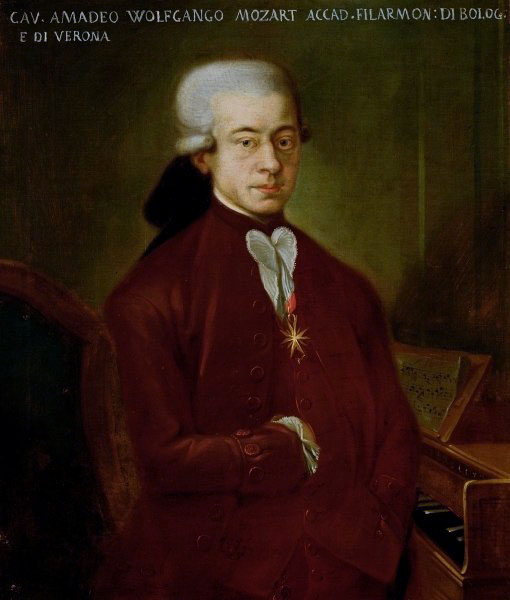
1777 portrait of Mozart

The Piano Trio No. 1 in B♭ major, K. 254, was written by Wolfgang Amadeus Mozart in 1776. It is scored for piano, violin and cello. Rachel Beckles Willson writes that it may have been inspired by Johann Christian Bach's harpsichord sonatas with accompanying violin and cello which Mozart heard in London in 1764. It is not known what occasion it was written for. The only record of a performance comes from one of Mozart's letters in which he reports performing it in a concert in Munich in 1777 on his journey to Paris. Although Mozart's autograph gives the work's title as a divertimento, in one of his letters he refers to it as Trio für Klavier ex B (piano trio in B-flat), and Kraus points out that the form and character have more in common with the trio than the divertimento. The editors of the Neue Mozart-Ausgabe place the work somewhere between the genres of piano trio and divertimento. "Seen from the standpoint of the late Mozart piano trio, it must be seen as a precursory form in every way, with very little real independence in the violoncello part... an extremely borderline case in which the first signs of a turn towards the piano trio in its classical dimensions are already clearly manifest."

== Movements ==
The work is in three movements:

1. Allegro assai
2. Adagio in E♭ major
3. Rondo. Tempo di menuetto

The violin part provides significant melodic and textural material independent of the piano part, but the cello, as was usual in piano trios of the period, largely follows the piano's left-hand part. However, Gottfried Kraus points out that with the pianos of Mozart's time, whose bass register was much quieter than modern pianos, the effect is not one of the cello doubling the piano but rather of the piano adding a touch of colour to the cello's bass line.
