= Florestan Trio =

The Florestan Trio was a piano trio. Formed in 1995 in London, England, its members were Anthony Marwood (violin), Richard Lester (cello), and Susan Tomes (piano). Their recording of the first two trios by Schumann won the 1999 Gramophone Award for chamber music. Also in 1999, the Trio received the Music Award for Chamber Ensemble from Britain’s Royal Philharmonic Society. On 13 June 2009 they performed Beethoven's Symphony No. 2 in D major in a rarely heard arrangement by the composer for piano trio. The Florestan Trio recorded extensively for the Hyperion label. Their final series of concerts was given at the Wigmore Hall in London in January 2012.
