= Piano Trio No. 5 (Mozart) =

1788 composition by W. A. Mozart

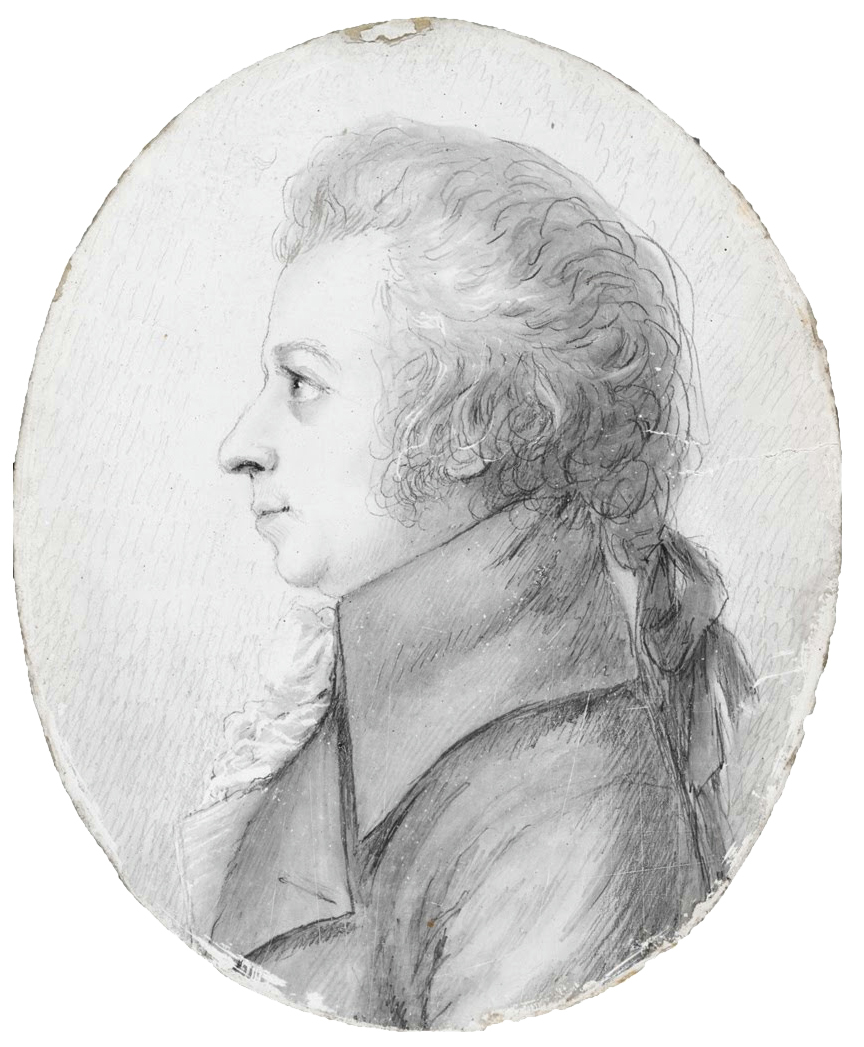
Stock's 1789 miniature of Mozart

The Piano Trio No. 5 in C major, K. 548, was written by Wolfgang Amadeus Mozart in July 1788. It is scored for piano, violin and cello.

== Movements ==
The work is in three movement form:

1. Allegro
2. Andante cantabile (in F major)
3. Allegro
