= Kakadu =

Kakadu is the German word for cockatoo

Kakadu may refer to:

== Places ==
=== Australia ===
- Kakadu National Park, a protected area
- Kakadu Highway, a highway in the Northern Territory
- Kakadu, Northern Territory, a locality

== Plants and animals ==
=== Australia ===
- Kakadu dunnart, a species of dunnart
- Kakadu pebble-mound mouse, a species of rodent
- Kakadu plum, a species of flowering plant
- Kakadu woolly-butt, a species of tree
- Kakadu sand goanna, a species of monitor lizard
- Kakadu vicetail, a species of dragonfly

== Arts and entertainment ==
- Kakadu Variations, by Ludwig van Beethoven
- Kakadu und Kiebitz, a 1920 German silent film
- Kakadu (Sculthorpe), an orchestral composition by Peter Sculthorpe

== Other ==
- Kakadu language, an extinct Australian Aboriginal language
- Kakadu (people), an Australian Aboriginal people
- Kakadu (sailplane), a large sailplane built in 1928 by Julius Hatry
- Kakadu (software), a software library for encoding and decoding JPEG 2000 images
- Kakadu Storm, a rugby team in the Darwin Rugby League
