= Universel Murad Hassil =

Sufi place of worship in the Netherlands

Coordinates: 52.1936°N 4.3886°E

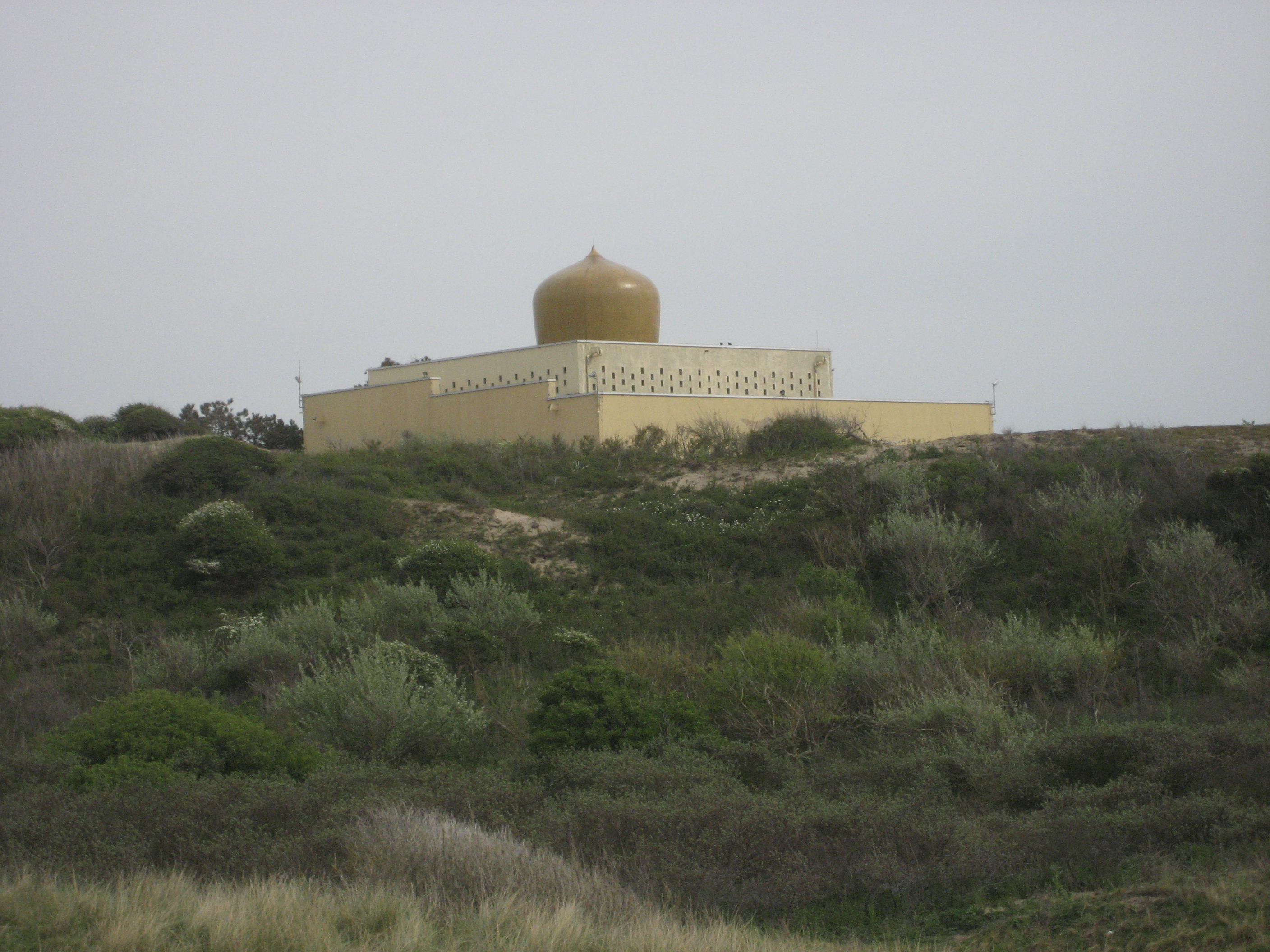
Universel Murad Hassil in Katwijk

The Universel Murad Hassil is an international Universal Sufi place of worship known as a "Universel" located in Katwijk aan Zee in the Netherlands. Its associated amphitheatre situated in the dunes has frequently been used as a public exhibition space and is a cultural attraction for the local municipality.

== History ==
In 1969, a structure designed by the Dutch architect S. J. van Embden was built on the place where, in the summer of 1922, Inayat Khan reported having a 'spiritual experience' and proclaimed the place holy.

The land was bought by the municipality of Katwijk from the State of the Netherlands in 1947. The lot is distinct from the territory of the Dutch armed forces bought by the municipality in 1954. The Murad Hassil trust acquired a perpetual lease from the municipality in 1956 through the Council of State. A building permit was granted by the municipality on 25 juli 1967.

Work on the building was announced in January 1968, and commenced in April 1969. The official opening was Saturday July 4, 1970.

The temple was built by construction company Van Rhijn Katwijk, which was in financial difficulties at the time. New employees were hired for the realisation of the project, which cost about ƒ500,000.

The building is a simple square, with a golden cupola dome rising rises 10 metres (33 ft) above the rest of the structure. The construction used concrete blocks and glass bricks, with the cupola made of double-walled transparent plastic.

In 1984 the Royal Dutch Touring Club and Tourism Society deemed the temple an attractive "place of interest", and the building was included in the architecture guide of Rijnland region published by the Dutch Association of Architectural Firms. In 2009 a quartets card game was published with one card featuring the building. There is also an associated amphitheatre for 335 people located nearby in a dune valley.

In 2014 the building was nominated for monument status by the municipal heritage committee. It has been open to the public on European Heritage Days.

As of September 2023 the building is part of a project called 'The Largest Museum of the Netherlands'.

== Usage ==
Every year, the 'Sufi summer school' takes place in this temple, and many Universal Sufis from around the world visit the temple each summer.

There were plans to build accommodation to stay overnight for participants; however, in 1987 the majority of the local council for spatial planning was against extension of the complex.

=== Public events ===
The Universal Worship Service, brotherhood days and other meetings take place in the temple as well as several traditional music concerts. These are open to the general public.

==== Exhibition space ====
The temple has been used as a public exhibition space.

Exhibitions
Opening date	Closing date	Name
1977-04-02	1977-04-03	Artist collective "'t Pandje" Katwijk
1977-07-09	1977-08-14	Exhibition "Islamathematica" by Keith Albarn et al.
	1984-11-03	Paintings and drawings by Yamuna Bos, Fien Coleman-Breeuwsma and Coen van den Ende

==== Stage ====
The policy of the Public Benefit Organisation responsible for the temple states the temple can be made available to others for activities only if those activities are harmonious with the spiritual atmosphere of the temple.

Performances
Date	Description	Artist
1971-06-16	Recital. Works by Heitor Villa-Lobos et al.	José Leal (piano)
1971-06-30	Audio performance	Western and eastern meditative music
1971-07-14	Audio performance	Mozarts opera "Die Zauberflöte"
1971-08-01	Concert	Lenora Lafayette (soprano)
1974-10-29	Kamermuziek	Lize Schoo (soprano), Truus van Dongen (alt) et al.
1976-04-28	Concert	Henry Blackmon (bariton), Koos Bons (piano), Gert van der Endt (flute)
1976-08-06	Puppetry	Marionet and puppet theatre Triangel of Ans and Henk Boerwinkel
1976-08-13	Indian music	Darshan Kumari (sitar)
1976-08-15	Concert	Trio Klassiek: Froukje Wiebenga (flute), Willie de Wilde (piano) and Yke Viersen (cello)
1976-08-17	Jazz music	Sandro Zonca (alt and tenor saxophone), Cyohn Reinhart (trumpet), Melody Reinhart (tanpura), Malik Lechelt (piano, percussion)
1976-08-28	Popular and classical music	Thijs van Leer
1976-09-04	Concert	Trio Thijs van Leer
1976-09-11	Concert	Quartetto Esterházy (strings): Jaap Schröder (violin), Alda Stuurop (violin), Wiel Peeters (viola), Wouter Möller (cello)
1976-10-09	Concert	Randy Weston
1976-10-22	Concert	Daniël Otten and Johan Otten
1977-02-25	Concert	Christiaan Bor and Marja Bon
1977-06-18	All night programme "A Midsummer Night's Dream"	Leids Kamerkoor, Barokensemble, Jamal-Ud-Din-Bharatiya et al.
1977-09-24	Concert	Horn trio: Vicente Zarzo (horn), Jaring Walta (violin), and Jan van der Meer (piano)
1977-11-18	Concert	Trio Rien de Reede
1978-01-06	Recital	Aafje Heynis
1978-06-24	Jazz concert	John Tchicai (saxophone)
1978-07-02	African Polyrhythm	Percussiongroup Tenebos
1978-07-07	Frank Martin honoured	Irwin Gage (piano), Meinard Kraak (tenor), Wouter Möller (cello), Lode Devos (dance) and Theresa Martin (dance)
1978-10-26	Scottish ballads and folk songs	Caroline van Hemert
1979-02-09	Concert	Emmy Verhey (violin) and Carlos Moerdijk (piano)
1979-03-23	Festival	Pajtás Gypsy Orchestra under the direction of Michaël Mantz (cimbalom)
1979-03-02	Concert	Han de Vries and Rudolf Jansen
1979-10-26	Concert	Mark Lubotsky, Danièle Dechenne
1980-04-10	Concert	Belgisch Variatie Ensemble: Guy van der Borght (clarinet), Marcel Hanssens (clarinet), Carl Verbraecken (piano) and Marcel van der Borght (drums)
1980-11-14	Concert	Gerard Hengeveld
1981-11-27	Concert. Works by Henri Marteau, Joseph Jongen et al.	Members of the Residentie Orchestra
1982-03-19	Concert	Yke Viersen (cello) and Jet Röling (piano)
1982-12-10	Flute-harp duo	Abbie de Quant (flute) and Edward Witsenburg (harp)
1983-01-07	Pianoconcert	Jenny Zaharieva
1983-04-16	Concert	Mendelssohn Trio: Lex Korff de Gidts (violin), Elias Arizcuren (cello), Alwin Bär (piano)
1984-04-27	Concert	The Netherlands Guitar Trio: Wim Spruijt, Dick Hoogeveen and Henk Westhiner
1995-11-11	Pianoconcert	Jenny Zaharieva
1996-08-25	Musical and cultural programme	Dutch Shakuhachi Society 'Kaito'
1997-01-10	Guitar concert	Groningen Guitar Duo: Eric Vaarzon Morel et al.
1998-02-05	Concert op harp en fluit	Godelieve Schrama (harp) and Marieke Schneemann (flute)
1998-03-14	Concert	Nederlands Gitaarduo: Juun Voorhoeve en Erik Otte
1998-11-01	Flamenco concert	Eric Vaarzon Morel, Ricardo Mendeville
1998-11-21	Klassiek concert	Mitsuko Saruwatari and Kaoru Kakudo
1998-12-12	Candlelight concert	Follia Duo
1999-01-16	Klassiek concert	Anke Anderson (harp) and Mariette Gort (cello)
2002-01-26	Concert	Duo Volante: Daan van der Vliet (guitar) and Hanneke Ramselaar (oboe)
2002-03-02	Concert	Lycoris Trio: Nienke Oostenrijk (soprano), Pauline Oostenrijk (oboe), Manja Smits (harp)
2003-11-01	Concert	Ensemble Contours: Stepan Pas (dirigent), Barbara Tetenberg (soprano soloist) et al.
2004-11-13	Concert Maannacht. Works by Hans Riphagen et al.	Ensemble Contours: Stepan Pas (dirigent), Karin van Arkel (soprano soloist) et al.
2011-09-24	Concert	Emmy Storms (violin solo), De Haagse Beek (string orchestra), Yiorgo Moutsiaras (conductor)
2011-10-15	Duorecital	Paolo Giacometti (piano) and Rosanne Philippens
2011-11-19	Flamenco-gitaar	André van der Zijden
2012-01-14	Classical concert	MirAnDa Trio: Mirjam Rietberg (harp), Anna Azernikova (soprano) and Dasha Beltiukova (flute)
2012-03-17	Poetry and music combined	Anna Enquist (poet) and Ivo Janssen (piano)
2012-11-03	Music theatre	Caroline Erkelens
2013-01-19	Concert	Claudio Constantini (piano)
2013-02-09	Flute-harp duo. Works by Ned McGowan et al.	Fluitharp Duo: Vera Kool (harp) and Egbert Jan Louwerse (flute)
2013-03-16	Concert	Pieter Wispelwey (cello)
2013-09-28	Concert	Emmy Verhey (violin) and Paul Komen (piano)
2013-11-17	North Indian classical music	Christophe Bonnafous (bansuri), Ted de Jong (tabla) et al.
2014-01-11	Concert	Remy van Kesteren (harp)
2014-03-01	Music theatre	Klaas Hofstra
2014-03-29	Chambermusic	Trio Suleika: Maurice Lammerts van Bueren (piano), Emmy Storms (violin) and Pepijn Meeuws (cello)
2014-09-27	Chambermusic	Trio Tangata: Jacqueline Edeling (bandoneon), Margreet Markering (piano), Suze Stiphout (contrabas) et al.
2014-12-17	Şeb-i Arus programme	Islamitische Stichting Nederland, Mustafa Ünver, Abdulwahid van Bommel, Tevazu Sufi Music Ensemble et al.
2015-01-24	Chambermusic	Vesko Eschkenazy (violin) and Marietta Petkova (piano)
2015-04-18	Indian dhrupad concert	Marianne Svašek (voice, tanpura) and Nathanaël van Zuilen (pakhavaj)
2015-10-10	Italian film music	Lumayna: Hans Elzinga (guitars), Marcella Pischedda (guitar and voice), Rob Musters (clarinet)
2015-11-21	Pianoconcert	Arielle Vernède
2016-01-23	Concert	Musical trio
2016-04-23	Indian music	Martijn Baaijens (sarod) and Ganesh Ramnath (tabla)
2016-04-29	Sephardic songs	Marya Beetstra
2016-09-24	Classical concert	Tosca Opdam (violin) and Helena Basilova (piano)
2016-10-15	String quartet	Dudok Quartet: Judith van Driel (violin), Marleen Wester (violin), Mark Mulder (viola) and David Faber (cello)
2016-11-19	Music theatre	Regina Albrink and Klaas Hofstra
2017-01-14	Concert	Larissa Groeneveld (cello) and Lars Wouters van den Oudenweijer (clarinet)
2017-02-11	Concert	Anke Bottema (harp), Mariette Gort (cello), Joep van Beijnum (violin) and Duco Burgers (piano)
2017-03-11	Classical music	Jeroen van Veen (piano)
2017-09-30	Classical concert	Van Amsterdam Duo
2017-10-29	Indian classical music	Lenneke van Staalen (Indian violin) and Heiko Dijker (tabla) of the Dutch Strings Guild
2017-12-01	PeaceConcert	Elie Saz
2017-12-02	Concert	Chimaera Trio: Annemiek de Bruin (clarinet), Irene Kok (cello) and Laurens de Man (piano)
2018-03-03	PeaceConcert	Maya Fridman
2018-04-28	PeaceConcert	Yourie Castricum
2018-05-19	PeaceConcert	Avi Adir
2018-10-06	Classical concert	Van Swieten Society: Bart van Oort (fortepiano), Heleen Hulst (violin), Sara DeCorso (violin), Bernadette Verhagen (viola) and Diederik van Dijk (cello)
2018-11-03	Classical concert	Trio 42: Merel Vercammen (violin), Anneleen Schuitemaker (harp) and Juan Manuel Domínguez (saxophone)
2018-12-01	Concert	Magma Duo: Cynthia Liem (piano) and Emmy Storms (violin)
2019-01-26	Music theatre	Kees Scholten (voice), Margreet Markering (piano) and Emmy Storms (violin)
2019-02-16	Piano duet à quatre mains	Marc van der Marel and Marquis Bieshaar
2019-02-23	PeaceConcert	Renske Skills
2019-09-14	Chansons	Oukje den Hollander (voice), Vera Marijt (piano) and Marijn Korff de Gidts (i.a. percussion)
2019-10-05	Concert	The Hague String Trio: Pauline Oostenrijk (oboe), Justyna Briefjes (violin), Julia Dinerstein (viola) and Miriam Kirby (cello)
2019-11-16	Music theatre	Mike Boddé (piano, voice), Merel Vercammen (violin, vibrandoneon-melodica) and Sterre Konijn (soprano, voice, duduk)
2020-01-25	Concert	Tango Por Dos: Anna van Nieukerken (piano) and Jacqueline van der Zwan (flute)

Lectures
Date	Description	Lecturer
2014-11-30	Inspiration day: Christian mystics and meditation	Nico Tydeman
2015-03-29	Inspiration day: Thomas Merton	Predikant dr. K. Bras
2015-10-11	Inspiration day	Jan Bor

==== Other public activities ====
Workshops
Date	Description	Instructor
2015-10-11	Ink wash painting	Beppe Mokuza

== Interactions ==
=== Local community ===
In connection with vandalism in 1987 permission was obtained to build a guard house on the premises.

In 1988 a member of the local city council spoke out against the colour of the outer walls of the temple. In 1989 the originally sober concrete brick walls were covered with a layer of plaster in various pastel colours.

=== Religious groups ===
In Katwijk there are predominantly Dutch Reformed Churches. In 1969 local Dutch Reformed conversation circles discussed the appearance of the Sufi place of worship. At the opening of the temple in 1970 the praeses and secretary of the synods of the Dutch Reformed Churches (NHK) and the Reformed Churches in the Netherlands (GKN) were invited.

=== Environment ===
For the disposal of waste a connection has been made to a conduit especially made for the purpose.

According to a study by the province of Zuid-Holland the location of the Universel does not overlap with the location of habitat types or habitats with a conservation objective.
