= Trio for horn, violin, and piano =

Trio for horn, violin, and piano may refer to:

- Trio for horn, violin, and piano (Banks)
- Trio for horn, violin, and piano (Berkeley)
