= Horn trio =

Horn trio can mean a work written for three natural horns or French horns as well as one for horn and two other instruments. In the latter category, an important genre is the trio for horn, violin and piano. Although there are a few earlier examples, the tradition of this scoring was inaugurated in 1865 by Johannes Brahms with his Trio in E♭, opus 40. Related combinations are those of (1) oboe, horn, and piano, (2) clarinet, horn, and piano, (3) horn, bassoon, and piano and (4) flute, horn, and piano.

== Horn, violin and piano ==
| Composer | Title | Year of composition | Publisher | appr. duration |
|---|---|---|---|---|
| Hans Abrahamsen | Six Pieces for violin, horn, and piano | 1984 | Copenhagen: Edition Wilhelm Hansen | 15' |
| Don Banks | Trio for horn, violin, and piano | 1962 | London: Schott & Co. Ltd, 1966 | 15' |
| Lennox Berkeley | Trio for horn, violin and piano, Op. 44 | 1953? | London: J. W. Chester, 1956 | 25' |
| Johannes Brahms | Trio in E♭, opus 40 | 1865 | Simrock 1866 (rev.ver. Peters 1891) | 30' |
| Ann Callaway | Ballade | 2008 | from composer | 09' |
| Carl Czerny | Trio No. 1 in E♭ major, for violin, horn (or cello), and piano, Op. 105 | 1827 | Winterthur: Amadeus, 1997 (edited by Peter Schmalfuss) | 35' |
| Marc-André Dalbavie | Trio for violin, horn, and piano | | Paris: G. Billaudot, 2005 | 16' |
| Andrew Downes | Sonata for violin, horn and piano | 1998 | andrewdownes.com | 18'50" |
| Jan Ladislav Dussek | Notturno Concertante in E♭ major, for violin, horn, and piano, Op. 68 (also pub. as Op. 69) | 1809 | | |
| Eric Ewazen | Trio for horn, violin and piano | | [King of Prussia, PA]: Theodore Presser Co., 2012 | 21' |
| Marshall Fine | Music in Homage, trio for violin, horn, and piano, Op. 69 | 1991 | Empfindsam, 2015 | 13' |
| Michael Finnissy | Horn Trio, for violin, horn, and piano | 2012–13 | [S.l.]: Verlag Neue Musik, 2013 ISBN 9783733312442 | |
| Alexander Goehr | Largo siciliano, trio for violin, horn, and piano, Op. 91 | 2012 | London: Schott & Co., 2013 | 20' |
| Friedrich Goldmann | Trio for horn, violin, and piano | 2004 | | 14' |
| John Harbison | Twilight Music | 1985 | | |
| Alun Hoddinott | Dream Wanderer, Op. 178 | 2001 | | 15' |
| Joseph Holbrooke | Horn Trio, opus 28 | 1906–12? | | 27' |
| Vagn Holmboe | Musik med horn | 1981 | Copenhagen: Edition Wilhelm Hansen | 10' |
| Wilfred Josephs | Trio for horn, violin, and piano, Op. 76 | | Borough Green, Kent: Novello, 1975 | 18' |
| Karen Khachaturian | Trio for Waldhorn, violin and piano | | Moskva : Moskovskoe muzykalʹnoe izd-vo : Rossiĭskoe avtorskoe obshchestvo, [200-?] | |
| Charles Koechlin | Quatre petites pièces | 1896–1906 | Paris: Editions Max Eschig, 1974 | 8' |
| Karl Kohn | Trio for violin, horn, and piano | | New York: Carl Fischer, 1975 | |
| Hannah Lash | Three Movements for horn trio | 2012 | (manuscript) 2012 | |
| Henri Lazarof | Trio for horn, violin, and piano | | Bryn Mawr: Merion Music, 1995 | 20' |
| Lowell Liebermann | Trio for Violin, Horn and Piano, Op. 101 | 2007 | Theodore Presser Company, 2007 | 16' |
| György Ligeti | Trio for Violin, Horn and Piano | 1982 | Mainz and New York: B. Schott's Söhne, 1984 (facsimile edition, ED 7309); 2001 (engraved score, ED 7744) | 21' |
| Trygve Madsen | Trio for violin, horn, and piano, Op. 110 | before 2004 | | |
| Poul Ruders | Horn Trio | 1998 | Copenhagen : Edition Wilhelm Hansen, 2005. ISBN 9788759809808 | 25' |
| Heinrich Kaspar Schmid | Horn Trio | 1940 | Edition Walter Homolka, Musikverlag, 2001 | |
| Hermann Schroeder | Second Piano Trio, for violin, horn, and piano, Op. 40 | | Mainz: B. Schott's Söhne; New York: Schott Music Corp. (Associated Music Publishers), 1967 | |
| Gerard Schwarz | Trio for horn, violin, and piano | 2010 | [S.l.]: Custom print edition, 2012 | |
| Kurt Schwertsik | Trio for violin, horn, and piano ("aus den Salonstücken") | | Munich: Edition Modern, 1962 | |
| Netty Simons | Facets 1, for horn, violin, and piano | 1961 | Bryn Mawr, Pa.: Merion Music, 1986 | 06' |
| Robert Simpson | Trio for horn, violin, and piano | 1984 | | |
| Bernard Stevens | Trio for horn, violin, and piano, Op. 38 | 1966 | London: Alfred Lengnick & Co. Ltd. | 15' |
| Nancy Van de Vate | Trio for horn, violin, and piano | | Vienna: Vienna Masterworks, 2006 | |
| Huw Watkins | Horn Trio | 2008 | London: Schott & Co., 2012 | 13' |
| Hugh Wood | Trio for horn, violin, and piano, Op. 29 | 1987–89 | London: J. W. Chester, 1992 | 18' |
| Charles Wuorinen | Horn Trio | 1981 | New York: C. F. Peters, 1994 | 10'30" |
| Charles Wuorinen | Horn Trio Continued | 1985 | New York: C. F. Peters, 1994 | 09'30" |
| Charles Wuorinen | Double Solo for Horn Trio | 1985 | New York: C. F. Peters, 1995 | 14' |
| Yehudi Wyner | Horntrio, for horn, violin, and piano | 1997 | New York : Associated Music Publishers, 2006 | 19' |
| Istvàn Zelenka | Trio for horn, violin, and piano | 1958 | Munich: Edition Modern, 1960 | |

== Horn, oboe and piano ==
| Composer | Title | Year of composition | Publisher | appr. duration |
|---|---|---|---|---|
| Jean-Michel Damase | Trio for oboe, horn, and piano | | Paris: Editions Henry Lemoine, 1993 | 22' |
| Heinrich von Herzogenberg | Trio in D major for oboe, horn, and piano, Op. 61 | | Leipzig: J. Rieter-Biedermann, 1889; reprinted, Winterthur: Amadeus, 2002 | |
| Robert Kahn | Serenade for oboe, horn, and piano, Op. 73 | | Berlin: Simrock 1923 | |
| Carl Reinecke | Trio for oboe, horn, and piano in A major, Op. 188 | | Leipzig, 1887 | |

== Horn, clarinet and piano ==
| Composer | Title | Year of composition | Publisher | appr. duration |
|---|---|---|---|---|
| Howard J. Buss | Passage to Eden for clarinet, horn, and piano | 2001 | Brixton Publications (Cimarron Music Press) | 12' |
| Carl Reinecke | Trio for clarinet (or violin), horn (or viola), and piano in B♭ major, Op. 274 | | Leipzig, ca.1905; new edition, London: Musica Rara, 1969; reprinted Wiesbaden: Breitkopf & Härtel, 2000 | |
| Ananda Sukarlan | Trio "Mutahariana" based on themes by H. Mutahar for clarinet, horn and piano (2019) | | | |

== Horn, bassoon and piano ==
| Composer | Title | Year of composition | Publisher | appr. duration |
|---|---|---|---|---|
| Howard J. Buss | Trio Lyrique for clarinet, horn, and piano | 2001 | Brixton Publications (Cimarron Music Press) | 10' |

== Horn, flute and piano ==
| Composer | Title | Year of composition | Publisher | appr. duration |
|---|---|---|---|---|
| Eric Ewazen | Ballade, Pastorale & Dance | 1992–93 | San Antonio: Southern Music company, 2002 | 23' |
| Rudolf Tillmetz | Two nocturnes for horn, flute and harp or piano, Op. 32b | 1904-1912 | Max Eschig | |
| Charles Koechlin | Nocturne for flute, horn and piano, Op. 31 | ca. 1890 | Leipzig | 6' |
