= Louwerse =

Louwerse is a Dutch surname. Notable people with the surname include:

- Egbert Jan Louwerse (born 1975), Dutch flautist
- Mirusia Louwerse (born 1985), Australian soprano
