= Trio for horn, violin and piano (Banks) =

Chamber music work composed by Don Banks

The Trio for horn, violin, and piano is a chamber music work by the Australian composer Don Banks, composed in 1962. The Horn Trio was commissioned by the Edinburgh Festival, and was written especially for hornist Barry Tuckwell, violinist Brenton Langbein, and pianist Maureen Jones, in part because they were all Australians, like the composer. Tuckwell's virtuosity was particularly important in stimulating the conception of this trio, as well as the Horn Concerto that Banks composed for Tuckwell three years later.

A typical performance takes about 15 minutes.

== Analysis ==
The trio is in three movements:

1. Lento – Allegro moderato
2. Adagio espressivo
3. Moderato, scherzando

There is some disagreement concerning the compositional techniques employed. While Banks most often employed twelve-tone serial techniques in his concert music, one writer contends that the trio is an exception, while another describes it as atonal as well as serial.

Whatever the technical basis, the work is economically built from a small group of basic ideas, with an emphasis on the descending semitone and a perfect fourth.

After a slow introduction, the first movement falls into five main sections: a lyrical first section, a passage of fluctuating tempos featuring muted horn and sul ponticello violin, a slow section based on the unifying falling semitone, a horn cadenza, and a reprise of the first main section.

The second movement is slow and lyrical, in four sections defined in part by different pairings of the instruments. It opens with a long, flowing idea in the horn, accompanied by the piano. This is followed by a duet for violin and piano, then a con fantasia cadenza for horn and violin. In the final section, all three instruments sound together at last.

The finale is light in mood, in 6/8 time and marked scherzando, but in form is a rondo with a coda. The episodes develop the slow material from the third section of the first movement. The piano in this movement is marked by many bars of repeated quavers, and functions similarly to the rhythm section of a jazz ensemble.

== See also ==
- Trio for horn, violin, and piano (Berkeley)
- Horn Trio (Brahms)
- Horn Trio (Holbrooke)
- Trio for Violin, Horn and Piano (Ligeti)
