= Memento Mori (Sculthorpe) =

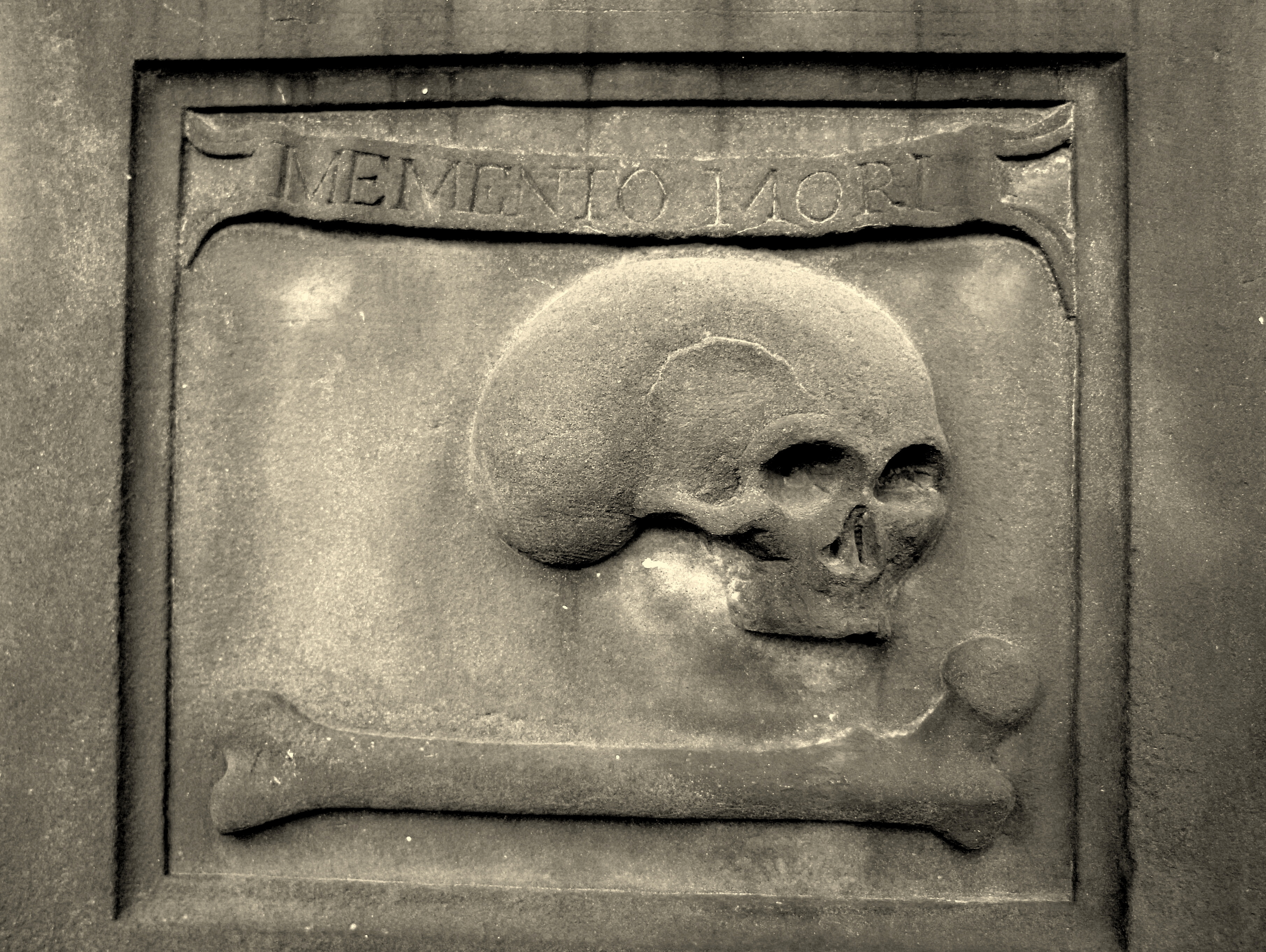
Gravestone inscription of memento more, the medieval Christian idea which inspired the title of the composition.

Memento Mori (1993) is a composition for orchestra by Peter Sculthorpe. The title refers to the medieval Christian idea of memento mori, and the piece itself makes frequent references to the plainchant setting of the Latin hymn "Dies irae".

== Conception ==
Laurie Strachan wrote in The Australian, when reviewing the piece on October 22, 1993, that "[t]he work was inspired by a visit to Easter Island, famous for its great stone heads, monuments that can be seen as both an example of the indomitable nature of the human spirit and as part of its great folly - for their making and transportation deforested and impoverished the island." When composing, Memento Mori, Sculthorpe focused on the link between 'the personal notion of morality' and the 'extended environmental sense of fragility', using 'Easter Island as a parable for planet Earth and population growth'.

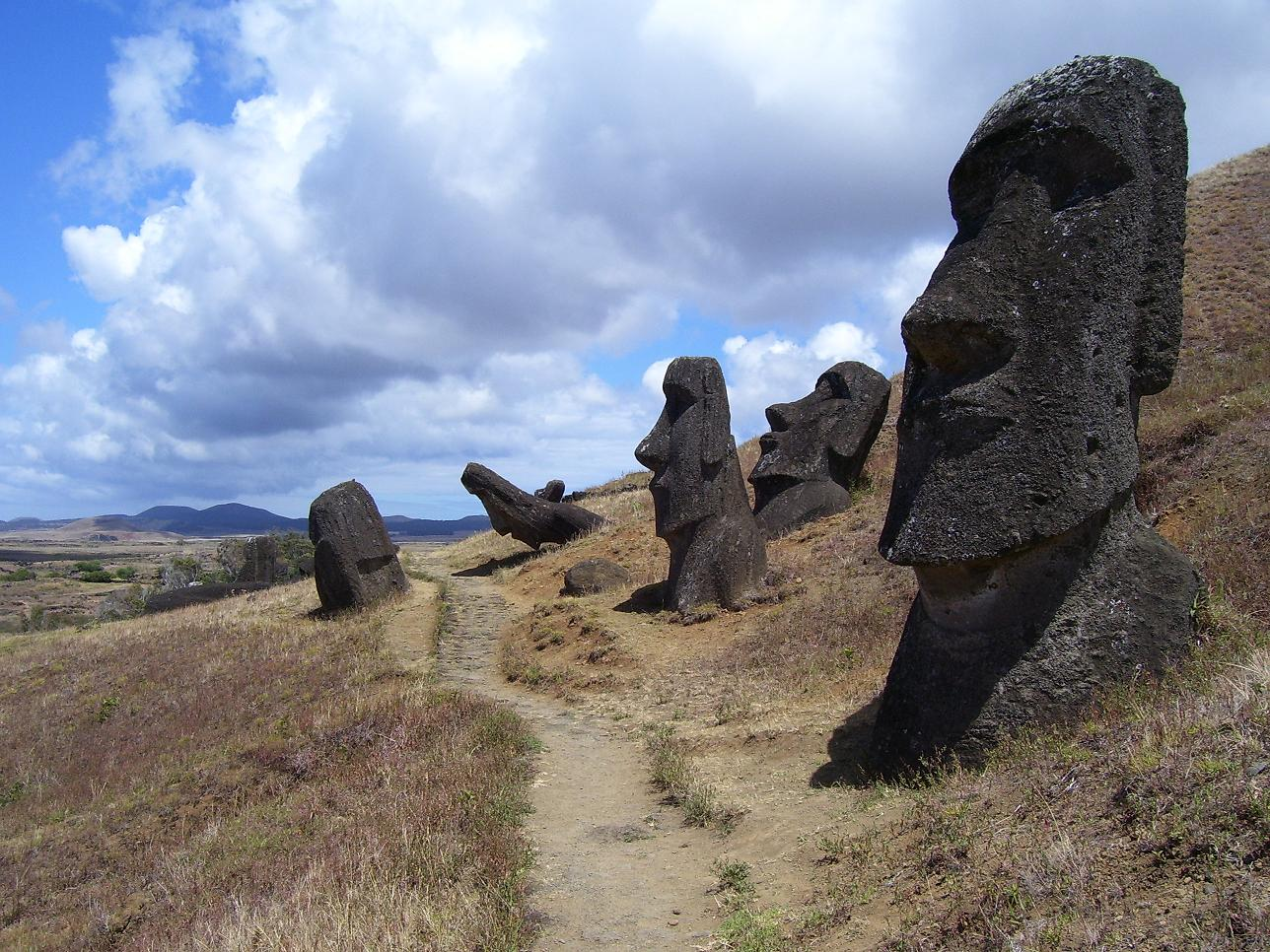
Moai at Rano Raraku, Easter Island; a visit to Easter Island was where the composer gained inspiration for the composition.

In the original programme notes, the composer described the way he conceived of the work:

It seems that on Easter Island, at the beginning of the seventeenth century, there was a population explosion. The inhabitants stripped the island of trees, causing soil erosion and depriving themselves of building materials for boats and housing. Retreating to caves, clans fought each other, and finally there was enslavement and cannibalization. By the time the first Europeans arrived, in 1722, the survivors had even forgotten the significance of the great stone heads that still stand there.

Easter Island is a memento mori (literally, "remember to die") for this planet. The concern of this work, therefore, is not with what happened to the inhabitants of Easter Island, but with what could happen to all of us, with what could happen to the human race.

— Peter Sculthorpe,

== Reception ==
The work has received mixed reviews. Joseph McLellan, writing in The Washington Post, stated that:

It is a piece imbued with a religious aura, rooted in a particular landscape - barren, mysterious Easter Island, with its enormous, brooding, enigmatic statues. And it is full of tunes, most notably the ancient plainchant Dies irae, which has been used by many classical composers but seldom with the blend of reverence and coloristic effectiveness Sculthorpe has achieved … It was marvelously effective music, innovative in sound but listener-friendly.

— Joseph McLellan,

Laurie Strachan, writing in The Australian, was similarly positive, writing that Memento Mori was 'one of [Sculthorpe's] most immediately appealing scores.' Strachan went on further to say that '[t]here are some hauntingly beautiful melodies and striking tonal contrasts. Some play is made of the plainchant Dies irae but this is not overdone and the whole thing ends on a note of quiet resolution that's absolutely right.’

Conversely, Andrew Clements, while reviewing a CD of Sculthorpe's work for The Guardian, said that the Memento Mori was "the most conventional and least effective piece on [the] disc".

== Instrumentation ==
The music is scored for two flutes (flute 2 doubling piccolo), two clarinets, two oboes, two bassoons, four horns, four trumpets, two trombones, bass trombone, tuba, timpani, percussion (two players), and strings.

== Form ==
Memento Mori is in one movement and last for approximately 14 minutes. It is in common time and the tempo is lento. The piece opens with an introduction, which them leads into two statements of the Dies irae plainchant, part of the Latin mass for the dead:

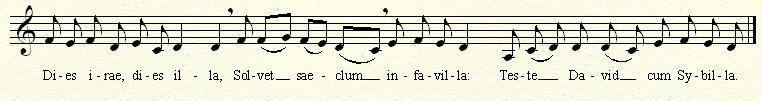

Following this, the music oscillates between the pitches of G and A-flat. The composer notes that this is because the astronomer Kepler believed those pitches to be the sound of the planet Earth. Then there a further two statements of the Dies irae plainchant, by which the music reaches a solemn climax, followed by more somber music.

== Commission and performance ==
The work was commissioned by the ABC for performance by West Australian Symphony Orchestra. It was first performed by the West Australian Symphony Orchestra, with Jorge Mester conducting, on July 2, 1993, in the Perth Concert Hall. It has subsequently been performed several times, most recently by the Queensland Conservatorium Symphony Orchestra, with Peter Morris conducting, on March 27, 2015.
