= David Wickham =

David Wickham (born 1966) is a British concert pianist, music director and conductor. He was born in Worthing, West Sussex.

== Performing career ==
As an accompanist, Wickham has worked with Sara Macliver, Aivale Cole, Taryn Fiebig, Michael Goldschlager, Fiona Campbell, Margaret Blades, Sergei Leiferkus, Michelle de Young, Krysia Osostowicz, Barnaby Robson, Andrew Webster, Emma Pearson, Libby Hammer, Gregory Yurisich, Mark Gasser and Ruby Philogene in recital. Conductors he has worked with include Steuart Bedford, Charles Peebles, Jane Glover and Richard Mills. He has performed in many prestigious venues include London's Wigmore Hall and Purcell Room, the Bridgewater Hall in Manchester, Hamburg's BP Studienhaus, the Belgisches Haus in Cologne, the Vonderau Museum in Fulda, the Grand Salle de Commerce in Lille and Wellington Town Hall in New Zealand.

He has made numerous ABC broadcasts with singers such as Sara Macliver and Fiona Campbell, and his piano trio, PVC. Wickham has appeared in every ABC Classic FM Sunday Live series since 2004 in Australia and has also broadcast recitals for BBC Radio 3 and UK Classic FM.

Wickham has recorded a CD of Australian art songs by Raymond Hanson, entitled The Poet Sings, with soprano Lisa Harper-Brown for Stone Records in 2012.

He trained at the Guildhall School of Music and Drama and studied with Norman Beedie, Paul Roberts and later with Graham Johnson and Paul Hamburger.

== Conducting ==
He was a member of the music staff of the Australian Opera Studio from 2003 to 2006, where he was music director for productions of Giulio Cesare, Don Quichotte, Carmen, Così fan tutte, Rodelinda, Manon, Bastien und Bastienne and Trouble in Tahiti, as well as Elijah and four cabarets. At the Western Australian Academy of Performing Arts he has conducted Candide, A Midsummer Night's Dream, Malcolm Williamson's English Eccentrics, Trial by Jury, and Poulenc's Dialogues of the Carmelites. The Australian Opera Studio's 2005 cabaret, of which Wickham was music director, won an award for the best live broadcast in the ABC's Sunday Live series. Wickham was music director and pianist for the 2009 Opera Under the Stars event on Broome's Cable Beach. In 2010, he conducted The Mikado for West Australian Opera and the West Australian Symphony Orchestra to 15,000 people in Perth, with simulcasts to large audiences in Geraldton and Bunbury, Western Australia.

== Répétiteur ==
As a répétiteur, Wickham worked for English National Opera, Welsh National Opera and Scottish Opera, and spent nine seasons with Garsington Opera. He has also worked on several productions for Broomhill Opera and West Australian Opera, including Richard Mills' award-winning The Love of the Nightingale, described in the press as "the operatic event of the year."
