= Rachel Valler =

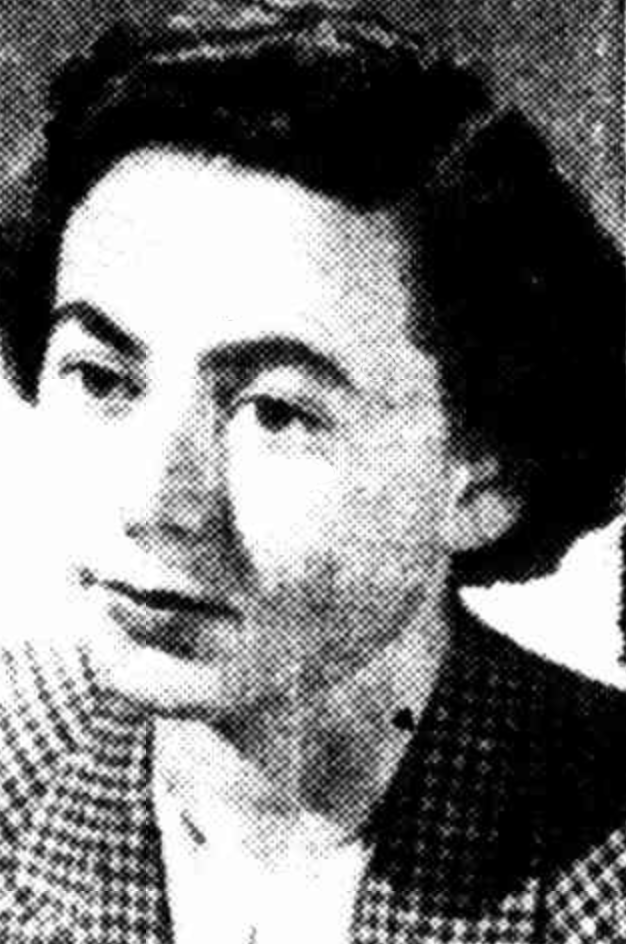
- Rachel Valler c1954

Background information
- Also known as: Rachel Travers
- Born: c1930 Sydney, Australia
- Occupation: musician
- Instrument: piano
- Formerly of: Hazelwood Trio

Rachel Valler OAM (b. c1930 Sydney, Australia) is an Australian pianist. She was a member of the Hazelwood Trio.

== Career ==
Rachel Valler's parents, Sonia and Joseph Vallerstein, arrived in Australia from Russia in 1927. Valler was their only daughter, born in Sydney.

She studied piano from an early age, performed with the Zionist Youth League during her teens as a solo pianist, and was mentored by Ignaz Friedman until his death in 1948. She also studied with Alexander Hmelnitsky.

As a soloist, she performed with the Sydney Symphony Orchestra and music clubs in 1951 aged 21. That same year she received her Bachelor of Arts at Sydney University, and went onto gain a Diploma of Education from Melbourne University.

She taught music and worked in the library at Ascham Girls School, and won the State final of the ABC Concerto Competition in 1954. Although she did not win the Commonwealth finals, she was commended for her "thoughtful, searching, sensitive playing" of Chopin.

She travelled to London in the early 1950s, and taught piano while studying with the Hungarian pianist Ilona Kabos. While there, she was awarded the Commonwealth Medal in the Harriet Cohen International Competition for 1956.

During the 1980s she was considered one of Australia's most distinguished classical musicians, alongside Donald Hazelwood and Anne Menzies. Together they performed as the Hazelwood Trio.

She was also head teacher of English and Humanities, at Randwick Technical College.

In 1995 she was awarded an Order of Australia Medal for service to music.

She is married to Walter Travers.
