= Alexander Hmelnitsky =

Classical pianist and pedagogue

- Born: 16 April 1891; Kyiv, Ukraine
- Died: 25 January 1965 (aged 73); Katoomba, New South Wales, Australia
- Education: Moscow Conservatory
- Occupations: Pianist; Music pedagogue; Music director
- Organizations: Sydney Conservatorium of Music; ABC

Alexander Hmelnitsky (16 April 1891 – 25 January 1965) was a Russian pianist and pedagogue.

== Life ==
Born in 1891 in Kiev, Ukraine (then part of the Russian Empire) to a musician father, Hmelnitsky trained at the Moscow Conservatory and performed at the court of Tsar Nicholas II. He worked as the musical director for the famous dancer Anna Pavlova and was a founding member of the Moscow Trio. During World War I he served in the Russian army, losing the sight in one eye.

Following the Russian Revolution, Alexander and his family left for Asia where he opened a music academy in Shanghai, China, and later moved on to Java, Indonesia, where his eldest son the distinguished pianist Igor Hmelnitsky (1920–1987) was born. The family emigrated to Sydney, Australia in 1925.

In Sydney he was involved in teaching at the W. H. Paling studios, recording (including works by Russian composers that had not been performed in Sydney) and he became musical director of the Sydney ABC radio station 2FC. He also made piano rolls for Mastertouch.

His pedagogical specialty was the Russian Romantic school and the traditional teaching methods of the Moscow Conservatory. His notable pupils included his son Igor, Maureen Jones and Rachel Valler.

Later in life he became almost entirely blind.

Hmelnitsky died on 25 January 1965 at Katoomba in the Blue Mountains, NSW and was buried in the Russian Orthodox tradition. He was survived by his wife Ludmila Estrin, a professional cellist, and three sons, all of whom were musicians. In February 2024 his grandson, Justice James Hmelnitsky, was sworn in to the Supreme Court of New South Wales.
