= Gabriella Pusner =

Australian Classical pianist and pedagogue

- Genres: Classical
- Occupation(s): Pianist and pedagogue

Gabriella Pusner is an Australian classical pianist and pedagogue.

== Studies and career ==
Pusner studied with the distinguished pianist and pedagogue Igor Hmelnitsky and graduated with both Teacher and Performer Diplomas from the Sydney Conservatorium of Music. She received the Shadforth Hooper Memorial Prize for the most outstanding recitalist.

She was an Australian competitor and finalist in several international piano competitions including the Queen Elizabeth Competition in Belgium.

As well as giving solo recitals, Pusner has been a distinguished associate artist, particularly with flautists including notable international performers Denis Bouriakov and Alexa Still.

Pusner has been a lecturer at the Sydney Conservatorium, the Music Department of the University of Newcastle and she is the director of the piano school at Sydney's Theme & Variations Piano Services.

Notable Australian composers have written for Pusner. In 1981 at Sydney Conservatorium's Verbrugghen Hall she gave the world premiere of the piano solo Mountains by the eminent composer Peter Sculthorpe, a work commissioned by the Sydney International Piano Competition. Also written for her was the piano solo Theme & Variations: on "The Snow It Melts the Soonest" (trad.) by the composer Mark Isaacs.
