= Igor Hmelnitsky =

Classical pianist and pedagogue

- Born: 27 December 1920; Java, Dutch East Indies
- Died: 27 September 1987 (aged 66) Sydney, Australia
- Genres: Classical
- Occupations: Pianist and pedagogue

Igor Hmelnitsky (27 December 1920 – 27 September 1987) was a distinguished classical pianist and pedagogue who was based for most of his life in Australia, where he built his reputation.

== Life ==
Igor Hmelnitsky was born in Java, then in the Dutch East Indies (now Indonesia). His father, the noted pianist Alexander Hmelnitsky, had emigrated to Asia from Kiev, Ukraine after the Russian Revolution. In 1925 the family moved on to Sydney.

Igor served in the Royal Netherlands Air Force during World War II. In his ensuing Australian musical career he was known as an exponent of the grand Romantic school of classical pianism. He performed for the Australian Broadcasting Corporation and promoted the piano works of the Australian composer Raymond Hanson.

From 1972 to 1985 he taught at the Sydney Conservatorium of Music. A notable student was the Australian pianist and teacher Gabriella Pusner.

Igor Hmelnitsky died of cancer on 27 September 1987 at St Vincent's Hospital, Sydney, and was survived by his fifth wife and four children. In February 2024 his nephew Justice James Hmelnitsky was sworn in to the Supreme Court of New South Wales.

== Medical research ==
Igor Hmelnitsky undertook significant medical studies to help inform his pedagogy, and he co-authored a research paper examining weight-bearing manipulation in piano playing, along with the syndrome of overuse.
