= Opera Factory =

Experimental opera ensemble

Opera Factory was an experimental opera ensemble founded by Australian director David Freeman. (Note: There are three other unrelated organizations which go by the same name. Opera Factory in Freiburg, Germany specialises in rarely performed works. Opera Factory in Auckland, New Zealand is a training company for young singers. "The Opera Factory" is also the name of Scottish Opera's program for teaching the subject in primary schools.) It operated in Zurich from 1976 to 1995 and in London from 1982 to 1998. In the 1980s when the company worked with the London Sinfonietta, its productions were billed as Opera Factory London Sinfonietta (OFLS). Known for its avant garde and often controversial productions, the company's 1986 Così fan tutte was described by The Guardian's music critic, Andrew Clements as one of the "ten productions that changed British opera".

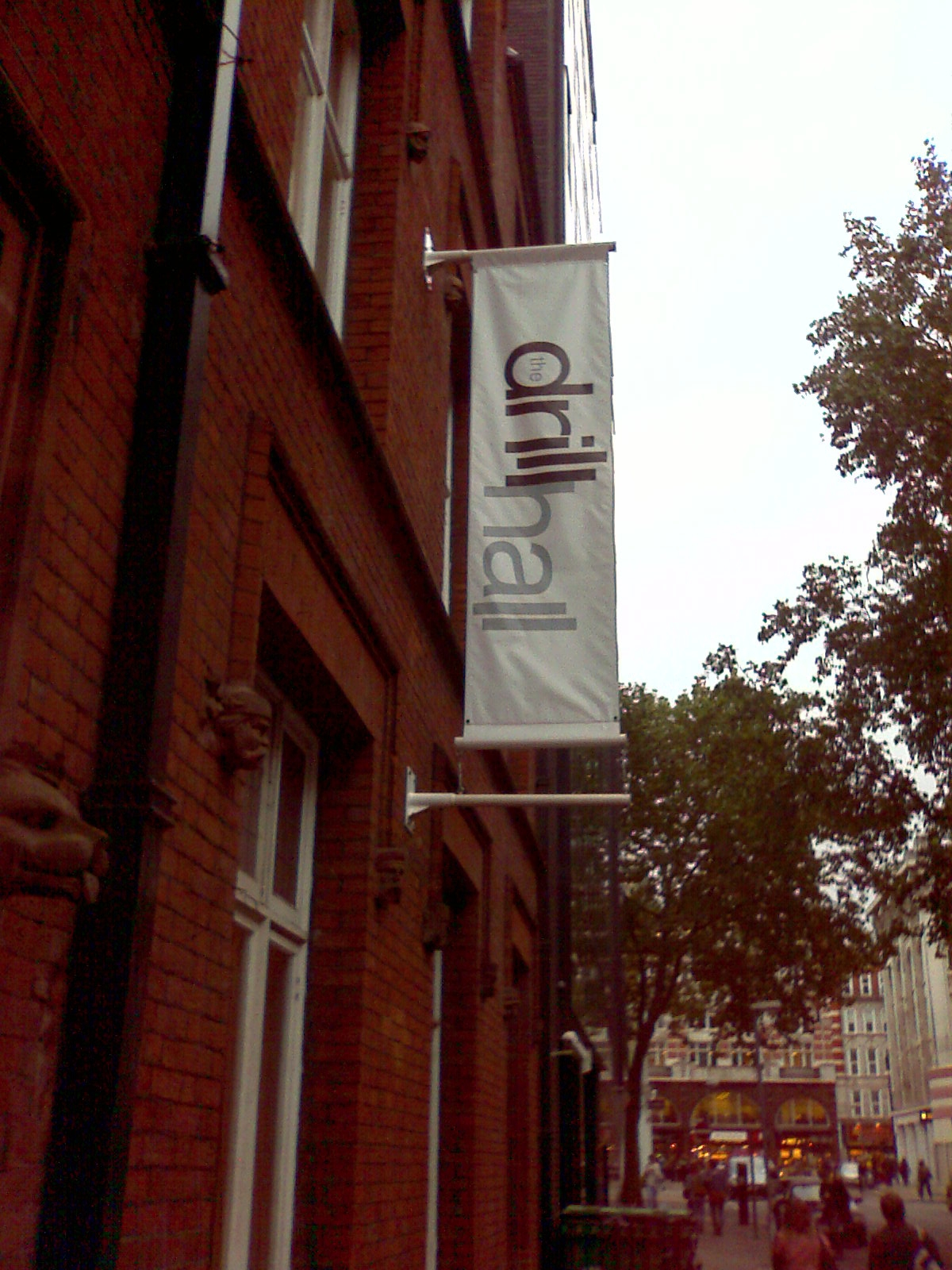
The Drill Hall, where Opera Factory's first and last London productions were presented

Opera Factory aimed to bring the techniques of Peter Brook and Jerzy Grotowski to music drama. David Freeman wrote that it would "have the luxury of being able to question many of the assumptions about opera and its role in society which a large company, because of its very size, can afford neither the time nor the money to do". He expressed a similar sentiment in a 1989 profile in Opera magazine where he criticised the approach of major opera houses, such as the Royal Opera House, Metropolitan Opera, and La Scala, which viewed opera productions as largely defined by their costumes: "It's museum art taken to its logical conclusion."

== History ==
David Freeman (b. 1952) began the first incarnation of Opera Factory in Sydney in 1972 while he was still a student. He then moved to Switzerland when his friend and fellow student at the University of Sydney, the opera singer Leslie Stephenson, joined Zurich Opera for further training. In 1976, Freeman, Stephenson, and the conductor Brenton Langbein founded Opera Factory Zurich with Langbein as its first music director. In 1981 the company brought their production of Handel's Acis and Galatea to London encouraged by Lord Harewood, who at the time was the managing director of English National Opera. He also encouraged them to set up a permanent London branch. The original plan was for the company to be supported by the ENO, but a permanent deal never materialised. However, with the proceeds from their productions and the support of the London Sinfonietta and later the South Bank as well as grants from Arts Council England, the London company survived until 1998. Its last production was And the Snake Sheds Its Skin, with text by David Freeman and music by the Senegalese pop composer Habib Faye. The Zurich branch of the Opera Factory continued in parallel until 1995 when it lost its subsidy from the city of Zurich. Opera Factory Zurich's last productions were a joint run of Britten's Curlew River and Purcell's Dido and Aeneas.

== Productions ==
Opera Factory's London productions included:

| Composer | Title | Year and Place of Production | Notes |
|---|---|---|---|
| Harrison Birtwistle | Punch and Judy | January 1982 at The Drill Hall, Chenies Street London (now RADA Studios) | Joint run with The Beggar's Opera |
| John Gay | The Beggar's Opera | January 1982 at The Drill Hall, Chenies Street London (now RADA Studios) | Joint run with Punch and Judy |
| Michael Tippett | The Knot Garden | June 1984 at the Royal Court Theatre, London | Opera Factory London Sinfonietta |
| Francesco Cavalli | La Calisto | June 1984 at the Royal Court Theatre, London | Conducted by Paul Daniel |
| Harrison Birtwistle | Yan Tan Tethera | August 1986 at the Queen Elizabeth Hall, London | Opera Factory London Sinfonietta. Joint run with Così fan tutte |
| Wolfgang Amadeus Mozart | Così fan tutte | August 1986 at the Queen Elizabeth Hall, London | Opera Factory London Sinfonietta. Joint run with Yan Tan Tethera |
| Peter Maxwell Davies | Eight Songs for a Mad King | August 1987 at the Queen Elizabeth Hall, London | Opera Factory London Sinfonietta. Maxwell Davies, Ligeti and Weill formed a three-part programme. Joint run with the Iphigenias. |
| György Ligeti | Aventures/Nouvelles Aventures | August 1987 at the Queen Elizabeth Hall, London | Opera Factory London Sinfonietta. Maxwell Davies, Ligeti and Weill formed a three-part programme. Joint run with the Iphigenias. |
| Kurt Weill | Mahagonny-Songspiel | August 1987 at the Queen Elizabeth Hall, London | Opera Factory London Sinfonietta. Maxwell Davies, Ligeti and Weill formed a three-part programme. Joint run with the Iphigenias. |
| Christoph Willibald Gluck | Iphigénie en Aulide | August 1987 at the Queen Elizabeth Hall, London | Opera Factory London Sinfonietta. The Iphigenias formed a two-part programme. Joint run with the Maxwell Davies, Ligeti and Weillthree-part programme. |
| Christoph Willibald Gluck | Iphigénie en Tauride | August 1987 at the Queen Elizabeth Hall, London | Opera Factory London Sinfonietta. The Iphigenias formed a two-part programme. Joint run with the Maxwell Davies, Ligeti and Weillthree-part programme. |
| Wolfgang Amadeus Mozart | Così fan tutte | September 1988 at the Queen Elizabeth Hall, London | Opera Factory London Sinfonietta. |
| August Strindberg | The Ghost Sonata | February 1989 at the Queen Elizabeth Hall, London | Joint run with the Reimann opera which was based on the play. |
| Aribert Reimann | Die Gespenstersonate | February 1989 at the Queen Elizabeth Hall, London | Joint run with the Strindberg play on which it was based. |
| Wolfgang Amadeus Mozart | Così fan tutte | July 1989 at Elstree Studios Studio 9 | Opera Factory London Sinfonietta. Live recording for Channel 4 television. |
| Wolfgang Amadeus Mozart | Don Giovanni | February 1990 at the Queen Elizabeth Hall, London | |
