= Trio for horn, violin, and piano (Berkeley) =

The Trio for horn, violin, and piano, Op. 44, is a chamber music work by the English composer Lennox Berkeley. It was composed in the early 1950s and was premiered in March 1954 in London. A performance takes about 15 minutes.

== History ==
The Horn Trio was commissioned by the pianist Colin Horsley for hornist Dennis Brain, with whom he had enjoyed playing the Brahms Horn Trio. Together with the violinist Manoug Parikian, they gave the first performance of the trio for the Chamber Music Society at the Victoria and Albert Museum, South Kensington, on Sunday, 28 March 1954. They also made the first recording, issued on HMV CLP 1029. The year of composition is given variously as the late 1940s, 1952, 1953, and 1954. The trio is one of Berkeley's most often performed and recorded chamber music works.

== Analysis ==
The trio is in three movements:

1. Allegro
2. Lento
3. Tema con variazioni

The opening Allegro is dominated by the interval of the perfect fourth, and in general alternates pairs of the instruments, rather than using all three together. Although they are not the basis of the entire work, Berkeley's use of fourths in the opening of this movement resembles the free atonality of the Chamber Symphony No. 1 by Arnold Schoenberg, but this sound was also very much in the air amongst British composers at that time, in particular Michael Tippett's Piano Concerto. The character of this movement rests largely on its springy rhythms, moving at the end to a calm close in F major.

The Lento is a slow dirge with a more lively middle section, and the only movement that shows much affinity with the Brahms trio. The long main theme is given first to the horn and then the violin plays transformations of it.

The last movement is in F major, and consists of a series of variations on an original theme that nevertheless strongly recalls Mozart. The theme is characterized at the beginning by a leap of a seventh and continues with a song-like melodic line, followed by ten variations. The sixth variation is a waltz, and the seventh uses the theme as a ground bass. The harmonies deliberately contrast triadic sonorities with chords built from fourths and sevenths, and there are recollections of motivic material from the first movement.

== See also ==
- Trio for horn, violin, and piano (Banks)
- Horn Trio (Holbrooke)
- Trio for Violin, Horn and Piano (Ligeti)
