= Ashot Ariyan =

Armenian composer and pianist, residing in Canada (born 1973)

Ashot Ariyan Աշոտ Արիյան
- Born: April 3, 1973 (age 53); Armenian SSR
- Origin: Armenian
- Genres: classical music 21st-century music
- Occupations: Pianist, composer for orchestral, chamber and vocal music
- Instrument: Piano
- Years active: –present
- Website: www.ashotariyan.com

Ashot Ariyan (Armenian: Աշոտ Արիյան, Russian: Ашот Размикович Ариян; born April 3, 1973) is an Armenian composer and pianist, residing in Canada. He is the author of more than 25 compositions including an opera-ballet, two symphonies, a piano concerto, two symphonic frescos, and a number of chamber works. His compositions have been performed in concert halls in Russia, Armenia, Belgium, Germany, Spain, Canada and the United States.

== Biography ==
A native of Armenia, he moved to Moscow to continue his education in composition at the Moscow Tchaikovsky State Conservatory, where he graduated with distinction in 2001. A year later, after gaining a master's degree, he became a Teaching Assistant of Prof. Karen Khachaturian at the Moscow Conservatory and taught as a lecturer in Composition and Music Theory.

In 2007 he moved to Canada to complete his doctoral thesis at the University of Montreal, receiving his doctorate in 2013 (doctoral advisor prof. Denis Gougeon). The goal of his doctoral program was to revive the neglected genre of opera-ballet by writing his own work in that medium, entitled "Bilgamesh" (or "Gilgamesh"), in which the archaic Mesopotamian languages Sumerian and Akkadian are used exclusively.

Ashot Ariyan has taught Composition and Music Theory at several music institutions including the Central Music School of Moscow Conservatory (ЦМШ), Moscow Tchaikovsky Conservatory, the University of Montreal, and McMaster University.

In 1999, to wide acclaim, Ashot Ariyan performed his own "Concerto-Brevis" for piano and orchestra in the Great Hall of the Moscow Conservatory, accompanied by the Russian Philharmonic Orchestra. In 2009 his symphonic fresco "Sounds of Stonehenge" was performed in Montreal by the UdeM Symphony Orchestra. Later, in January 2011, the same work was performed in Armenia by the National Philharmonic Orchestra and in Moscow by the Moscow State Orchestra. His recent work, Planète X (Un train pour l'enfer II) for seven instruments, was performed in Montreal with great success by the Arkea ensemble in November 2013. Many of his chamber works were first performed at the Moscow Autumn International Music Festival. One of his latest works is a Cycle of 12 Fugues and Postludes for piano, commissioned by the Region of Waterloo Art Fund. In May 2022, a recording company RMN Music has released a "Fugue and Postlude in A" as part of the Modern Music for Piano 4 catalog. In 2016 his music accompanied a presentation of the ballet "Two Suns" directed by Rudolf Kharatian and dedicated to the Centennial of the Armenian genocide.

Starting 2020 the ballet "Two Suns" has periodically been broadcast on the Mezzo TV. Ashot Ariyan has recently been commissioned to compose a piano piece for the Nashville International Chopin Piano Competition which will be held in October 2023.

== Selected works and music pieces ==
=== Academic publications ===
- Ashot Ariyan Bilgamesh, un ballet-opéra en deux actes: symbiose d'un genre oublié, une mythologie archaïque et une langue morte, Saarbrücken, Deutschland: Presses Académiques Francophones, 2015, ISBN 9783838144238.

=== Stage ===
- Bilgamesh (Gilgamesh) (opera–ballet), 2009–12

=== Orchestral music ===
- Symphony No. 1, 'Manfred', string orchestra, harp, timpani, 1994–96
- Concerto-Brevis, piano, orchestra, 1999
- Symphony No. 2, 2000–01
- Skanda (symphonic fresco no. 1), duduk (oboe from Armenia), orchestra, fixed media, 2002
- Sounds of Stonehenge (symphonic fresco no. 2), 2009
- Perpetuum Mobile, string orchestra, 2016
- Adagio, string orchestra, 2024

=== Choral music ===
- For Armenia (text by Valery Bryusov), mixed chorus, 1997
- Deus Lucem, mixed chorus, 2014

=== Vocal music ===
- Romance (text by Hovhannes Tumanyan), voice, piano, 1989
- Three Taron Songs (text from a folk source from Armenia), mezzo-soprano, piano, 1994
- Das Grablied (text by Friedrich Nietzsche), baritone, piano, 2017

=== Piano music ===
- Children's Pieces, 1989, revised 2015
- Sonata, 1990
- Toccata, Intermedia and Fugue, 1995
- Three Pieces, 1997
- 11 Fugues and Postludes, 2015
- "Nashville Nocturne" for piano (commissioned by the Nashville International Chopin Piano Competition), 2023
- Five Elegant Pieces for piano, 2024

=== Chamber music ===
- Ballade, clarinet, piano, 1991
- Trio, violin, cello, piano, 1993–94
- Capriccio, violin, 1997
- Amaras, clarinet, cello, piano, 1997
- Dedication, cello, 1998
- String Quartet No. 1, 1998–99
- Resonances, French horn, 2 trumpets, trombone, 2 violins, viola, cello, piano, 2005–06
- Dusk, cello, piano, 2007
- Planète X. (Un Train pour l'enfer II), 7 players, 2013
- Sonata for violin and piano, 2020–21
- String Quartet No. 2, 2022

== Links ==
- Samvel Danielyan A Canadian-Armenian composer Ashot Ariyan about his works, particularly, his opera-ballet "Bilgamesh" Aravot, 2016
- Denis Gougeon "Que le soleil soit toujours avec vous" Chapelle historique du Bon-Pasteur
- Ариян Ашот. В НАЧАЛЕ БЫЛ ЗВУК
- The Nashville Nocturne
