= Maureen Jones =

Australian classical pianist (1927–2026)

- Jones in 1947
- Born: Maureen Rose Jones; 6 June 1927; Sydney, New South Wales, Australia
- Died: 11 August 2026 (aged 99); Lugano, Ticino, Switzerland
- Occupations: Pianist; Music pedagogue
- Organizations: Musica Viva; Quintetto Fauré; Fiesole School of Music
- Spouses: Dario De Rosa (divorced); Amedeo Baldovino (died 1998)
- Children: 1
- Awards: Order of Merit of the Italian Republic

Maureen Rose Jones (6 June 1927 – 11 August 2026) was an Australian classical pianist and music pedagogue. She began as a child prodigy and subsequently joined the new ensemble Musica Viva, being described as a key figure in the early history of that organisation for chamber music.

Jones moved to Europe for further studies and spent the rest of her life there, notably playing chamber music in a trio with violinist Brenton Langbein and horn player Barry Tuckwell, in a piano duo with Dario De Rosa, and in the Quintetto Fauré Di Roma which she co-founded. Jones performed the Italian premiere of Britten's Piano Concerto with the RAI Orchestra of Turin, and she played Tippett's Piano Concerto at the 1973 Proms with the Royal Philharmonic Orchestra. She taught chamber music with piano at the Fiesole School of Music.

== Life and career ==
=== Australia ===
Maureen Rose Jones was born in Sydney on 6 June 1927. She grew up in the Sydney suburbs of Warrawee, Turramurra, and Gladesville. She began playing piano at age six and won the under-10 piano section at the Sydney Eisteddfod in both 1935 and 1936, along with the under-12 sightreading section in the latter year. She was taught by Millicent Farraher. At age 10, she was invited to study with pianist Alexander Hmelnitsky at the Sydney Conservatorium of Music by its director Edgar Bainton and made her first radio broadcast with the Australian Broadcasting Commission playing a pastoral sonata by Domenico Scarlatti and Mozart's Fantasia in D minor. At age 12, she was described in the Sydney newspaper The Sun as "well-known to Sydney concert-goers", and at age 13, she performed the first movement of Beethoven's Piano Concerto No. 1 in a concert for children with the Sydney Symphony Orchestra. She later said of her childhood that she felt like a "performing monkey" due to her parents entering her into so many piano competitions; after she left home as a teenager, her mother sold the fifty trophies she had won, and she later recovered only one of them.

She performed with Musica Viva from 1948 to 1950, having been invited by Richard Goldner, and helped shape the new ensemble, with Goldner, Robert Pikler and Edward Cockman, playing hundreds of concerts. She was described as a key figure in the organisation's early history.

=== Europe ===
Jones briefly lived in London and then went to Zurich, where she formed a duo with Australian violinist Brenton Langbein, playing concerts in Switzerland and Italy. The two formed a trio with the Australian horn player Barry Tuckwell. Don Banks's 1962 Horn Trio, commissioned for them by the Edinburgh International Festival, became a standard work.

She played recitals, for example at the Vienna Konzerthaus in 1957, where she performed Beethoven's Piano Sonata No. 6, the First Piano Sonata by Brahms, and works by Debussy, Schubert and Mendelssohn. Jones began collaborating on four-hand piano repertoire with Dario De Rosa, the pianist of the Trio di Trieste, whom she married; she moved to Trieste with him, and the couple had a daughter. She later married the cellist of the trio, Amedeo Baldovino. She also played chamber music with the Amadeus Quartet, cellist Enrico Bronzi and violinist Takaya Urakawa. In 1979, she co-founded Quintetto Fauré Di Roma with violinist Pina Carmirelli.

Jones performed with the London Symphony Orchestra and the Tonhalle-Orchester Zürich, for the BBC, the RAI, the Accademia Nazionale di Santa Cecilia and at La Fenice in Venice. She collaborated with conductors including Pierre Boulez, Dutoit and Gianandrea Gavazzeni. She performed the Italian premiere of Britten's Piano Concerto with the RAI Orchestra of Turin, conducted by Mario Rossi, which she later recalled as one of her favourite concerts. When she played this concerto at the 1961 Edinburgh International Festival with the Berlin Philharmonic conducted by Rudolf Kempe, reviewer Martin Cooper from The Telegraph wrote:

She proved not only fully in command of the hard-hitting virtuoso writing of the first and last movements… To the sophisticated waltz movement she brought an extraordinary grace and delicacy, as well as the wide range of tone colour and dynamics".

She also performed Tippett's Piano Concerto at the 1973 BBC Proms with the Royal Philharmonic Orchestra conducted by Norman Del Mar. She returned to Australia regularly, to perform and to teach.

She lived in Rome for ten years until moving to Florence to teach the advanced course in chamber music with piano alongside De Rosa at the Fiesole School of Music. She lived with Baldovino until his death in 1998. After 18 years in Florence, she moved to Lugano, Switzerland. In 2008, Jones donated a 15-piece collection of compositions to the Fiesole School of Music, containing printed music for piano four hands spanning the period from the 1750s to the 1930s. In 2017, she performed a concert in Trieste for her 90th birthday with pianist Massimiliano Baggio, a long-time collaborator and former student; they played Brahms's two-piano arrangement of his Piano Quartet No. 2 in A, Op. 26, a work new to Jones's repertoire, along with pieces by Franz Schubert and Antonín Dvořák. They played a similar concert in November that year at the Fiesole School of Music where she had previously taught. She was made a Knight of the Order of Merit of the Italian Republic.

Jones died in Lugano on 11 August 2026, at the age of 99; Her death was not widely reported until September of that year.
