= Karen Khachaturian =

Russian composer (1920-2011)

Karen Surenovich Khachaturian (Russian: Карэн Суренович Хачатурян, Armenian: Կարեն Խաչատրյան; 19 September 1920 – 19 July 2011) was a Soviet and Russian composer of Armenian ethnicity, the nephew of composer Aram Khachaturian.

== Early life and education ==
Karen Surenovich Khachaturian was born on 19 September 1920 in Moscow, the son of Suren Khachaturian, a theatrical director.

His studies under Genrikh Litinsky at the Moscow Conservatory were interrupted by a term of duty in the entertainment division of the Red Army. Resuming his studies in 1945, he worked with Dmitri Shostakovich and Nikolai Myaskovsky.

== Career and works ==
In addition to a Violin Sonata (1947), his works include a Cello Sonata (1966), a String Quartet (1969), four symphonies (1955, 1968, 1982, 1991) and a ballet, Cipollino (1973), as well as various other orchestral works and music for the theater and films.

Rhythmic drive and a careful and idiomatic use of his instrumental forces characterize his compositions. He adopted a primarily tonal approach to composition. His works have been recorded by artists including David Oistrakh, Jascha Heifetz, Mstislav Rostropovich, and Vladimir Yampolsky. A recording of the opening of his first symphony was played in a lecture-demonstration given at the University of Warwick during the first academic year in which it had undergraduates (1965–1966), by Geoffrey Bush.

From 1952 to 2011 he taught at the Moscow Conservatory (since 1981 - professor). Among his students were A. Tchaikovsky, Alfred Schnittke, Sofia Gubaidulina, A. Baltin, A. Vieru (Romania), N. Terahara (Japan), Kang San U (PRC), V. Babushkin, V. Polyansky, Ashot Ariyan and many others.

== Works ==
- String trio for violin, viola, and cello
- Violin Sonata, in G minor, Op. 1 composed in 1947. (for Leonid Kogan) – recorded by J. Heifetz and L. Steuber for RCA Victor Gold in 1966. n. of disc is – (GD87872)
- Cello Sonata, dedicated to Mstislav Rostropovich. First performed January 10, 1967
- String quartet.
- Trio for Violin, Horn and Piano (OCLC 225728893)
- 4 symphonies (as noted above)
- Viy
- Cipollino, ballet in 3 acts (1973)

== Awards ==
Khachaturian was awarded the Order "For Merit to the Fatherland", 4th class (2007), the Order of Honour (2000) and the Order of Friendship (1995). He was awarded the title People's Artist of the RSFSR (1981) and the USSR State Prize (1976, for the ballet "Cipollino") and the State Prize of the Russian Federation (2001). He also received the Diploma of the Russian Federation President (6 March 2011 – for great contribution to the development of national culture and the many years of creative activity) and the Moscow City Hall prize (1999).
