= Horn Trio (Brahms) =

1865 composition by Johannes Brahms

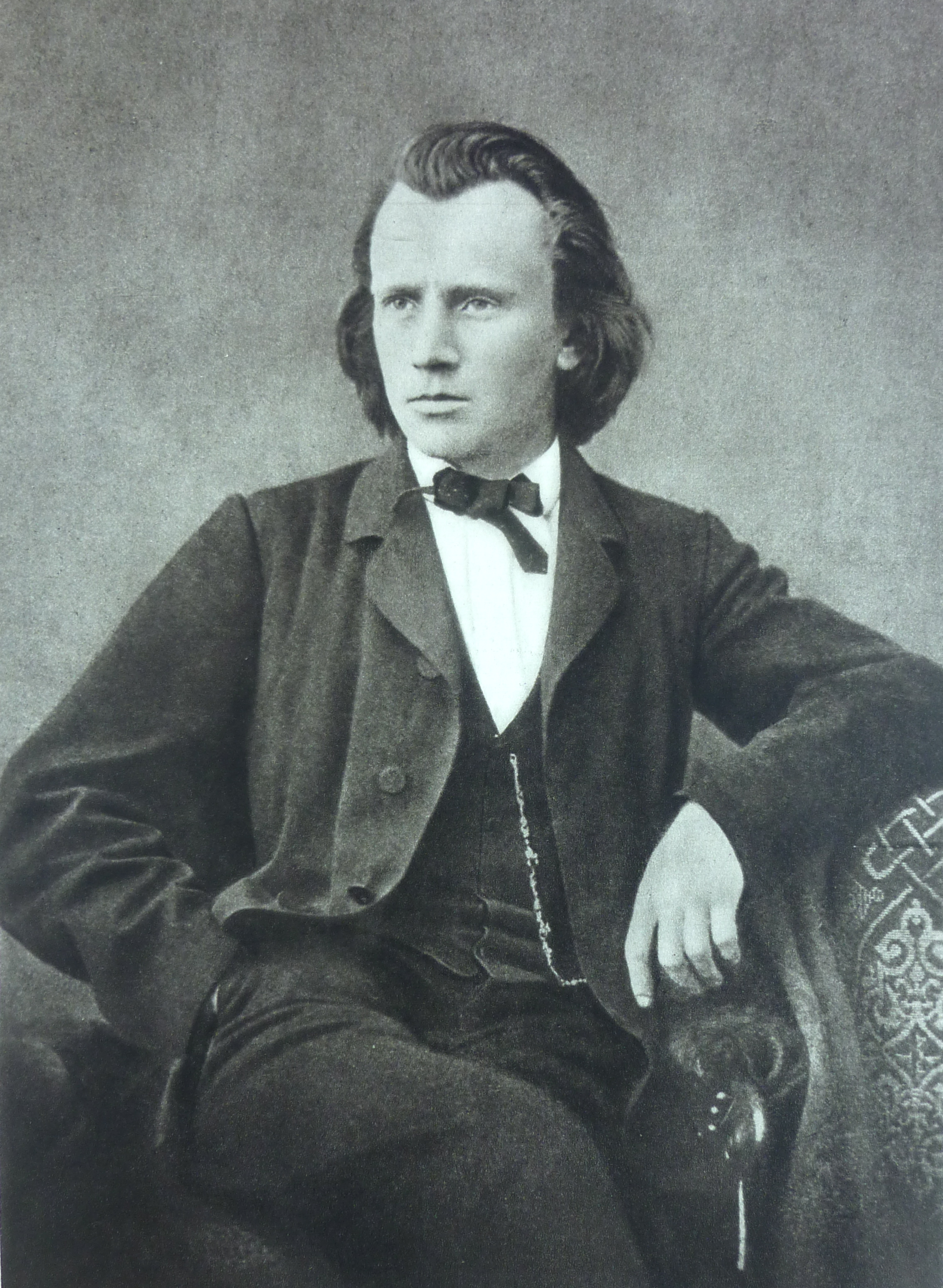
Johannes Brahms c. 1866

The Horn Trio in E♭ major, Op. 40, by Johannes Brahms is a chamber piece in four movements written for natural horn, violin, and piano. Composed in 1865, the work commemorates the death of Brahms's mother, Christiane, earlier that year. However, it draws on a theme which Brahms had composed twelve years previously but did not publish at the time.

The work was first performed in Zurich on November 28, 1865, and was published a year later in November 1866. The Horn Trio was the last chamber piece Brahms wrote for the next eight years.

== The natural horn ==
Brahms chose to write the work for natural horn rather than valve horn despite the fact that the valve horn was becoming more common. The timbre of the natural horn is more somber and melancholic than the valve horn and creates a much different mood. Brahms himself believed that the open tones of the natural horn had a fuller quality than those produced by valves. Nineteenth-century listeners associated the sound of the natural horn with nature and the calls of the hunt. Fittingly, Brahms once said that the opening theme of the first movement came to him while he was walking through the woods. Brahms also learned natural horn (as well as piano and cello) as a child, which may be another reason why he chose to write for these instruments following the death of his mother.

Notwithstanding Brahms's love for the sound of the natural horn, he did specify that the horn part could be played by a cello and it was indeed published with a transposed cello part. Much later in 1884 Brahms also reworked the part for viola.

== Movements ==
The work is divided into four movements:

1. Andante
2. Scherzo (Allegro)
3. Adagio mesto
4. Allegro con brio

In the first movement, Brahms emphasizes the simplicity of the opening theme by abandoning the structure of sonata form in favour of three slow sections offset by two shorter, more rhapsodic segments. Brahms also deviates from classical practice by adopting a slow–fast–slow–fast order of movements, perhaps looking back to the old sonata da chiesa form. (Note: Swafford writes that this is the only first movement Brahms composed that is not in sonata form.)

The scherzo represents a lighter side of grief; since the work as a whole simulates the stages of mourning, the Scherzo serves as the reminder of happy memories. As in the first movement, Brahms uses the pitches of the E♭ overtone series to establish the theme. (This theme is found in some variation in every movement, most directly in the Finale.) The playfulness that the tempo suggests offers a break from the slow and somber surrounding movements. The contrasting trio section uses transposed material from a small unpublished piano piece (Albumblatt) which Brahms had written twelve years earlier, in 1853.

The Adagio mesto opens with four measures of solo piano in the low register of the instrument; this sets up the solemn, contemplative mood of the movement that is emphasized by the entrance of the violin and horn. Daniel Gregory Mason held the Adagio from the Horn Trio to be one of Brahms's most impassioned and heartfelt slow movements.

The Finale contains the main theme that is present in the previous three movements, but it is prominently displayed in E♭ major in a lively tempo. The joy felt in the Finale symbolizes the recovery at the end of mourning.

== Orchestration ==
In 2006 hornist Radek Baborák took part in the premiere of Miloš Bok's arrangement of the work as a concerto for horn (or viola, or cello), violin and orchestra.

== See also ==
- Horn trio
  - Trio for horn, violin, and piano (Banks)
  - Trio for horn, violin, and piano (Berkeley)
  - Horn Trio (Holbrooke) – an early twentieth-century work composed as a companion to Brahms's Horn Trio
  - Trio for Violin, Horn and Piano (Ligeti)
