= Raymond Hanson (composer) =

Australian composer

Raymond Charles Hanson
- Born: 23 November 1913; Sydney, Australia
- Died: 6 December 1976 (aged 63)
- Occupations: Composer, teacher

Raymond (Charles) Hanson AM (23 November 1913 – 6 December 1976) was an Australian composer and lecturer in composition at the NSW State Conservatorium of Music now known as the Sydney Conservatorium of Music. A highly regarded teacher and mentor to many prominent Australian musicians, such as Don Burrows, Larry Sitsky and Roger Woodward, Hanson himself was largely self-taught.

As a composer, Hanson was not a follower of prevailing trends, and consequently his music was unfashionable and ignored by many other composers. Late in life however, his distinctive personal style began to receive greater recognition, and since his death his work has been held in high esteem by some critics.

== Early years ==
Hanson was born in the Sydney suburb of Burwood on 23 November 1913, the youngest of five children to Australian-born railroad engineer William Hanson, and his English-born wife Lilian, née Bennett. The marriage broke up when Hanson was quite young. Hanson was sickly as a child, suffering from bronchial complaints and a recurring ear infection that left him almost deaf in his left ear. He began experimenting in musical composition from the age of eight, inspired by his older sister's piano practice. Hanson's mother brought him up as a Baptist, and though he later left the faith he retained a lifelong interest in spirituality.

Hanson attended Burwood Public and Fort Street High Schools, but left before completing his third year. He continued however to pursue piano lessons, aided by teacher Anne Spillane who kindly provided him with free lessons as his family was too poor to pay for them. He was thereby eventually able, in 1930 at the age of seventeen, to gain the Licentiate (piano) of the Associated Board of the Royal Schools of Music. From 1930 until the outbreak of World War II in 1939, he made a living by teaching piano and by working in a variety of menial jobs.

Hanson was able to give a number of recitals of his own compositions in the late 1930s, and had the opportunity to gain some formal training in composition after being awarded the Gordon Vickers Scholarship at the New South Wales State Conservatorium of Music. Unfortunately, his Conservatorium studies would last only two months before the war interrupted them.

He joined the Army in 1941, eventually rising to the rank of Sergeant in the Army Education Service. During the war he was exposed to, and developed a lasting interest in, jazz music, an interest that would come to have some influence on his own work. He left the Army in 1946.

== Teaching career ==
As the recipient of a Fellowship in Composition, Hanson after the war was able to resume his studies at the Conservatorium. Following a year of study which he undertook with Alex Burnard, the Conservatorium offered Hanson a place on the staff, and this he accepted. He became a teacher of Aural Training, in which he was considered something of an innovator, and later a lecturer in Harmony and Composition, Counterpoint and Aesthetics of Music. He was also active in curriculum development and assisted in the introduction of the Bachelor of Music Education degree.

As a teacher, Hanson was noted for a kind, thoughtful and unpretentious manner, which was appreciated by students, while his abilities and dedication were greatly respected. He became a teacher and mentor to many future Australian composers and musicians, such as Nigel Butterley, Richard Meale and Barry Conyngham, as well as to noted performers such as jazz clarinettist Don Burrows and piano virtuoso Roger Woodward. In addition to his work at the Conservatorium, he also gave private lessons, which not infrequently ended in long discussions about philosophy or politics.

=== Political activity ===
Hanson himself became active in political matters when, in the early 1950s, he joined the Australian Cultural Defence Movement which sought to protect Australian culture from being swamped by foreign influences, particularly the United States and Americanization. In the prevailing mood of the times however, the movement was painted as leftist and pro-communist, and quickly crumbled. Hanson believed that his association with this movement, along with his membership in the Australian-Soviet Friendship Society, was one of the factors that held back his professional career.

== Music ==
While his teaching abilities were widely acknowledged, Hanson struggled to gain recognition for his talents as a composer for much of his career, as his music was often unpopular with the audience at that time and also unfashionable. He was fifty-four years old before receiving his first commission for a piece of music, and many of his works lay unperformed for many decades. One champion of his music was the pianist Igor Hmelnitsky, who was also on the faculty at the Conservatorium. Part of the problem lay with his independence of mind. Hanson ignored prevailing trends in the pursuit of his own muse. In the 1940s and 1950s, his work was regarded by his Australian contemporaries as too avant-garde, but by the 1960s it was being dismissed as not avant-garde enough. Hanson's rejection of serialism, responsible for the latter dismissal, was ultimately vindicated by history, but this vindication came late in his career.

In 1971 he won the Albert H. Maggs Composition Award.

=== Style ===
Hanson's unique qualities as a composer were noticed early by English critic Neville Cardus, who perceived, after attending a concert featuring Hanson's works in 1941, "an originality that avoided Anglocentrism". His music has also been described as "of a style not usually associated with Australian composition". Hanson himself eschewed the notion of a uniquely "Australian" style, but some have nevertheless heard an "unmistakeable" influence of the Australian landscape in his works. Others, by contrast, have detected traces of English pastoralism.

Particularly crucial to Hanson were the compositions and the pedagogic theories of Paul Hindemith ("I still think Hindemith has the answers to so many things ... If you want to be incomprehensible, go and get it. I don't"). Another figure who had a powerful impact on Hanson's philosophy was the Indian poet and musician Rabindranath Tagore. Hanson's deep spirituality (he once considered becoming a missionary to India) played a notable part in his creative outlook. His appreciation of jazz is apparent in the sense of spontaneity and rhythmic fluidity that he strove to bring to his own pieces. He had a gift for improvisation and often composed directly at the keyboard.

Technically speaking, Hanson rejected serialism with its rigid rules of development, but retained a fascination with the twelve-note scale and its full potentialities. This should not be taken to indicate, however, that he disdained melody. On the contrary, he has been described as "a lyrical composer who thought naturally in evolving lines".

== Personal life ==
On 15 September 1956, Hanson at the age of 43 married a 23-year-old Conservatorium student, Moira Winifred Young, at St. Matthew's Anglican Church, Manly. The marriage was a very happy union despite the unconventionality of the age difference. The couple moved house several times over the next few years as prior to Hanson being placed on salary all teaching staff at the Con were contract players. Hanson's health deteriorated and in 1967 he suffered a heart attack. Young died in 1975, and after being appointed a Member of the Order of Australia (AM) in January 1976, Hanson himself died of myocardial infarction later that year, on 6 December. The couple were survived by three daughters.

During his life, Hanson sometimes commented on his pride in being born within 24 hours of the birth of his musical hero Benjamin Britten. His death, also, came only two days after Britten's.

== Works ==
Hanson left behind over 100 major works, including a symphony, four concertos, a ballet, an opera, an oratorio, cantatas, chamber works and piano music. He also wrote film, television and radio scores, as well as jazz music and arrangements.

More notable works include his 1948 Trumpet Concerto, released worldwide on the RCA label, the technically demanding Piano Sonata (composed between 1938 and 1941, and reflecting his feelings about the Fall of France), the piano Preludes, and his Violin Concerto. Hanson also set many of Tagore's poems to music, his most ambitious work in this regard being the 1976 oratorio The Immortal Touch. Many of Hanson's works, such as the Violin Concerto, went unperformed for many years, and his 1941 Piano Sonata was only finally published in 1976, on the day of his death.

=== Selected list of major works ===
Dramatic

Dhoogor (ballet), 1945
Three in One (film score), 1955
The Lost Child (radio or TV op), 1958
Surfing (film score), 1958
Captain Cook (Cook’s Voyage) (film score), 1959
Temptation (film score), 1960
Jane Greer (opera), 1964
Also other film scores

Orchestral

Violin Concerto, 1946
Novelette, 1947
Overture for a Royal Occasion, 1948
Trumpet Concerto, 1948
Symphony, 1952
Trombone Concerto, 1955
Gula, 1968
Movement "Homage to Alfred Hill", 1969
Piano Concerto, 1972
Fanfare, 1973

Vocal

I dreamt that she sat by my head (Tagore), for mezzo/baritone and piano, 1935
Fallen Veils (D.G. Rossetti), for soprano and piano, 1938
This is my delight (Tagore), soprano and piano, 1941
Spindrift (M. Memory), mezzo/baritone and piano, 1946
Do not keep to yourself (Tagore), voice and piano, 1952
My love, once upon a time (Tagore), 1960
The Web is Wove (T. Gray), 1968
Fern Hill (D. Thomas), violin and orchestra, 1969
The Immortal Touch (Tagore), violin and orchestra, 1976
Many others

Chamber and solo instrumental

Piano Sonata, 1938–40, revised 1963
Procrastination, piano, 1939
Violin Sonata, violin and piano, 1939
Quizzic, piano, 1940
Preludes, 1941
Flute Sonata, flute and piano, 1941
Idylle, 1942
Piano Quintet, 1944
Fancies, violin and piano, 1946
Legende, violin and piano, c1946
Episodes on Tarry Trowsers, piano, 1948
Five Portraits, piano, 1948
Piano Sonatina, 1949
Seascape, violin and piano, 1953
Sonatina, 1956
Still Winds, flute, guitar, double bass and vibraphone, 1956
String Quartet, 1967
An Etching, violin and piano, 1969
Divertimento, wind quintet, 1972
Dedication, 2 flutes, clarinet, 1973

== Recordings ==
- The Poet Sings, (Lisa Harper-Brown – soprano, David Wickham – piano), Stone Records 2012
