= Peter Sculthorpe =

Australian composer (1929–2014)

Peter Sculthorpe AO OBE FAHA

Background information
- Born: Peter Joshua Sculthorpe; 29 April 1929; Launceston, Tasmania, Australia
- Died: 8 August 2014 (aged 85) Sydney, New South Wales, Australia
- Genres: Opera, classical
- Occupation: Composer

Peter Joshua Sculthorpe AO OBE FAHA (29 April 1929 – 8 August 2014) was a distinguished Australian composer and music educator. Much of his music resulted from an interest in the music of countries neighbouring Australia, as well as from the impulse to bring together aspects of Aboriginal Australian music with that of the heritage of the West. He was known primarily for his orchestral and chamber music, such as Kakadu (1988) and Earth Cry (1986), which evoke the sounds and feeling of the Australian bushland and outback. He also wrote 18 string quartets, using unusual timbral effects, works for piano, and two operas. He stated that he wanted his music to make people feel better and happier for having listened to it. He typically avoided the dense, atonal techniques of many of his contemporary composers. His work was often characterised by its distinctive use of percussion. As one of the compositional pioneers of a distinctively Australian sound, Sculthorpe and his music have been likened to the role played by Aaron Copland in America's musical coming of age.

== Early life ==
Sculthorpe was born and raised in Launceston, Tasmania. His mother, Edna, was passionate about English literature and was the first woman to hold a driver's licence in Tasmania; his father, Joshua, loved fishing and nature. He was educated at the Launceston Church Grammar School.

He began writing music at the age of seven or eight, after having his first piano lesson, continuing in secret when his piano teacher punished him for this activity. By the age of 14, he had decided to make a career of music, despite many (especially his father) encouraging him to enter different fields, because young Sculthorpe felt the music he wrote was the only thing that was his own. In his early teens he attempted to learn composition through studying Ernst Krenek's Studies in Counterpoint – "a pretty dreadful book" as he later described it. He studied at the Melbourne Conservatorium of Music from 1946 to 1950, then returned to Tasmania.

His Piano Sonatina was performed at the ISCM Festival in Baden-Baden in 1955 (the piece had been rejected for an ABC competition because it was "too modern").

He won a scholarship to study at Wadham College, Oxford, studying under Egon Wellesz. Through Wellesz he met Wilfrid Mellers, whose wide literary interests included many Australian writers, and who recommended Sculthorpe read D. H. Lawrence's Kangaroo. This led directly to the composition of Irkanda II (String Quartet No. 5). His song-cycle Sun, based on three Lawrence poems, was dedicated to Mellers. These works were later withdrawn, but Lawrence's words returned in a revised version of Irkanda IV and in The Fifth Continent. He left Wadham before completing his doctorate because his father was gravely ill. He wrote his first mature composition, Irkanda IV, in his father's memory.

Shortly afterwards, he made the acquaintance of the painter Russell Drysdale, who had recently lost his son to suicide, and the pair shared a working holiday in a house on the Tamar River. Not long after this, Drysdale's wife Bonnie, who had introduced him to Sculthorpe, also took her own life. His String Quartet No. 6 was dedicated to Bonnie Drysdale's memory. His Piano Sonata (later withdrawn and re-released under the title Callabonna) was dedicated to Russell Drysdale, who used Lake Callabonna in South Australia as the backdrop to some of his paintings.

== Musical career ==
In 1963 he became a lecturer at the University of Sydney, and remained there more or less ever after, where he was an emeritus professor. In the mid-1960s he was composer in residence at Yale University. In 1965 he wrote Sun Music I for the Sydney Symphony Orchestra's first overseas tour, on a commission from Sir Bernard Heinze, who asked for "something without rhythm, harmony or melody". Neville Cardus, after the premiere of Sun Music I, wrote that Sculthorpe was set to "lay the foundations of an original and characteristic Australian music". In 1968 the Sun Music series was used for the ballet Sun Music, choreographed by Sir Robert Helpmann, which gained wide international attention. In the late 1960s, Sculthorpe worked with Patrick White on an opera about Eliza Fraser, but White chose to terminate the artistic relationship. Sculthorpe subsequently wrote an opera (music theatre), Rites of Passage (1972–73), to his own libretto, using texts in Latin and the Australian indigenous language Arrernte. Another opera Quiros followed in 1982.

In 2003, the SBS Radio and Television Youth Orchestra gave the premiere of Sydney Singing, a composition by Sculthorpe for clarinet solo (Joanne Sharp), harp solo (Tamara Spigelman), percussion solo (Peter Hayward) and string orchestra.

Sculthorpe was a represented composer of the Australian Music Centre and was published by Faber Music Ltd. He was only the second composer to be contracted by Faber, after Benjamin Britten.

== Style and themes ==
Much of Sculthorpe's early work demonstrates the influence of Asian music, but he said that these influences dwindled through the 1970s as Indigenous Australian music became more important. He said that he had been interested in indigenous cultures since his teens, mainly because of his father "who told me many stories of past wrongs in Tasmania. I think he was quite extraordinary for that time, as was my mother". However, it was only with the advent of recordings and books on the subject around the 1970s that he started to incorporate indigenous motifs in his work.

Sculthorpe said he was political in his work – and that his work had also always been about "the preservation of the environment and more recently, climate change". His 16th String Quartet was inspired by extracts from letters written by asylum seekers in Australian detention centres.

Sculthorpe came to regard Russell "Tass" Drysdale as a role model, admiring the way he reworked familiar material in new ways. He said "In later years he was often accused of painting the same picture over and over again. But his answer was that he was no different from a Renaissance artist, striving again and again to paint the perfect Madonna-and-Child. Since then, I've never had a problem about the idea of reusing and reworking my material. Like Tass, I've come to look on my whole output as one slowly emerging work".

== Personal life ==
In the early 1970s Sculthorpe was engaged to the Australian composer and music educator Anne Boyd.

He is distantly related to Fanny Cochrane Smith, a Tasmanian Aboriginal woman whose wax cylinder recordings of songs are the only audio recordings of any of Tasmania's Indigenous languages. Her daughter Gladys married Sculthorpe's great-grandfather's nephew.

== Recognition and honours ==
- 1999: made one of Australia's 45 Icons

=== Bernard Heinze Memorial Award ===
The Sir Bernard Heinze Memorial Award is given to a person who has made an outstanding contribution to music in Australia.

Year	Nominee / work	Award	Result	Ref.
1993	Peter Sculthorpe	Sir Bernard Heinze Memorial Award	awarded	

=== Don Banks Music Award ===
The Don Banks Music Award was established in 1984 to publicly honour a senior artist of high distinction who has made an outstanding and sustained contribution to music in Australia. It was founded by the Australia Council in honour of Don Banks, Australian composer, performer and the first chair of its music board.

Year	Nominee / work	Award	Result
2007	Peter Sculthorpe	Don Banks Music Award	awarded

=== Australian Academy of the Humanities ===
Sculthorpe was elected a Fellow of the Australian Academy of the Humanities (FAHA) in 1991.

== Death and legacy ==
Sculthorpe died in Sydney on 8 August 2014 at the age of 85. His home in Holdsworth St, Woollahra was sold in May 2015 to the fashion identity and philanthropist Peter Weiss.

=== Peter Sculthorpe Fellowship ===
In 2014, the Government of New South Wales and the Sydney Conservatorium announced a new award worth A$30,000 to honour Sculthorpe's life. The Peter Sculthorpe Fellowship would be offered biennially to support the career of an emerging composer or instrumentalist based in New South Wales who performs and produces new Australian music.

Winners

- 2015: Peggy Polias, a composer from south-west Sydney, enabling her record her 2009 piece, Picnic at Hanging Rock Suite; compose a new work; and broaden her professional development opportunities
- 2017: Rhyan Clapham (known professionally as DOBBY), Aboriginal Australian/ Filipino hip hop artist from Brewarrina, then aged 23

== Works ==
=== Orchestral ===
- The Fifth Continent for speaker and orchestra (1963)
- Sun Music I (1965)
- Sun Music II (1969)
- Sun Music III (1967)
- Sun Music IV (1967)
- Love 200 (a collaboration with Tully) (1970)
- Music for Japan (1970)
- Love 200 (a collaboration with Fraternity (1972)
- Small Town for solo oboe, two trumpets, timpani and strings (1976) (see Thirroul, New South Wales)
- Port Essington for string trio and string orchestra (1977) (see Port Essington)
- Mangrove (1979)
- Earth Cry (1986)
- Kakadu (1988)
- Memento Mori (1993)
- Cello Dreaming (1998)
- From Oceania (2003)
- Beethoven Variations (2006)
- Songs of Sea and Sky, also arranged for different instruments such as flute and clarinet
- Mangrove, for orchestra
- My Country Childhood
- Shining Island (2011), for strings (remembering Henryk Górecki)

=== Concertante ===
- Piano Concerto (1983)
- Earth Cry, for didgeridoo and orchestra (1986)
- Nourlangie, for solo guitar, strings and percussion (1989)
- Sydney Singing, for clarinet, harp, percussion, and strings (2003)
- Elegy, for solo viola and strings (2006)

=== Vocal/choral ===
- Morning Song for the Christ Child (1966)
- The Birthday of thy King (1988)
- Requiem (2004)

=== Opera ===
- Rites of Passage (music theatre; 1972–73)
- Quiros (1982)

=== Chamber/instrumental ===
- Sonata for Viola and Percussion (1960)
- Requiem for cello alone (1979; commissioned and premiered by Nathan Waks)
- Four Little Pieces for Piano Duet (1979)
- Djilile for percussion ensemble (1986)
- Djilile for viol consort (1995)
- From Kakadu for solo guitar (1993)
- Into the Dreaming for solo guitar (1994)
- Earth Cry arr. for string quartet (1994)
- From the River for piano and strings (2000)
- Soliloquy and Cadenza for solo cello (2001)
- Oh T.I. for guitar and strings (2012; commissioned and premiered by Canberra International Music Festival)
- 18 string quartets (including 4 quartets with optional didgeridoo – No. 12 "From Ubirr", No. 14 "Quamby", No. 16, No. 18)

=== Piano ===
- Between Five Bells
- Callabonna (1963)
- Djilile (1989)
- Koto Music I (1973)
- Koto Music II (1976)
- A Little Book of Hours
- Little Passacaglia (2004, written for the Indonesian pianist Ananda Sukarlan)
- Mountains (1981, premiered by Gabriella Pusner)
- Night Pieces: Snow; Moon; Flowers; Night; Stars (1971)
- Nocturnal (1989)
- Piano Sonatina (1954)
- Riverina
- Rose Bay Quadrilles (William Stanley, 1856, edited by Sculthorpe)
- Song for a Penny (2000)
- Simori
- Thoughts from Home (intended to form part of the Gallipoli Symphony for Anzac Day 2015)
- Two Easy Pieces: Left Bank Waltz (1958); Sea Chant (1971)

=== Film soundtracks ===
- Age of Consent (1969)
- Manganinnie (1980) – Winner AFI Award, Best Original Music Score
- Burke & Wills (1985)

=== Recordings ===
Sculthorpe Complete String Quartets with didgeridoo (Del Sol String Quartet with Stephen Kent, didgeridoo) (released by Sono Luminus on 30 September 2014)

Tamara Anna Cislowska released the album Peter Sculthorpe – Complete Works for Solo Piano in September 2014.
