= Yiorgo Moutsiaras =

Dutch conductor (born 1976)

Yiorgo Moutsiaras (Greek: Γιώργος Μουτσιάρας; born 1976) is a Greek orchestral conductor living in Delft since October 2005. He is conducting the Filharmonisch Orkest ’s-Hertogenbosch -an orchestra in 's-Hertogenbosch, the Netherlands.

== Life ==
Moutsiaras was born in Volos, Greece, as the son of Kostas Moutsiaras and Virginia Barouta- Moutsiara. He attended schools in Greece successfully and studied piano and theory of music from 1983 until 1999. During serving his military service in the Greek Air Force he was a member of the 114th's and 111th Combat Wing's military orchestras.

Diplomas

- Academy for Music and Dance of Rotterdam (CODARTS) in March 2003, orchestral conducting
- Conservatory of Maastricht (Hogeschool Zuyd) in June 2004, orchestral conducting
- Lemmens Institute (Hogeschool voor Wetenschap en Kunst) in Leuven in September 2006 in orchestral conducting
- 1st Detmold Summer Academy’s classes in September 2004, with Kurt Masur

== Works ==
Yiorgo Moutsiaras is rumored to be currently in a project of rearranging, exclusive for classic orchestra, Greek traditional music (rembetika) like Tsitsanis, since 2009.
