= Kakadu (Sculthorpe) =

Kakadu (1988) is a composition for orchestra by Peter Sculthorpe. It is one of the broad landscape compositions for which the composer is best known. Sculthorpe used his knowledge of the World Heritage listed Kakadu National Park from studying photographs and listening to recordings of Northern Australian Aboriginal music.

== Conception ==
The composer explained the way he conceived Kakadu thus:

The work takes its name from the Kakadu National Park in northern Australia. This enormous wilderness area stretches from coastal tidal plains to rugged mountain plateaux, and in it may be found the living culture of its Aboriginal inhabitants, dating back for fifty thousand years. Sadly, today there are only a few remaining speakers of kakadu or gagadju. The work, then, is concerned with my feelings about this place, its landscape, its change of seasons, its dry season and its wet, its cycle of life and death. In three parts, the outer sections are dance-like and energetic, sharing similar musical ideas. The central section is somewhat introspective, and is dominated by a cor anglais solo. ... Apart from this solo, the melodic material in Kakadu, as in much of my recent music, was suggested by the contours and rhythms of Aboriginal chant.

— Peter Sculthorpe,

Sculthorpe also used some material from his earlier works Djilile (1986) and Manganinnie (1980).

== Instrumentation ==
The music is scored for two flutes, two clarinets, two oboes, a cor anglais, two bassoons, a contrabassoon, four French horns, four trumpets, two tenor trombones, a bass trombone, a tuba, a timpani, three percussive parts, and strings. A didjeridu part was later written in 2003 for a recording by the Queensland Symphony Orchestra.

Kakadu notably features some sections with no key signature due to the abnormally chromatic nature of these sections.

== Commission and performance ==
The work was commissioned by Emanuel Papper as a present for his wife upon her birthday and first performed by the Aspen Festival Orchestra, under Jorge Mester on 24 July 1988. It was voted number 51 in the 2011 ABC's Classic 100 Twentieth Century countdown.

The Australian premiere was given by the Melbourne Symphony Orchestra to celebrate Sculthorpe's 60th birthday in April 1989.
