= Eucalyptus gigantangion =

Kakadu woollybutt

Conservation status
- Least Concern (IUCN 3.1)

Scientific classification
- Kingdom: Plantae
- Clade: Tracheophytes
- Clade: Angiosperms
- Clade: Eudicots
- Clade: Rosids
- Order: Myrtales
- Family: Myrtaceae
- Genus: Eucalyptus
- Species: E. gigantangion

Binomial name
- Eucalyptus gigantangion L.A.S.Johnson & K.D.Hill

Species of eucalyptus

Eucalyptus gigantangion, commonly known as Kakadu woollybutt, is a species of tree that is endemic to the Northern Territory. It has soft, fibrous bark most of the trunk, smooth white bark above, narrow lance-shaped adult leaves, flower buds in groups of seven, orange-coloured flowers and ribbed, urn-shaped fruit.

== Description ==
Eucalyptus gigantangion is a tree that typically grows to a height of 30 metres (98 ft) and forms a lignotuber. It has rough but soft, fibrous, orange-brown to red-brown, dark grey or black bark over most of the trunk with the upper trunk and branches covered with smooth white bark. Young plants and coppice regrowth have broadly lance-shaped to egg-shaped leaves that are 55–110 mm (2.2–4.3 in) long and 25–50 mm (0.98–1.97 in) wide. Adult leaves are arranged alternately, dull green to blue-green but lighter on one side, narrow lance-shaped, 60–160 mm (2.4–6.3 in) long and 10–20 mm (0.39–0.79 in) wide, the base tapering to a petiole 10–20 mm (0.39–0.79 in) long.

The flower buds are arranged in groups of seven on a peduncle 18–25 mm (0.71–0.98 in) long, the individual buds more or less sessile. Mature buds are spindle-shaped, 22–28 mm (0.87–1.10 in) long and 10–14 mm (0.39–0.55 in) wide with ribs on the sides, four small teeth at the tip, and a conical operculum. Flowering occurs from July to August and the flowers are orange. The fruit is a woody urn-shaped capsule 35–58 mm (1.4–2.3 in) long and 22–50 mm (0.87–1.97 in) wide with ribs on the sides and the valve enclosed below rim level.

== Taxonomy and naming ==
Eucalyptus gigantangion was first formally described in 1991 by the botanists Lawrie Johnson and Ken Hill in the journal Telopea. The specific epithet (gigantangion) "is derived from the Ancient Greek words gigas, gigantos, a giant and aggeion (usually transliterated as angion), a vessel or receptacle, from the extremely large fruits".

== Distribution and habitat ==
Kakadu woollybutt grows in savanna forests with Triodia and shrubs in the understorey. It is found near the upper edge of sandstone cliffs on the Arnhem Land escarpment, mostly only in Kakadu National Park.

== See also ==
- List of Eucalyptus species
