= Cockatoo and Lapwing =

1920 film

- Scene from a film
- German: Kakadu und Kiebitz
- Directed by: Erich Schönfelder
- Written by: Erich Schönfelder; Tyll Uhl
- Produced by: Paul Davidson
- Starring: Ossi Oswalda; Victor Janson; Marga Köhler
- Cinematography: Franz Meinecke; Georg Muschner
- Production company: PAGU
- Distributed by: UFA
- Release date: 13 August 1920
- Country: Germany
- Languages: Silent; German intertitles

Cockatoo and Lapwing (German: Kakadu und Kiebitz) is a 1920 German silent film directed by Erich Schönfelder and starring Ossi Oswalda, Victor Janson, and Marga Köhler.

== Cast ==
- Ossi Oswalda as Ossi Schönbeck
- Hans Brockmann as Hans Reimers, Doctor of Zoology
- Marga Köhler as Frau Sturm
- Victor Janson as Schlappi Mappi, Boxer
- Rudolf Senius as Theodor Stänker, Editor of The Lie
- Willi Allen as Fritz, Girls for Everything
- Hans Junkermann as Idi Ot, Hysteria painter
