= Brenton Langbein =

Australian violinist, conductor and composer (1928–1993)

Brenton Langbein AO
- Langbein in 1943
- Born: Brenton James Langbein; 21 January 1928; Gawler, South Australia, Australia
- Died: 6 June 1993 (aged 65); Zürich, Switzerland
- Occupations: Violinist; Conductor; Composer
- Organizations: Basel Chamber Orchestra; Die Kammermusiker Zürich; Adelaide Chamber Orchestra

Brenton James Langbein (21 January 1928 – 6 June 1993) was an Australian violinist, conductor, and composer.

== Life ==
Langbein was born on 21 January 1928, in the South Australian town of Gawler, to James Langbein, an accomplished pianist who had set up a car dealership and garage business in the town, and his second wife, Juanita Zadow. His parents were of German and Scottish ancestry, his father's grandfather, Joachim Heinrich Gottfried Langbein, having arrived in South Australia from Mecklenburg in 1845. He began learning violin at age five from Sister Mary Ludovic at the teaching Sisters of the Good Samaritan Convent, Gawler, where he was educated. He also studied piano under Adele Wiebusch, who additionally supervised his daily music practice at school when he was a child. He gave his first local public performance at the age of five-and-a-half and his first recital aged seven. By 1936, when he was eight, he was travelling to Adelaide weekly for violin lessons with Sylvia Whitington at the Elder Conservatorium of Music. In that year, he gave a recital there on both violin and piano, including his own compositions, among which was a cradle song for his baby sister. At age nine he won a Eugene Alderman Scholarship for a further three years' tuition at the Conservatorium, where he was taught by Ludwig Schwab, and began to perform with the Adelaide Symphony Orchestra at age fourteen. He attended Gawler High School and graduated from the University of Adelaide with a Bachelor of Music. In 1948, he moved to Sydney, where he performed as a soloist and as a member of the Sydney Symphony Orchestra and studied composition with Sir Eugene Goosens.

He moved to Switzerland in 1951 to study with Paul Grümmer; during this period, he was also taught by Pablo Casals and spent six weeks studying in Vienna with Ernst Morawec. In 1953, he settled in Zürich, where he became a member of Paul Sacher's Collegium Musicum Zürich chamber orchestra in 1954 and its concertmaster two years after that; he later became the concertmaster of Sacher's Basel Chamber Orchestra. He was appointed Professor of Violin at the City of Basel Music Academy, and formed a duo with Australian pianist Maureen Jones and then a trio with fellow Australian horn player Barry Tuckwell. In the 1960s, he founded Die Kammermusiker Zürich, a chamber orchestra that performed music by little-known and contemporary composers, along with youth orchestra schools in Zürich and Basel.

He was the soloist at the premiere of Hans Werner Henze's Violin Concerto No. 2, which was dedicated to Langbein, at the 1972 Adelaide Festival and co-founded Opera Factory later in the 1970s. He was the musical director of the Adelaide Chamber Orchestra and co-founded the Barossa Festival, a chamber music festival in South Australia's Barossa Valley, in 1990.

Langbein gave his last concert in Siena, Italy, in early April 1993. He died of cancer in Zürich on 6 June of that year, aged 65, and is buried in the Barossa Valley town of Lyndoch.

== Recognition and legacy ==
Langbein received an award of honour from the Canton of Zürich in 1983 and the Nägeli Medal from the City of Zürich, an award for musicians that he had co-founded, in 1988. In the 1986 Queen's Birthday Honours he was made an Officer of the Order of Australia (AO) for service to music. The Brenton Langbein Theatre, part of the Barossa Convention Centre in Tanunda, is named after him, as is the Langbein String Quartet, run by the Firm, a South Australian contemporary music organisation. Hans Werner Henze wrote a solo viola composition, An Brenton, as a tribute to Langbein shortly after his death. The Swiss composer Hermann Haller wrote his very last work, Blätterfall..., written for the Kammermusiker Zürich, "to the memory of Brenton Langbein". His papers and other ephemera were donated to the Mortlock Library at the State Library of South Australia.

Among Langbein's compositions, a string quintet has been recorded. His only composition with an opus number is his Prelude, Marche & Valse, Op. 1. Manuscripts of his compositions are among his papers at the State Library of South Australia.
