= Egbert Jan Louwerse =

Dutch flautist

Egbert Jan Louwerse (1975) is a flautist from the Netherlands. He is a professor of flute at the Prince Claus Conservatoire Groningen, part of the Hanze University, Groningen.

He studied with Pieter Odé and Marieke Schneemann at the Conservatory of Amsterdam where he graduated specialising in contemporary music. During his studies he also did courses in conducting, live electronics and composing. He also studied the microtonal systems and rhythmical complexity of South Indian Music. After graduation at highest possible level in Amsterdam, he went to France many times to study there with flute-legend Christian Lardé.

Although occasionally he works for several orchestra's, his love for chamber music kept growing, especially for French chamber music. In this important repertoire for the flute, he researched several elements in notation-forms in music from 1870, connected to the famous musician Paul Taffanel, which had led to another master's degree on this topic in 2017.

In 2015, he was awarded, by the Paris-based Société Academique "Arts-Sciences-Lettres", a Diploma de medaille d'Argent (a silver medal) for his work on French music throughout his career. Because of this remarkable decoration, the Hanze University Groningen enlisted him on 26 May 2016 in its "Walk of Fame".

Louwerse is regularly invited to lecture and give masterclasses at festivals and conservatories in the Netherlands, Spain, Belgium, Italy and China and is often seen as a jury-member in competitions.

He has duos with pianist Henry Kelder and harpist Manja Smits. He is part of the Dutch flutequartet and fluteoctet Blow Up!.

As a composer he has a contract with Domenus Publishing House of Contemporary Classical Music.
