= Trio for Violin, Horn and Piano (Ligeti) =

- Hommage à Brahms
- by György Ligeti
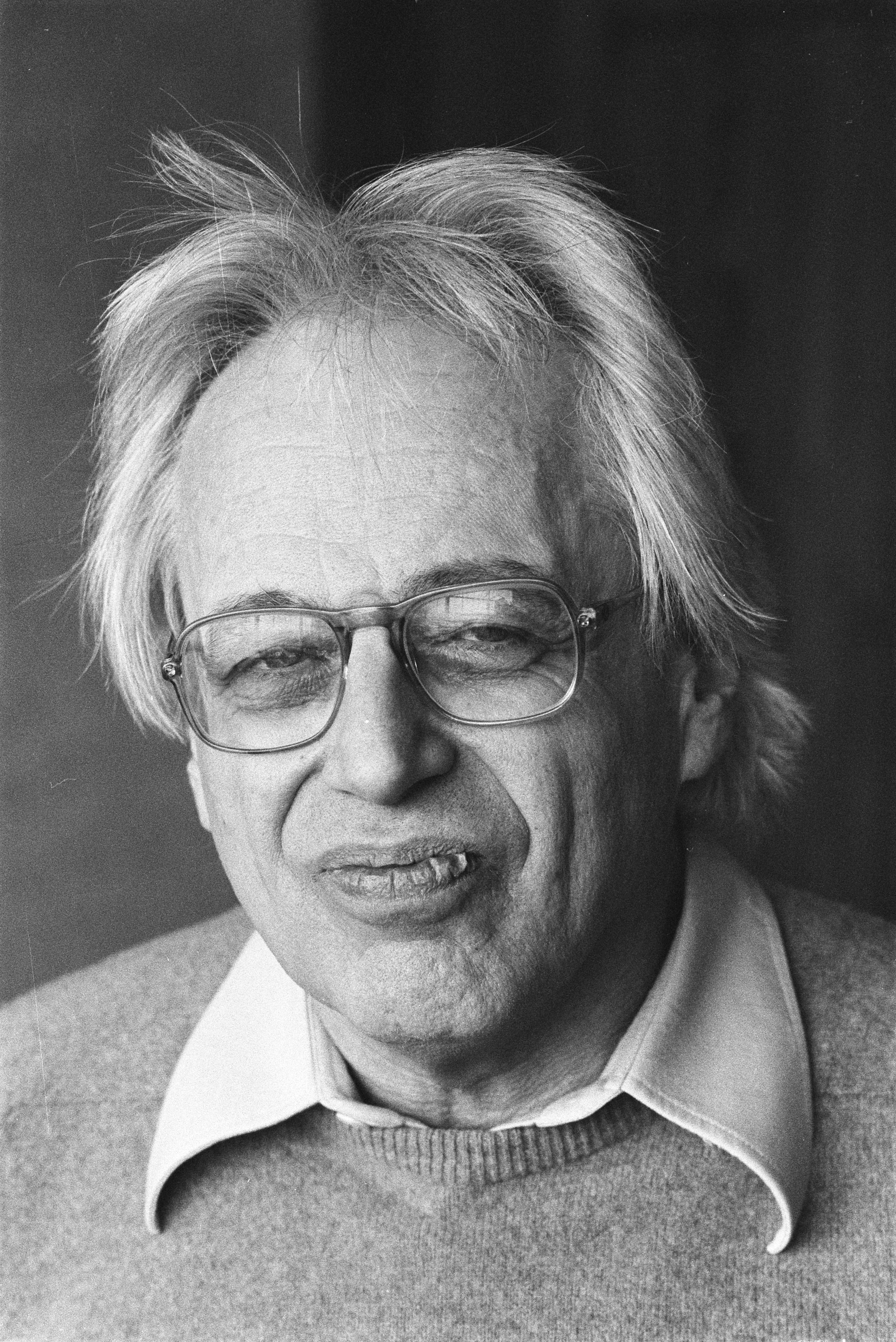
- György Ligeti in 1984
- Form: Horn trio
- Composed: 1982
- Duration: About 21 minutes
- Movements: Four

Premiere
- Date: 7 August 1982
- Location: Bergedorf Castle, Hamburg
- Performers: Saschko Gawriloff (violin); Hermann Baumann (horn); Eckart Besch (piano)

The Trio for Violin, Horn and Piano by György Ligeti was completed in 1982. The piece was a turning point in Ligeti’s career. Ligeti had composed little since he completed his opera, Le Grand Macabre, in 1977, having only finished a few smaller pieces, like Hungarian Rock (chaconne) and Passacaglia ungherese for harpsichord. Influenced by sources as diverse as sub-Saharan African drumming, the music of Conlon Nancarrow, and the piano music of Chopin and Schumann, the Trio is considered to be the watershed moment that opened up his "third way," a style that Ligeti claimed to be neither modern nor postmodern.

Ligeti wrote the Trio at the suggestion of pianist Eckart Besch as a companion to Johannes Brahms' Horn Trio, one of the few other examples in the genre, which is why the Ligeti Trio is marked Hommage à Brahms. Ligeti recalled his reaction to the suggestion: "[a]s soon as he pronounced the word 'horn' somewhere inside my head I heard the sound of a horn as if coming from a distant forest in a fairy tale, just as in a poem by Eichendorff."

== Analysis ==
The Trio is in four movements:

1. Andantino con tenerezza
2. Vivacissimo molto ritmico
3. Alla marcia
4. Lamento. Adagio

A performance of the piece lasts about 21 minutes.

The composition explores the use of major and minor harmonies as free sonorities without following established patterns of common practice tonality. In addition, it explores the natural just intonation of the upper partials available on the horn, asymmetric Bulgarian rhythms in the second movement, and the Ligeti lamento motif in the fourth movement. The first three movements are each in a ternary form – a notable look back towards traditional forms. The final movement is an example of a passacaglia using as its ground bass a similar theme as that of the opening movement. It has been pointed out that the opening theme of the first movement is reminiscent of the opening theme of Beethoven's Piano Sonata No. 26, "Les Adieux".
