= Horn Trio (Holbrooke) =

Joseph Holbrooke's Horn Trio in D minor, Op. 28, (Note: Stevenson notes that contemporary publications listed this work as Op.24, 25, 36 & 37.) is a chamber composition for a trio consisting of horn, violin and piano. Conceived as a companion piece to Brahms's Horn Trio Op. 40, the work was composed no earlier than 1904 and revised by the composer between 1906 and 1912.

== Structure ==
The composition is structured in three movements:

1. Larghetto sostenuto – Allegro con brio
2. Adagio non troppo
3. Rondo: Molto vivace

A typical performance takes around 27 to 30 minutes.
