= 1837 in music =

List of years in music	(table)
- … 1827; 1828; 1829; 1830; 1831; 1832; 1833; 1834; 1835; 1836; 1837; 1838; 1839; 1840; 1841; 1842; 1843; 1844; 1845; 1846; 1847 …
- Art; Archaeology; Architecture; Literature; Music; Philosophy; Science; +...

This article is about music-related events in 1837.

== Events ==
- March 31 – Franz Liszt and Sigismond Thalberg play a musical 'duel' at a charity event for refugees of the Italian war of independence at the home of Countess Belgiojoso.
- June 11 – Prussian Copyright Act protecting for the first time performances of concert music
- Pauline Viardot (as Pauline García) makes her concert debut at the age of sixteen.

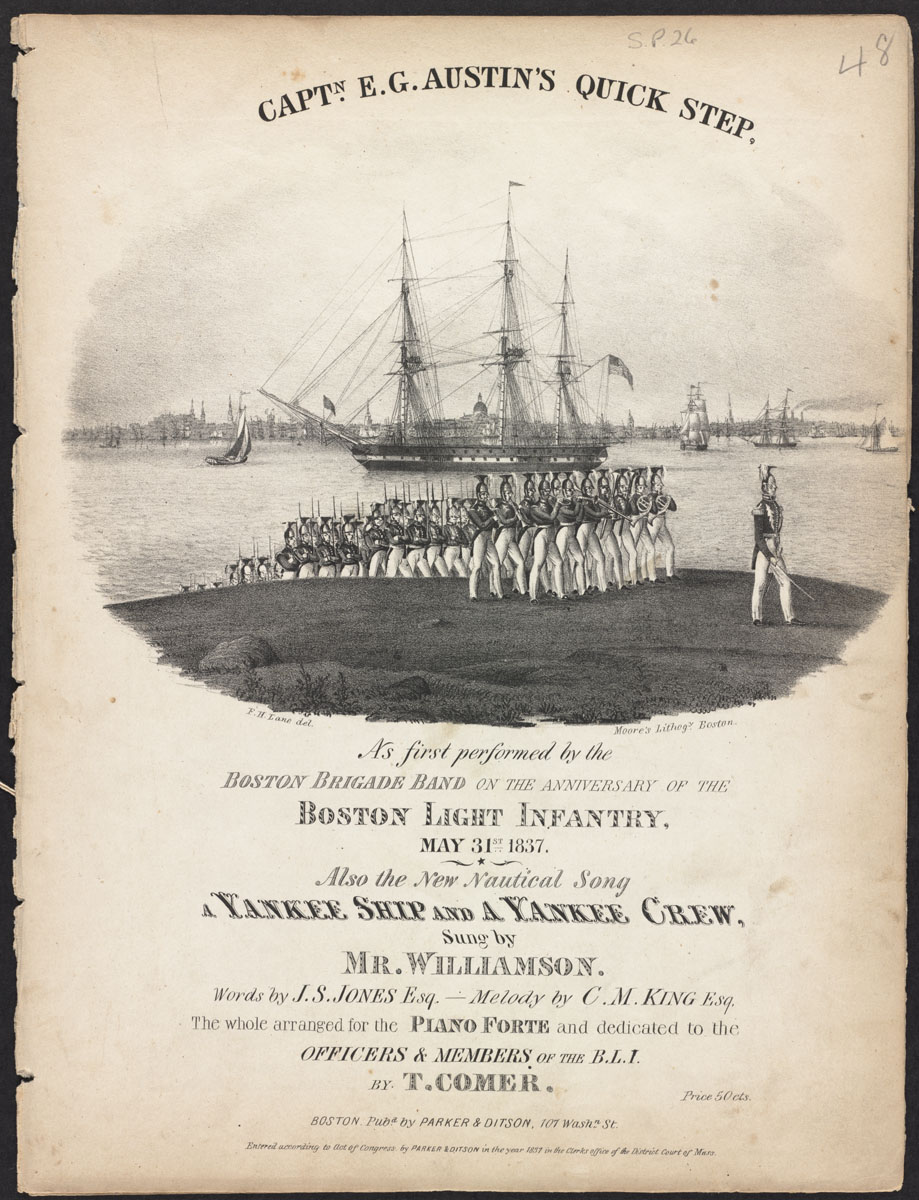
Captain E. G. Austin's Quick Step

== Publications ==
- François-Joseph Fétis – Traité du chant en choeur (Paris)

== Published popular music ==
- "Hark, Brothers, Hark", words and music by John Hill Hewitt
- "Woodman, Spare That Tree!", words by George Pope Morris, music by Henry Russell

== Classical music ==
- Charles-Valentin Alkan – 3 Morceaux dans le genre pathétique, Op. 15
- Ludwig Berger – 15 Etudes, Op.33
- Charles-Auguste de Bériot – Violin Concerto No. 1, Op.16
- Hector Berlioz – Grande Messe des Morts
- Frédéric Chopin
  - Hexaméron: Variation No. 6
  - Nocturne in C minor, B. 108
  - Largo in E-flat major, B. 109
  - Impromptu No. 1, Op. 29
  - Scherzo No. 2, Op. 31
  - Piano Sonata No. 2, Op. 35, III
- Fanny Ellsler – 3 Airs de Ballet
- Adolf von Henselt
  - Romance, Op. 10
  - Variations de concert sur le motif de l'opéra 'L'elisir d'amore', Op. 1
- Franz Liszt
  - Grandes études, S. 137
  - Album d'un voyageur, S. 156
  - Hexaméron, S. 392
  - Soirées musicales de Rossini, S. 424
  - 12 Lieder von Franz Schubert, S. 558
- Felix Mendelssohn
  - 6 Gesänge, Op.34
  - Piano Concerto No. 2 in D minor, Op. 40
  - Psalm 42 for choir and orchestra, Op. 42
  - 6 Lieder, Op. 50
  - String Quartet No. 4 in E minor
- Carl Gottlieb Reissiger
  - 3 String Quartets, Op.111
  - 4 Gesänge, Op.117
- Robert Schumann
  - Davidsbündlertänze, Op. 6
  - Études symphoniques, Op. 13
- Johann Strauss Sr. – Cachucha-Galopp, Op.97
- Sigismond Thalberg
  - 12 Etudes, Op.26
  - Grand Fantasia on 'God save the Queen' and 'Rule Britannia', Op.27

== Opera ==
- Daniel Auber – The Black Domino (with libretto by Eugène Scribe)
- Gaetano Donizetti – Roberto Devereux
- Mikhail Glinka – Ruslan and Lyudmila (composition began, premiered in 1842)
- Albert Lortzing – Zar und Zimmermann
- Gaspare Spontini – Agnes von Hohenstaufen

== Births ==
- January 2 – Mily Balakirev, Russian pianist, conductor and composer (d. 1910)
- January 12 – Adolf Jensen, German pianist, composer and music teacher (d. 1879)
- January 27 – Carlotta Ferrari, composer (died 1907)
- February 23 – Rosalía de Castro, lyricist (died 1885)
- March 12 – Alexandre Guilmant, organist (died 1911)
- March 15 – Célestine Galli-Marié, operatic mezzo-soprano, the original Carmen (d. 1905)
- April 13 – Julius Weissenborn, German bassoonist, music teacher and composer (d. 1888)
- April 18 – Armand Silvestre, librettist (died 1901)
- May 23 – Józef Wieniawski, pianist (died 1912)
- June 1 – Ferdinand Quentin Dulcken, English (later American) pianist and composer (d. 1901)
- June 25 – Josef Werner, composer (died 1922)
- July 6 – Władysław Żeleński, composer (died 1921)
- July 30 – Signe Hebbe, operatic soprano (d. 1925)
- August 24
  - Théodore Dubois, organist and composer (d. 1924)
  - Adolf Wilbrandt, writer and lyricist (died 1911)
- September 19 – Adolf Gustaw Sonnenfeld, composer (died 1914)
- December 7 – Édouard Mangin, musician (died 1907)
- December 9 – Emile Waldteufel, pianist and composer (d. 1915)
- December 24 – Cosima Wagner, daughter of Franz Liszt and wife of Richard Wagner (d. 1930)
- December 30 – Ida Marie Lipsius, music writer (d. 1927)
- date unknown
  - Fred Godfrey, English bandmaster and music arranger (d. 1882)
  - Kate Santley, actress and singer (d. 1923)
  - La Serneta, flamenco singer (d. 1910)

== Deaths ==
- January 23 – John Field, pianist and composer (b. 1782)
- February 10 – Aleksandr Pushkin, Russian poet and librettist (born 1799)
- April 9 – Polly Cuninghame, ballet dancer (b. c. 1785)
- May 5
  - Niccolò Antonio Zingarelli, composer (b. 1752)
  - Salvatore Fighera, composer (b. 1771)
- June 16 – Valentino Fioravanti, opera buffa composer (b. 1764)
- July 28 – Joseph Schubert, violinist and composer (b. 1754)
- August 6 – Johann Nepomuk Schelble, composer (b. 1789)
- October 6 – Jean François Lesueur, composer (b. 1760/1763)
- October 11 – Samuel Wesley, organist and composer, son of hymn-writer Charles Wesley
- October 17 – Johann Nepomuk Hummel, composer (b. 1778)
- October 28 – Jean-Blaise Martin, opera singer (b. 1768)
- date unknown
  - Franz Joseph Antony, organist and choral composer (b. 1790)
  - Jean Théodore Latour, composer for piano (b. 1766)
  - Christina Rahm, opera singer (b. c. 1760)
