= 1827 in music =

This article is about music-related events in 1827.

== Events ==
- March 29 – The funeral of Ludwig van Beethoven is attended by huge crowds.
- April 5 – Pope Leo XII honours Niccolò Paganini with the Order of the Golden Spur.
- April 13 – 18-year-old soprano Eugenia Savorani marries Giovanni Tadolini, her 42-year-old singing teacher.
- date unknown
  - Franz Liszt moves to Paris after the death of his father. He will live there for the next five years. He plays a concert in London that was attended by Ignaz Moscheles.
  - François Dauverné becomes one of the first musicians to use the new F three-valved trumpet in public performance.
  - Rossini's mother dies, prompting his return home to Bologna.
  - The term "Gesamtkunstwerk" is first used in print, in an essay by Eusebius Trahndorff; it is later adopted by Richard Wagner.
  - Soprano Laure-Cinthie Montalant marries the tenor Vincent-Charles Damoreau.
  - The Zagreb Music Association is founded; one of its earliest members is Ivan Padovec.

== Popular music ==
- "I'd Be a Butterfly" w.m. Thomas Haynes Bayly

== Classical music ==
- Dionisio Aguado – 4 Rondos brillants, Op. 2
- Hector Berlioz – La mort d’Orphée (cantata)
- Frederic Chopin – Variations on "Là ci darem la mano" Op. 2
- Carl Czerny
  - 3 Sonatines faciles et brillantes, Op. 104
  - Piano Sonata Nos.6–9, Opp. 124, 143–145
  - Grande Serenade concertante, Op.126
  - 100 Progressive Studies, Op. 139
  - Concerto for Piano Four-Hands and Orchestra, Op. 153
- Mauro Giuliani – 6 Airs Irlandois nationales variées (for guitar), Op. 125
- Fanny Hensel – 6 Lieder, Op.9, Nos. 1, "Die Ersehnte" and 5 "Der Maiabend"
- Ferdinand Hiller
  - "Le sénateur" (dated June 22)
  - "Wandrers Nachtlied"
- Johann Wenzel Kalliwoda – Symphony No.1, Op. 7
- Friedrich Kuhlau
  - Flute Sonata, Op. 85
  - 4 Sonatinas, Op. 88
- Kaspar Kummer – Trio for Flute, Clarinet and Bassoon, Op. 32
- Franz Liszt – Scherzo in G minor, S.153
- Felix Mendelssohn
  - 7 Charakterstücke, Op.7
  - String Quartet No.2, Op.13
  - The Last Rose of Summer, Op.15
  - Piano Sonata No.3, Op.106 (dated May 31)
  - Tu es Petrus, Op.111
  - Christe, du Lamm Gottes, MWV 5
- Ferdinand Ries
  - Polonaise No.4, Op.140
  - 3 Flute Quartets, WoO 35, No. 2 in G major
- Pierre Rode – Violin Concerto No.11 in D major, Op. 23
- Franz Schubert
  - Winterreise (song cycle)
  - Piano Trio No. 1
  - Piano Trio No. 2
  - Im Abendrot, D.799
  - Impromptus, D.899 and D.935
  - 3 Gesänge, D.902
  - Zur guten Nacht, D.903
  - Alinde, D.904
  - An die Laute, D.905
  - Variations on a Theme from Herold's 'Marie', D. 908
  - Phantasie for violin and piano in C major, D.934
  - 12 Valses nobles, D. 969
- Ignaz Seyfried – Libera me Domine, continuation of Mozart's Requiem
- Louis Spohr
  - Violin Concerto No.11, Op. 70
  - Double String Quartet No.2, Op.77
- Christoph Ernst Friedrich Weyse – Et Eventyr i Rosenborg Have (Singspiel)

== Opera ==
- Vincenzo Bellini – Il Pirata
- Louise Bertin – Le loup-garou
- Michele Carafa – Les Deux Figaro
- Felix Mendelssohn – Die Hochzeit des Camacho, Op.10 (premiered April 29 in Berlin)
- Giovanni Pacini – Margherita regina d'Inghilterra
- Louis Spohr – Pietro von Abano, premiered Oct. 13 in Kassel.

== Births ==
- January 14 – Enderby Jackson, pioneer of the British brass band (d. 1903)
- January 16 (or 17) – Antonio Giuglini, operatic tenor (d. 1865)
- February 2 – Ludwig Eichrodt, lyricist (died 1892)
- February 9 – Auguste Dupont, composer (died 1890)
- February 12 – Alexander Wilhelm Gottschalg, composer (died 1908)
- February 14 – José Costa, composer (died 1881)
- February 18 – Marc Burty, music teacher and composer (died 1903)
- March 5
  - Hans Balatka, composer (d. 1899)
  - Emile Jonas, composer (died 1905)
- March 26 – Emanuel Kania, composer (died 1887)
- April 15 – Julius Tausch, composer (died 1895)
- April 25 – Jean Antoine Zinnen, composer (d. 1898)
- May 11 – Septimus Winner, composer (died 1902)
- August 20 (or 22) – Josef Strauss, waltz composer (d. 1870)
- August 22 – Edouard Silas, composer (died 1909)
- August 23 – Simon Waley, composer (died 1875)
- September 5 – Goffredo Mameli, lyricist of the Italian national anthem (d. 1849)
- September 13 – Catherine Winkworth, hymnist (died 1878)
- October 6 – Karl Riedel, conductor (died 1888)
- November 7 – Theodor Bernhard Sick, composer (died 1893)
- November 12 – Gustav Merkel, organist and composer (d. 1885)
- November 20 – Edmond Dédé, composer (died 1903)
- November 26 – Hugo Ulrich, composer, teacher and arranger (d. 1872)
- December 24 – Lisa Cristiani, cellist (died 1853)
- December 31 – Marie Caroline Miolan-Carvalho, French operatic soprano (d. 1895)
- date unknown
  - Martino Frontini, composer (d. 1909)
  - George Lichtenstein, Hungarian-born pianist and music teacher (d. 1893)

== Deaths ==
- January 18 – John Hoyland, organist and composer (b. 1783)
- January 30 – Johann Philipp Christian Schulz, composer (b. 1773)
- February 2 – Johann Nepomuk Kalcher, opera composer (b. 1764)
- February 11 – José Lidon, composer and musician (born 1748)
- February 26 – David Moritz Michael, composer (b. 1751)
- March 9 – Franz Xaver Gerl, operatic bass and composer (b. 1764)
- March 26 – Ludwig van Beethoven, composer (b. 1770)
- April 3 – Ernst Chladni, physicist and musician, "Father of acoustics" (b. 1756)
- May 9 – Friedrich Wilhelm Berner, composer (born 1780)
- June 4 – Stephan von Breuning, librettist (born 1774)
- July 17 – Charles Borremans, violinist and conductor (b. 1769)
- July 25 – Gottfried Christoph Härtel, music publisher (born 1763)
- August 2 – James Hewitt, composer, conductor and music publisher (b. 1770)
- August 3 – Lorenz Leopold Haschka, lyricist of the Austrian national anthem (b. 1749)
- August 9 – Marc-Antoine Madeleine Désaugiers, composer, dramatist and songwriter (b. 1772)
- August 28 – Adam Liszt, Hungarian musician, father of Franz Liszt (b. 1776)
- September 8 – Reginald Spofforth, composer (b. 1769)
- September 30 – Wilhelm Müller, lyricist (born 1794)
- November 6 – Bartolomeo Campagnoli, violinist (b. 1751)
- November 11 – Franz von Walsegg, count who commissioned Mozart's Requiem (b. 1763)
- November 20 – Alexey Nikolayevich Titov, violinist and composer (b. 1769)
- date unknown
  - James Hook, composer (b. 1746)
  - Syama Sastri, oldest of the Trinity of Carnatic music (b. 1762)
