= Chickering Hall =

Chickering Hall may refer to:

- Chickering Hall (Boston, 1883), a concert auditorium in Boston, Massachusetts
- Chickering Hall (Boston, 1901), an auditorium in Boston, Massachusetts
- Chickering Hall (New York City, 1875), a concert hall in New York City until the early 1900s
