= 1836 in music =

This article is about music-related events in 1836.

== Events ==
- June 7 – Huddersfield Choral Society formed in the north of England.
- July – Soprano Maria Malibran is seriously injured in a riding accident, but refuses to see a doctor; she dies later in the year at the age of 28.
- September 9 – Frédéric Chopin proposes marriage to Maria Wodzinski in Marienbad.
- November 24 – Richard Wagner marries Minna Planer.
- Saverio Mercadante is invited to Paris by Gioacchino Rossini.

== Classical music ==
- William Sterndale Bennett – Overture to The Naiads
- Henri Bertini – 2 Nocturnes, Op.102
- Ernesto Cavallini – 3 Duos for 2 Clarinets
- Gaetano Donizetti
  - String Quartet No.18, A 482
  - Viva il matrimonio (Se tu giri tutto il mondo)
- Louise Farrenc – Air russe varie, Op. 17
- Auguste Franchomme – Chant d’Adieux
- Franz Paul Lachner – Symphony No.5, Op.52
- Fanny Hensel – Frühzeitiger Frühling
- Felix Mendelssohn – St. Paul
- Robert Schumann – Fantasie in C
- Henri Vieuxtemps – Violin Concerto No. 2 in F♯ minor
- Issac Nathan – "Queen of Evening"

== Opera ==
- Adolphe Adam – Le Postillon de Longjumeau
- Louise Bertin – La Esmeralda (with libretto by Victor Hugo), premiered November 14 in Paris
- Gaetano Donizetti
  - L'assedio di Calais, premiered November 18 in Naples
  - Belisario
  - Il campanello, premiered June 1 in Naples
- Mikhail Glinka – A Life for the Tsar
- Saverio Mercadante – I Briganti, premiered March 22 in Paris
- Giacomo Meyerbeer – Les Huguenots
- Richard Wagner – Das Liebesverbot

== Popular music ==
- "Fair Harvard" (lyrics by Samuel Gilman)
- "Morning Star" (music by Francis F. Hagen)

== Publications ==
- John Addison – Singing Practically Treated in a Series of Instructions
- Dionisio Aguado – La Guitare, méthode simple
- Adolphe Miné – Méthode d'orgue

== Births ==
- February 16 – Benjamin Edward Woolf, violinist (died 1901)
- February 21 – Léo Delibes, composer (d. 1891)
- February 22 – Mitrofan Belyayev, music publisher (d. 1904)
- March 21 – Bertha Tammelin, Swedish musician, composer and singer (died 1915)
- March 24 – Eufrosyne Abrahamson, Swedish soprano (d. 1869)
- April 8 – Henry Brougham Farnie, librettist (died 1889)
- June 12 – Bernardine Hamaekers, Belgian opera singer (died 1912)
- June 29 – Thomas Philander Ryder, composer, organist, teacher, conductor, and organ builder (d. 1887)
- October 20 – Frederick Herbert Torrington, conductor, organist, and founder of the Toronto College of Music (d. 1917)
- October 27 – Luigi Hugues, geographer, flautist and composer (d. 1913)
- October 28 – Eliakum Zunser, Yiddish songwriter (d. 1925)
- November 18 – W. S. Gilbert, dramatist, poet and librettist (d. 1911)
- November 23 – Wilhelm Barge, flautist (died 1925)
- December 2 – Giuseppe Donati, inventor of the ocarina (d. 1925)
- date unknown
  - Tamburi Ali Efendi, Turkish tanbur virtuoso and composer (d. 1902)
  - Marie Proksch, pianist (died 1900)

== Deaths ==
- January 3 – Friedrich Witt, cellist and composer (b. 1770)
- February 8 – Franziska Stading, opera singer (b. 1763)
- February 22 – John Clarke Whitfield, organist and composer (b. 1770)
- May 7 – Norbert Burgmüller, composer (b. 1810) (drowned)
- May 28 – Anton Reicha, composer (b. 1770)
- June 9 – Supply Belcher, composer, singer, and compiler of tune books (b. 1751)
- June 26 – Claude Joseph Rouget de Lisle, composer of "La Marseillaise" (b. 1760)
- September 19 – Carl Friedrich Ebers, composer (born 1770)
- September 21 – John Stafford Smith, British composer, organist and musicologist (b. 1750)
- September 23
  - Maria Malibran, operatic soprano (b. 1808)
  - Andreas Razumovsky, patron of Ludwig van Beethoven (b. 1752)
- December 5 – Giuseppe Ciccimarra, operatic tenor (b. 1790)
- December 12 – Giuseppe Farinelli, composer (born 1769)
- December 26 – Hans Georg Nägeli, composer and music publisher (b. 1773)
- December 29 – Johann Baptist Schenk, Austrian composer and teacher (b. 1753)
