= 1832 in music =

This article is about music-related events in 1832.

== Events ==
- Spring – Elias Parish Alvars gives concerts in Constantinople before Sultan Mahmud II.
- February 26 – Chopin gives his debut Paris concert at the Salle Pleyel.
- April 20 – Franz Liszt attends a charity concert for the Parisian cholera epidemic given by Niccolò Paganini. He vows to become the 'Paganini of the Piano'.
- May 14 – Première of Felix Mendelssohn's overture The Hebrides is held in London.
- September – Paris's Opéra-Comique moves from Salle Ventadour to Salle de la Bourse.
- November 22 – Baritone Manuel García marries operatic soprano Cécile Eugénie Mayer.
- Changes to American Army regulations make bandsmen regular soldiers, required to serve in battle if needed, establishes a position for bandmasters, and limits the size of regimental bands.
- First Publication of "America (My Country, 'Tis of Thee)"

== Classical music ==
- Charles-Valentin Alkan – Concerti da Camera nos. 1 and 2, Op. 10
- William Sterndale Bennett – Piano Concerto No.1, Op.1
- Hector Berlioz – Lélio, Cantata, premiered December 9 in Paris
- Frederic Chopin
  - 5 Mazurkas Op. 7
  - Mazurka in B-flat major 'Wołowska', B.73
  - 3 Nocturnes Op. 9
- Johann Baptist Cramer – Piano Quintet No.3
- Adolf Friedrich Hesse – Fantasie für die Orgel zu 4 Händen, Op.35
- Friedrich Kuhlau
  - La clochette, Op. 121
  - Allegro pathetique for Piano 4-hands, Op. 123
  - Adagio and Rondo for Piano 4-Hands, Op. 124
- Albert Lortzing – Singspiel Szenen aus Mozarts Leben
- Felix Mendelssohn – Hebrides Overture
- Ignaz Moscheles
  - Piano Concerto No.5, Op.87
  - Grand septuor, Op.88
- Ivan Padovec – Variations, Op.4 (based on a Schubert waltz)
- Ferdinand Ries
  - Grande ouverture et marche triomphale, Op.172
  - Piano Concerto No.9, Op.177
- Clara Schumann – Caprices en forme de valses, Op. 2
- Robert Schumann - Toccata in C, Op. 7
- Bedřich Smetana – Galop (Kvapík) in D major, JB 2:1
- Johann Strauss, Sr.
  - Cotillons, Op. 50
  - Bajaderen-Walzer, Op. 53
  - Contratänze, Op. 54
  - Alexandra-Walzer, Op. 56
- Sigismond Thalberg – 6 Deutsche Lieder, Op. 8
- Richard Wagner
  - Polonaise in D major, WWV 23
  - 2 Entreactes tragiques, WWV 25
  - Concert Overture No.2 in C major, WWV 27 (dated March 3-17)
  - Symphony in C, WWV 29

== Opera ==
- Daniel François Esprit Auber – Le Serment, premiered October 1 in Paris
- Gaetano Donizetti
  - L'elisir d'amore, May 12, Teatro della Canobbiana, Milan.
  - Sancia di Castiglia (opera seria, first performed at the Teatro San Carlo in Naples, on November 4, 1832)
- Fromental Halévy – La tentation
- Albert Lortzing – Der Pole und sein Kind (premiered October 11 in Osnabrück

== Popular music ==
- "The Bloom is on the Rye (My Pretty Jane)" by Edward Fitzball & Henry Rowley Bishop

== Publications ==
- Ludwig van Beethoven – Published posthumously: Studien im Generalbass, Contrapunkt und in der Compositionslehre
- Joseph Funk – A Compilation of Genuine Church Music
- Nicola Vaccai – Metodo pratico de canto

== Births ==
- January 1 – Aloys Kunc, pedagogue and composer (died 1895)
- January 17 – Marie Wieck, pianist, singer, piano teacher, and composer (died 1916)
- January 27 – Lewis Carroll, lyricist (died 1898)
- January 28 – Franz Wüllner, conductor and composer (died 1902)
- February 12 – Gustave Satter, pianist and composer (died 1879)
- February 15 – Nicolás Ruiz Espadero, pianist, composer, piano teacher and editor of the works of Louis Moreau Gottschalk (died 1890)
- March 1 – Friedrich Grützmacher, cellist (died 1903)
- March 4 – Ivan Melnikov, operatic baritone (died 1906)
- March 7 – William Busnach, librettist (died 1907)
- April 14 – Wilhelm Busch, lyricist (died 1908)
- April 15 – Gabriel Baille, composer (died 1909)
- June 3 – Charles Lecocq, composer (died 1918)
- July 2 – Félix Henri Duquesnel, lyricist (died 1915)
- June 15 – Sigmund Schlesinger, composer (died 1918)
- July 17 – August Söderman, composer (died 1876)
- July 24 – Johann Lauterbach, composer (died
- August 3
  - Étienne Rey, composer (died 1923)
  - Ivan Zajc, composer, conductor, director and teacher (died 1914)
- August 7 – Julius Epstein, pianist (died 1926)
- August 15 – Ernst Naumann, organist and composer (died 1910)
- September 9 – Petro Nishchynsky, composer (died 1896)
- September 14 – Giuseppe Capponi, operatic tenor (died 1889)
- September 20 – Johann Joseph Abert, composer (died 1915)
- October 1 – Henry Clay Work, US composer (died 1884)
- October 7 – Charles Crozat Converse, composer (died 1918)
- October 14 – Heinrich Armin Rattermann, lyricist and translator (died 1923)
- October 22
  - Leopold Damrosch, conductor (died 1885)
  - Robert Eitner, musicologist (died 1905)
  - August Labitzky, composer and kapellmeister (died 1903)
- October 25 – Julián Arcas, composer (died 1882)
- October 29 – Anders Heyerdahl, violinist and composer (died 1918)
- November 1 – Eleanora Ehrenbergů, operatic soprano (died 1912)
- November 3 – Henry Behning, Sr., piano maker (died 1905)
- November 11 – Paolo Giorza, composer (died 1914)
- November 12 – John Troutbeck, musicologist (died 1899)
- December 24 – Manuel Del Palacio, lyricist (died 1906)
- date unknown – Julián Arcas, composer for guitar (died 1882)

== Deaths ==
- February 15 – Hartenack Otto Conrad Zinck, composer (born 1746)
- March 10 – Muzio Clementi, composer and pianist, 80
- March 12 – Friedrich Kuhlau, composer, 45 (born 1786)
- March 22 – Johann Wolfgang von Goethe, lyricist and librettist (born 1749)
- March 23 – Wilhelm Würfel, pianist, conductor and composer, 41
- May 15 – Carl Friedrich Zelter, conductor, composer and music teacher, 73
- May 26 – François-Louis Perne, composer and musicologist, 59
- June 10 – Manuel García, opera singer, 57
- July 25 – Sébastien Demar, composer (born 1763)
- July 28 – Joseph Schreyvogel, music publisher (born 1768)
- August 19 – George Aspull, pianist, singer and composer, 19
- August 31 – Auguste Kreutzer, composer (born 1778)
- September 9 – Bernhard Klein, composer, 39
- September 21 – Sir Walter Scott, lyricist (born 1771)
- November 3 – Pietro Generali, composer, 59
- November 15 – Konrad von Schmidt-Phiseldeck, lyricist (born 1770)
- December 12 – Andrea Nozzari, operatic tenor, 57
- December 22 – Ishmail Spicer, composer, 72
- December 31 – Adelaide Malanotte, operatic contralto, 47
- date unknown
  - Philip Antony Corri, composer (b. 1784)
  - Isabelle de Montolieu, lyricist and translator (born 1751)
