= Chickering Hall (New York City, 1875) =

Former concert hall in New York City (1875-1893)

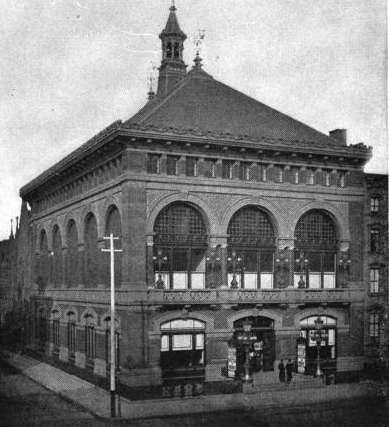
- Interactive map of Chickering Hall
- Address: 130 Fifth Avenue at 18th Street; New York City; United States
- Location: Manhattan
- Coordinates: 40°44′20″N 73°59′31″W
- Owner: Chickering & Sons
- Capacity: 1,450

Construction
- Built: 1870s
- Opened: 15 September 1875
- Closed: 1893
- Demolished: 1901
- Cost: $175,000 (Inflation: 4855455)
- Architect: George B. Post

Chickering Hall (1875 - 1893) was a concert and music hall in Manhattan, New York City, New York, located on Fifth Avenue.

== History ==
Chickering Hall, commissioned by Chickering & Sons, was situated at the northwest corner of Fifth Avenue and 18th Street in the New York City borough of Manhattan. It was designed by the American architect George B. Post and F.C. Murray. The building housed a music store, piano warehouse, and concert hall. Above the ground-level salesroom, its 1,450-seat auditorium, located on the second and third floors, hosted concerts, lectures, and conferences.

At the inauguration of the new music hall on November 15, 1875, German pianist Hans von Bülow gave his first New York City performance.

The concert hall was managed by Edward H. Colell in 1891 and was still under the ownership of Chickering and Sons. In 1893, the building was entirely repurposed into a retail space for John Wanamaker's department store, taking over city piano sales.

The original Chickering Hall building in New York City was sold and demolished in the early 1900s. Chickering & Sons merged with the American Piano Company who later established a new building in the borough of Manhattan on 57th Street under the same name in 1924.

== Events & Performances ==
- Hans von Bülow piano concert, November 15-24, 1875
- 5th International Congress of Ophthalmology, September 12-14, 1876
- Robert G. Ingersoll lecture, February 3, 1878
- Chamber music of New York Philharmonic with Ema Pukšec, Sebastian Bach Mills, Ferdinand Quentin Dulcken, and more, April 1, 1879
- 15th Annual Commencement of the New York College of Dentistry, February 23, 1881
- Oscar Wilde, English Renaissance lecture, January 9, 1882
- Kneisel Quartet, Pol Plançon, Antoinette Szumowska, and more, February 8, 1898
- Frederic Farrar lecture, October 29, 1885

== Gallery ==
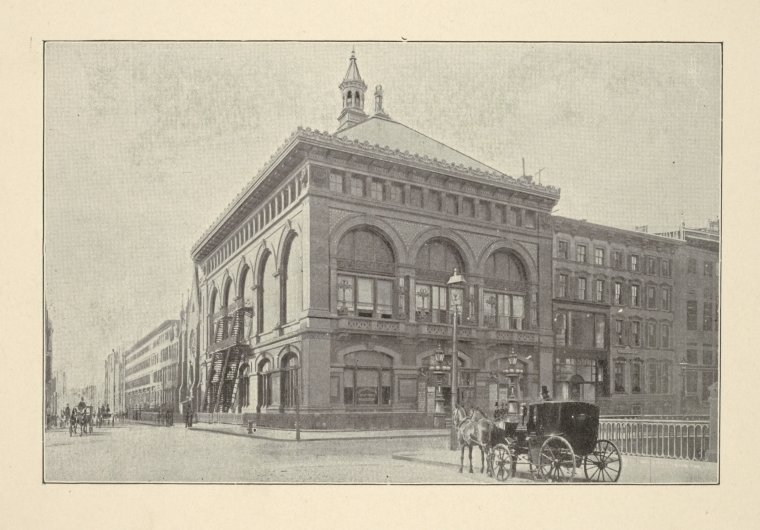
Chickering Hall, northwest corner of Fifth Avenue and 18th Street, New York City

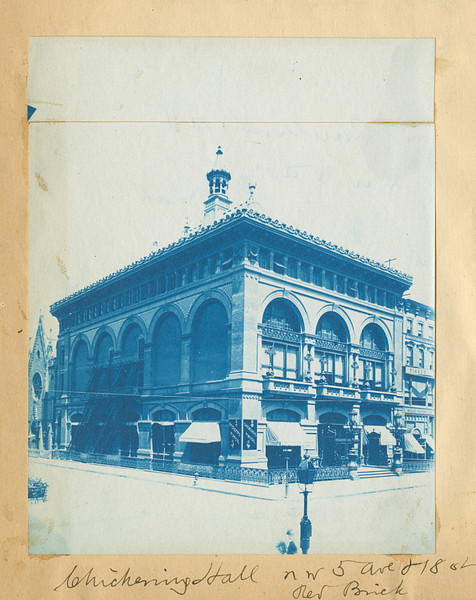
Exterior view of Chickering Hall, 1892

== See also ==
- Chickering Hall (Boston, 1883)
- Chickering Hall (Boston, 1901)
- Chickering and Sons
