= Ellis Silas =

British artist

- Born: 13 July 1885; London, England
- Died: 2 May 1972 (aged 86); London, England
- Known for: Painting
- Spouse: Ethel Florence Detheridge

Ellis Luciano Silas (13 July 1885 - 2 May 1972) was a British artist and draughtsman who served as an ANZAC during the First World War.

== Early life ==
Born in London, Silas' grandfather was the Anglo-Dutch composer Edouard Silas and his father, Louis Silas was an artist. Silas studied art from his father and was also a student of the artist Walter Sickert. In 1907, aged 23, Silas moved to Australia where he continued to develop as a painter.

== First World War ==
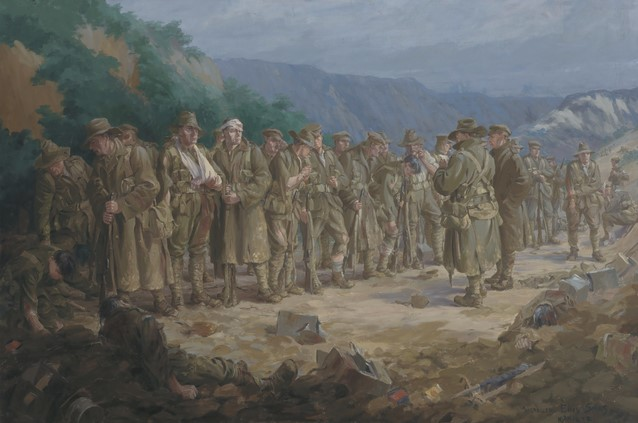
Roll Call, Ellis Silas (1920)

In October 1914, Silas enlisted as a private in the 16th Battalion of the Australian Imperial Force. Silas' battalion trained in Egypt and then landed at Gallipoli in April 1915. Silas served as a signaller at Pope's Hill, Quinn's Post and Bloody Angle and kept a diary and sketchbook but six weeks at the front left him suffering from neurasthenia and enteric fever and he was evacuated from Turkey back to Egypt, before being discharged as medically unfit in London in August 1916.

His sketches from the front were viewed by King George and Queen Mary in May 1916. His book Crusading at Anzac was published in 1916 with forewords by Sir Ian Hamilton and William Birdwood.

Before returning to Australia in 1921, Silas executed a series of paintings depicting his wartime experiences. The Australian War Memorial holds over 60 sketches, drawings and watercolours by Silas, including large scale paintings such as The Roll Call. A second version of The Roll Call is in the collection of the UK's Imperial War Museum.

== Trobriand Islands and subsequent career ==
In 1922, Silas sailed for the Trobriand Islands in Papua New Guinea as artist for a three-year expedition. Many of the resulting sketches and artifacts Silas collected are now held in the British Museum.

On his return Silas published A Primitive Arcadia, a book of his impressions of the islands and many works he produced during his stay were published in the Illustrated London News, The Sketch and The Graphic.

Returning to England in 1925, Silas became known as a marine artist, with works such as HMS Wave Ashore at St Ives (1952), painted from life and The Price of Glory (1934), a version of which is in the collection of the National Maritime Museum.

He also produced a series of posters for British Railways including depictions of Ayr, Redcar and Filey.
