= Georg Schmitt =

German-French organist and composer (1821–1900)

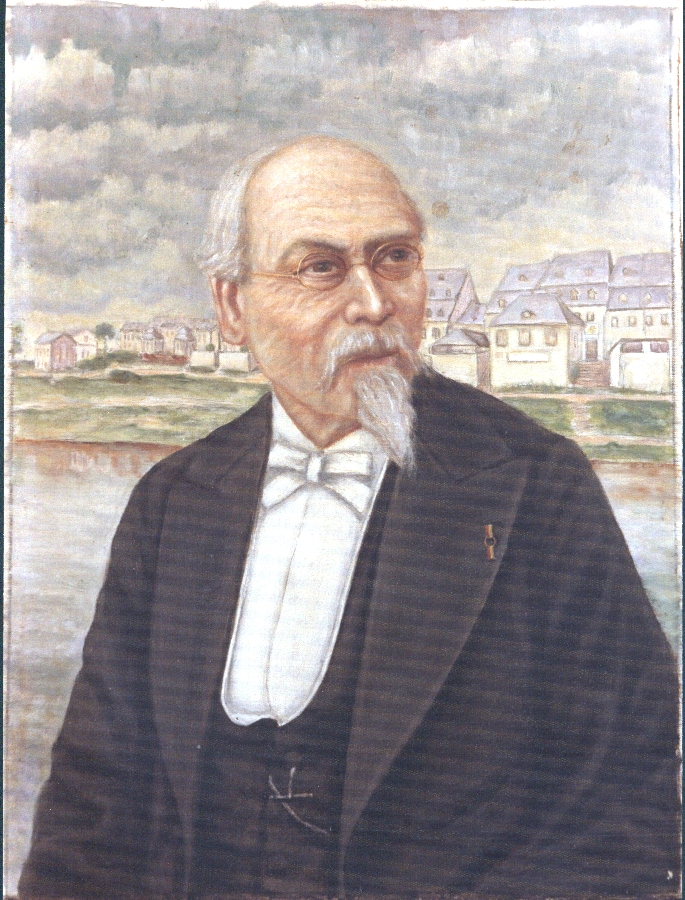
- Born: 11 March 1821; Zurlaubener Ufer (Trier), Germany
- Died: 7 December 1900 (aged 79); Paris, France
- Burial place: Père Lachaise Cemetery
- Occupations: Organist; Pianist; Composer; Music teacher
- Spouse: Leontine Aline Peau (1822–1905)
- Children: 1. Marie Schmitt/Duclos (1848–1907) author, using the pseudonym "Paul George"; 2. Caroline Schmitt (1850–1913); 3. Georges Arthur Emmanuel Schmitt (1852–1921) chief accountant with a sugar factory 4. Paul Léon Felix Schmitt (1855–1903) architect 5. Noëmi Schmitt (1859–1916) miniaturist
- Parent(s): Johann Georg Schmitt (1787–1832); Catharina Marx (1809–1868)

Johann Georg Gerhard Schmitt (11 March 1821 – 7 December 1900), in French Jean-Georges Gérard Schmitt, was a Paris-based composer and organist, originally from the Prussian Lower Rhine province. He was only 14 when he took over as organist at Trier Cathedral: the position had fallen vacant three years earlier through the early death of the previous incumbent, his father.

== Life ==
Johann Georg Gerhard Schmitt was born at Zurlaubener Ufer, a riverside fishing hamlet on the northern edge of Trier (into which it has subsequently been subsumed). His birth took place in the little hotel run by his parents, Johann Georg Schmitt (1787–1832) and his wife, born Catharina Marx (1809–1868). Two hundred years later, there is still a hotel on the site: it is now named "Gasthaus Mosellied", after a song which during the nineteenth century became one of Schmitt's more widely appreciated compositions. The elder Johann Georg Schmitt combined his business as an hotelier with the post of Trier Cathedral organist between 1810 and his death in 1832. During his final illness his son frequently deputised for him, despite being aged only 11 at the time of the father's death. Over the next two years the boy, whose early music lessons had been provided by his father, was sent to Münster in order to master the craft of a cathedral organist, studying with the Münster organist and choirmaster, Franz Joseph Antony (1790–1837). His study was funded by the Trier cathedral chapter.

On 1 March 1835, still not quite fifteen years old, Georg Schmitt was officially appointed to his father's old job of Trier Cathedral organist. In 1836 he accepted a teaching appointment at the adjacent cathedral music school. It was a most promising start. However, difficulties soon emerged in terms of his relationship with the cathedral chapter. The young man was unreliable: he arrived late for services, or failed to turn up at all. Worse still, he took to incorporating folksy and frivolous elements in the improvised organ passages played before and after services or while the priests celebrated and administered the Eucharist. The cathedral administrators reacted by forfeiting amounts from his salary. He even found himself threatened with the sanction of a Drillarrest [penal arrest]. Matters took a turn for the worse in 1838 when the cathedral chapter appointed a Director of Cathedral Music. It seems to have been a newly created position. Johann Baptist Schneider (1801–1864) arrived with his own ideas on church music. Inspired by Cecilian Movement which were by now spreading north across Germany, he almost immediately, in 1839, arranged for the cathedral to incorporate orchestral music in worship. He promoted the incorporation of sixteenth century masses and motets by Palestrina and Lassus as well as contemporary works by Mendelssohn. Schmitt was involved in exploiting and reworking much of the old music, and quickly became a prolific adaptor of existing works. The period was important for his development as a composer, but there was much scope for differences of approach, interpretation and opinion. When Schneider reacted to these "artistic differences" by complaining to the cathedral authorities he generally found them supportive, and in 1842 Schmitt was summarily dismissed.

In 1844 Schmitt moved to Paris. It is far from clear whether, at this stage, he intended for this to be the start of a permanent emigration. He took charge of the music at a succession of churches including, eventually, Saint-Joseph-des-Allemands, known at that time as the church of the city's growing German expatriate community. There are indications that alongside his skills as an organist, Schmitt was an outstanding pianist. During his early years in Paris he supported himself by giving piano lessons. According to one source he was also taking lessons himself, during this period, from the Paris-based composers Fromental Halévy and Louis Niedermeyer. He and they were in any events part of a network in Paris of music professionals whose family origins went back to German-speaking central Europe.

It was not till 1846 that, after two years away, Schmitt undertook his first visit back to Trier. He was still enjoying his break in the Mosel region when he composed his "Mosellied" ("Mosel Song"). The song is a setting of "Im weiten deutschen Lande" (loosely, "In the wide German lands"), a poem by Theodor Reck (1815–1873), which amounts to a hymn celebrating the beauty of the Mosel valley and the people living there. It was written in response to a competition organised by the casino at the health resort of Traben-Trarbach which attracted 171 entries. Schmitt's submission only came second in the competition, and the prize of 1350 bottles of local wine was accordingly shipped to Dresden, home of Julius Otto, the composer of the winning melody (which according to one possibly scurrilous suggestion he had "borrowed" from his father). In Trier and the surrounding countryside the "Mosellied" established Schmitt as a composer of note, the composer's reputation being no doubt enhanced by the song's inclusion in the school song book used in the region. The song has also served to ensure that the composer continues to enjoy a significant posthumous reputation with Schlager fans in Germany. It seems not to have resonated in the composer's adopted home city of Paris, however.

Back in Paris, in 1847 Schmitt married the pianist Léontine Aline Pau who came from a family of painters. She, like him, was also a piano teacher. Three of the couple's five children would become painters-artists.

Revolution returned to the streets of Paris early in 1848: in August 1848 Schmitt, whose studying and teaching work had been disrupted by the political developments of the time, set off for the America. He would be away from Paris for more than a year. He settled, briefly, in Louisiana and was employed for a time as the organist or the assistant organist (sources differ) at the St. Louis Cathedral in New Orleans. He remained at the cathedral for long enough to supervise the installation of a new three manual organ at the cathedral, build and installed by Matthias Schwab (1808–1862) (Note: Matthias Schwab had immigrated to Ohio in 1831, having been born either in "Germany" or else in Bern, Switzerland, so had presumably, like Schmitt, grown up with a dialect of German as his original "mother tongue".) of Cincinnati.

Towards the end of 1849 Schmitt returned to Paris, "lured", according to one source, by the offer of the organist's post at Saint-Sulpice, filling the position vacated through the death earlier that year of Louis-Nicolas Séjan. Schmitt's incumbency commenced, formally, on 1 January 1850 and lasted slightly more than 13 years. It was at Schmitt's instigation that between 1857 and 1862 the organ was greatly enlarged by Aristide Cavaillé-Coll, a celebrity among nineteenth century organ builders among. The resulting 100 register instrument was sufficiently impressive to persuade one of Schmitt's most illustrious successors at Saint-Sulpice, Charles-Marie Widor, to remain in post for more than 60 years, and can still be enjoyed today (2021): it has "never been electrified", though necessary maintenance has been undertaken during the intervening century and a half: most notably a meticulous and "respectful" dusting exercise was performed between 1988 and 1991.

When Schmitt left his job at Saint-Sulpice at the end of April 1863, the move was made at the instigation of Aristide Cavaillé-Coll, who indicate that he would prefer that his "masterwork of an instrument" should be entrusted to the hands (and feet) of his friend Alfred Lefébure-Wély. There were suggestions that Schmitt's style was considered too classical-contrapuntal (so "too German"?) for the "operatic" style that had by this time become fashionable in post-revolutionary Paris in the Second French Empire. Schmitt seems to have had no difficulty in finding alternative work as choirmaster and organist at other Paris churches. He was also employed for a number of years at the prestigious École Niedermeyer de Paris. A number of Schmitt's pupils from that time went on to occupy important organist posts across France.

Schmitt was particularly influential in terms of his own influence in support of the church music reform movement. He rejected the use in churches of what he regarded as "secular" music, and backed a return to the old "real" church music repertoire. He was able to pursue these objectives in "Musée de musique religieuse", a religious music compilation containing 48 organ pieces which he published. A number of friends and colleagues among the leading Paris church organists of the time contributed, including César Franck, Alexis Chauvet, Charles Colin and Camille Saint-Saëns. Schmitt was also one of the organisers of the "Congress of the restoration of plain-chant and church music" held in November/December 1860, thereby increasing the level of his own networking and that of colleagues among church musicians in the city. He also contributed numerous articles to "Revue de musique sacrée religieuse", a specialist periodical publication on sacred and religious music, in which he expounded on his vision of the "Cäcilianism" movement which, throughout the nineteenth century, was becoming more influential in respect of church music selection and performance. He thereby became a mediator between the differing music cultures on each side of the Rhine.

As a leading Paris church organist and as an effective proponent of the Cecilian reforms, Schmitt enjoyed a successful career. A side of his musical personality that failed to resonate on the same scale involved his determination to master the light-opera genre. He was persistent. And he did succeed in having his four act comic opera "La belle Madeleine" produced at the (private) "Théâtre Déjazet". There were also small-scale productions of some of his other operettas, in several cases with the active support of his compatriot Jacques Offenbach. But a breakthrough into the world of the French musical stage nevertheless eluded him, while the continuing success in western Germany of the "Mosellied" always remained something of a "one-off". Commercial success for a man whose name and demeanour marked him out as a "German" composer became harder after the humiliation of military defeat at Sedan and the ensuing four month Siege of Paris. Schmitt himself had managed, with his family, to escape the brief but brutal civil war that erupted in Paris during 1870/71 by fleeing to Brittany. With a French-born wife and five French born children in the process of transferring to adulthood, Schmitt formally – and perhaps belatedly – took French citizenship only in 1872, but audiences for his operettas for the most part nevertheless stayed away. He submitted, in the end, three great choral symphonies (all evoking the great choral-orchestral traditions associated with Berlioz) for Paris composition contests, as well as several cantatas, but – possibly unfairly – he failed to win prizes with them. There was, perhaps, consolation to be had for the composer in him from the fact that during his lifetime a number of his piano pieces and songs for piano accompaniment found publishers and were sold commercially.

"Le Sinai", a "dramatic symphony" composed by Schmitt in 1879, was re-discovered performed at Trier in 2014 as part of the Mosel Music Festival.

== Death and celebration ==
Schmitt died in Paris on 7 December 1900. His body was buried in what would become a family grave in the city's Père Lachaise Cemetery. (Note: Cimetière du Père-Lachaise Division 91: Sépulture de Georges Schmitt * Georges Schmitt (1821–1900), compositeur, organiste de la cathédrale de Trèves, et organiste de Saint-Sulpice et Saint-Germain-des-Prés * Paul Georges Schmitt (1848–1907), philosophe, poète et littérateur * Noémie Schmitt (1859–1916), artiste-peintre)

An organ recital was given at Saint-Sulpice in October 2000 by Josef Still, the organist from the Trier Cathedral in order to celebrate the (then imminent) centenary of Schmitt's death. The programme included three pieces by Schmitt and two more by Eugène Gigout and Théodore Dubois, two of Schmitt's pupils. For most purposes, however, Georges Schmitt is little remembered in France.

His name resonates more powerfully in Germany, and especially in and around Trier, where his "Mosellied" ("Mosel Song") continues to feature in Schlager performances. The renaming of his parents' hotel, in which Schmitt was born, as the "Gasthaus Mosellied" ("Mosel Song Hotel") encourages recognition of the ballad. Close to the hotel is the Georg Schmitt Square, a piece of open ground by Trier's Emperor Wilhelm Bridge across the Moselle.
