= Boléro de concert =

- Organ music by Alfred Lefébure-Wély
- Lefébure-Wély, 1860
- English: Concert Bolero
- Key: G minor
- Opus: 166
- Dedication: "À son élève Madame la Comtesse Bois de Mouzilly"

The Boléro de concert (French: Concert Bolero), Op. 166, is a composition for harmonium or organ without pedal by Alfred Lefébure-Wély. It was first published in 1865. The composition was adapted for wind instruments.

== History ==
Lefébure-Wély was a gifted pianist and organist who studied at the Paris Conservatoire from age 14, including composition with Fromental Halévy who was known for his operas. Lefébure-Wély held organist positions at several major churches in Paris, including the La Madeleine and Saint-Sulpice, Paris. He composed the Boléro de concert for a student, Comtesse Bois de Mouzilly who played the harmonium. It is suitable as a postlude (sortie) in church services. The composition was first published in 1865.

== Recordings ==
In 1988, organist David Britton played Boléro de concert as part of an organ recital recording, with music by mostly French composers. It appears on a 2006 recording of music by Lefébure-Wély played and arranged by organist Joachim Enders and trumpeter Manfred Bockschweiger at the Klais organ in St. Wolfgang near Dieburg. Martin Setchell included the piece in a recording of French organ music, volume VII of the series Great Australasian Organs, played at the Rieger organ of Christchurch Town Hall, which was silenced by the 2011 Christchurch earthquake. Boléro de concert was selected for the presentation of the new Rieger organ of the Vienna Cathedral in a recording with organist Konstantin Reymaier.
