= St. James Theatre (Boston) =

Coordinates: 42°20′37.27″N 71°5′4.37″W

The St. James Theatre (1912–1929) of Boston, Massachusetts, was a playhouse and cinema in the Back Bay in the 1910s and 1920s. It occupied the former Chickering Hall on Huntington Avenue near Massachusetts Avenue, adjacent to Horticultural Hall. For some years Loew's theatre chain oversaw the St. James. In 1929 the theatre "became part of the Publix (Paramount) chain, and was renamed the Uptown."

== Images ==
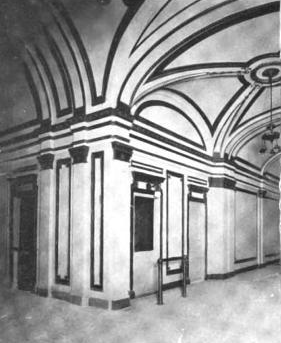
Interior, 1912

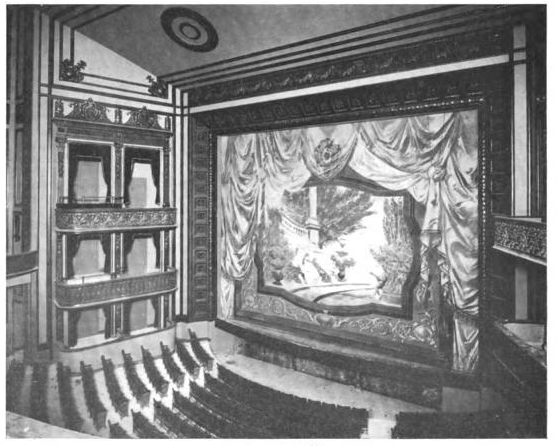
Interior, 1912

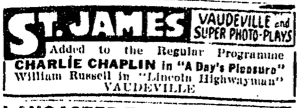
Advertisement for "vaudeville and super photo-plays," 1920, including Charlie Chaplin's A Day's Pleasure

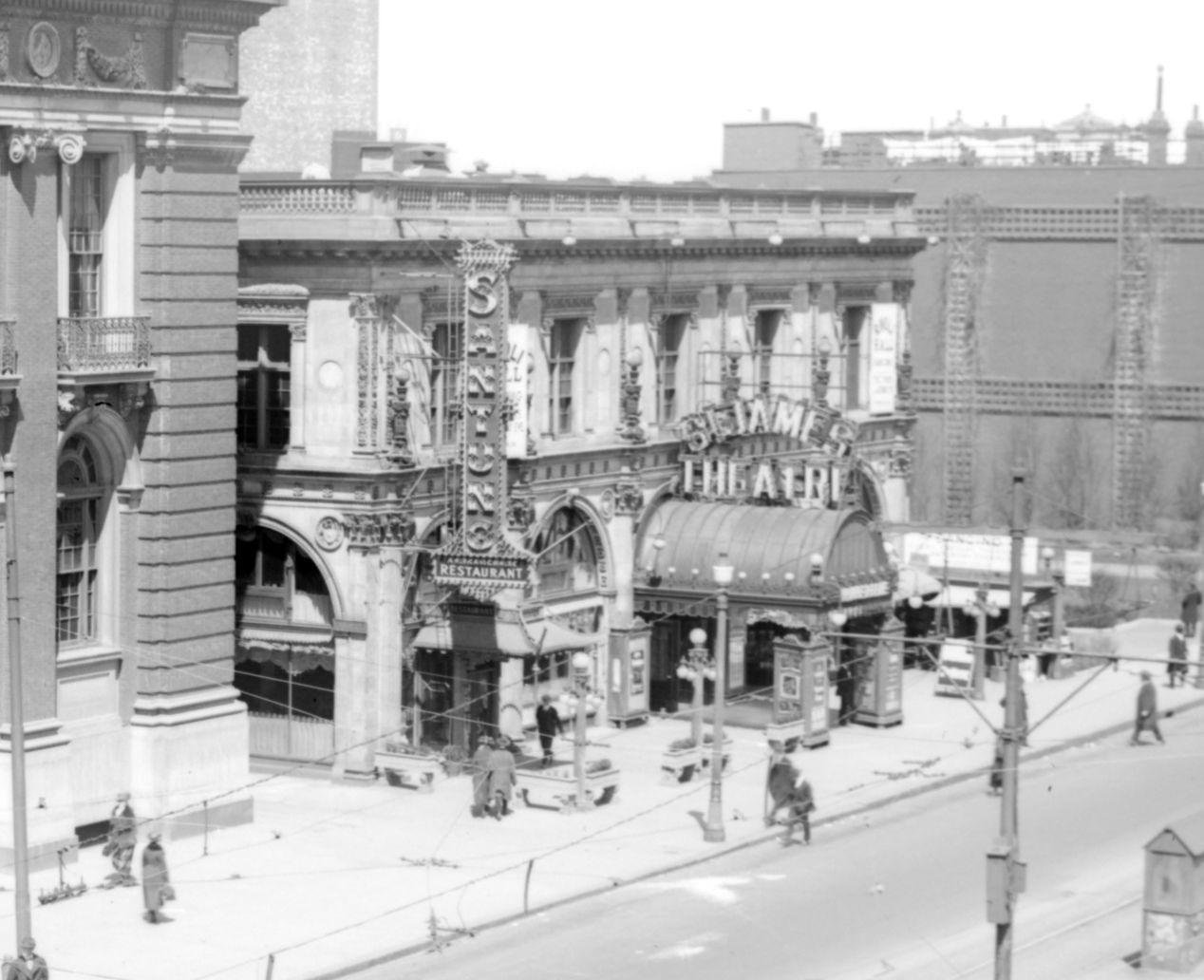
St. James Theatre (center), next to Horticultural Hall (at left), 1920

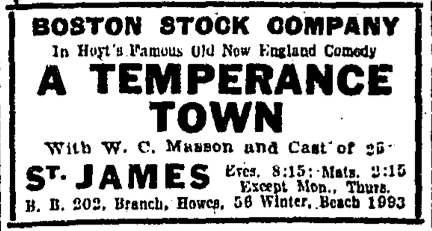
Advertisement for Boston Stock Company production of Charles H. Hoyt's A Temperance Town, 1922
