= Anton Herzog =

Teacher, organist, composer, choir director (1771–1850)

Anton Herzog was a school teacher in Wiener Neustadt and noted for his account of the commissioning of the Requiem from Wolfgang Amadeus Mozart by Count Franz von Walsegg. The document was censored in Vienna in February 1839; the back of the booklet was marked "Not allowed Imperial and Royal Office Censor. Vienna, 8 Feb. 1839. Freyberger mpria." An edited version finally appeared in a Vienna newspaper in 1925.

Herzog is also noted for his historical accounts of the Walsegg family. This included his works on the death of Walsegg's wife in February 1791. This incident is said to have caused the controversy about Mozart's Requiem after the count allegedly commissioned Mozart to compose a requiem to commemorate the anniversary of her death.

== Requiem controversy ==
Herzog offered a first-person account recognized as crucial in the preservation of the history of Mozart's Requiem. He stated that he had personal involvement with Walsegg, including two performances of the work, which the count directed in December 1793 and February 1794. In the Herzog Report, he claimed that the requiem existed in the form of a quintet, although this was - at the time of his writing - already lost. After its edited versions were published by newspapers in Vienna in the early 1920s, it was again published in 1964 when the document was discovered by Otto Erich Deutsch in the archives of Wiener Neustadt.

Herzog made two important claims. First, he said that he was present when the transcript was made of the original score and, second, that he possessed the original score of the Requiem. His account also included information from people associated with or who had knowledge of the composition of Requiem such as Abbe Maximilian Stadler. When he attempted to publish the history of the events leading to the composition of the piece 47 years earlier, he was a school teacher at Wiener Neustadt, a city halfway between Stuppach and Vienna.

Some scholars, however, note that there are parts in Herzog's account that are ambiguous and incorrect. For instance, there was Herzog's claim that the Requiem's manuscript used by the publisher Breitkopf & Hartel for its printed publication of the material contained a different Agnus Dei from the version owned by Walsegg. This was a factual error, which Herzog tried to address by stating that Walsegg was Mozart's student.
