= Charles-Alexandre Fessy =

French musician (1804–1856)

Charles-Alexandre (Alexandre-Charles) Fessy (October 18, 1804 – November 30, 1856) was a French organist and composer. He entered the Paris Conservatory in 1813 studying harmony and piano. He later joined the organ class of Benoist and won first prize in organ in 1826. He was organist of the small organ in l'Assomption before becoming the first organist of la Madeleine in 1846. The following year he exchanged position with Lefébure-Wély the organist of Saint-Roch. Fessy stayed at Saint-Roch until his death in 1856. Apart from being an organist he also served as the conductor of the 5th Legion of the National Guard in Paris.

== Works ==
- Pièces pour orgue (Éditions Musicales Chanvrelin 1995)

Offertoire
Choeur de Clairon
Grand Choeur
Les Jeux de Fonds
Fugue
Boléro

== Scores ==
- Free scores by Charles-Alexandre Fessy at the International Music Score Library Project (IMSLP)

== For listening ==
- Aare-Paul Lattik plays Boléro on YouTube at the Rieger-Kloss organ in St-Nicolas church, Tallinn, Estonia.
