= Thomas Philander Ryder =

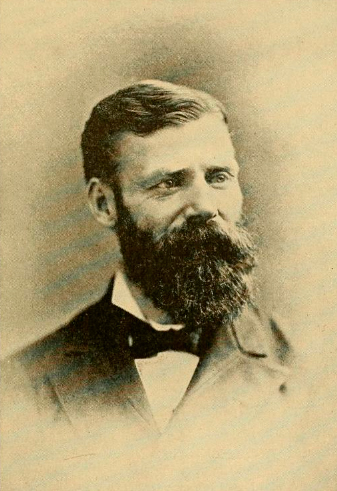

Thomas Philander Ryder Jr. (June 29, 1836 – December 2, 1887) was an American composer, organist, teacher, conductor, and organ builder.

Ryder was born in Cohasset, Massachusetts. His father, Thomas Philander Ryder, was a Harvard graduate and a teacher and administrator at Boston Latin School. His younger brother George Ryder was a Boston-area organ builder and an early mentor to Ernest Skinner. He often went by the name Philando Ryder.

He studied with Gustav Satter before taking a post as a church organist in Hyannis. From 1879 he served at the Tremont Temple in Boston. He also served as choirmaster and teacher, and compiled anthologies of sacred and secular partsongs. He was also popular as a composer of hymns and parlor pieces for piano. He died in Somerville, Massachusetts.
