= Alfred Lefébure-Wély =

French organist and composer

Lefébure-Wély, 1860

Louis-James Alfred Lefébure-Wély (13 November 1817 – 31 December 1869) was a French organist and composer. He played a major role in the development of the French symphonic organ style and was closely associated with the organ builder Aristide Cavaillé-Coll, inaugurating many new Cavaillé-Coll organs.

== Biography ==
Lefébure-Wély was born in Paris, son of an organist. He studied with his father, Isaac-François-Antoine Lefebvre (1756–1831), who had changed his name to Antoine Lefébure-Wely after being appointed organist of the church of Saint-Roch in the 1st arrondissement. In the manuscript of an unpublished Mass by his father is a note:

This Mass was played on Easter Tuesday 1826 by my little boy Alfrede, age eight years and four months, on the organ of Saint-Roch to the satisfaction of everyone present. He retained throughout the Mass an extraordinary presence that surprised the people who were near him at the organ.

Within two years of that occasion, Antoine Lefébure-Wely suffered a stroke, paralysing his left side. For the next five years, his son deputised for him. When Alfred was fourteen Antoine died, and the son succeeded the father as official organist of Saint-Roch. While holding the post he entered the Paris Conservatoire in 1832, studying with François Benoist. In 1835 he won first prize for organ. Following that, he studied composition with Henri-Montan Berton and Fromental Halévy. In 1838 he began a long association with the organ-builder Aristide Cavaillé-Coll, performing to a huge audience on Cavaillé-Coll's new instrument at Notre-Dame-de-Lorette. A reviewer in La France musicale praised Lefébure-Wely's technical skill, but advised him to play music of a more serious style than he had developed. Lefébure-Wely, however, continued to perform music of a popular operatic type. When a new Cavaillé-Coll organ was installed at Saint-Roch in 1842, Lefébure-Wely incurred critical disapproval for playing a fantasia on themes from Meyerbeer's popular opera Robert le diable.

He is an author of a manual for harmonium playing technique. He introduced the harmonium to Marc Burty.

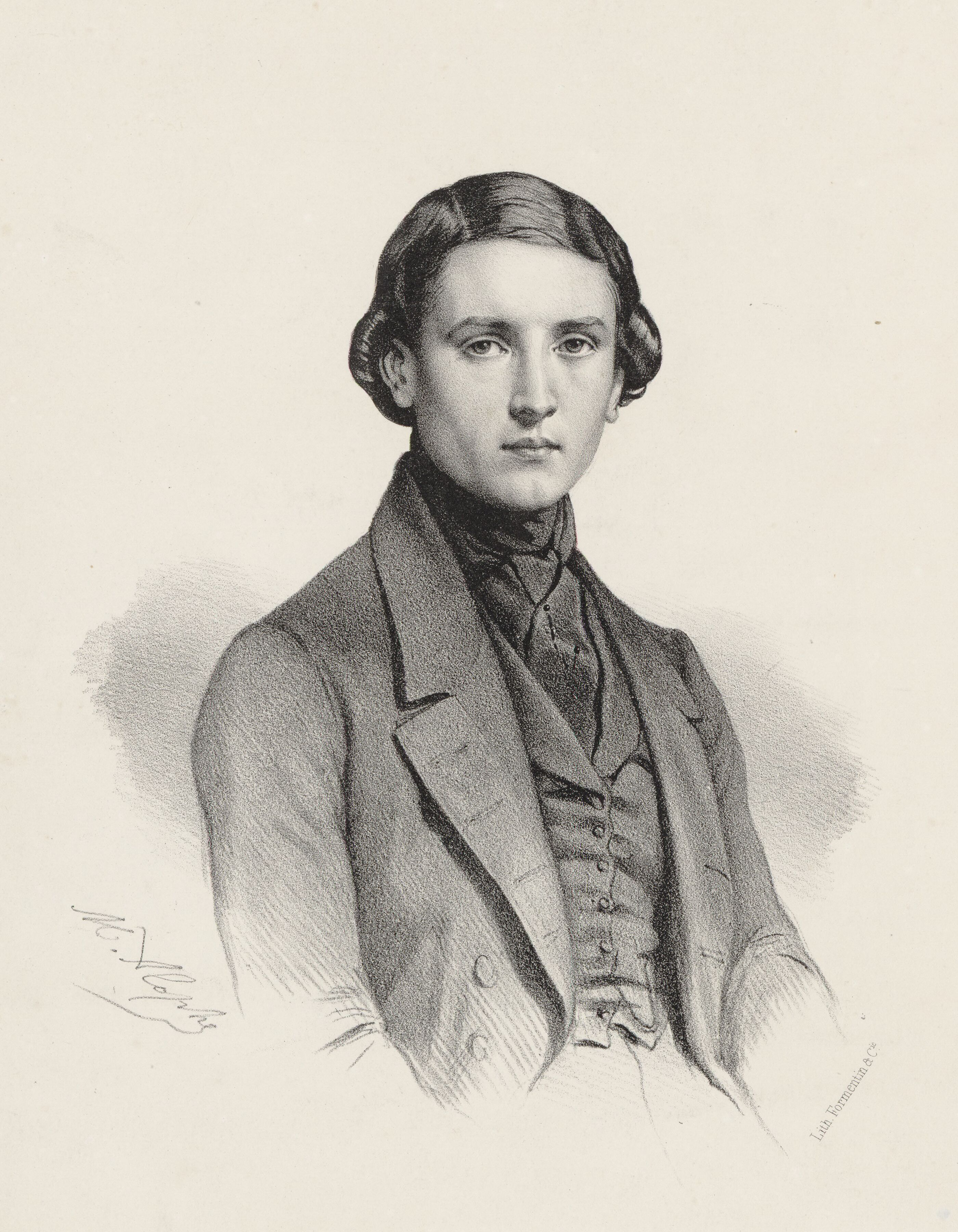
Lefébure-Wely in 1840

Lefébure-Wely was a "protégé of the aristocracy, he frequented the bourgeois salons where he often performed with his wife, a singer … and his two daughters who were pianists. He was the incarnation of the organ of the Second Empire."In 1847 Lefébure-Wely moved to the Église de la Madeleine, exchanging posts with the previous organist, Charles-Alexandre Fessy. In 1849 he was in charge of the music for the funeral of Frédéric Chopin, for which he transcribed some of Chopin's piano works for the organ, attracting critical praise.

Lefébure-Wely was awarded the Légion d'honneur in 1850. Adolphe Adam commented that "Lefébure-Wely is the most skilful artist I know"; Camille Saint-Saëns, Lefébure-Wely's successor at the Madeleine, observed, "Lefébure-Wely was a wonderful improviser … but he left only a few unimportant compositions for the organ." He was the dedicatee of "12 études pour les pieds seulement" by Charles-Valentin Alkan and of "Final en si bémol" for organ, op. 21 by César Franck.

Lefébure-Wely resigned his post at the Madeleine in 1858 to devote himself to composing a three-act opéra comique, Les recruteurs. It was premiered at the Opéra-Comique on December 11, 1861, but was not a great success. From 1863 until his death he was the organist at Saint-Sulpice, where the Cavaillé-Coll organ was the largest in France. He died in Paris at the age of 52. Many musicians and other leading figures attended his Requiem Mass. Ambroise Thomas gave the eulogy, in which he said, "Lefébure-Wely has taken his place among the most eminent organists – not only of his time, but of all periods and of all schools!" Lefébure-Wely was buried in Père Lachaise Cemetery; his tomb was designed by the architect Victor Baltard.

Preceded by Georges Schmitt	Titular Organist, Saint Sulpice Paris; 1863–1869	Succeeded by Charles-Marie Widor

== Compositions ==
Lefébure-Wely's first published composition was announced in the weekly journal Bibliographie de la France in their issue of 27 August 1831 as Rondo composé pour le piano-forte par Alfred-Lefebure Wely, âgé de 13 ans, œuv. 1. It was published by Lemoine.

Among his 200 compositions, Lefébure-Wely wrote works for choir, piano, chamber ensemble, and symphony orchestra as well as an opéra comique, Les recruteurs (1861, libretto by Amédée de Jallais and Alphonse Vulpian). His organ pieces include pastorales, versets, élevations, communions, offertories, marches, and sorties."

Lefébure-Wely's compositions include:

- Boléro de concert, op. 166. Régnier-Canaux (1865)
- Meditaciones religiosas op. 122. À sa majesté la reine Doña Isabel II (1858)
- Les Cloches du Monastère, op. 54. Hofmeister's Monatsbericht (1853 or earlier)
- L’Office catholique. 120 Morceaux divisés en dix suites composés pour l'harmonium ou l'orgue à tuyaux, op. 148. Hommage à Monseigneur de la Bouillerie, Évêque de Carcassonne. Régnier-Canaux (1861)
- L’organiste moderne. Collection de morceaux d'orgue dans tous les genres. En 12 livraisons. Hommage à Mr. l'Abbé Hamon, Curé de St. Sulpice. Ces Morceaux ont été écrits sur les Motifs improvisés aux Offices de St. Sulpice (1867–69)
- Six offertoires, op. 34 (ca. 1857)
- Six grands offertoires, op. 35. (ca. 1857)
- Six morceaux pour l'orgue, contenant 3 marches et 3 élévations, op. 36. Graff (1863)
- Six grands offertoires
- Vade-mecum de l'Organiste, op. 187. Entrées et Sorties de Chœur, Versets, Préludes pour Amen, Élévations et Communions, Offertoires, Marches brillantes pour Processions composés pour l'harmonium ou l'orgue à tuyaux (1869)

== General references ==
- Ochse, Orpha (2001). Organists and organ playing in nineteenth-century France and Belgium. Bloomington: Indiana University Press. ISBN 0253214238.
