= Piano Trio No. 1 (Schubert) =

1828 composition by Franz Schubert

Piano Trio
- No. 1
- by Franz Schubert
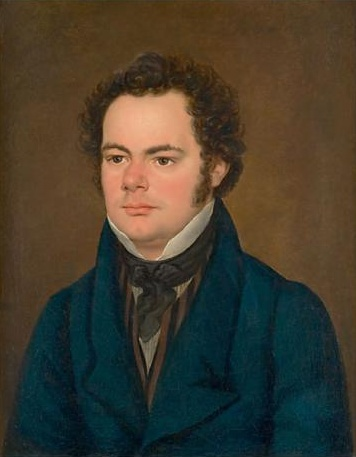
- Schubert in 1827
- Key: B♭ major
- Catalogue: D. 898
- Composed: 1828
- Published: 1836
- Duration: 40 minutes
- Movements: 4

The Piano Trio No. 1 in B♭ major for piano, violin, and cello, D. 898, was written by Franz Schubert in 1827. The composer finished the work in 1828, in the last year of his life. It was published in 1836 as Opus 99, eight years after the composer's death. Like the E♭ major piano trio, it is an unusually large scale work for piano trio, taking around 40 minutes in total to perform.

== Structure ==
The piano trio contains four movements:

1. Allegro moderato
2. Andante un poco mosso
3. Scherzo. Allegro
4. Rondo. Allegro vivace

The first movement (4/4, B♭ major) is in sonata form with two main themes in the exposition. The first theme is characterized by dotted rhythms and irregular phrase lengths, while the second theme by contrast has lyrical melodies and regular phrases. As is typical in a classical piece, the development section expands on both themes, going into remote keys and often becoming turbulent. In the last section of the development, fragmented versions of the main theme are presented in a succession of keys, each closer to the central key than the one before.

The second movement (6/8, E♭ major) is in the style of a gondola song with a lilting melody and swaying rhythm. Like some of Schubert's other late slow movements, there is a contrasting section which is more turbulent. Soon after, however, calm is restored.

The third movement (3/4, B♭ major) is in the classical minuet form. The scherzo proper features heavy counterpoint, with the three instruments constantly imitating each other. The trio section is a relaxed waltz.

The principal theme of the last movement (rondo, 2/4, B♭ major) resembles that of one of Schubert's songs, "Skolie", although this resemblance might be accidental. A two-bar rhythm is prevalent, giving the marked impression of alla breve time rather than 2/4, almost as if Schubert notated it 2/4 to avoid the frequent syncopations (in the equivalent alla breve, the music starts from the weak beat) which, though sounding smooth in actual performance, look clunky and cumbersome on the score. The sections in 2/4 are interrupted three times by passages in 3/2 time, in the style of a polonaise. These give further credence to the theory that the minim is in fact the basic time unit in this movement. The music ends with a coda marked Presto.

== Discography ==
- Alfred Cortot, piano; Jacques Thibaud, violin; Pablo Casals, cello (Kingsway Hall, London, July 5 and 6, 1926; originally released in October 1926 as HMV DB947/50, with US issue as Victor set M 11)
- New York Trio (Clarence Adler, piano; Louis Edlin, violin; Cornelius van Vliet, cello) (May 24, 1928; released late 1928 as Edison Diamond Discs 80898/901; deleted December 31, 1929)
- Leo Nadelmann, piano; Serge Blanc, violin; Leo Rostal, cello (1952), (Musical Masterpiece Society, European subsidiary of Concert Hall Society, MMS-119)
- Eugene Istomin, piano; Isaac Stern, violin; Leonard Rose, cello (1964).
- Trio Dali (Amandine Savary, piano; Jack Liebeck, violin; Christian-Pierre La Marca, cello), (2011).
- Busch Trio (Mathieu van Bellen, violin; Ori Epstein, cello; Omri Epstein, piano), (2022).
- Christian Tetzlaff, violin, Tanja Tetzlaff, cello, and Lars Vogt, piano, (2023).
