= Chickering & Sons =

American former piano manufacturer

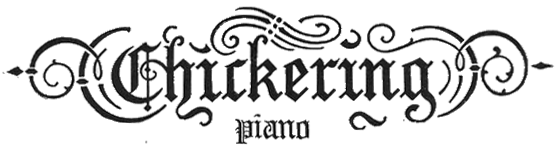
- Type: Private (1823–1983); Brand (1985–?)
- Industry: Musical instruments
- Founded: 1823 in Boston, Massachusetts
- Founder: Jonas Chickering
- Defunct: 1983; 43 years ago
- Headquarters: Boston, Massachusetts, United States
- Products: Pianos

Chickering & Sons was an American piano manufacturer that operated in Boston, Massachusetts, from the 1820s until 1903, when it merged with three others to form American Piano Company. Successor companies sold pianos under the Chickering name until 1985.

== History ==
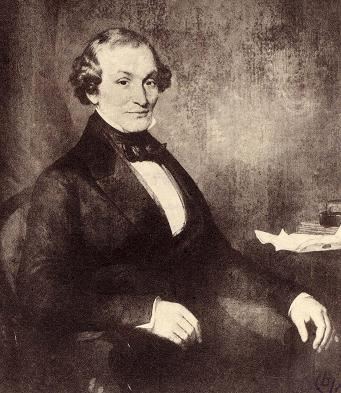
Jonas Chickering, founder.

The company was founded in 1823 by Jonas Chickering and James Stewart, but the partnership dissolved four years later. By 1830, Chickering became partners with John Mackay, manufacturing pianos as "Chickering & Company", and later "Chickering & Mackays" until the senior Mackay's death in 1841, and reorganized as "Chickering & Sons" in 1853.

It was P.T. Barnum who persuaded Jenny Lind — the "Swedish Nightingale" — to make a concert tour of the United States. After her agreement, Barnum commissioned the Chickering company to manufacture a custom grand piano for her nationwide tour, ultimately involving 93 performances. The piano was completed by August 1850; Lind arrived in September and the concert series began in Boston. Her pianist was Otto Goldschmidt, whom she married at the end of her tour.

Coincidentally, as the tour began, Henry E. Steinway (Steinweg) and his large family arrived in New York as immigrants from Germany. Henry attended the opening night of the NYC concert series but showed little interest in the diva. His profound interest was in the Chickering piano, to which he dashed for such careful examination that he nearly had to be hauled away so the concert could begin.

On December 1, 1852, a fire destroyed Chickering's piano factory, located at 336 Washington Street in Boston. While some believe it was arson, most agree it was likely accidental. One policeman was killed. The walls of the building collapsed and set adjoining structures on fire. A new factory was built in 1853–54 at 791 Tremont Street in Boston. From 1860 to 1868, space in the building was the location of the Spencer Repeating Rifle Company, which made over 100,000 rifles and carbines for the U.S. Army and sportsmen from 1862 to 1868. This structure still stands today. It was renovated into artist studios in 1972.

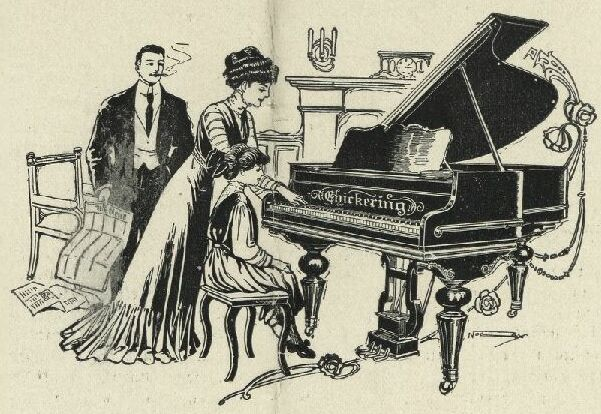
Chickering brand piano pictured in an advertisement in an Indianapolis Maennerchor concert program, March 1912.

Jonas Chickering made several major contributions to the development of piano technology, most notably by introducing a one-piece, cast iron plate to support the greater string tension of larger grand pianos. He also invented a new deflection of the strings, and in 1845, the first convenient method for overstringing in square pianos. Instead of setting the strings side by side, the company introduced substituting an arrangement of the string in two banks, one over the other. This not only saved space but brought the powerful bass strings directly over the most resonant part of the soundboard, a principle used to this day in the construction of all pianos, both grands and uprights.

Chickering was the largest piano manufacturer in the United States in the middle of the 19th century but was surpassed in the 1860s by Steinway. In 1867, Jonas' son Frank Chickering had the Imperial Cross of the Legion of Honour, then one of the world's most prestigious non-military awards, bestowed upon him by Emperor Napoleon III for services to the art of music — one of more than 200 awards the piano manufacturer garnered over the years.

In 1908, the company became part of the American Piano Company (Ampico), and continued after the merger in 1932 of American with the Aeolian Company to form Aeolian-American. That company went out of business in 1985, and the Chickering name continued to be applied to new pianos produced by Wurlitzer and then the Baldwin Piano Company.

== Recordings made with instruments by Chickering ==
- Lambert Orkis. Louis Moreau Gottschalk. Selected Piano Music of Louis Moreau Gottschalk. Label: Smithsonian Collection of Recordings, 1982. Played on a Chickering concert grand piano (1865).
- Dag Achatz. Franz Liszt. Franz Liszt played on Liszt's own piano. Label: BIS. Played on Liszt's Chickering piano (1867).
- Jenő Jandó. Franz Liszt. The Instruments of Liszt in the Budapest Liszt Ferenc Museum. Label: Hungaroton. Played on pianos by Chickering (1867 and 1879-1880), Bösendorfer and other instruments.
- Artem Belogurov. Foote, Whiting, Paine, Chadwick, Nevin, Ruthven Lang. American Romantics: The Boston Scene. Label: Piano Classics. Played on a Chickering piano (1873).

== Chickering Halls ==
The firm commissioned and operated several concert halls in Boston and New York:

- Chickering's building, Boston (c. 1850s), no.334 Washington St.
- Chickering's Hall, Boston (1860-1870), no.246 Washington St.
- Chickering Hall concert auditorium, 130 5th Avenue, New York City (1875), designed by George B. Post, and the venue for Oscar Wilde's first lecture in America in 1882 (razed)
- Chickering Hall, Boston (1883-c. 1894), no.152 Tremont St., near West St.
- Chickering Hall, Boston (1901-c. 1912), Huntington Ave., corner of Massachusetts Ave.
- Chickering Hall, 27 West 57th Street, NYC (1923), designed by Cross & Cross (1924)

== Images ==
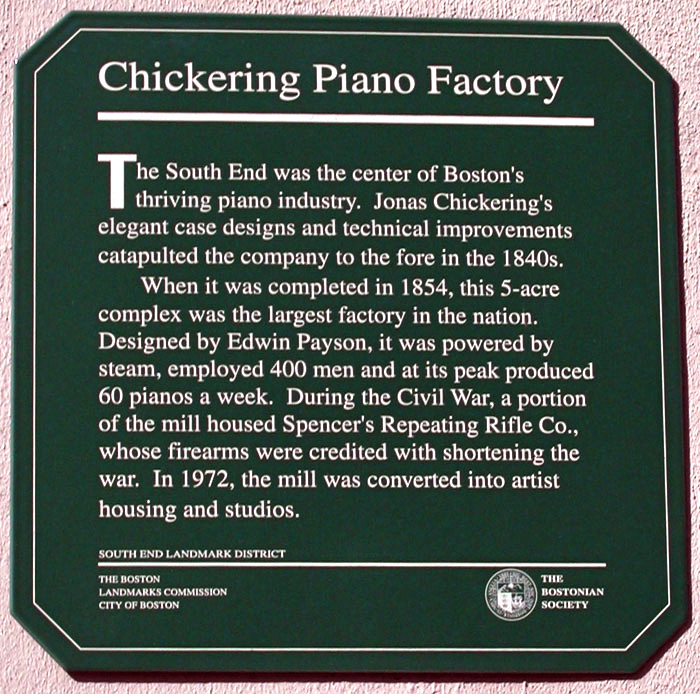
Chickering Piano Factory landmark plaque

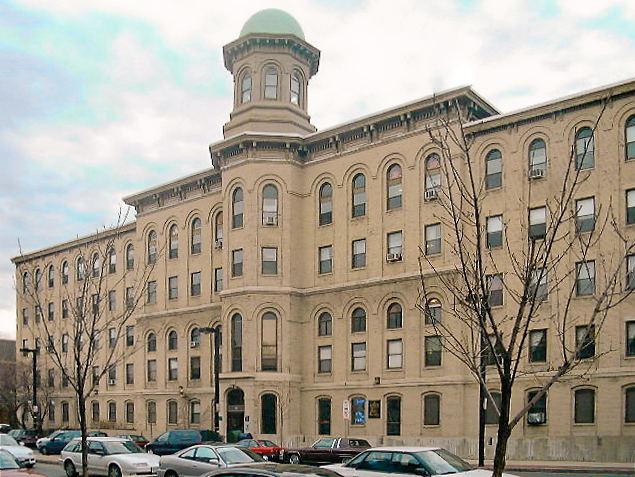
The Chickering factory in 2002, now artist lofts

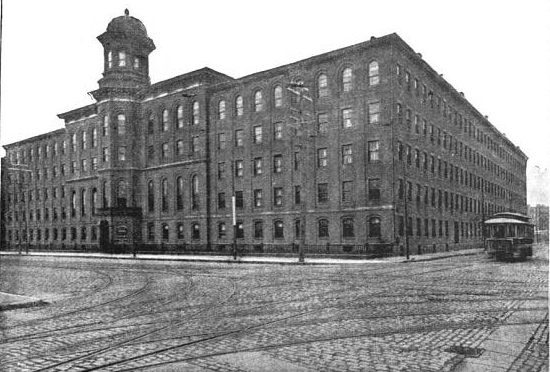
The Chickering factory in 1895.

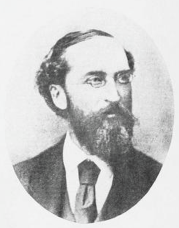
Portrait of George H. Chickering (d.1899)

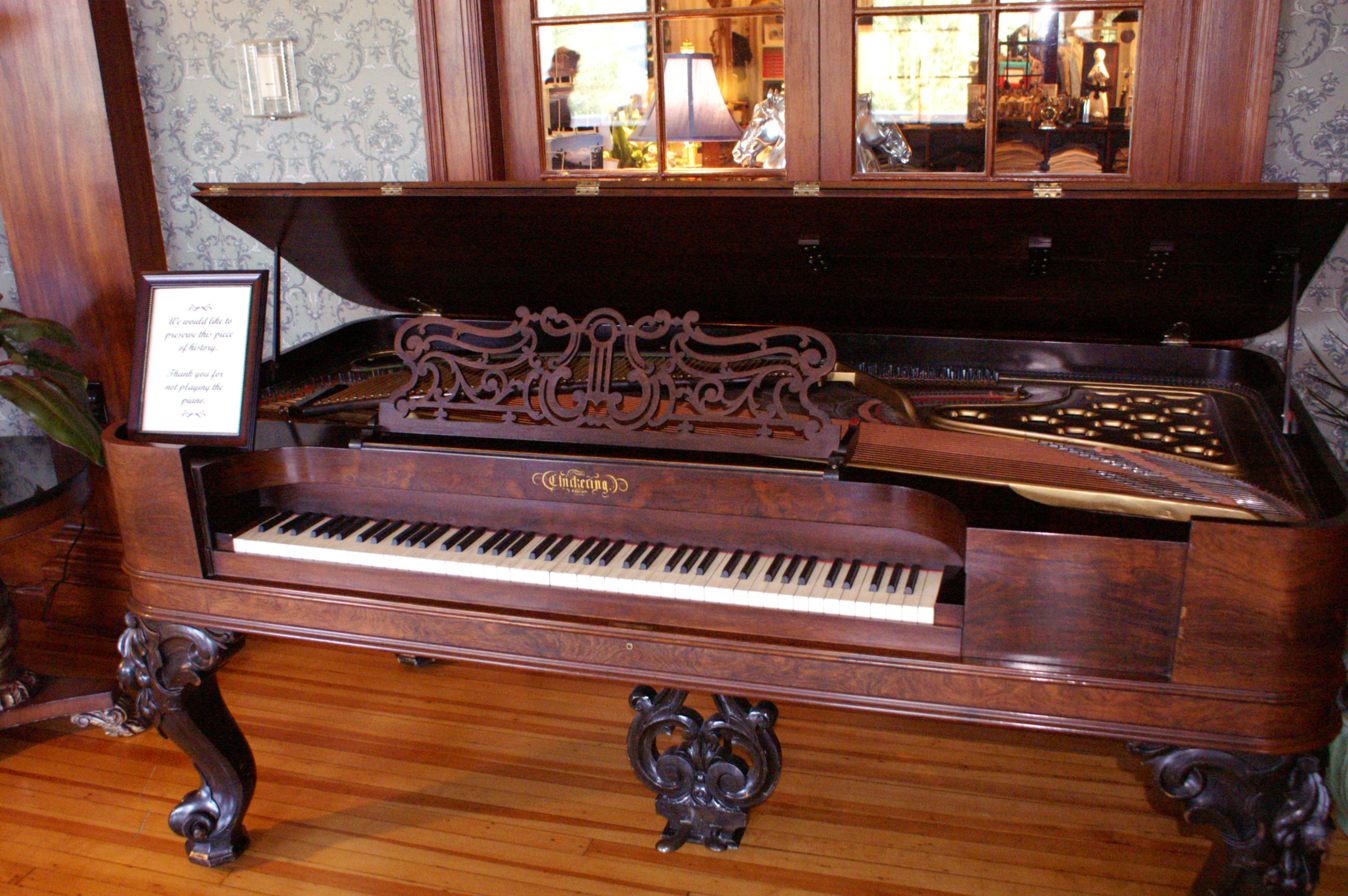
Antique piano at Stanley Hotel (note the "C...e...g" in "Chickering" aligns with the CEG chord on the piano)

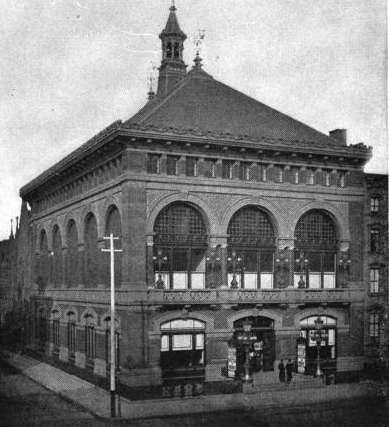
Chickering Hall, New York, no.130 5th Av.

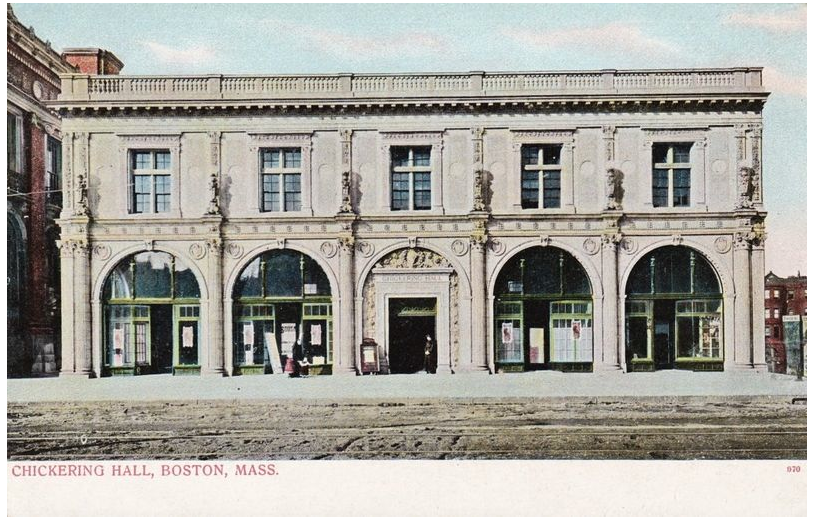
Chickering Hall, Boston, Huntington Ave., c. 1900s

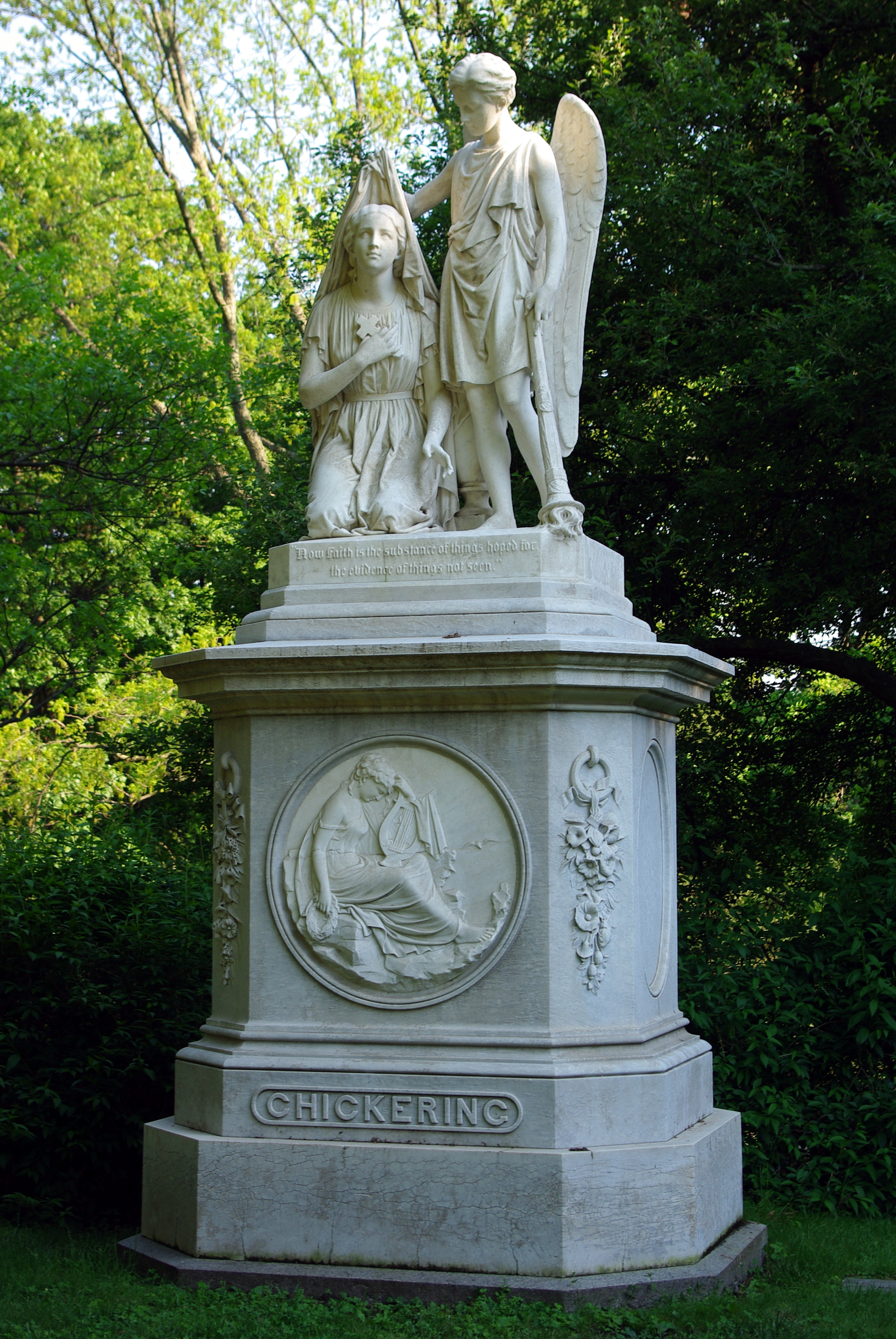
Chickering Monument by Thomas Ball (1872).

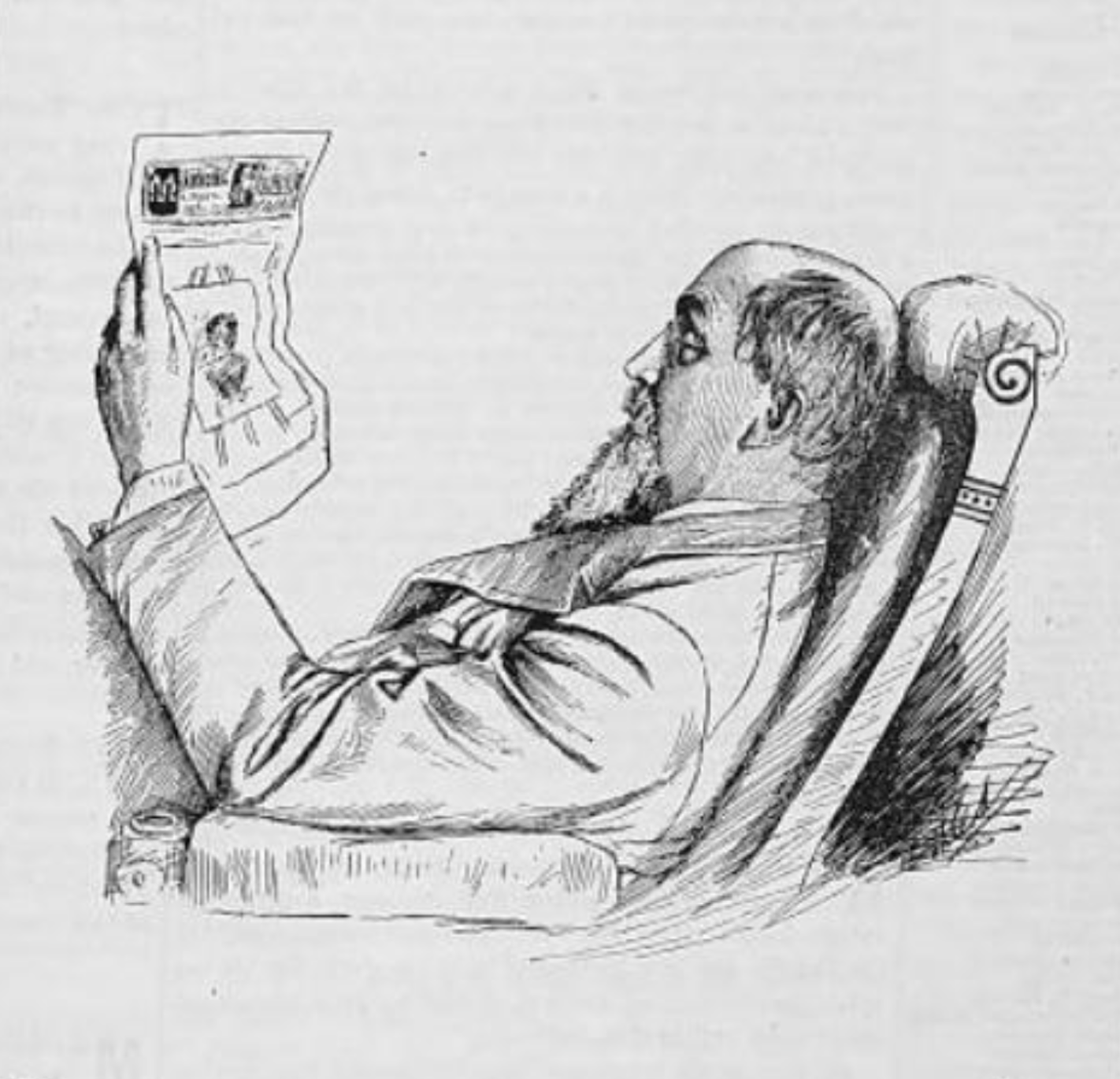
1890 drawing of C. Frank Chickering
