= Dominika Zamara =

Polish soprano

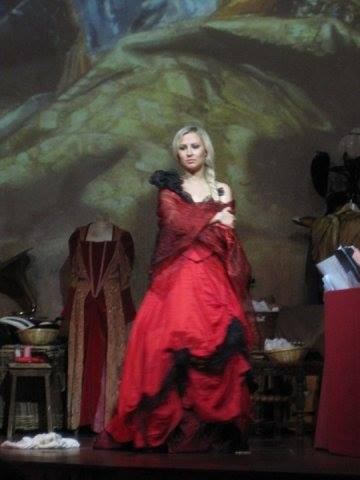
Zamara at the Teatro San Gallo in Venice

Dominika Zamara (born 11 August 1981) is a Polish operatic soprano. She was artistically trained in Italy.

== Life ==
Zamara was born on 11 August 1981 in Wrocław. In 2006, she won a scholarship to the Verona State Conservatory. She took master classes with Bruno Pola, Alida Ferrarini, Enrico De Mori, Mario Melani and Alessandra Althoff Pugliese.

In 2007 she graduated with honours from the Wrocław Music University.

In 2008 and 2009 she toured France with the outstanding organist Fabrice Pitrois. She sang at the National Theater in Montenegro in the presence of the President of Montenegro, with live television coverage. She Made her debut in Padua in the role of Mimì in the opera La Boheme by G. Puccini. In Bari she sang the role of Giorgetta in the first part of the "Triptych" of the opera Il Tabarro by G. Puccini. She also gave numerous concerts accompanied by the Symphony Orchestra conducted by the Italian conductor Enrico De Mori.

In 2010 she gave concerts in Vienna, singing recitals with pianist Caesar Kwapisz with a repertoire composed of Italian opera arias and songs by Polish romantic composers. She also performed the sacred works of Gloria and Laudate pueri by Antonio Vivaldi, with concerts during the Venice Film Festival and at the Biennale and in many Italian cities accompanied by the Symphony Orchestra conducted by Paolo Fumei.

In 2011 She sang the main part in the world premiere of the opera Un Tramonto by Gaetano Coronaro, conducted by Stefano Carlini, at the Teatro Olimpico di Vicenza in Italy. She also gave numerous concerts, recitals and opera festivals singing in most of Europe: all over Italy, France during the Festival of Sacred Music, with the organist Fabrice Petroise, in Austria (Vienna and Salzburg), Poland, Germany, England, La Palma in Spain.

In 2012 - She played the role of Silvia in the opera Zanetto by P. Mascagni in Vicenza. - She then makes her US debut at the Warner Grand Theatre in Los Angeles, performing with Disney composer Maria Newman and the Chamber Orchestra of Hollywood. - She also gives concerts in Malibu, New York and Eureka Springs in Arkansas with the International Symphony Orchestra conducted by Thomas Chun-yu Chen and at the Cica Music Festival in Dallas.

In 2013 - She sings in Rome during the Great Charity Gala: "A heart for all, all for one heart" at the Teatro Orione with great names of the Italian scene, this event was broadcast on television. - He performed sacred music in Pietrelcina, in the Basilica of Padre Pio, accompanied by Vince Tempera. - During the Grand Gala in Vienna, she receives the Zlote Sowa prize - a European Oscar in the category of music - for his outstanding artistic achievements in classical music. - In Italy she plays the role of Rosina in the opera Il Barbiere di Siviglia by G. Rossini conducted by Paolo Fumei. - She toured the United States performing opera arias arranged for classical guitar and contemporary music with professor and classical guitarist Stanley Alexandrowicz, giving concerts in Boston, Washington D. C., Princeton (New Jersey), New York, Philadelphia and Baltimore.

In Dallas (Texas) she sings Puccini arias with a symphony orchestra at the important Cica Music Festival. Debuts at New York's prestigious Lincoln Center in David Geffen (Avery Fisher) Hall, with a 134-member orchestra. This concert was presented by Kevin Spacey, winner of two Oscars. - In Italy she performed the title role of Serpina in the opera La Serva Padrona by G. B. Pergolesi in many opera houses accompanied by the orchestra conducted by Maestro Claudio Colmanet. - In Morcone, she received the International Padre Pio Prize for her artistic achievements.

In 2014 - Performed the title role in the contemporary opera La Serva di Padova by Vincenzo Faggiano, at the Teatro Verdi in Padua. - Recorded for television (TV CREMONA) the concert: Laudate Pueri by A. Vivaldi and Exsultate, jubilate by W. A. Mozart, with the orchestra La Certosa conducted by Paolo Fumei. A DVD of this concert was produced by the same television channel. - She sings at the Evmelia classical music festival in Greece with the pianist Ramzi Shomali. - She gives concerts of the Stabat Mater by G. B. Pergolesi in churches in Italy together with the orchestra La Certosa conducted by Paolo Fumei. - In Cremona, she received the A.N.L.A.I. prize 2014. - She performs in New York and New Jersey with the New Jersey Baroque Orchestra, conducted by Robert W. Butts, - She made her Latin American debut singing in Mexico in one of the most important Latin American theatres, the Manuel M. Ponce Hall with the pianist Alejandro Barranón.

In 2015 - She performed the role of Serpina in the opera La Serva Padrona y G. B. Pergolesi at the prestigious Teatro San Domenico in the city of Crema under the direction of Robert W. Butts. - She sings in Rome in the academic concert hall of the Pontifical Institute of Sacred Music in the presence of the Cardinals of the Vatican. - She also sings a recital for Cremona 1 Television accompanied on the piano by Andrea Musso. - She toured China with arias by Verdi and Puccini with the Zhuhai Symphony Orchestra conducted by Thomas Chun-yu Chen. - She sings at the Assisi Cathedral, during the Festival Assori Suono Sacro, under the direction of Roberto Miele of the Teatro La Scala in Milan. The concert was broadcast by the Italian TV RAI. - She sings at the Cracow Sacred Night Festival. - She performed the role of Serpina in Pergolesi's opera La serva Padrona at the Opera Theatre of New Jersey under the direction of Robert W. Butts. - She sings at the Polish Embassy in Rome in the presence of the President of the Polish Republic, Andrzej Duda.

In 2016 - She performed at the Polish-American concert of Christmas songs at the Church of Our Lady of Perpetual Help in Rome. - She begins a tour of South Korea performing at the Royal Azalea Blossom Festival Final Concert, with the Prime Philharmonic Orchestra in Seoul and a symphony orchestra conducted by Maestro Daniel Park in Busan. - In Italy, she opens an international recital at the Festival Biennale Arte Dolomiti. - Performed at Assisi Festival Assisi Suono Sacro. - Performed at the Sacred Night Festival in Kraków during the World Youth Days in the presence of Pope Francis, accompanied by flautist Andrea Ceccomori. - She returns to New Jersey to play the role of Susanna in the opera the Marriage of Figaro by W. A. Mozart conducted by Robert W. Butts for the opening of the Summer Opera Music Festival, - She performs in the season of the Henryk Wieniawski Teatro Filarmonico of Lublin in Poland.

In 2017 - Gives a benefit concert at the Teatro San Carlino in Brescia for Italian television. - Performs at the Festival Mozart Nacht und Tag IX in Turin. - Performs at the Sanctuary of San Michele Arcangelo di Foggia (Heritage Unesco) where she receives the international Tree of Life prize sculpture awarded for outstanding artistic achievement in Italy, - Receives the title of Honorary Vice President of the International Acceptus Mundi Onlus Foundation. - In Romania records a DVD (AA VV.) with the Ploiești Philharmonic Orchestra conducted by Samer Hatoum. - Opens the "Chopin Forever" Festival with a recital in San Gemini. - Sings at the Festival Internazionale Asisa in Madrid accompanied on piano by Franco Moro in the presence of pianist Joaquín Achúcarro - In Tallinn, she sings at the Alion Baltic Music Festival with the symphony orchestra conducted by Grigory Soroko. - She participates again in the Festival Cracovia Noche Sacra in Kraków. - Performed at the Festival of Sacred Music in Sigean, France. - Performed in Olsztyn, Poland for the Jacob's Concert with the company of virtuoso musicians Jarosław Ciecierski and Silvano Rodi, an event televised by TVP Olsztyn.

Besides her performances, she works as an instructor of lyrical singing at the Accademia Musicale La Certosa of Nervesa della Battaglia

=== Repertoire ===
Her repertoire ranges from Baroque music to contemporary and includes complete works, sacred music, and lieder.

She sings in Italian, French, English, Polish, German, Russian, Czech, Slovak and Latin.

== Discography ==
- 2009 - DREAMS
- 2012 - LIFE - producido por Edit Music Italy
- 2015 - IVAN PADOVEC, works for soprano and guitar - producido por Sheva Collection
- Il Concerto - producido por Cremona1
