= Ivan Padovec =

Croatian guitar virtuoso

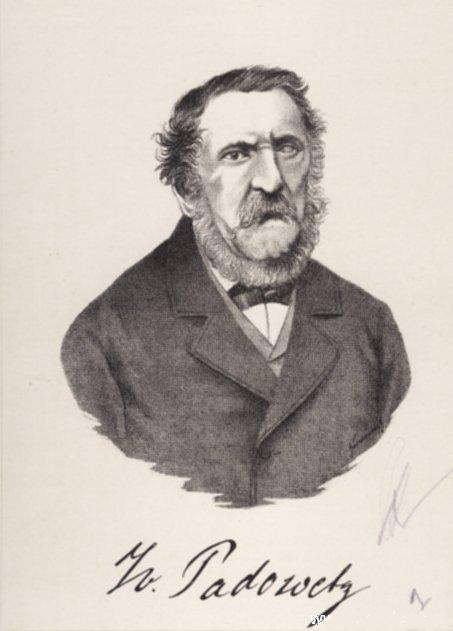
Ivan Padovec

Ivan Eugen Padovec (also known as Johann Padowetz; 17 July 1800 – 4 November 1873) was a Croatian guitar virtuoso. He was born in Varaždin in Habsburg monarchy (now Croatia). He gave concerts in Zagreb, Vienna, Prague, Budapest, Hamburg, London, etc. He constructed a ten-string guitar. Also, his Theoretisch-praktische Guitarrschule was published by Werner & Comp. in Vienna around 1844.

== List of works ==
=== Orchestral compositions ===
- Premier Concertino in C-major, for guitar and strings
1. Allegro moderato
2. Andante
3. Rondo. Allegretto
- Second Concertino in F-major, for guitar and strings
1. Allegro moderato
2. Andante sostenuto
3. Polacca
- Introduction und Variationen über ein Thema aus der Oper 'Die Kreuzritter' for guitar and orchestra consisted of a string quintet, two flutes, two oboes, two clarinets, two bassoons, French horn, trumpet and timpani

=== Compositions for two guitars ===
Among Padowetz's five guitar duets, four of them (op.3, op.10 and op.18) require one terz-guitar.

- Der Carneval von Venedig mit concertanten Variationen, Op.62
- Deux polonaises Op.3
1. Polonaise Op.3 No.1
2. Polonaise Op.3 No.2
- Premier grand rondeau Op.10
- Première grande polonaise Op.18

=== Compositions for solo guitar ===
Padowetz composed a large amount of guitar solos: numerous demanding works in forms of variations and fantasias mainly on operatic themes (most of them published in Vienna and some in Paris), but also a lot of short and easy pieces which mainly remained in manuscripts.

- Moderato
- Mazurka
- Rondoletto Op.53
- 6 Easy Pieces Op.6
1. Marsch
2. Monferino
3. Thema
4. Polonaise
5. Ungarischer
6. (untitled)
- Introduction et variations sur un air national hongrois Op.9
- Introduction et variations sur un thême favoris de l'opera (Donizetti's Lucrezia Borgia) Op.61
- Introduction und Variationen für die Guitare über die beliebte Cavatine (L'amo ah l'amo e m'e pio cara, from Bellini's opera Montechi u. Capuleti) Op.13
- Variations brillantes Op.2
- Variations pour la guitare sur l'air (Quant je quittai la Normandie = Eh ich die Normandie verlassen, from Giacomo Meyerbeer's opera Robert le diable) Op.25
- Variations sur la valse favorite de Franz Schubert Op.4
- Introduction & Variations (on a theme from Bellini's Sonnambula) Op.52
- Fantasy Op.23
- Variations Op.1
- Introduction & Variations Op.14
- Variations Op.16

== CD Recordings ==
- Variations sur in valse favorit de Fr. Schubert, Op. 4, performed by Karl Michelson (Sapere Aude Record, CD, 2021)
- Musings (Duo Erato (Martha Masters & Risa Carlson))
- Ivan Padovec – Joyful music for guitar (Darko Petrinjak & Maroje Brčić) link
- Ivan Eugen Padovec: The Longing (Aulos Varaždin) link
- Ivan Padovec – Chaplet of Songs (Aulos Varaždin) link
- Ivan Padovec 2000 (Aulos Varaždin) link
- Ivan Padovec - Work for soprano and guitar 2015 (Dominika Zamara sopran, Stanley Alexandrowicz)
