= George Aspull =

English musician (1813–1832)

George Aspull (June 1813 – 19 August 1832) was an English musician.

== Biography ==
Aspull was born at Manchester in June 1813, the ninth of ten sons of Thomas Aspull, a merchant who had failed in business and gained his living by teaching music and playing the violin. He began to learn the piano under his father's instruction on 1 February 1821, and both played and sang at a concert in January 1822. In February of the following year Kalkbrenner, having heard him play at Liverpool, advised his father to take him to London, and April he played to Clementi.

Aspull soon became quite the rage in London. On 20 February 1824 he went to Windsor Castle to play before George IV, and he gave numerous concerts which attracted large audiences. At a concert at Brighton he played (for the first time in England) Weber's 'Concertstück.'

In April 1825 Aspull and his father went to Paris, where they met Johann Nepomuk Hummel and Ignaz Moscheles. On his return he began a series of concert tours in Great Britain and Ireland, which lasted, almost without intermission to the end of his life. On Clementi's death in 1832 Aspull came up to London to attend the funeral, on which occasion he caught a cold which eventually caused his death.

In spite of his illness Aspull played at Chesterfield and Newark, and then drove up to London in an open gig to attend concerts given by John Field, Moscheles, and Mendelssohn. He was able to go to the first of these concerts, but his illness increased so alarmingly that he was immediately afterwards taken to Tunbridge Wells, where he was prostrated by fever. Becoming slightly better he was brought back to London and then taken to Leamington, but he gradually sank and died on Sunday, 19 August 1832. He was buried at Nottingham. Besides his performances on the piano, Aspull used to sing at his concerts, having a sweet, if not very powerful, tenor voice. Aspull had a significant coin collection, auctioned in London by Wheatley on 15-16 December 1836; a copy of the catalogue is held at Cambridge University Library (shelfmark Munby.c.154(6)).

== Works ==
Aspull wrote a small amount of pianoforte music and some songs; these were published after his death by his father, together with a memoir and portrait.
