= Franz von Walsegg =

German aristocrat (1763–1827)

- Born: 17 January 1763; Stuppach near Gloggnitz, Lower Austria
- Died: 11 November 1827 (aged 64); Stuppach, Lower Austria, Austrian Empire
- Spouse: Anna Walsegg

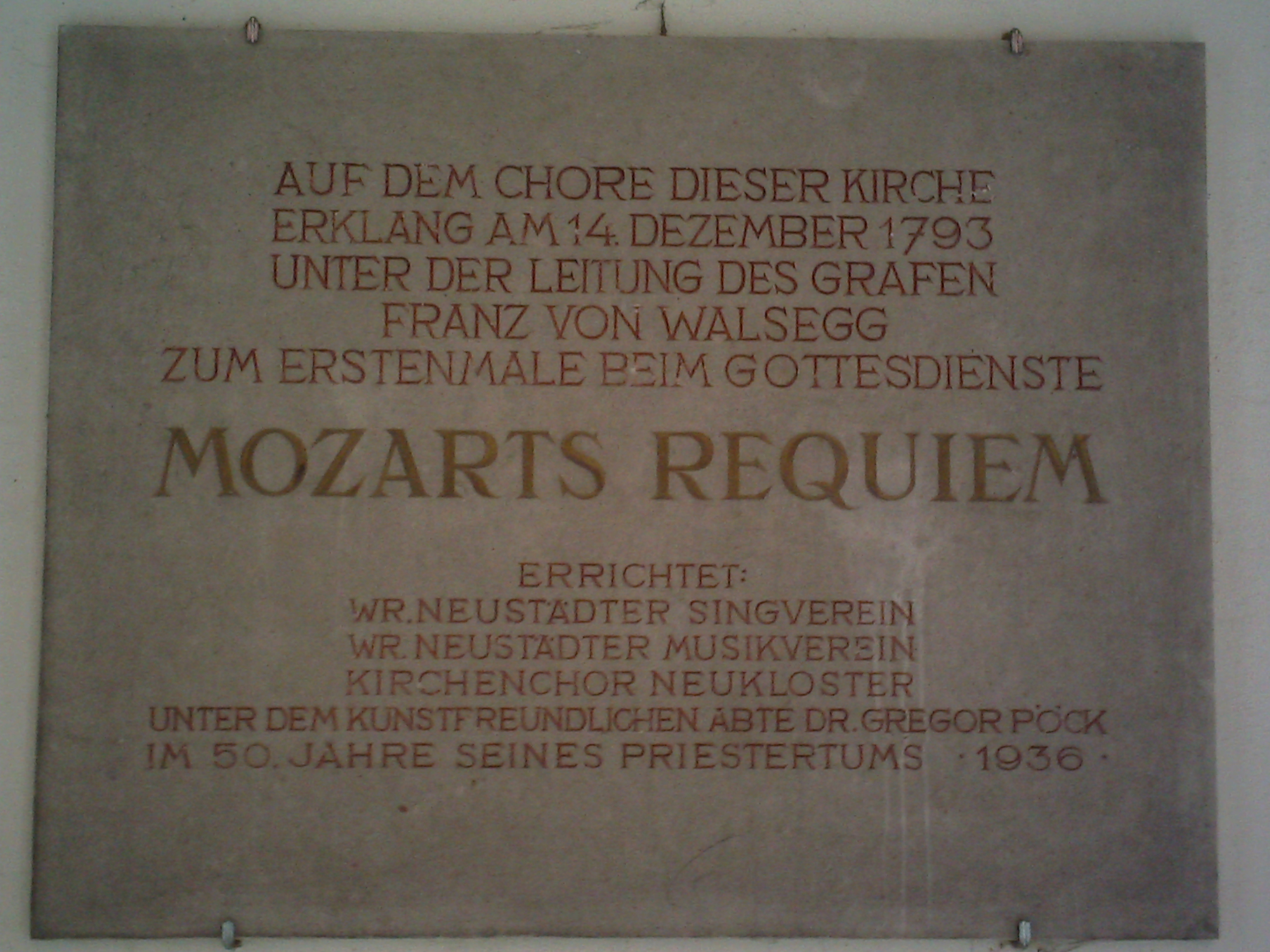
Plaque in Wiener Neustadt marking the 14 December 1793 performance of the Requiem, with Walsegg's name

Count Franz von Walsegg (January 17, 1763 – November 11, 1827) was a German aristocrat, living in Stuppach Castle near Gloggnitz, who is best remembered for having commissioned a Requiem Mass from Wolfgang Amadeus Mozart in 1791 following the death of his twenty-year-old wife Anna (the grieving count, only 28 himself at the time, would never remarry). A Freemason and amateur musician, Walsegg had a penchant for commissioning works from composers of the day and then passing them off as his own in private performances. In his account of the commission of the Requiem Mass from Mozart, Anton Herzog states:

Herr Franz, Count von Walsegg... was a passionate lover of music and the theatre; hence, every week, on Tuesdays and Thursdays... quartets were played... So that we would not lack for new quartets, in view of so frequent productions of them, Herr Count not only procured all those publicly announced but was in touch with many composers, yet without ever revealing [their] identit[ies]... they delivered to him works of which he retained the sole ownership, and for which he paid well. To name one man, Herr Hoffmeister...

—

Although Mozart died before completing the Requiem, Constanze Mozart arranged for several other composers, most notably Franz Xaver Süssmayr, to complete the work in order to gain the remainder of the sum Walsegg had promised.
