= Luigi Hugues =

Italian composer

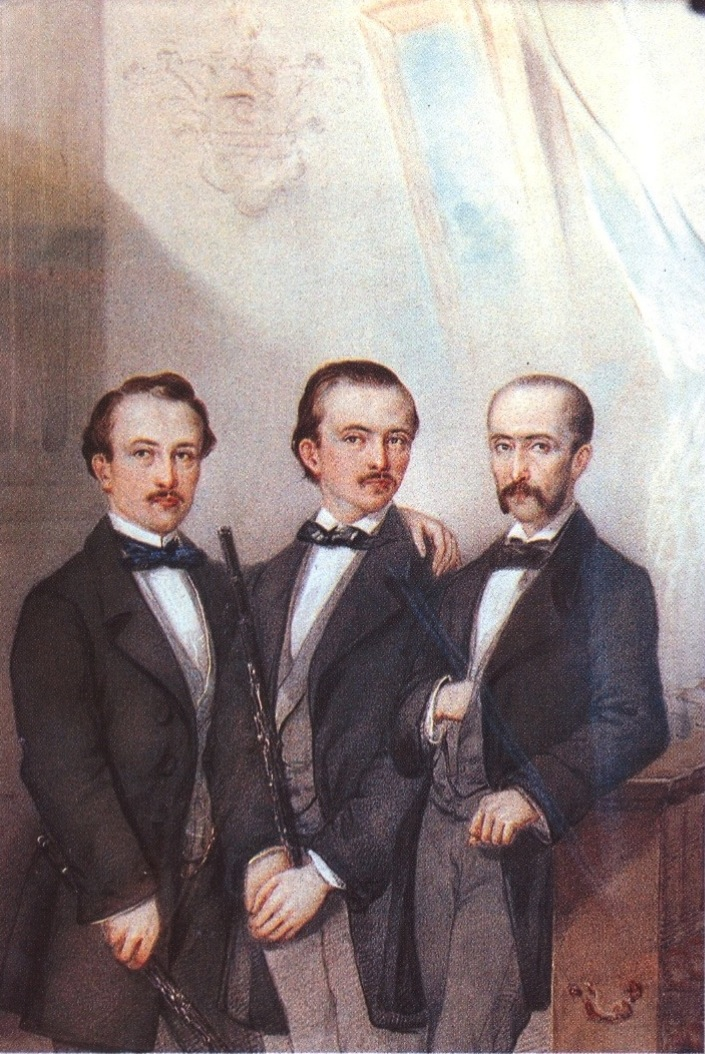
Anonymous Piedmontese 19th century, Trio Hugues: (from left) Celestino Hugues, Felice Hugues and Luigi Hugues.

Luigi Hugues (27 October 1836 – 5 March 1913) was an Italian academic geographer and accomplished amateur musician. He is best known today as a composer and arranger of virtuoso works for the flute, and for his contributions to the teaching and history of geography.

Hugues was born in Casale Monferrato, today in the Province of Alessandria, Piedmont. He trained originally as an engineer, and taught in various technical institutes before becoming a professor of geography within the Faculty of Letters at the University of Turin in 1897.

Luigi Hugues died in Casale Monferrato at the age of 76. Viale Luigi Hugues, a street in Turin, is named in his honour.

Although Hugues’ musical works are recognized for their instrumental virtuosity, they are not always taken entirely seriously. Flautist and teacher Fenwick Smith refers to their “brilliance and vacuity” and writes of the Grand Concert Fantasy on Verdi’s Ballo in Maschera:

“With a flutist’s knowledge of the instrument, which permits him to conjure more notes per square inch than Verdi ever dreamed of, and with the Italians’ sure sense of drama, Hugues has concocted a paragon among potboilers.”
