= La Serneta =

Spanish flamenco singer (1837–1912)

La Serneta (1837 in Jerez de la Frontera – 1910 in Utrera) was a famous Spanish flamenco singer (cantaora). She was seminal in soleares style. Her real name was Mercedes Fernández Vargas and she was a very popular celebrity in flamenco cafés.
