= John Addison (1765–1844) =

English composer and double-bass player (1765–1844)

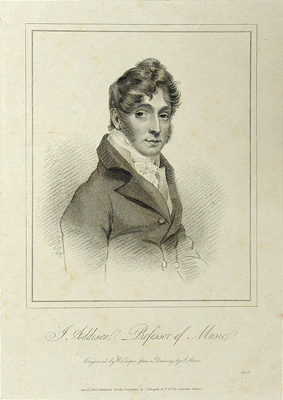
John Addison, engraved by Robert Cooper from a drawing by Joseph Slater, 1819

John Addison (c. 1765 – 30 January 1844) was an English composer and double-bass player.

Addison was born, lived, and died in London. He wrote six operettas which were very popular at the time, including, Sacred Drama, Elijah and Songs and Glees. He also authored a book on singing instruction, Singing Practically Treated in a Series of Instructions (1836). Addison's song, "The Woodland Maid" was included among sixteen entries in William Alexander Barrett's fifth volume of Standard English Songs.
