= Marc Burty =

French composer (1827–1903)

Marc Burty (French: [maʁk byʁti]; 18 February 1827, Lyon – 2 February 1903, Lyon) was a French composer and music teacher for Lycée de Lyon who also went by the pseudonym, Georges Bull, in some of his works. He became interested in the harmonium after building a relationship with Alfred Lefébure-Wély in Paris who introduced him to the instruments, in which Burty later taught the instrument in the Lyon-based institution. He mainly wrote music pieces for the piano and were published in Paris between 1859 and 1900.

== Legacy ==
In America, his works were considered to be well-adapted for teaching purposes.

== Compositions ==
(Most of the catalogue is from Marc Burty's entry in the Bibliothèque nationale de France.)

- A la belle étoile
- Au gré du vent
- Au pays de Bohème
- Au Temps passé, gavotte pour piano
- Aubade à Grand'maman
- Aux Alpes
- batteurs de blé
- Bonhomme Jadis
- Chanson de chasse
- Chant du Soldat. Romance dramatique. Paroles de Léon Rayssac
- Charité divine. Mélodie. Paroles de F. Barrillot
- De profundis d'amour
- Dernier soleil
- îles d'or
- Il faut partir (Note: Rearrange from a romance sung by Marie in La fille du régiment by Gaetano Donizetti.)
- Jeune France
- Lutins et farfadets
- Menuet villageois
- Noces de Figaro de W. A. Mozart fantaisie transcription [pour piano], op. 34
- L'Oiseau du Paradis (Note: Published in English as The Pilgrim Bird, it was known with subpar translation from French into English.)
- Pas d'armes marche des chevaliers, pour piano à 4 mains
- Pauvre Isabeau
- Pendant l'étape
- Perle de Cadix
- Petit Noël, chant des bergers
- Petite fanfare, marche
- Petite reine
- Pied d'alouette, caprice-polka
- Pizzicato
- Polka mazurka de la dame de carreau pour le piano
- Pour endormir l'enfant. Berceuse. Paroles de Madame Desbordes-Valmore
- Premières neiges mazurka pour piano
- Princesse des Canaries fantaisie espagnole pour piano, op. 35
- Pupilles du régiment, pas redoublé
- Quand viendra la saison nouvelle Villanelle. Poésie de Théophile Gautier
- Reine des bois styrienne pour piano
- Retraite russe
- Révérences de cour, menuet
- Robe et jeune fille. Paroles de S. et F. Borel
- Roche aux mouettes. Grande valse brillante pour piano par P. Granger. Edition à 4 mains par Marc Burty
- Rose de mai valse légère pour piano
- Rose de Noël, mazurka
- Sage et le fou
- Sans façon, galop
- Scènes et paysages. 30 morceaux faciles pour piano par Georges Bull et Marc Burty
- Simples croquis [pour piano]
- Sonatines
- Souvenir de Petsth fantaisie polka, caprice hongrois pour piano
- Transcription brillante sur "Le jour et la nuit"
- Tribut de Zamora, opéra de Ch. Gounod, fantaisie brillante pour piano. Op. 32
- Troïka mazurka russe pour piano 6 mains
- Trompettes et clairons fanfare pour piano à 4 mains
- Tu me regretteras ! Mélodie. Paroles de Ph. Théolier
- Vers la rive fleurie, marine
- Vieilles dentelles, menuet pour piano
- vieux monsieur de l'orchestre. Scène Comique.... Paroles de H. Lefebvre
- Vin blanc. Paroles de Camille Roy
- Vous feriez pleurer le Bon Dieu mélodie. Poésie de F. Barrillot
- Warther, drame lyrique de J. Massonet, petite transcription très facile [pour piano]
- Yvan, chanson cosaque
