= Carlotta Ferrari =

Italian composer

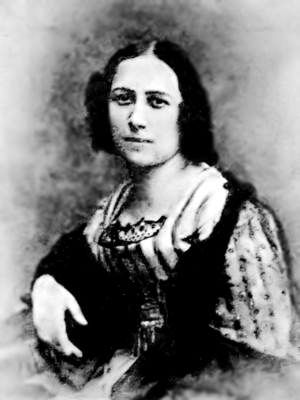
Carlotta Ferrari

Carlotta Ferrari (27 January 1831 – 22 November 1907) was an Italian composer, poet, pianist and singer, noted for opera. She wrote her first opera Ugo at the age of twenty. Faced with a lack of interest, she raised funds for its first public production in Lecco and conducted the performances herself. In April 1875, Ferrari was made an honorary professor of composition at the Philharmonic Academy of Bologna, upon the recommendation of Ambroise Thomas. Besides songs and opera, she published an autobiography and poetry and prose works in four volumes titled Versi e prose in Bologna from 1878 to 1882.

== Life ==
Carlotta Ferrari was born in Lodi, Austrian Empire, and studied singing and piano at the Milan Conservatory with Giuseppina Strepponi and composing with Alberto Mazzucato. Ferrari wrote her first opera Ugo at the age of twenty. Faced with a lack of interest, due to the fact she was a woman, she raised funds for its first public production in Lecco and conducted the performances herself. It was a success; critics at the time referred to her as "the Italian Sappho" and "a Bellini in skirts", referring to "her polished verses and the fluency of her melodies". Ferrari was commissioned by the Turin government to write a cantata, and then a requiem mass for King Charles Albert. In April 1875, Ferrari was made an honorary professor of composition at the Philharmonic Academy of Bologna, upon the recommendation of Ambroise Thomas. Besides songs and opera, she published an autobiography and poetry and prose works in four volumes titled Versi e prose in Bologna from 1878 to 1882. She had a wide range of literary interests, publishing an opera Il vicario di Wakefield based on Oliver Goldsmith's novel The Vicar of Wakefield.

Ferrari died in Bologna on 22 November 1907.

== Works ==
Ferrari was a successful composer within her lifetime. She composed operas and cantatas and piano pieces. Selected works include:

- Requiem Mass
- Ugo, opera
- Sofia, opera
- Eleonora d'Arborea, opera
