= John Hoyland (organist) =

British musician (1783–1827)

John Hoyland (1783 – 18 January 1827) was an English organist and composer. He was the son of a cutler in Sheffield and studied with William Mather, organist of St. James Church, Sheffield. In 1808 he replaced his master as organist there. In 1819 he moved to Louth in Lincolnshire, initially as a teacher but soon as organist there. His son William Hoyland was organist of the same church from 1829 until his death in 1857.
