= Franz Joseph Antony =

- Born: 1790; Münster
- Died: 1837 (aged 46–47)
- Occupation: Choral composer

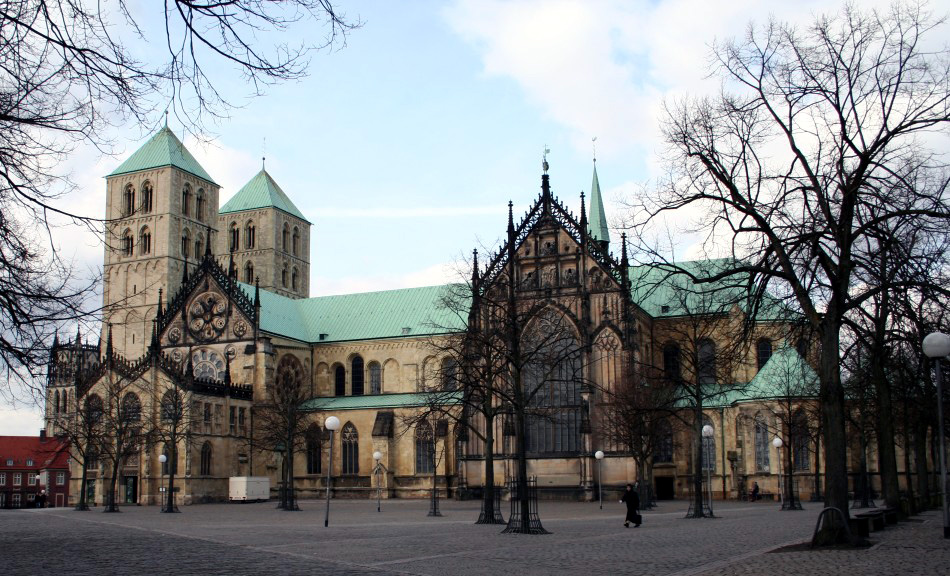
St Paul's Cathedral, Münster

Franz Joseph Antony (1790–1837) was a choral composer.

He was born at Münster, Westphalia, received Holy Orders, and in 1819 became choirmaster at St. Paul's Cathedral in Münster, succeeding his father as organist, in 1832. In addition to some songs, he published four choral masses. His erudite works are Archäologisch-liturgisches Gesangbuch des Gregorianischen Kirchengesanges (1829) and Geschichtliche Darstellung der Entstehung und Vervollkommnung der Orgel (1832).
