= Ferdinand Quentin Dulcken =

German composer and pianist

Ferdinand Quentin Dulcken (1 June 1837– 10 December 1901) was a German composer and pianist.

Dulcken was born in London, the son of pianist Louise Dulcken (the sister of Ferdinand David) and Theobald Dulcken. He was related to the famous Dulcken family of Flemish German harpsichord makers. His mother was the first female pianist to perform with the London Philharmonic Orchestra. Ferdinand Dulcken was a pupil of Moscheles and Gade at the Leipzig Conservatory, and also received encouragement from Mendelssohn.

He taught at the Warsaw Conservatory for five years, and also in Moscow and St. Petersburg, and made many concert tours in Europe as a pianist with Wieniawski, Vieuxtemps and others.

He moved to the United States in 1876, giving concerts with Remenyi and also with Julie Rivé-King, acting as the director of her Rivé-King troupe for a time. Dulcken, along with other members of the troupe, was injured in a train derailment in Toledo, Ohio, on 30 March 1881. He married Mary Toten of Bowery Bay in 1884 and they settled in Astoria, Queens, where they lived in a house that stood on present day 31st Avenue between 31st and 32nd Streets. The house was demolished in 2018. He worked as a teacher and educator at Steinway Hall, and as a composer, publishing nearly 400 piano pieces and also some vocal works.

He died in 1901 aged 64, probably in Astoria.
