= Chickering Hall (Boston, 1901) =

Auditorium in Boston, Massachusetts, US

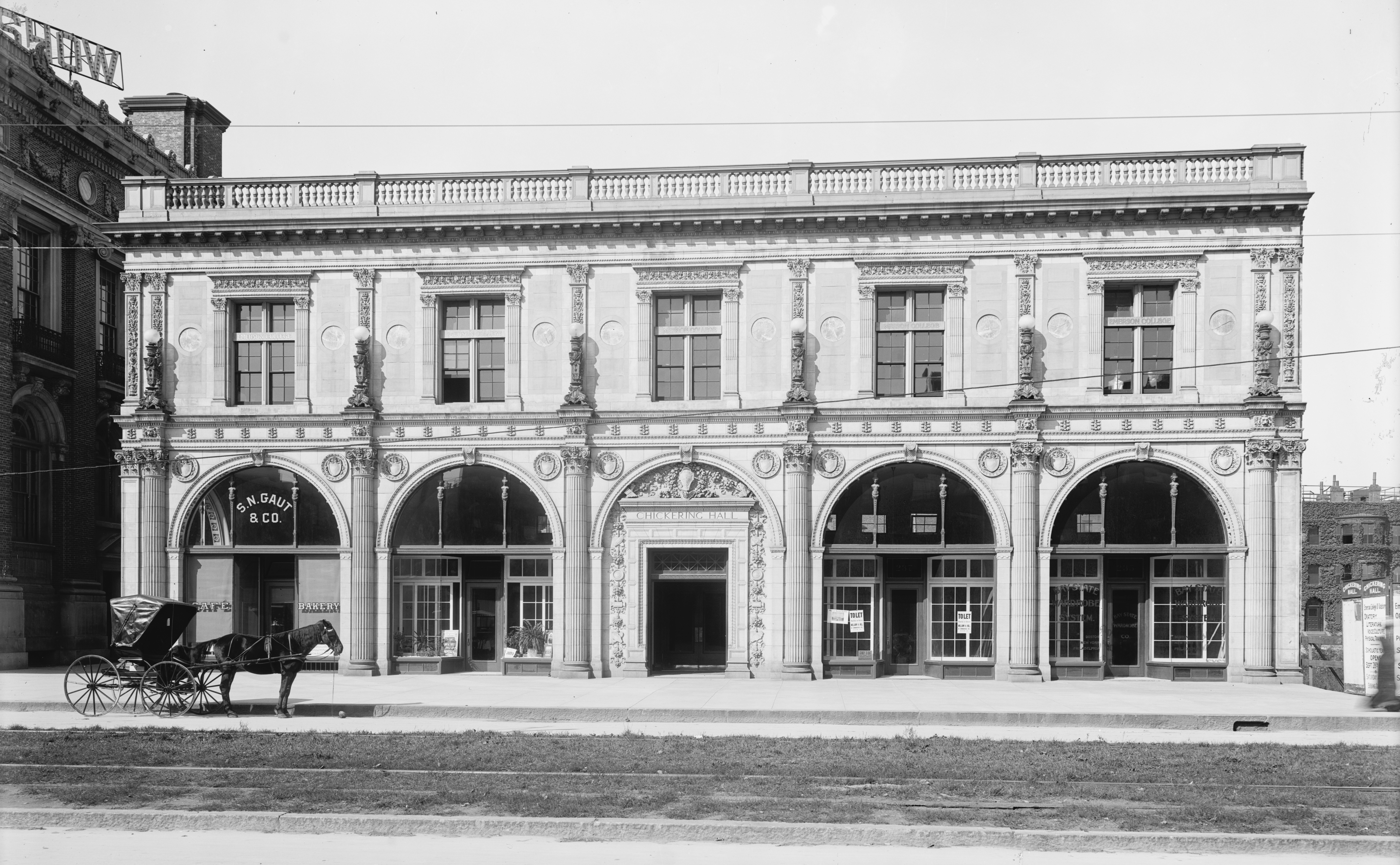
- 1900s
- Interactive map of the Chickering Hall area

General information
- Location: Boston, Massachusetts, Huntington Avenue
- Coordinates: 42°20′37.27″N 71°5′4.37″W
- Completed: 1901 (125 years ago)
- Demolished: 1912 (114 years ago)

Technical details
- Floor count: 2

Chickering Hall (1901–1912) was an auditorium in Boston, Massachusetts, located on Huntington Avenue in the Back Bay. It stood adjacent to Horticultural Hall. Tenants included the Emerson College of Oratory and D.M. Shooshan's "Ladies' and Gents' Cafe." In 1912 it became the St. James Theatre, and later the Uptown Theatre. The building existed until 1963, when it was demolished.

== Performances ==
- Opening concert, with Antoinette Szumowska, Pol Plançon, Kneisel Quartet
- Lucy Gates, soprano
- Florizel, boy violinist
- Ossip Gabrilowitsch, pianist
- The Merchant of Venice, with Ben Greet English Co.
- W. B. Yeats plays, with Margaret Wycherly
- Beatrice Herford

== Images ==
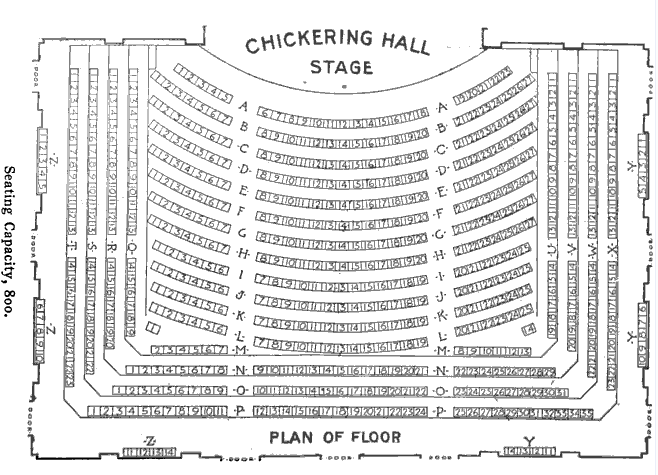
Floorplan

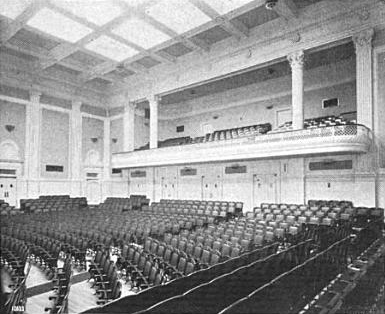
Inside Chickering Hall c. 1903

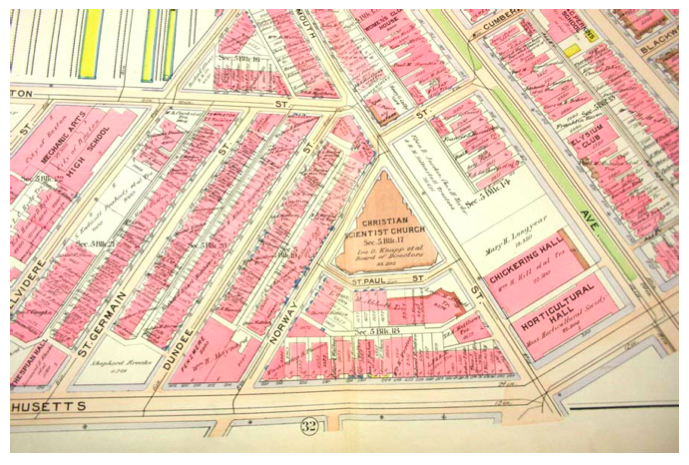
1908 map of Boston including Chickering Hall

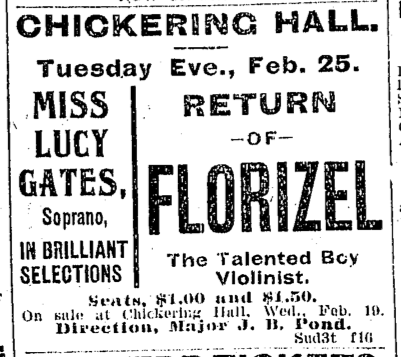
Ad in the Boston Globe, Feb. 16, 1902

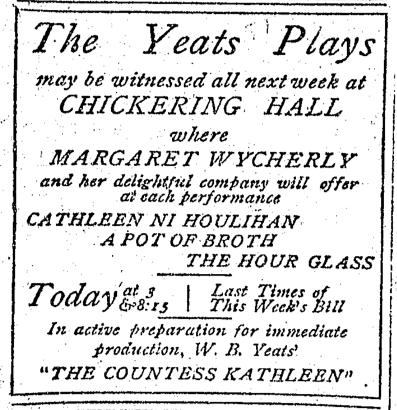
Advertisement, 1904

== See also ==
- Chickering Hall, Boston (1883)
- Chickering and Sons
