= Gustave Satter =

Austrian composer and pianist

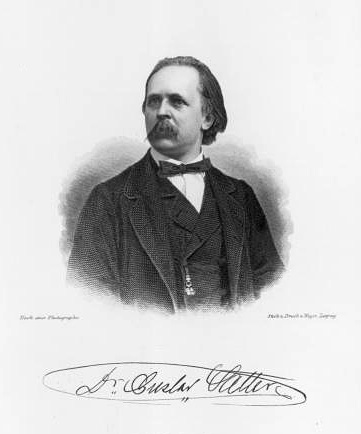

Gustave Satter (12 February 1832 – after 1882) was an Austrian composer and pianist.

== Biography ==
Gustave (or Gustav) Josephe Satter was born on 12 February 1832 in Vienna, Austria to Dr. John N. Satter and Caroline Weisshappel. (Satter claimed Napoleonic lineage, but there is no proof of this.) He did not follow in his father's footsteps to study medicine, and he pursued a career in music without much formal training. Satter first earned notice as a composer in Vienna, but this was quickly overshadowed by his solo piano recitals. After a series of successful concerts in New York City and Boston in 1855 he settled in the United States, where he taught, composed, and held concerts. He composed one opera, Olanthe. By 1861 he was back in Europe, but returned to the U.S. in 1875, touring across the country for years. His last appearances seem to have been in 1882, with concerts in New England and New Orleans. The same year, he married a young Belgian woman, Antoinette Victorine Gilman, in Northwood, NH, 3 October 1882.
