= Edouard Silas =

Dutch composer and organist

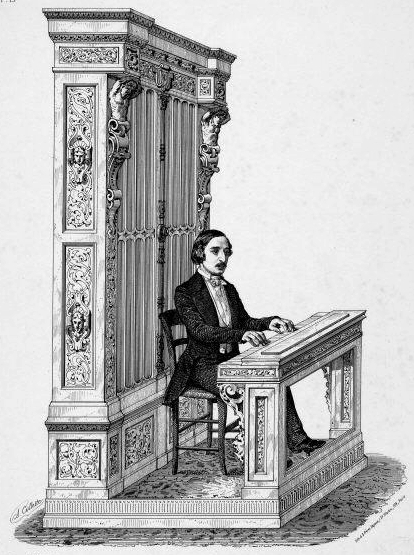
Edouard Silas

Edouard Silas (22 August 1827 – 8 February 1909) who was born in Amsterdam and died in London, was a Dutch composer and organist.

He studied music at Mannheim, in Frankfurt with Louis Lacombe, and then in Paris with Friedrich Kalkbrenner, François Benoist and Jacques Fromental Halévy. He lived in London from 1850. Silas was organist at the Catholic Chapel of Kingston upon Thames and Professor of Harmony at the Guildhall School of Music.

He was a composer of symphonies, piano concertos, string quartets and organ works. The Symphony in A, Op. 19 was first performed in 1863 and repeated the following year at the Crystal Palace. Other orchestral works include a Piano Concerto in D minor and two other works for piano and orchestra: Fantasia (performed at the Crystal Palace in 1865) and Elegie (performed 1873). He composed a Mass for four voices and organ for which he won a Belgian competition for sacred music in 1866. The oratorio Joash was given at the Norwich Festival in 1873. There are also many solo piano pieces, the best known of which include the Gavotte in E minor, Bourree in G minor, Malvina (a romance), the Suite in A minor Op.103, and Six Duets.

Silas was a teacher of harmony at the Guildhall School of Music and wrote an unpublished Treatise on Musical Notation. He was a noted chess player, and was known for his humour. In his Musical Times obituary, he was remembered as "a character" often seen in the British Museum Reading Room: "the little man with remarkable features and wearing a red fez". His address was 7 Comeragh Road, West Kensington, where he died in 1909, aged 81.
