= Chickering Hall (Boston, 1883) =

Concert auditorium in Boston, Massachusetts, US

- Interactive map of the Chickering Hall area

General information
- Location: Boston, Massachusetts, Tremont Street
- Coordinates: 42°21′16.26″N 71°3′49.28″W
- Completed: 1883 (143 years ago)

Chickering Hall (est.1883) was a concert auditorium in Boston, Massachusetts, in the late 19th century. It occupied the second floor of Chickering and Sons showrooms on Tremont Street, near the corner of West Street. "Bradlee, Winslow and Wetherell were the architects, and Mr. E.P. Treadwell, the decorator. The hall [was] lighted by the Edison electric light." By 1895: "Tremont St., towards Boylston, for some years has been called Piano Row, for a long row of piano agencies occupied a good portion of the block; but of late most of these have migrated to Boylston St. Chickering Hall, at 152 Tremont St., was for many years a favorite place for fashionable musicales, and the headquarters of the musical profession."

== Performances/Events ==
=== 1880s ===
- Matthew Arnold
- George Washington Cable
- Hubert von Herkomer
- Kneisel Quartet

=== 1890s ===
- Prof. Carpenter, hypnotist
- Vladimir de Pachmann
- James A. Herne's "Margaret Fleming"
- Thomas Nelson Page
- F. Hopkinson Smith
- Edward Alexander MacDowell
- George Grossmith, comedian

== Images ==
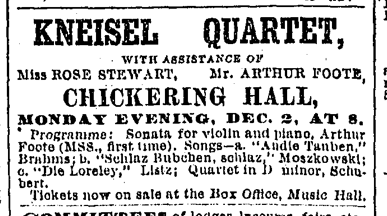
Advertisement, 1889

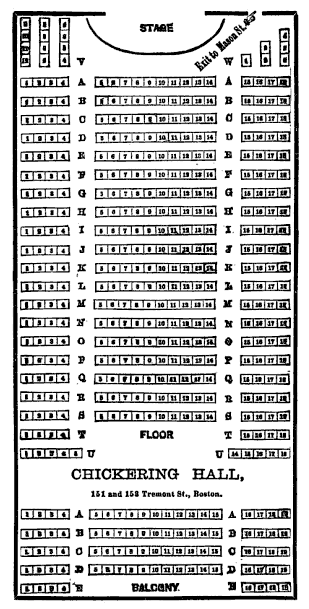
Seating chart, 1880s

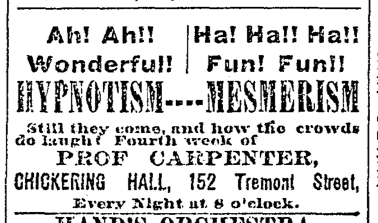
Advertisement, 1890

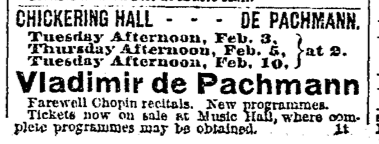
Advertisement, 1891

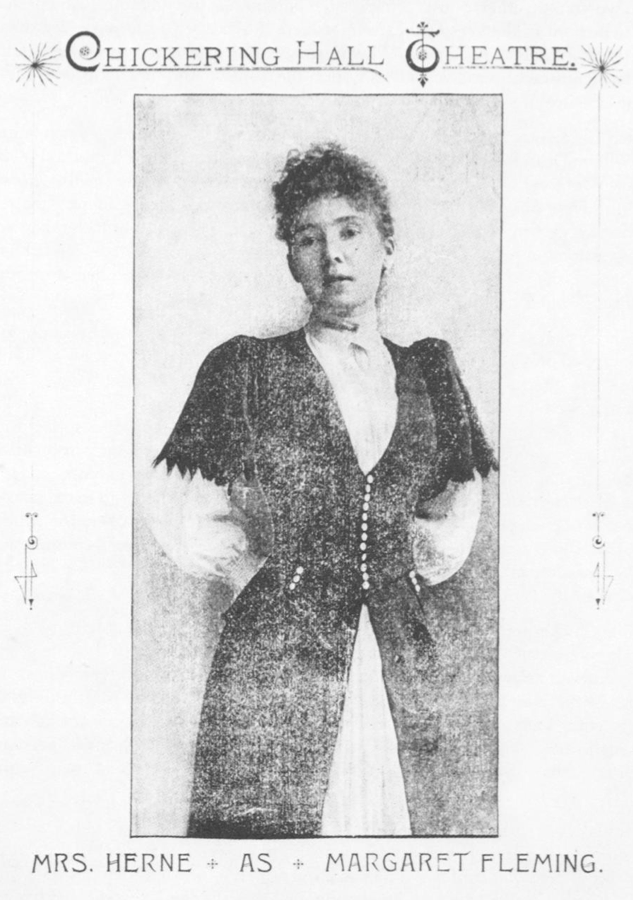
"Mrs. Herne as Margaret Fleming," 1891; depicts actress Katherine Corcoran

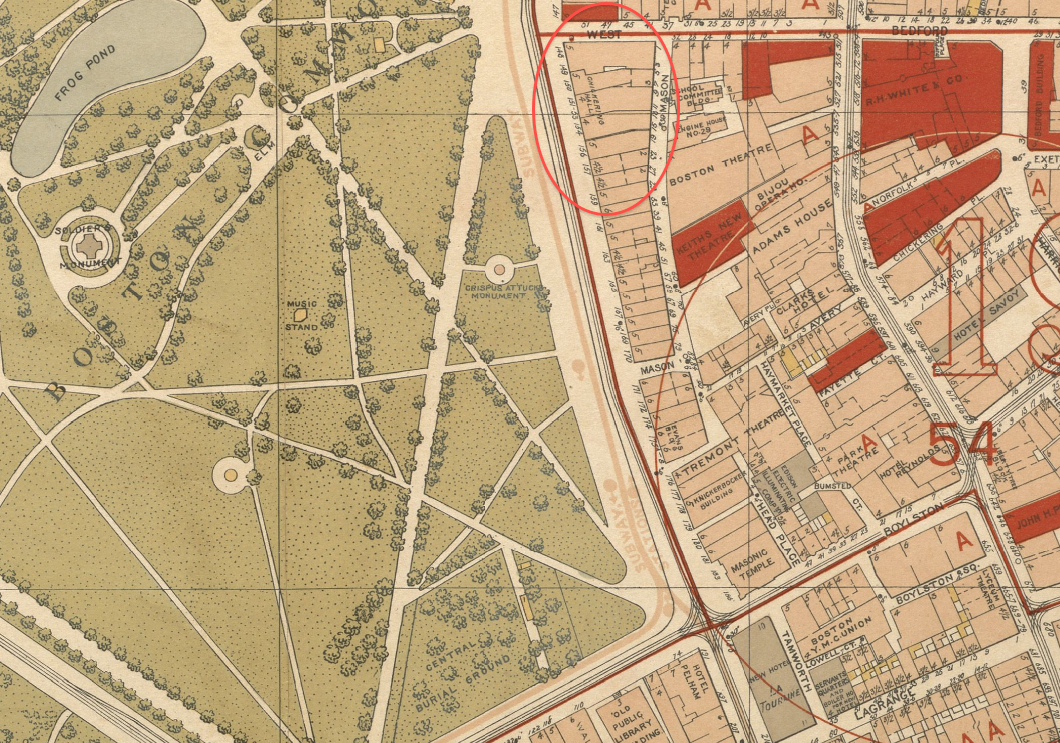
Detail of map of Boston in 1896, showing Chickering Hall opposite Boston Common

== See also ==
- Chickering and Sons
- Chickering Hall, Boston (1901), Huntington Avenue
