= Henry Sully =

English clockmaker

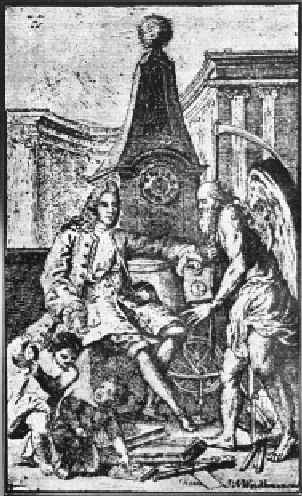
Henry Sully (1680-1729).

Henry Sully (1680–1729) was an English clockmaker. He was an apprentice and then journeyman for celebrated English clockmaker and watchmaker Charles Gretton. He lived in France for many years.

== Marine clock ==
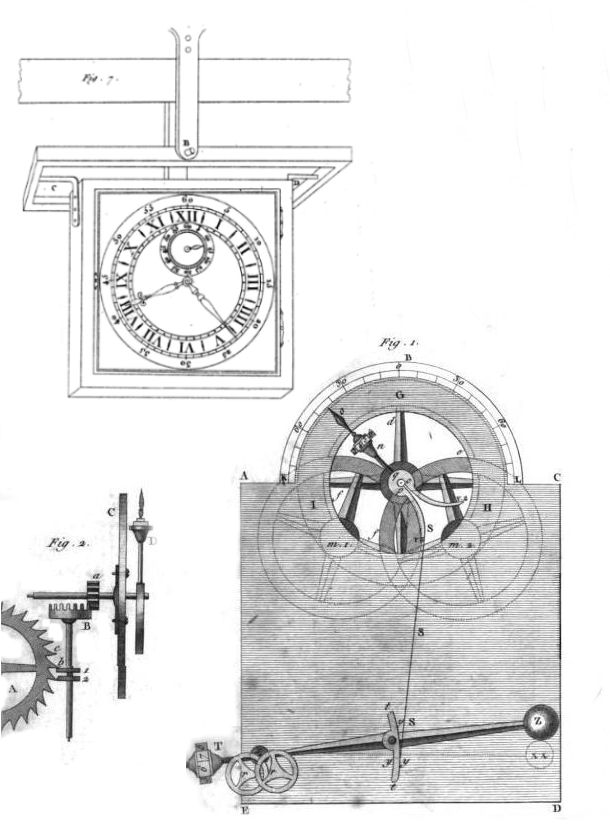
Henry Sully's clock (Fig.1) with escapement (Fig.2) and shipboard gimbaled suspension mechanism (Fig.7).

He invented a marine clock to determine longitude accurately, a sophisticated pendulum clock. He presented a first Montre de la Mer in 1716 to the French Académie des Sciences. He was the first person to develop a chronometer in Paris. In 1718, Henry Sully established a watch factory in Versailles. He presented two new models in 1723. In 1726, he published Une Horloge inventée et executée par M. Sulli. His chronometers performed well in calm weather, but not on the high seas.

Henry Sully worked with Julien Le Roy, a clockmaker to Louis XV. In France, Henry Sully was followed in his developments by Pierre Le Roy and Ferdinand Berthoud.

Soon after the 1726 publication of Une Horloge inventée et executée par M. Sulli, John Harrison started developing his own famous chronometer, creating a description and drawings for a proposed marine clock in 1730 and actually manufacturing the Harrison H1 in 1735.

== Gnomon of Saint-Sulpice ==
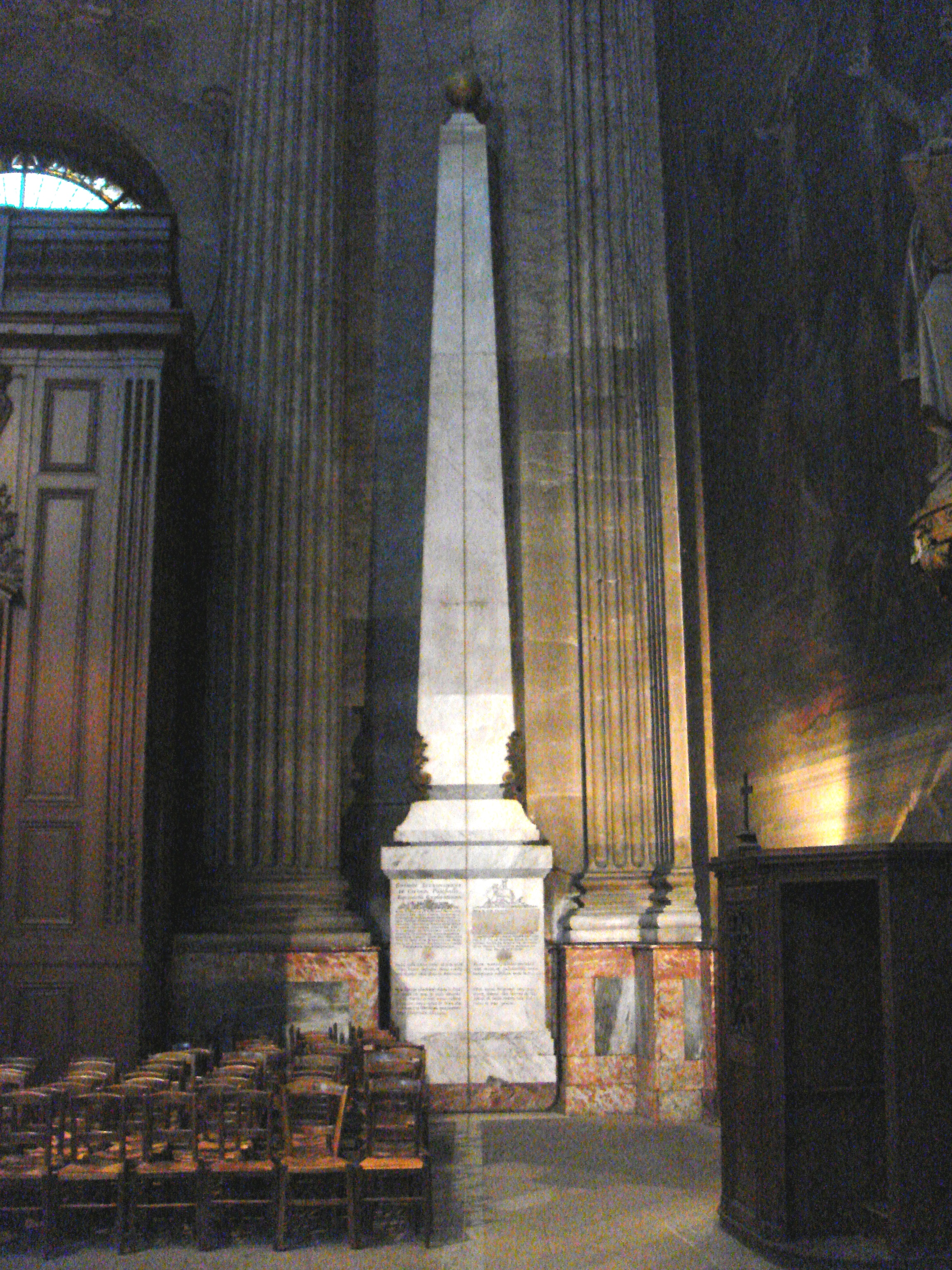
Henry Sully built the Gnomon of Saint-Sulpice.

The priest of Église Saint-Sulpice, Paris, Languet de Gergy, wishing to establish the exact astronomical time in order to ring the bells at the most appropriate time of day, commissioned Henry Sully to build the Gnomon of Saint-Sulpice.

In 1737, another one of his books was published: Illustrations de Règle artificielle du temps, traité de la division naturelle et artificielle du temps....

== Works ==
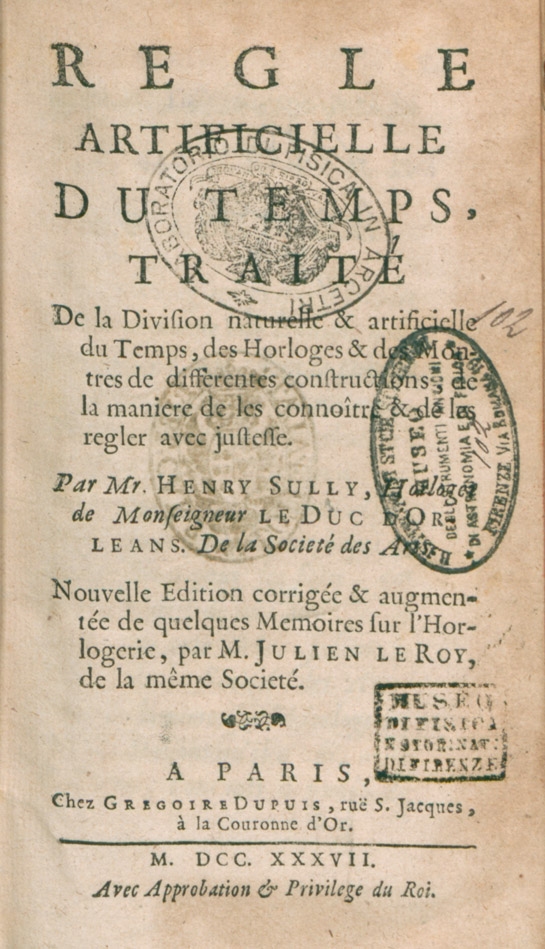
Regle artificielle du temps, 1737

- Regle artificielle du temps (in French). Grégoire Du Puis. 1737.
