= Gnomon of Saint-Sulpice =

Astronomical Measurement Device

Coordinates: 48°51′3.5″N 2°20′5.7″E

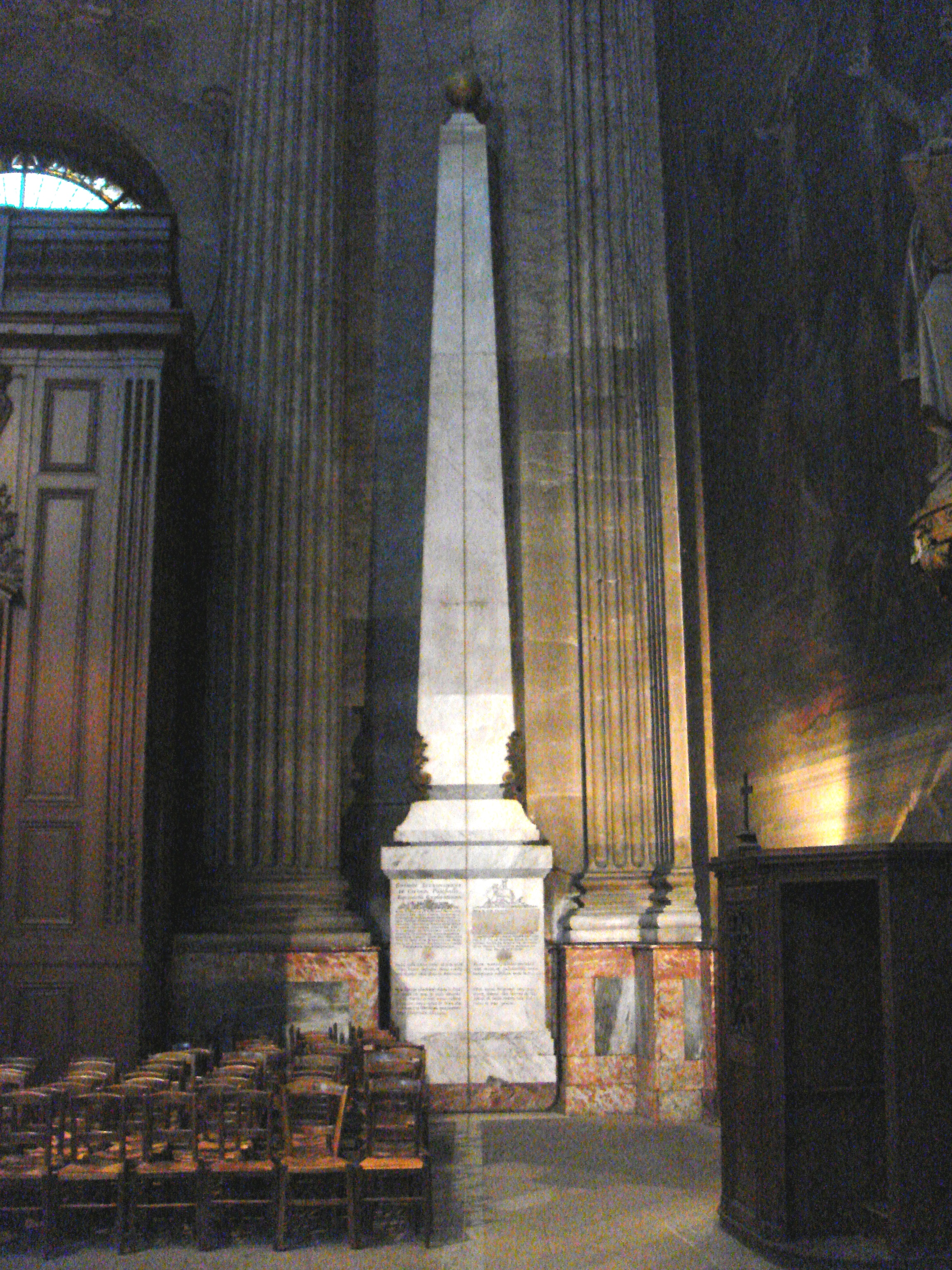
The obelisk portion of the gnomon of Saint-Sulpice Church, with the meridian line in the middle

The Gnomon of Saint-Sulpice is an astronomical measurement device located in the Church of Saint-Sulpice (Église Saint-Sulpice) in Paris, France. It is a gnomon, a device designed to cast a shadow on the ground in order to determine the position of the sun in the sky. In early modern times, other gnomons were also built in several Italian and French churches in order to better calculate astronomical events. Those churches are Santa Maria del Fiore in Florence, San Petronio in Bologna, and the Church of the Certosa in Rome. These gnomons ultimately fell into disuse with the advent of powerful telescopes.

== Structure ==
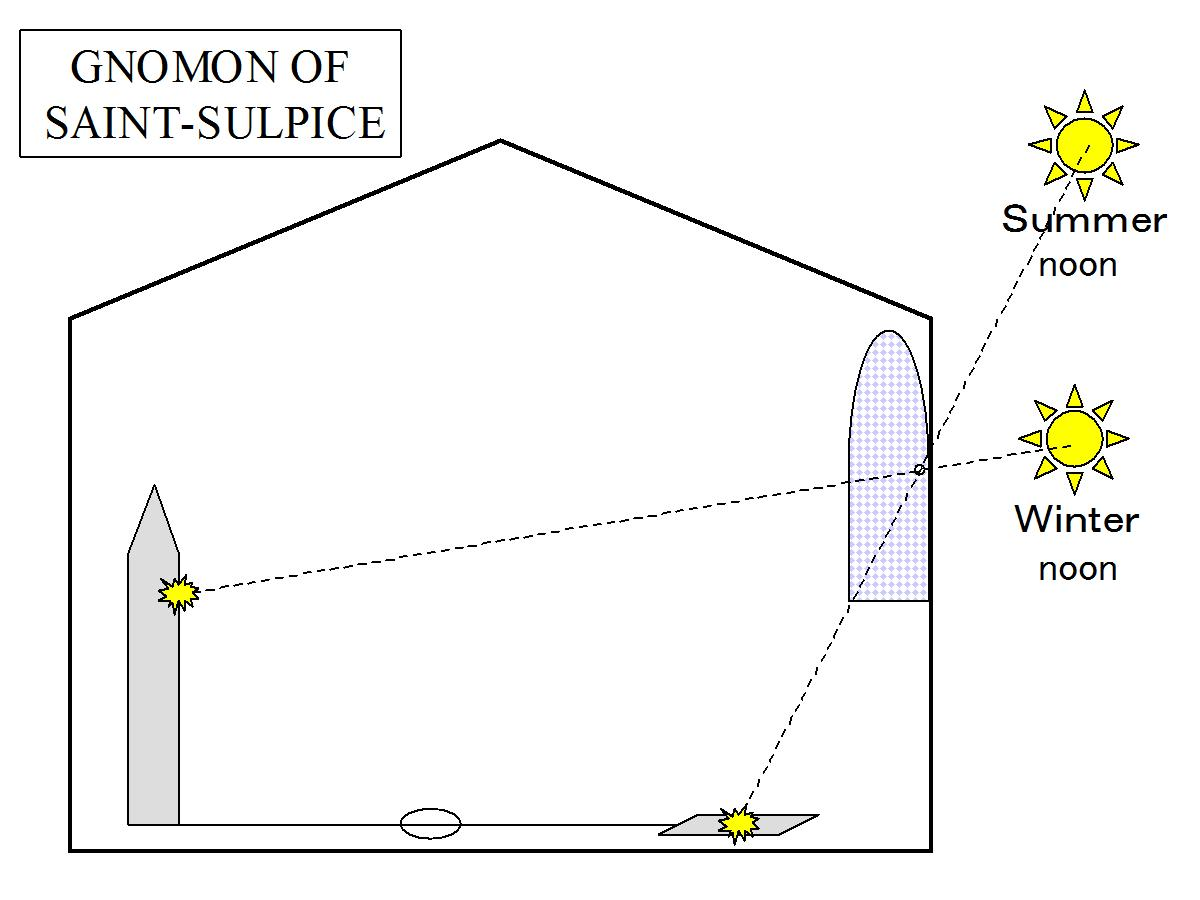
Gnomon structure at Saint-Sulpice

The gnomon of Saint-Sulpice is composed of different parts that span the breadth of the transept of the church. The church itself is a huge building, the largest church in Paris.

The system is first built around a meridian, a line which is strictly oriented along the north-south axis, represented by a brass line set in a strip of white marble on the floor of the church. This is not the Paris Meridian, established by Louis XIV in 1667, which is located a few hundred metres to the east and goes through the Paris Observatory.

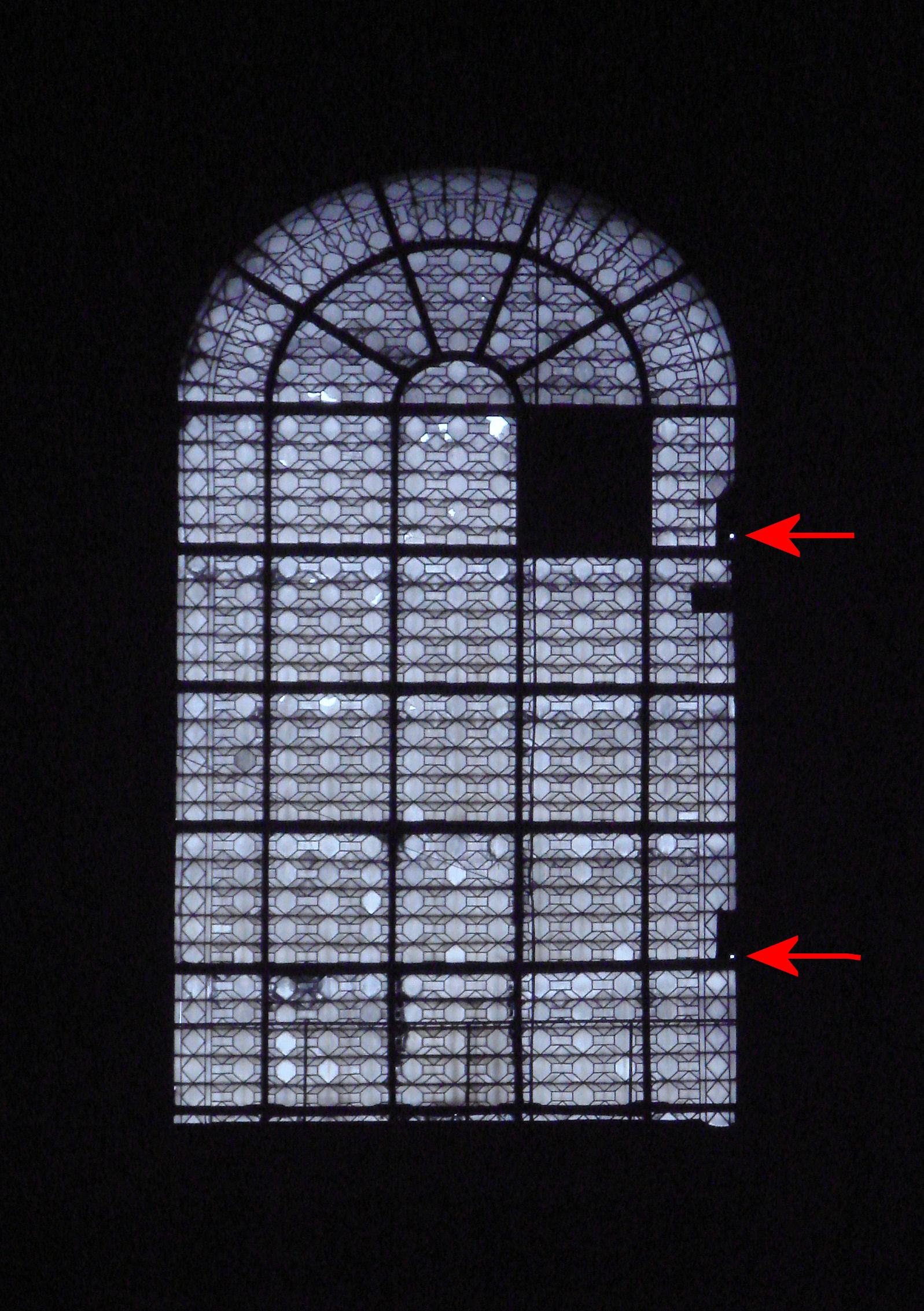
Gnomon hole in the stained glass window at Saint-Sulpice

The sunlight passes through a small round opening in the southern stained-glass window of the transept, at a height of 25 metres, forming a small light disc on the floor; this disc will cross the meridian each time the sun reaches its zenith at true noon. The sun will cross different parts of the meridian depending the time of year, as the sun will be more or less high in the sky at noon. A point on the meridian is marked with a gold disc which shows the position of the sun at an equinox. It is located right in front of the altar.

At one end of the meridian is a square marble plaque, which corresponds to the position of the sun at the highest at midday (64°35' at the location of Saint-Sulpice), during the summer solstice about 21 June.

At the other end is an obelisk, which is lit near its top when the sun is at it lowest at midday (17°42' at the location of Saint-Sulpice). If the obelisk did not exist, the sun disc would hit an area about 20 metres beyond the wall of the church.

== Usage of the gnomon ==
The gnomon was built at the initiative of Jean-Baptiste Languet de Gergy, the parish priest at Saint-Sulpice from 1714 to 1748. Languet de Gergy initially wished to establish the exact astronomical time in order to ring the bells at the most appropriate time of day. For this, he commissioned the English clockmaker Henry Sully to build the gnomon.

The equation of time — above the axis the sundial will appear fast when compared with a clock, and below it the sundial will appear slow.

The gnomon could also have been used to properly time clocks by properly defining mean time. Mean time (the time used in clocks) is only an average of true time (the time deduced from the apparent motions of the Sun in the sky, and shown, approximately, by a sundial). True time deviates from the mechanical average of a clock by as much as +/-16 minutes throughout the year. These variations are codified in the equation of time. Henry Sully, however, died in 1728 without being able to accomplish this larger project. He was only able to set the meridian line in the floor of the Church. The project was completed by the nearby Paris Observatory a year later.

=== Computation of official time ===
The time the sun disk crosses the Saint-Sulpice meridian gives the "true" local midday at that place. In order to compute the official French time from this, it is necessary to:

- add or subtract the deviation given by the equation of time.
- add half a second to have the mean Paris time.
- add 50 minutes 39 seconds to obtain Central European Time.
- add one hour in summer to take into account daylight saving time.

Alternatively, a simpler solution would be to consult an almanac giving the time of sunrise and sundown, calculate the middle point of that time-span, corresponding to the maximum elevation of the sun. This gives the official time at which the sun reaches it maximum elevation, and therefore the time the sun disk crosses the Saint-Sulpice meridian.

=== Computation of the Paschal equinox ===
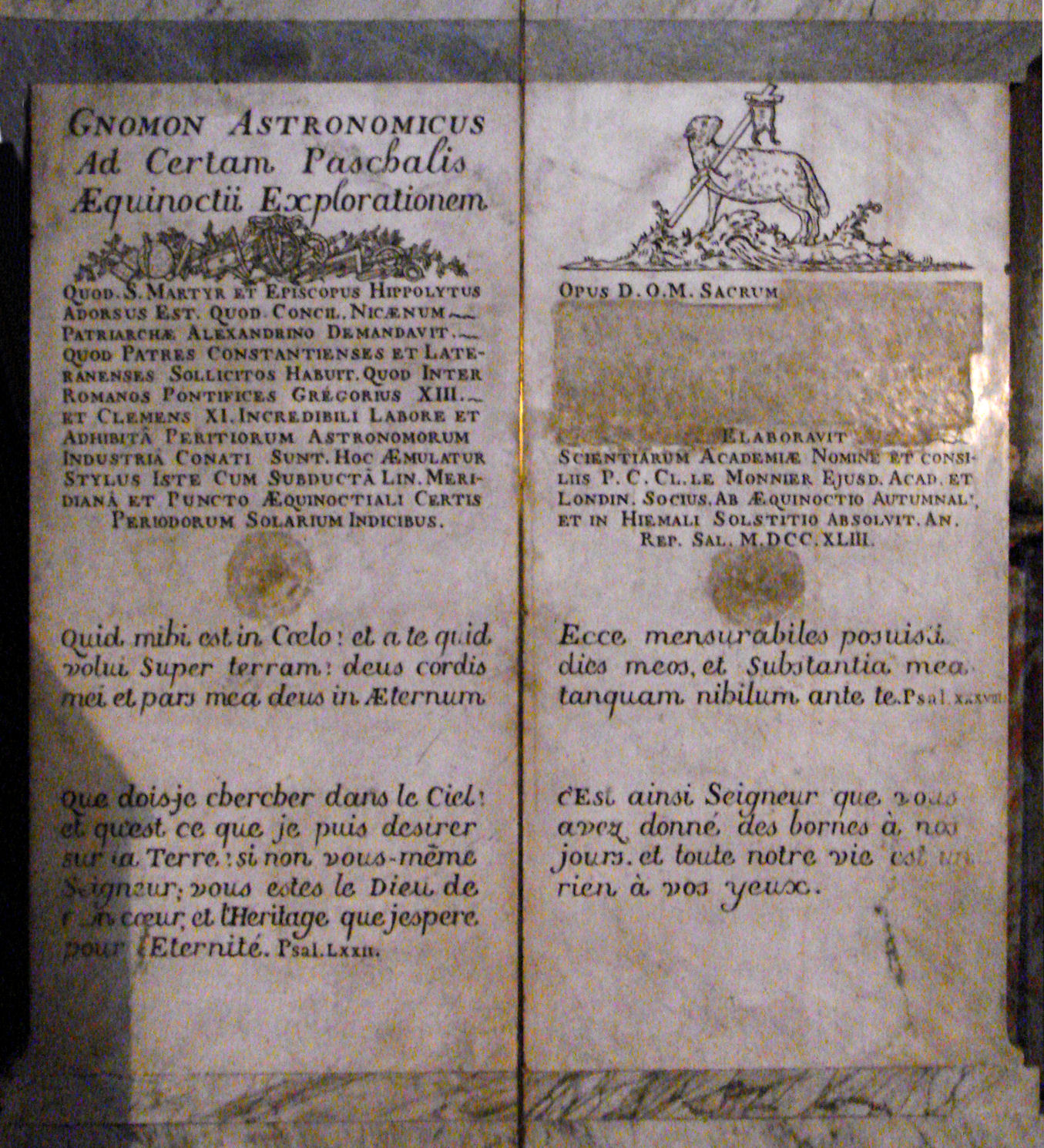
Latin and French inscriptions at the base of the obelisk. The mentions of the King and his Ministers were deleted. The name P.C.CL.LE MONNIER survives above right after the deletion.

After this first attempt, Languet de Gergy resumed the project in 1742, this time with the objective of properly defining the Easter Equinox. The task was given to Pierre Charles Le Monnier, member of the French Academy of Sciences.

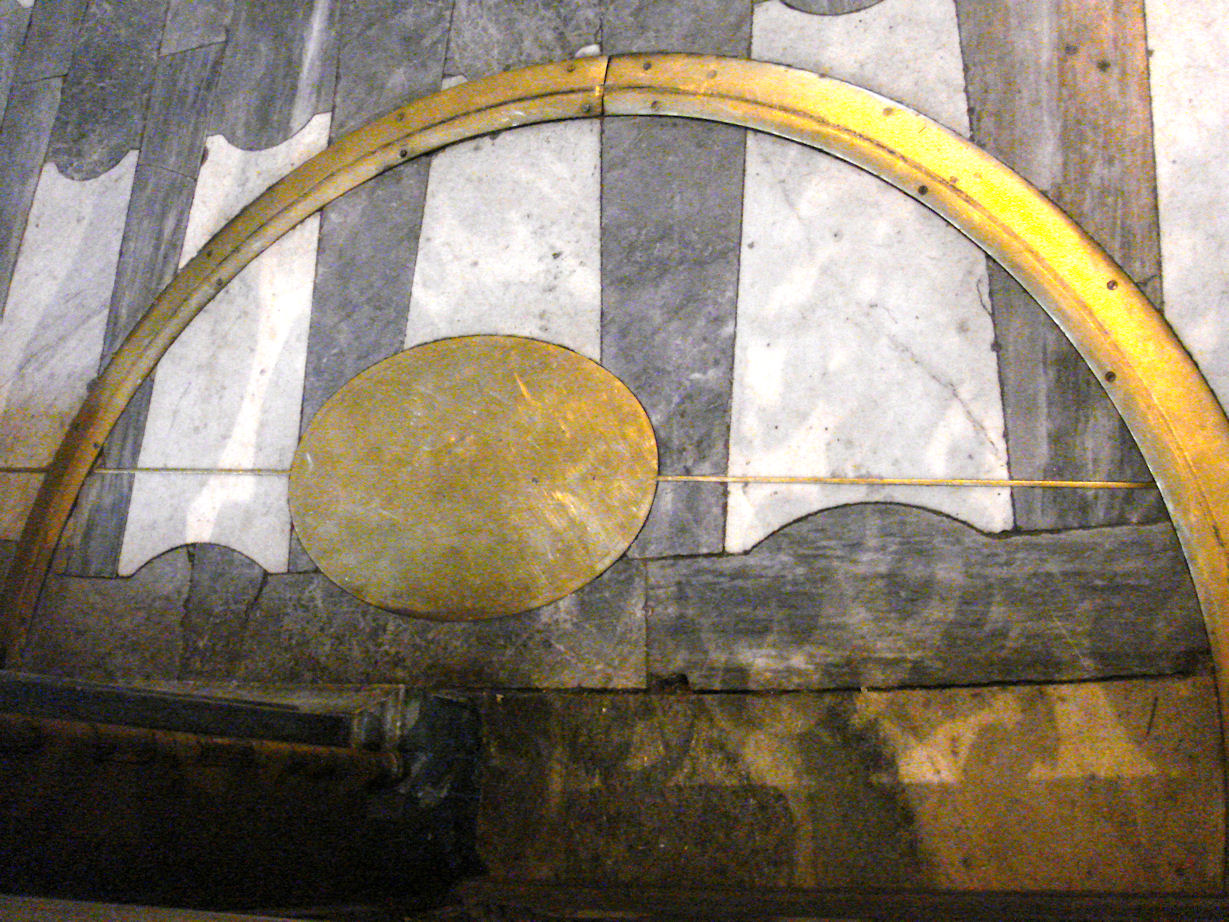
Central equinoctial marker

The inscription at the base of the obelisk mentions Charles Claude Le Monnier, as well as the mission of the gnomon in Latin: "Ad Certam Paschalis Æquinoctii Explorationem" ("To determine precisely the Paschal Equinox").

The dating of Easter was modeled on that of the Jewish Passover, which marks the liberation of the Jews from Egypt and which traditionally falls in the Jewish lunar calendar on the 14th of the month of Nisan, the day of the first full moon after the vernal (spring) equinox. Roman Christians, however, had a twelve-month calendar, first the Julian calendar until 1582, and then the Gregorian calendar. Since the Council of Nicaea in 325, the Western Church had required that Easter be celebrated on the Sunday on or after the full moon following March 21, which at that time corresponded indeed to the vernal equinox. The Julian calendar being imprecise however, by the 16th century March 21 fell about 10 days after the vernal equinox, a problem that was solved by the introduction of the Gregorian calendar. (The Eastern Christian Church continues to date Easter by the Julian calendar.) Languet de Gergy, however, wished to verify independently the exact date of the vernal equinox through the gnomon in order to ascertain the date of Easter.

=== Obliquity of the ecliptic ===
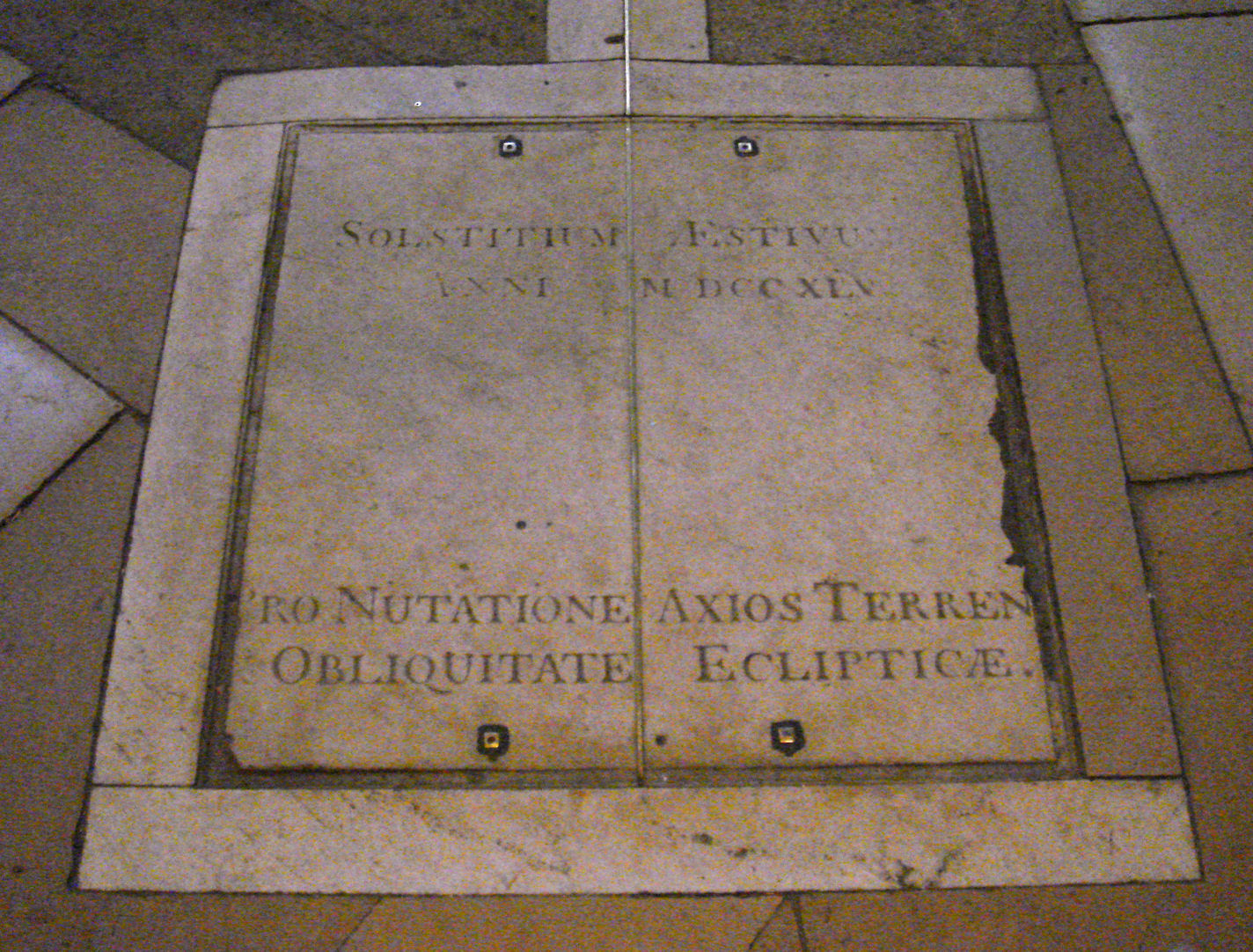
The plaque at the southern end of the meridian, mentioning the work on the obliquity of the ecliptic

Le Monnier further used the gnomon from 1744 to establish the variations of the ecliptic, or the variations in the obliquity of the Earth's axis. The endeavour is recorded on the plaque at the southern end of the meridian, in the South transept: "Pro nutatione axios terren. obliquitate eclipticae" ("for the nutation of the earth's axis and the obliquity of the ecliptic").

As mentioned on a brass plaque that covered the stone plaque, the obliquity of the ecliptic was 23°28'40".69 in 1744. From 1745 to 1791, Le Monnier visited Saint-Sulpice at each summer solstice and, focusing the light with a lens fixed to the opening in the stained-glass window so as to produce a sharp image of the sun on the floor, noted the exact position of the image at noon. From these observations, he calculated a variation of the obliquity of 45" per century (the exact figure is 46".85 per century).

=== Perihelion ===
The gnomon also permitted the determination of the date of the earth's perihelion (the moment the earth is closest to the sun in its elliptical trajectory around the sun), by measuring the size of the image of the sun cast on the obelisk and finding the time when it was largest. Perihelion occurs close to the winter solstice, during the period of the year when the sun's image at noon is on the obelisk, rather than on the floor of the church.

== Interpretations ==
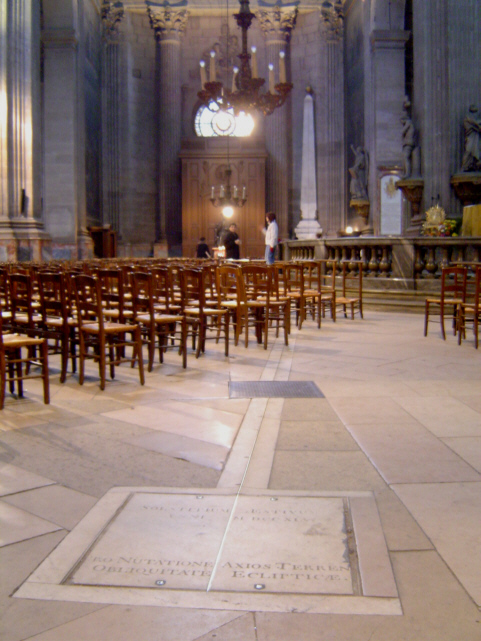
The obelisk (in the background), the meridian brass line on the floor, and the southern plaque

Some interpretations of the gnomon at Saint-Sulpice give it an occult meaning. The author Dan Brown in The Da Vinci Code describes it as "a pagan astronomical instrument (...) an ancient sundial of sorts, vestige of the pagan temple that had once stood on this very spot", despite an early modern building date of 1714, and the fact that it is an astronomical device with nothing especially pagan about it. Brown also qualifies the obelisk as "Egyptian" despite its recent date of manufacture in 1743: "a most unexpected structure, a colossal Egyptian obelisk". He also equates the Saint-Sulpice meridian with the Paris Meridian, although they are different, being several hundred meters apart: "Long before the establishment of Greenwich as the prime meridian, the zero longitude had passed through Paris and through the Church of Saint-Sulpice".

The building of the gnomon inside the Church of Saint-Sulpice occurred at a time when Rome was relaxing its stance against the theories of Galileo Galilei, as his works were being printed in Rome with the agreement of the Holy See, and in 1757 the Pope removed the works of Galileo from the Index Librorum Prohibitorum.

== Santa Maria degli Angeli e dei Martiri ==
A similar gnomon built to calculate the exact date of Easter also exists in the Santa Maria degli Angeli e dei Martiri in Rome. Commissioned by Pope Clement XI, it was designed by Francesco Bianchini and completed in 1702.

== See also ==
- Astronomical clock
