= Jean-Baptiste Languet de Gergy =

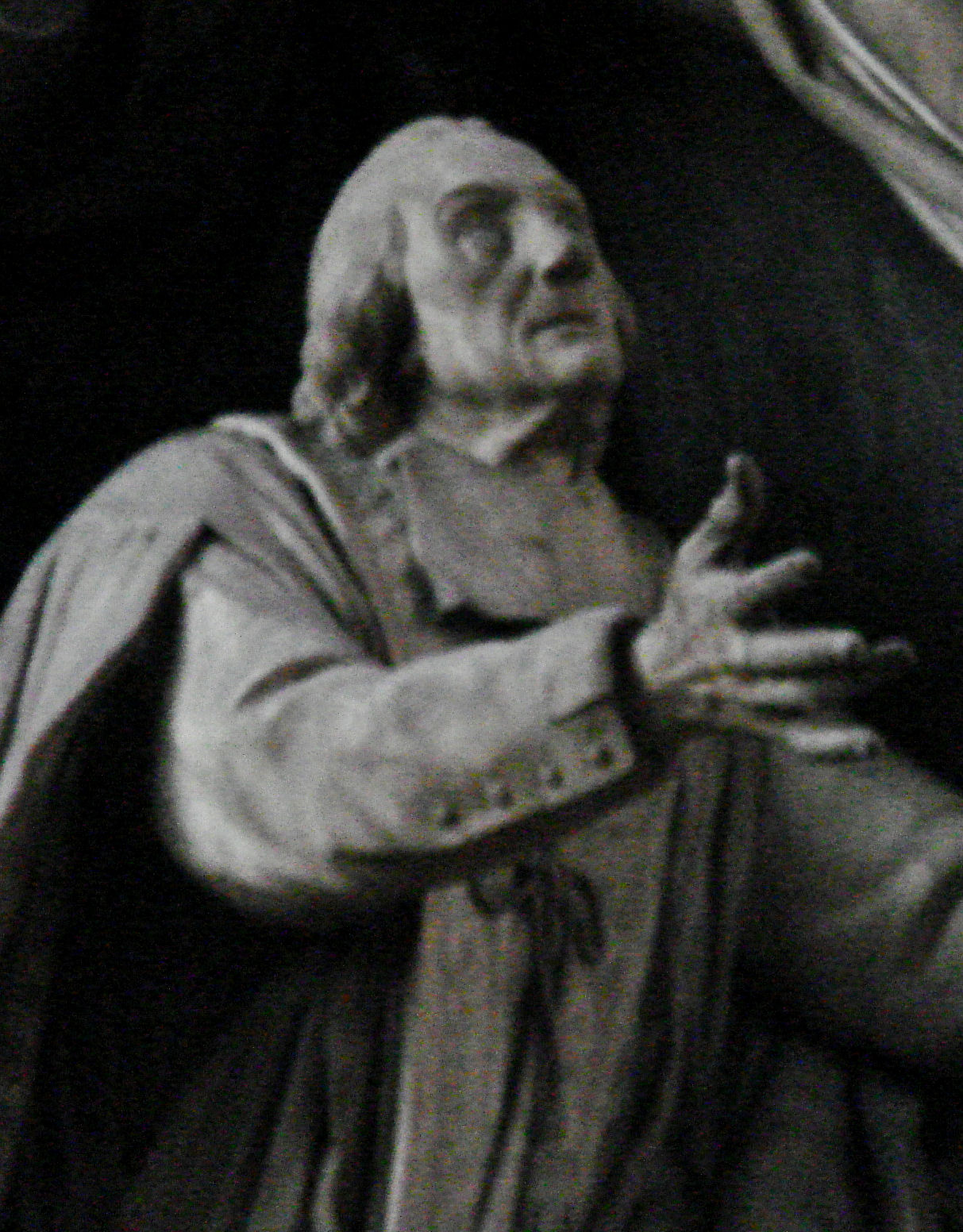
Funerary monument of Jean-Baptiste Languet de Gergy in Eglise Saint-Sulpice.

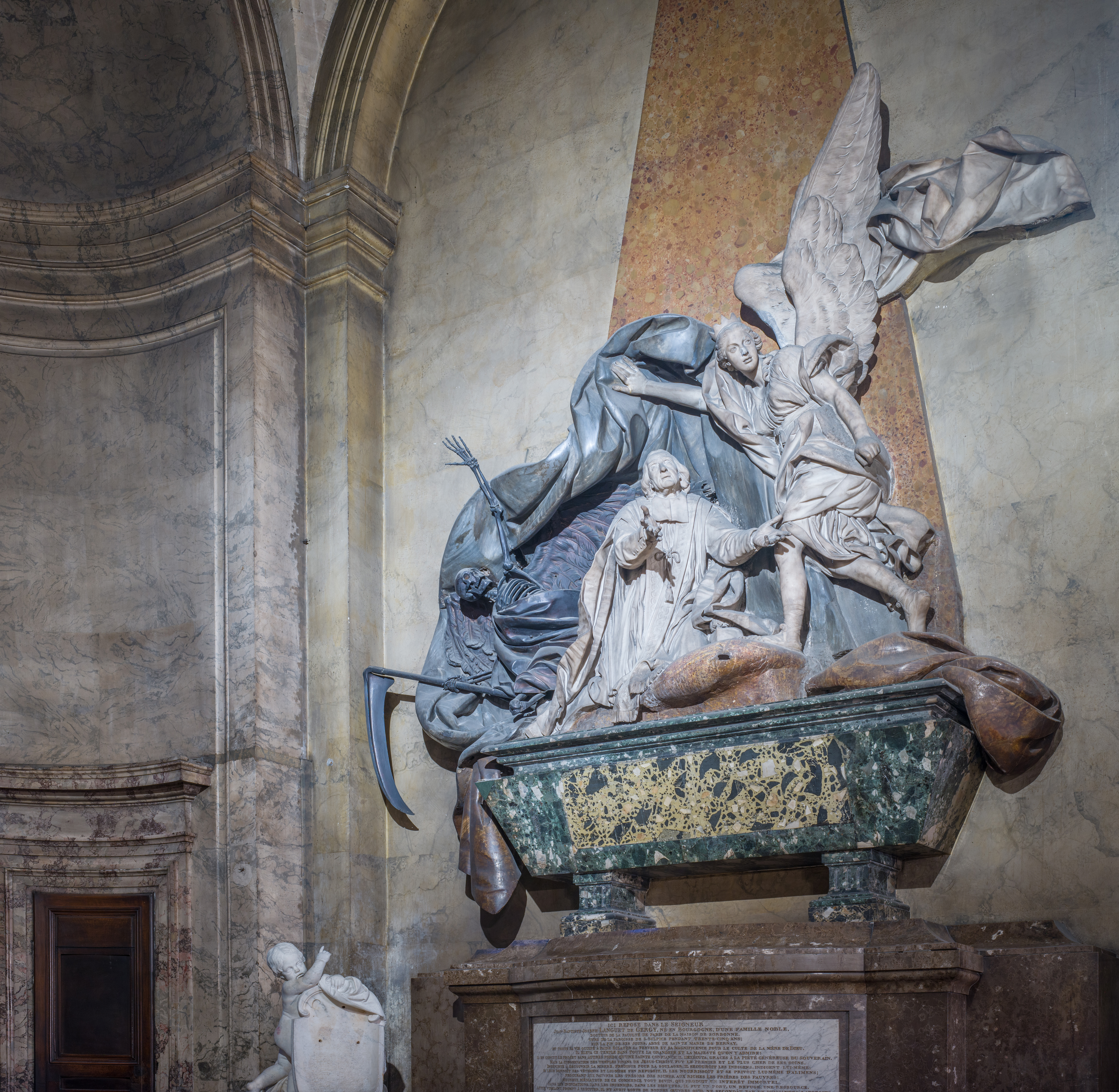
The monument to Jean-Baptiste Languet de Gergy.

Jean-Baptiste Languet de Gergy (1674–1750) was parish priest at Eglise Saint-Sulpice in Paris from 1714 to 1748. He was the initiator of the construction of the Gnomon of Saint-Sulpice.

== Biography ==
Languet de Gergy initially wished to establish the exact astrological time in order to ring the bells at the most appropriate time of day. For this, he commissioned the English clockmaker Henry Sully to build the gnomon. A staunch moralist, Languet is famous for denying the sacraments to Marie Louise Élisabeth d'Orléans, Duchess of Berry, eldest daughter of Philippe II, Duke of Orléans. At the end of March 1719, the young widow became critically "ill", shut up in a little chamber of her Luxembourg Palace. In fact, she was deep in the pangs of childbirth and as she seemed close to dying, Languet was called upon to administer her the sacraments. He refused unless the royal princess would part with her lover, the count of Riom, captain of her guard. The Regent tried to intervene on behalf of his suffering daughter but the inflexible curé did not yield. At last, the Duchess was delivered, ending the crisis but not the scandal provoked by Languet's refusal to turn a blind eye to her clandestine childbearing.
