= Pierre Le Roy =

18th-century French clockmaker

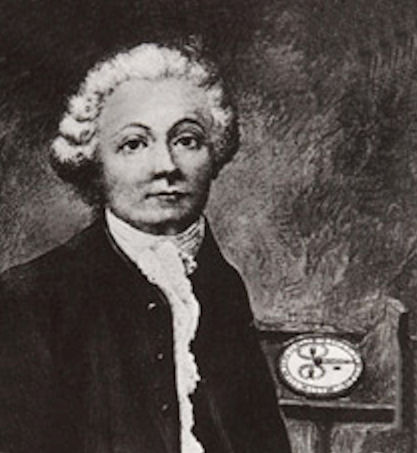
- Born: 1717
- Died: 26 August 1785 (aged 67–68)
- Occupation: Watchmaker

Pierre Le Roy (French pronunciation: [pjɛʁ lə ʁwa]; 1717–1785) was a French clockmaker. He was the inventor of the detent escapement, the temperature-compensated balance and the isochronous balance spring. His developments are considered as the foundation of the modern precision clock. Le Roy was born in Paris, eldest son of Julien Le Roy, a clockmaker to Louis XV who had worked with Henry Sully, in which place Pierre Le Roy succeeded his father. He had three brothers: Jean-Baptiste Le Roy (1720-1800), a physicist; Julien-David Le Roy (1724–1803), an architect; and Charles Le Roy (1726–1779), a physician and encyclopédiste.

== Invention of the detent escapement ==
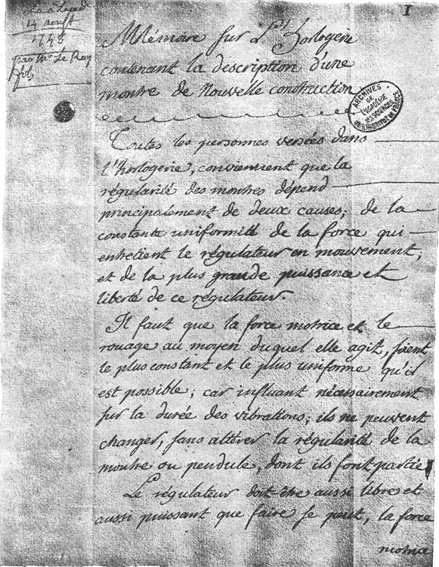
Description of the Le Roy detent escapement mechanism by the Académie des Sciences, 14 August 1748.

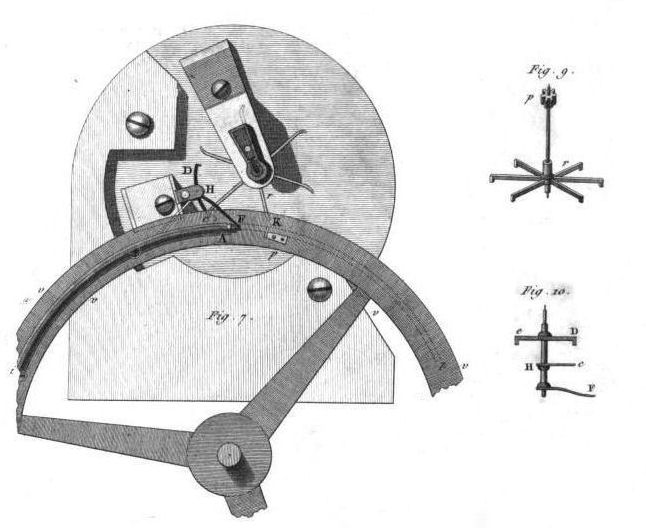
Le Roy detent escapement mechanism.

In 1748, he invented a pivoted detent type of escapement, or detached escapement, which makes him the inventor of the detent escapement: "The invention of the detached escapement belongs to P. Le Roy". This should not be confused with the detached ‘lever’ escapement which was invented by Thomas Mudge circa 1755.

He was distinguished principally in his mastery and improvement of the clock and chronograph, above all of the marine chronometer, in which he carried forward the pioneering work of John Harrison. He took a different approach from that of Harrison, believing that the way to achieve seaworthiness was to detach the escapement from the balance. He also differed from Harrison regarding his temperature compensation method, which used the variation of the rotation radius of the balance by modifying the diameter of the balance through bi-metallic components, a method which would become a standard in chronometers. His technique for temperature compensation was highly efficient in that it worked without changing the length of the spiral balance spring, which he had discovered to be isochronous only at a precise given length (i.e. when frequency is independent of amplitude, so that a mechanical clock or watch runs at the same rate regardless of changes in its drive force, so it keeps correct time as the mainspring unwinds).

== Development of the modern marine chronometer ==
After having designed plans in 1754, he constructed his first chronometers by 1756, and accomplished his masterpiece in 1766. This remarkable chronometer incorporated a detached escapement, a temperature-compensated balance and an isochronous balance spring, innovations which would be adopted in subsequent chronometers. Harrison demonstrated a reliable chronometer at sea, but these developments by Le Roy are considered by Rupert Gould to be the foundation of the modern chronometer. Pierre Le Roy's chronometer had a performance equivalent to that of the Harrison H4 chronometer.

In 1769, after his chronometre underwent testing aboard the corvette Aurore, he was awarded the double prize offered by the Académie française for the best method of measuring time at sea. He succeeded in giving his instruments the greatest possible regularity by the discovery of the isochronous spiral spring, in which he was in competition with Ferdinand Berthoud, but which he published first.

Le Roy's prototype marine chronometre
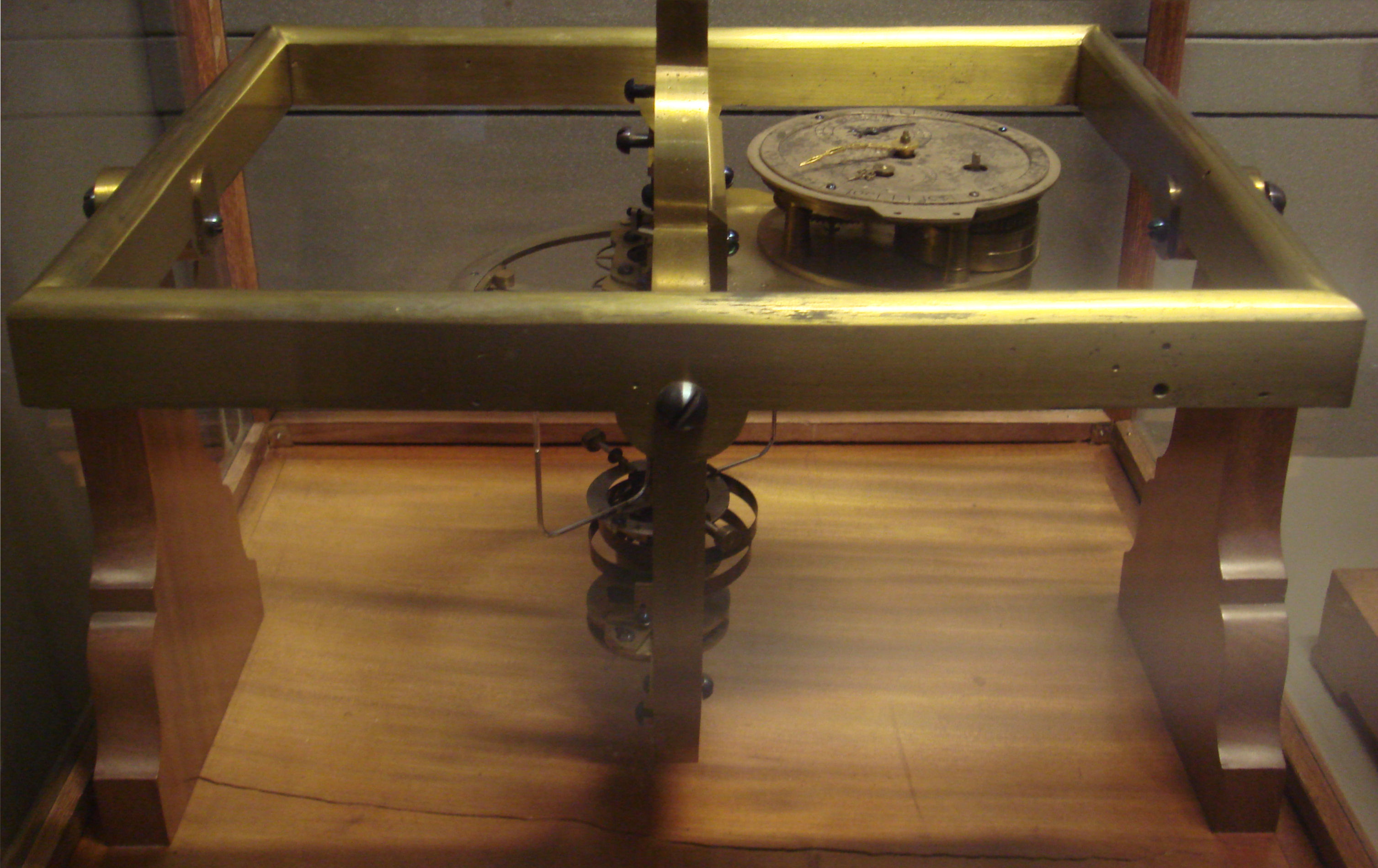
Pierre Le Roy chronometer, 1766, Musée des Arts et Métiers

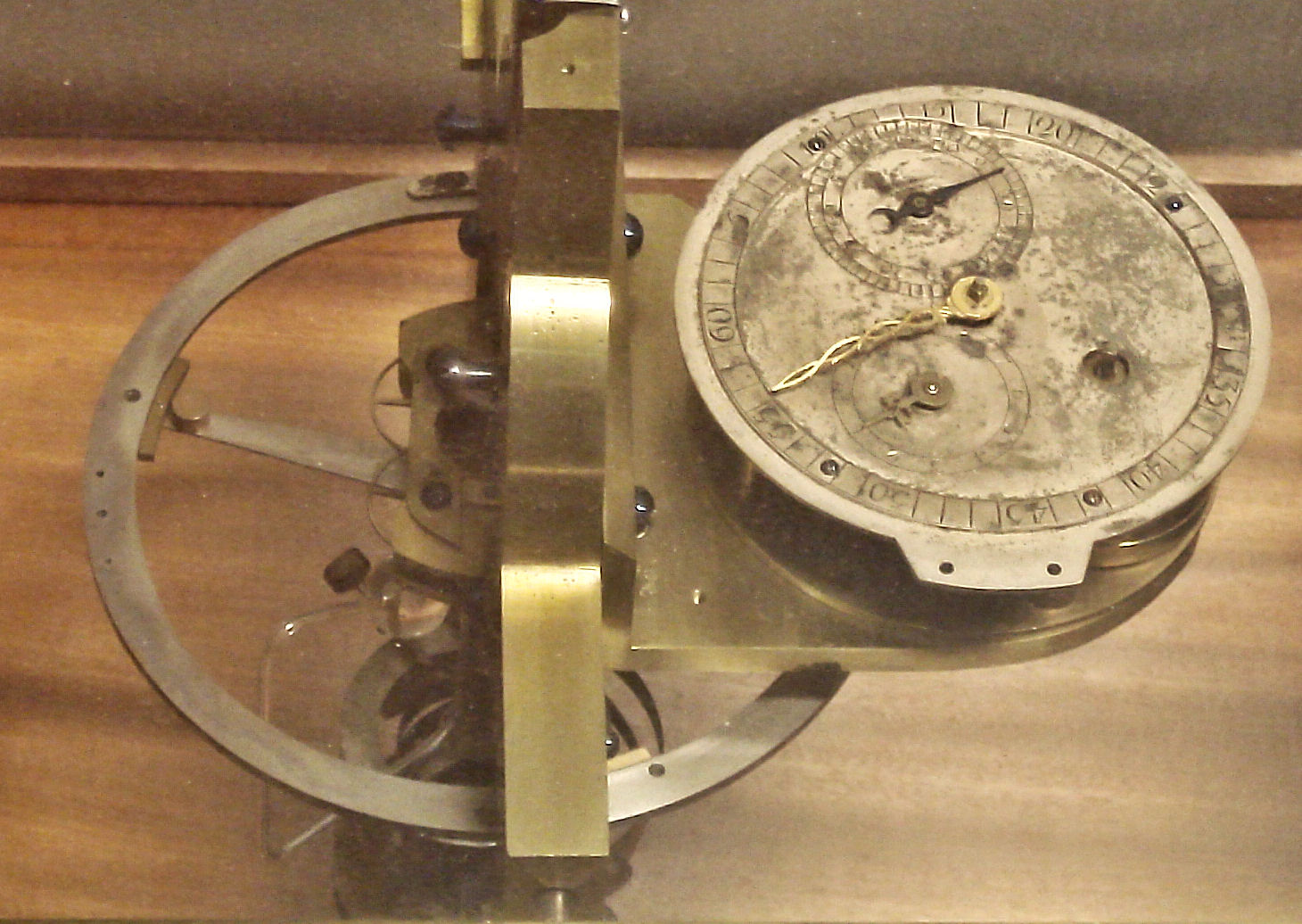
Pierre Le Roy chronometer, 1766

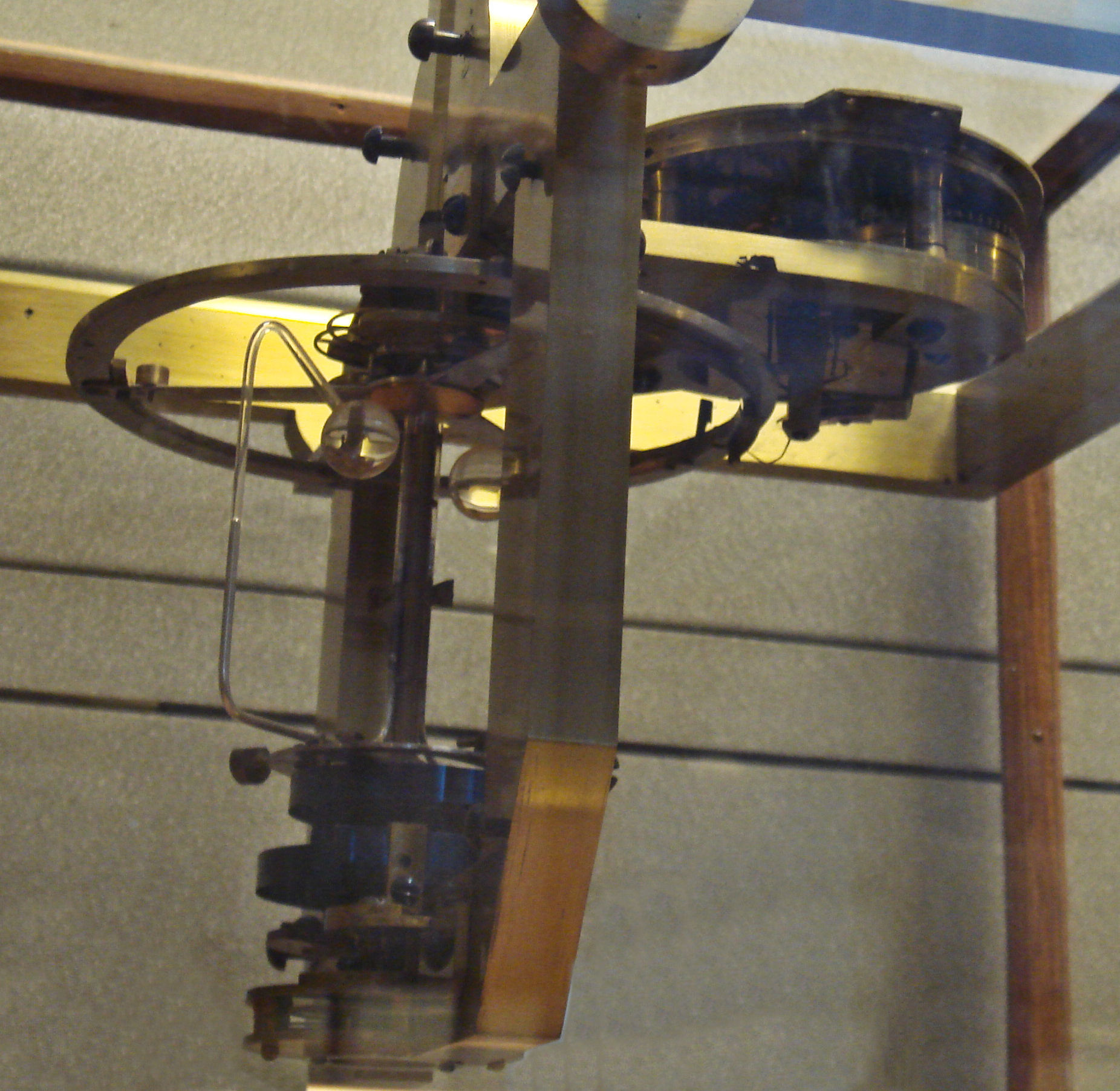
Pierre Le Roy chronometer mechanism

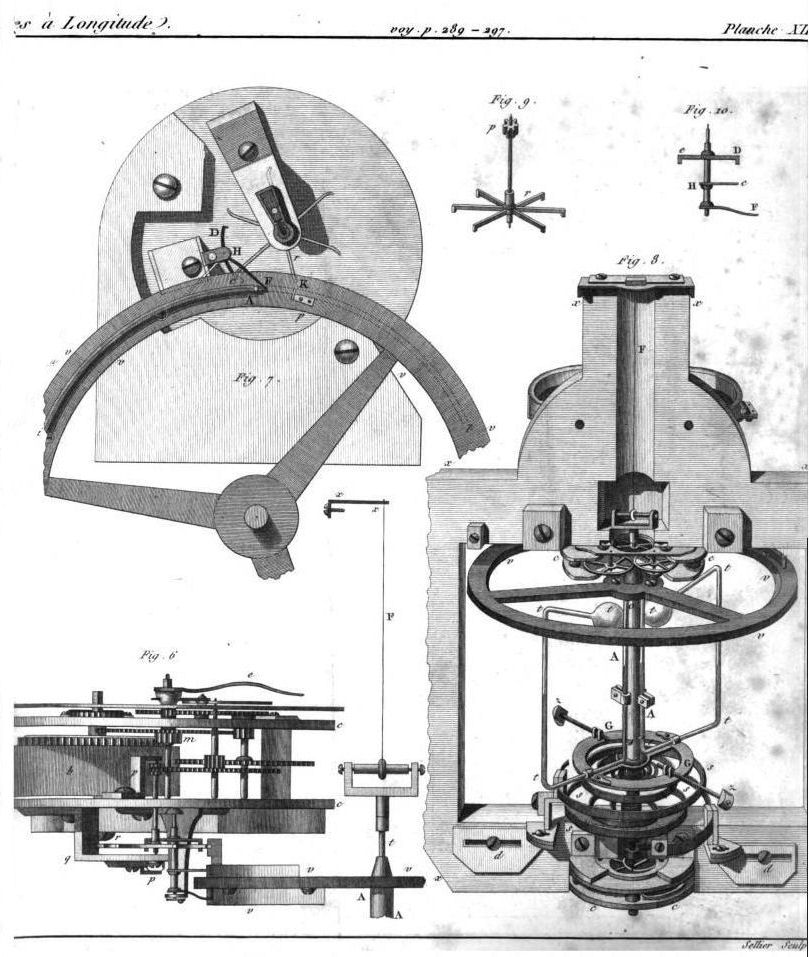
Plans of Le Roy chronometer

He was the author of several valuable publications on the art and science of clock-making and chronography, among them the Étrennes chronométriques of 1760. He also became Horloger du Roi in 1760.

The work of Le Roy was not fully recognized in France however, and his contemporary Ferdinand Berthoud became more famous, obtaining the prestigious title of Horloger de Marine, which left Le Roy disillusioned and led him to retire. He died in Vitry in 1785.

== Sources and external links ==
- hautehorlogerie.org: Longitude at Sea
- hautehorlogerie.org: Pierre Le Roy

== Bibliography ==
- Dorange, Auguste Jean, 1880: Notice sur Julien Le Roy, horloger (p. 3). Tours: Rouillé-Ladevèze
