= Pierre Charles Le Monnier =

French astronomer (1715–1799)

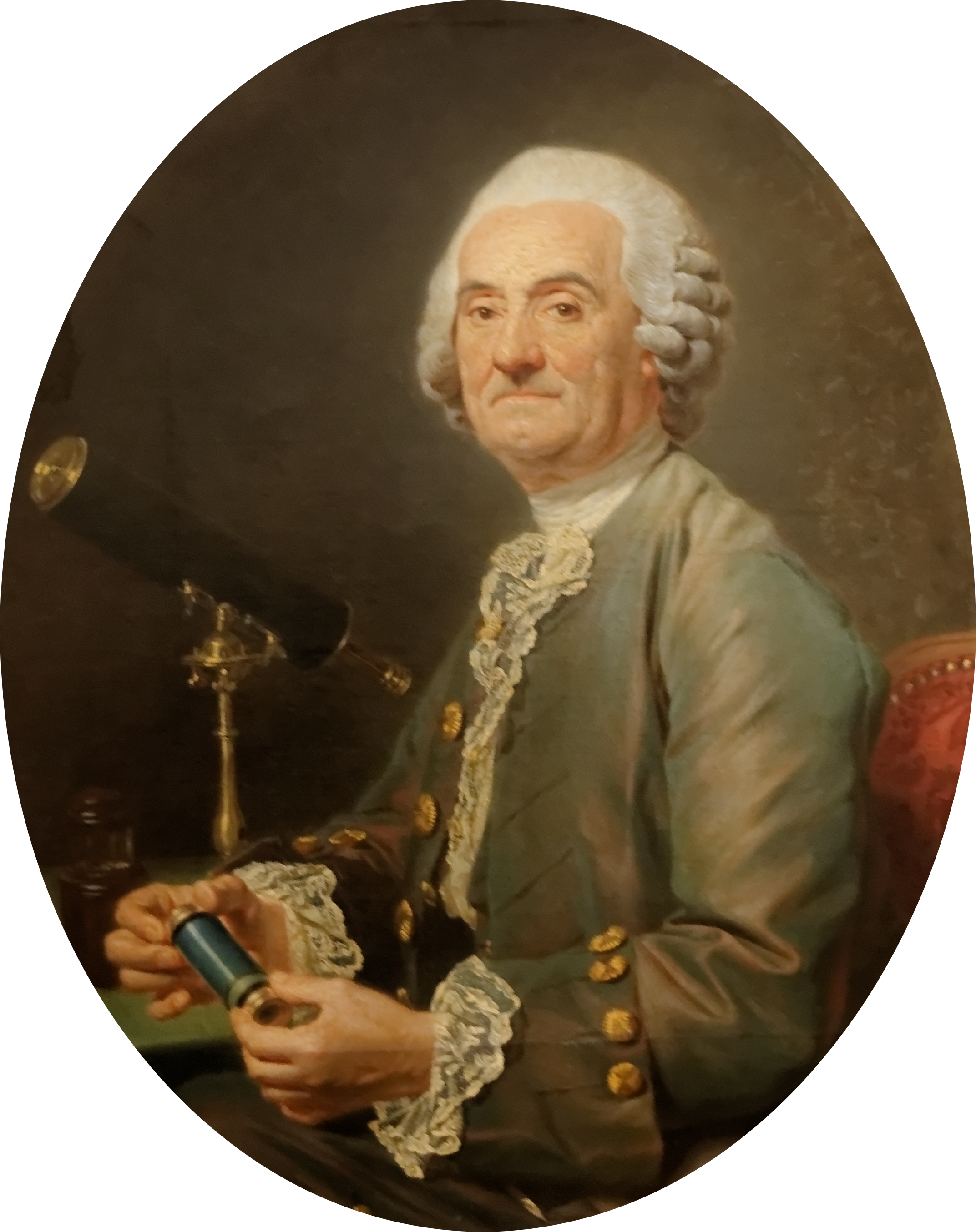
- Portrait of Pierre Charles Le Monnier. "L'astronome" (The Astronomer), circa 1777. Oil on canvas painting by Nicolas-Bernard Lépicié at the Calouste Gulbenkian Museum.
- Born: November 20, 1715; Paris, France
- Died: May 31, 1799 (aged 83); Héril, Bayeux, France
- Education: French Academy of Sciences
- Scientific career
- Fields: astronomy, physics
- Workplaces: Collège de France

Pierre Charles Le Monnier (French: [pjɛʁ ʃaʁl lə mɔnje]; 20 November 1715 – 31 May 1799) was a French astronomer. His name is sometimes given as Lemonnier.

== Biography ==
Le Monnier was born in Paris, where his father Pierre (1675–1757), also an astronomer, was professor of philosophy at the college d'Harcourt.

His first recorded astronomical observation was made before he was sixteen, and the presentation of an elaborate lunar map resulted in his admission to the French Academy of Sciences, on 21 April 1736, aged only 20. He was chosen in the same year to accompany Pierre Louis Maupertuis and Alexis Clairaut on their geodetical expedition for measuring a meridian arc of approximately one degree's length to Torne Valley in Lapland. In 1738, shortly after his return, he explained, in a memoir read before the academy, the advantages of John Flamsteed's mode of determining right ascensions.

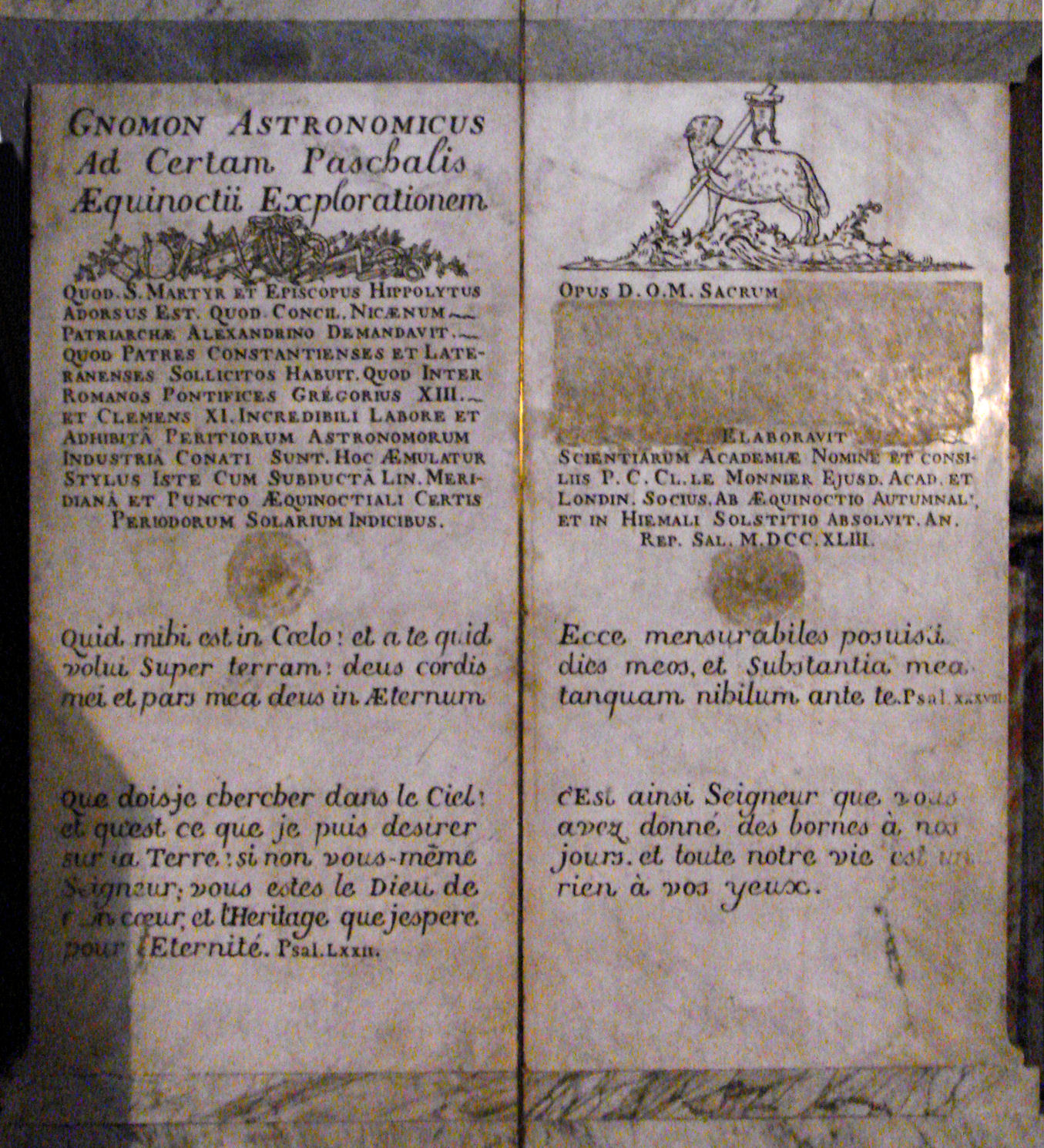
Latin and French inscriptions at the base of the obelisk of the Gnomon of Saint-Sulpice in Paris, mentioning Pierre Charles Claude Le Monnier above right

His persistent recommendation of British methods and instruments contributed effectively to the reform of French practical astronomy, and constituted the most eminent of his services to science. He corresponded with James Bradley, was the first to represent the effects of nutation in the solar tables, and introduced, in 1741, the use of the transit-instrument at the Paris Observatory. He visited England in 1748, and, in company with the Earl of Morton and James Shore the optician, continued his journey to Scotland, where he observed the annular eclipse of 25 July.

The liberality of King Louis XV of France, in whose favour Le Monnier stood high, furnished him with the means of procuring the best instruments, many made in Britain. Amongst the fruits of his industry may be mentioned a laborious investigation of the disturbances of Jupiter by Saturn, the results of which were employed and confirmed by Euler in his prize essay of 1748; a series of lunar observations extending over fifty years; some interesting researches in terrestrial magnetism and atmospheric electricity, in the latter of which he detected a regular diurnal period; and the determination of the places of a great number of stars, including at least twelve separate observations of Uranus, between 1750 and its recognition as a planet. In his lectures at the Collège de France he first publicly expounded the analytical theory of gravitation, and his timely patronage secured the services of Jérôme Lalande for astronomy.

Le Monnier's temper and hasty speech resulted in many arguments and grudges. He fell out with Lalande "during an entire revolution of the moon's nodes". His career was ended by paralysis late in 1791, and a repetition of the stroke terminated his life. He died at Héril near Bayeux. By his marriage with Mademoiselle de Cussy he left three daughters, one of whom became the wife of Joseph-Louis Lagrange.

Le Monnier was admitted on 5 April 1739 to the Royal Society, and was one of the 144 original members of the institute. On 29 January 1745 he also became a member of the Prussian Academy of Sciences.

The crater Le Monnier on the Moon is named after him.

== Works ==
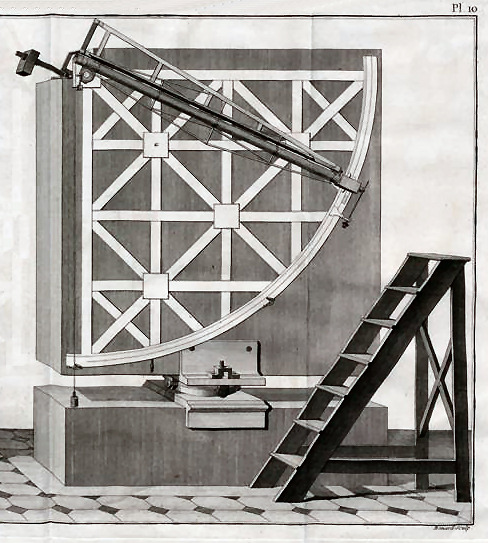
Astronomical quarter-circle wall quadrant or mural quadrant (rotatable by 180 °) built by John Bird. Le Monnier adapted and used a version in 1774.

- Histoire céleste (1741)
- Théorie des comètes (1743, a translation, with additions of Halley's Synopsis)
- Institutions astronomiques (1746, an improved translation of John Keill's textbook)
- Nouveau zodiaque (1755)
- Observations de la lune, du soleil, et des étoiles fixes (1751–1775)
- Lois du magnétisme (1776–1778)
