= Johan Lindquist =

Swedish clockmaker

Johan Lindquist of Stockholm was an important 18th-century Swedish clock and watch maker. He was a pupil of Julien Le Roy in Paris in, perhaps, the 1740s, and in the late 1750s was appointed clock-maker to King Adolf Frederick of Sweden. He died on 4 June 1779. He numbered all his pieces, and was at approximately no. 620 by the time of his death.

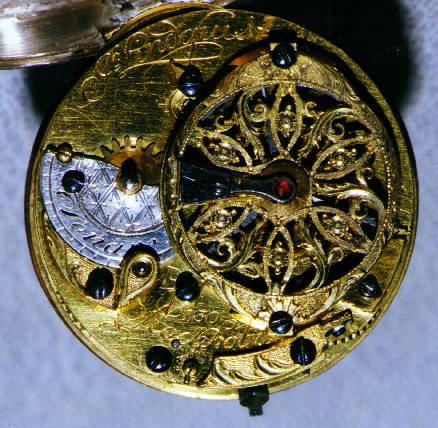
The back-plate of a 1760 pocket watch by Johan Lindquist of Stockholm, numbered 130. There is slight damage to the silver disc. A rare royal crown mark is also visible.

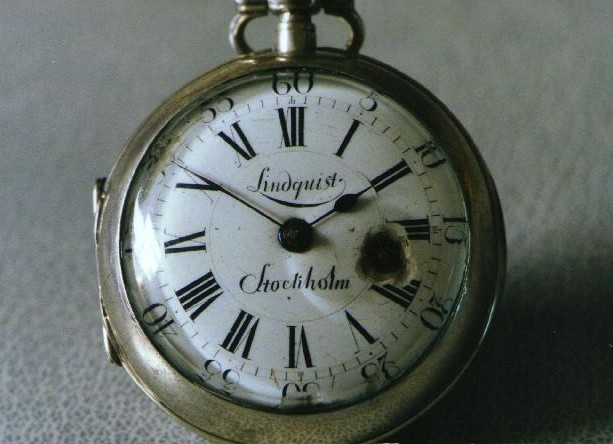
The rather worn dial of a 1760 pocket watch by Johan Lindquist of Stockholm. The silver case dates from the mid-19th century.

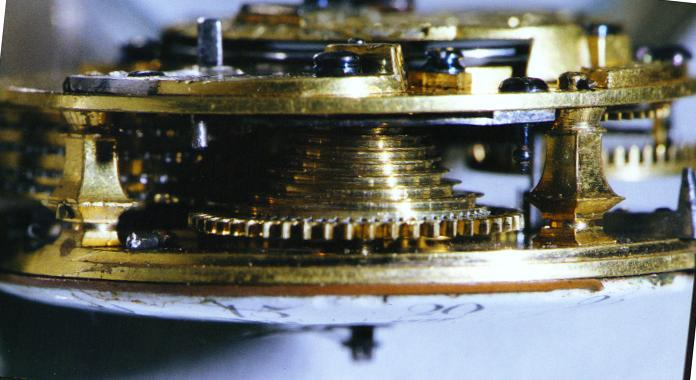
A fusee on a 1760 pocket watch by Johan Lindquist of Stockholm.
