= Julien-David Le Roy =

French architect and archaeologist (1724–1803)

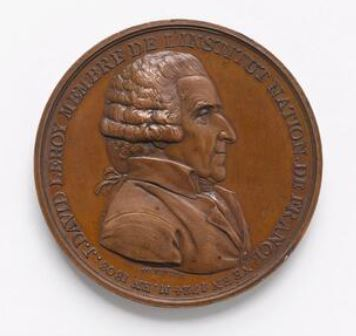
Julien-David Le Roy; medallion by Pierre-Simon-Benjamin Duvivier

Julien-David Le Roy or Leroy (French pronunciation: [ʒyljɛ̃ david ləʁwa]; 6 May 1724 in Paris – 28 January 1803 in Paris) was an 18th-century French architect and archaeologist, who engaged in a rivalry with Britons James Stuart and Nicholas Revett over who would publish the first professional description of the Acropolis of Athens since an early 1682 work by Antoine Desgodetz. Le Roy succeeded in printing his Ruins of the Most Beautiful Monuments of Greece four years ahead of Stuart and Revett.

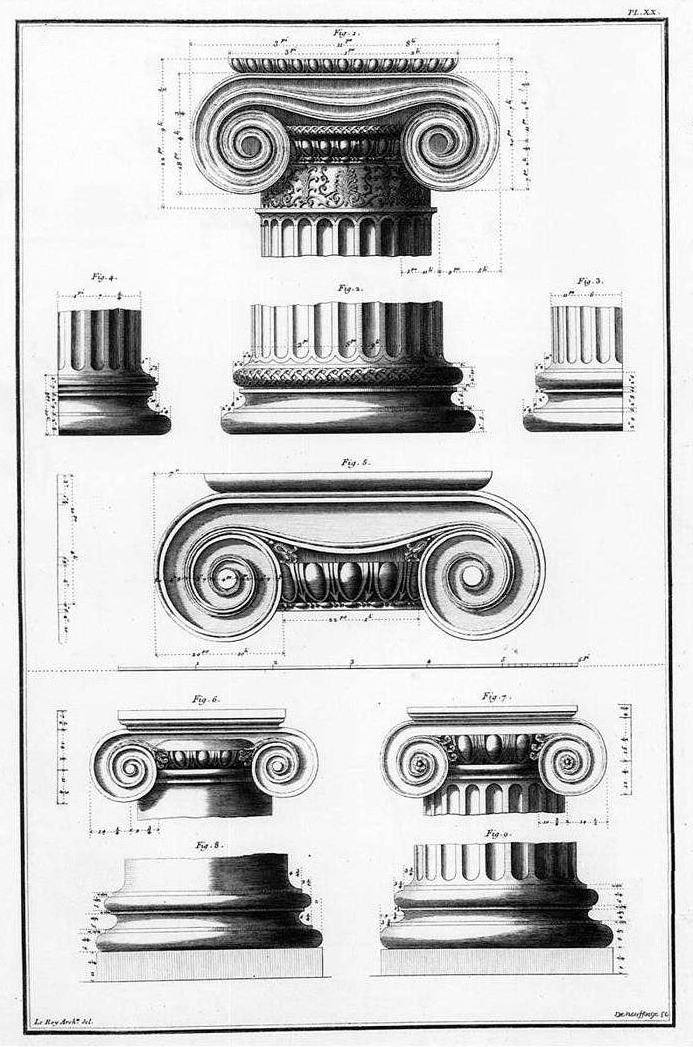
Plate of the Ionic order from Les Ruines des plus beaux monuments de la Grèce.

== Athens study ==
Stuart and Revett were researching Athens since 1748 but Le Roy had an advantage in accessing the ruins due to good relations between France and the Ottoman Empire. Le Roy's studies, supported by Comte de Caylus and his art circle, recruited the finest engravers and architects to produce illustrations, and became sort of a national project for the pre-revolutionary France. Le Roy spent only three months in Athens (compared to three years taken by Stuart and Revett); he researched Greek monuments in a wide, universal cultural context, comparing them with Roman legacy, and travelled to Constantinople to study the Byzantine development of the Greek tradition.

Le Roy rushed his Les Ruines des plus beaux monuments de la Grèce (Ruins of the Most Beautiful Monuments of Greece) into print in 1758. Stuart and Revett delayed their first volume till 1762 and discouraged their readers by filling it with lesser monuments instead of the expected Parthenon. The delay provided them time to examine Le Roy's book and pinpoint its weaknesses and errors in a bitter critique. Le Roy's success alienated not only the Britons who harshly attacked his book and theories but also Piranesi who considered the Frenchman a threat to his national pride and, worse, means of subsistence.

Le Roy responded with a counterargument that an insight in development of a culture is just as worthwhile as meticulous, surgical rendition of antique relics. Unlike the Britons who rushed to copy the Greek models in new buildings, Le Roy stood by his opinion that architecture always follows evolution of the society, and never intended to imitate these models in stone. His book ultimately had a greater impact on practical architecture than Stuart and Revett's, for example, launching the modern tradition of using colonnade in urban design.

Both British and French projects began as mere attempts to expand knowledge of Greek antiques beyond the work of Desgodetz and eventually grew into comparative discourse over Roman and Greek art, starting a wide public debate on their relative merits.

== Biography ==
Julien-David Le Roy, the son of a court clockmaker Julien Le Roy, studied architecture under Jacques-François Blondel (le petit Blondel), and travelled to Rome on an Academy scholarship in 1751–1754. He had three brothers: Pierre (1717–1785) another clockmaker, Jean-Baptiste (1720-1800), a physicist and Encyclopédiste, and Charles (1726–1779), a physician as well as an Encyclopédiste.

Le Roy's ideas were materialized in the Church of Saint Genevieve, a project led by his friend Jacques-Germain Soufflot. Le Roy directly advised Soufflot on the philosophy and history of architecture and provided a classic single-sheet scheme of principal Christian church types, solving the problem of marrying the dome with cross-shaped floorplan.

He was protected by Marc-René Voyer d'Argenson, marquis de Voyer (1722-1782), for who he worked in his hôtel de Voyer in Paris, near the Palais-Royal in the 1760s. Le Roy was elected a member of the American Philosophical Society in 1786. An important correspondence with him is conserved in Poitiers (France), published in 2020 in Le Journal des Savants, the oldest scientist review in Europe (17th century).

== Sources ==
- Barry Bergdoll (2000). European architecture, 1750-1890. Oxford University Press. ISBN 9780192842220. ISBN 0192842226, ISBN 978-0-19-284222-0.
- Liane Lefaivre, Alexander Tzonis (2004). The emergence of modern architecture: a documentary history from 1000 to 1810. Routledge. ISBN 9780415260251. ISBN 0415260256, ISBN 978-0-415-26025-1.
- "Le Roy, Julien-David". Dictionary of Art Historians. Archived from the original on 2016-01-27.
- Philippe Cachau : "Julien-David Le Roy (1724-1803). Correspondance avec le marquis de Voyer (1766-1777)", Journal des Savants, n° 1, 2020, p. 207-304.
- Philippe Cachau, Les décors de l'hôtel de Voyer d'Argenson, dit chancellerie d'Orléans (1765-1772).Recherche et analyse des trois pièces sur le jardin du Palais-Royal, study for World Monuments Fund, Paris, 2013.
- Christopher Drew Armstrong, Julien-David Leroy and the making of architectural history, London and New York, 2012.
