= Charles Le Roy (physician) =

French physician and encyclopedian (1726–1779)

- Born: 12 February 1726; Paris
- Died: 12 December 1779 (aged 53); Paris
- Occupation: Physician

Charles Le Roy (French pronunciation: [ʃaʁl lə ʁwa]; 12 February 1726 – 12 December 1779) was an 18th-century French physician and Encyclopédiste. An advisor to the king, he was professor of medicine at the University of Montpellier, a member of the French Academy of Sciences, the Royal Society, the Société royale de médecine and the Academies of Montpellier, Nîmes and Toulouse.

== Life ==
Charles Le Roy was the youngest of the four sons of French watchmaker Julien Le Roy (1686–1759). He had three brothers, the watchmaker Pierre Le Roy (1717–1785), the physicist Jean-Baptiste Le Roy and the architect Julien-David Le Roy (1724–1803). His paternal uncle Pierre Le Roy (1687-1762) was also a watchmaker. His father gave him an excellent education. Because he was weak and vulnerable, the young Le Roy was sent to the Mediterranean city of Montpellier where he began to study medicine, which he continued in Italy. From there he went to Paris. But soon he was forced for health reasons, to settle again in Montpellier.

He obtained his doctorate at the local medical school and soon became a professor. His teaching was very highly considered because of his thoroughness and accuracy. He had a wealth of experience, and it was a great loss for Montpellier when he returned to Paris in 1777 at the urging of his family. But this return to the capital proved fatal, for he died two years later.

== Achievements ==
In 1755, Le Roy tried to cure a patient of his blindness by sending electric current pulses through a wire wound around the head. The blind man perceived vivid flashes of light, but could not be cured. This is considered the first experimental evidence that nerves could be electrically stimulated, 36 years before the description of electrophysiological phenomena by Luigi Galvani.

== Works ==
- 1755: Mémoire où l'on rend compte de quelques tentatives que l'on a faites pour guérir plusieurs maladies par l'électricité, Hist Acad Roy Sciences (Paris), Mémoire Math Phys.;60:87–95.
- 1758: De aquarum mineralium natura et usu, Montpellier,
- 1759: Quæstiones chemicæ duodecim pro cathedra vacante, Montpellier,
- 1759: De purgantibus. Montpellier,
- 1766–1784: Mémoires et observations de médecine, Montpellier,
- 1771: Mélanges de physique, de chimie et de médecine, Paris,

Le Roy regularly cooperated to Volumes I, II, III, VI and VII of the Encyclopédie by Diderot and D'Alembert.

== Bibliography ==
- Pierre Larousse, Grand Dictionnaire universel du XIX^{e} siècle, vol. 10, Paris, Administration du grand Dictionnaire universel, (p. 399).
