= Julien Le Roy =

French clock and watchmaker

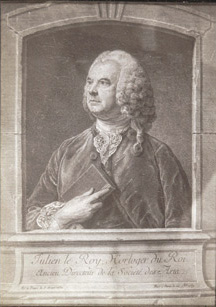
Julien Le Roy

Julien Le Roy (French pronunciation: [ʒyljɛ̃ lə ʁwa]; 1686–1759) was a major 18th-century Parisian clockmaker and watchmaker.

He was born in Tours, Touraine, in 1686, the scion of four previous generations of clockmakers. By the age of 13, had already made his first clock. In 1699, he moved to Paris for further training. He became maître horloger in 1713 and later juré of his guild. Further appointments followed, including the Directorship of the Société des Arts, but the pinnacle of his achievement was being appointed clockmaker (Horloger Ordinaire du Roi) to King Louis XV in 1739. He carried on his business from premises in the Rue du Harlay until his death in 1759.

His son Pierre Le Roy (1717–1785), a brilliant clock-maker in his own right, carried on the business until the early 1780s. Another son, Julien-David Le Roy (1724–1803), was a neo-classical architect and archaeologist, author of the Ruins of the Most Beautiful Monuments of Greece. His third son, Charles was a physician and Encyclopédiste, and his fourth, Jean-Baptiste Le Roy, a physicist and Encyclopédiste as well.

Examples of his work can be found in many major museums around the world, including the Louvre in Paris, and the Victoria and Albert Museum in London.

In 1740 the recently founded Toulouse Observatory acquired a Julien le Roi clock for the observatory.

== See also ==
- Johan Lindquist
