= Dominique Proust =

French astrophysicist and organist

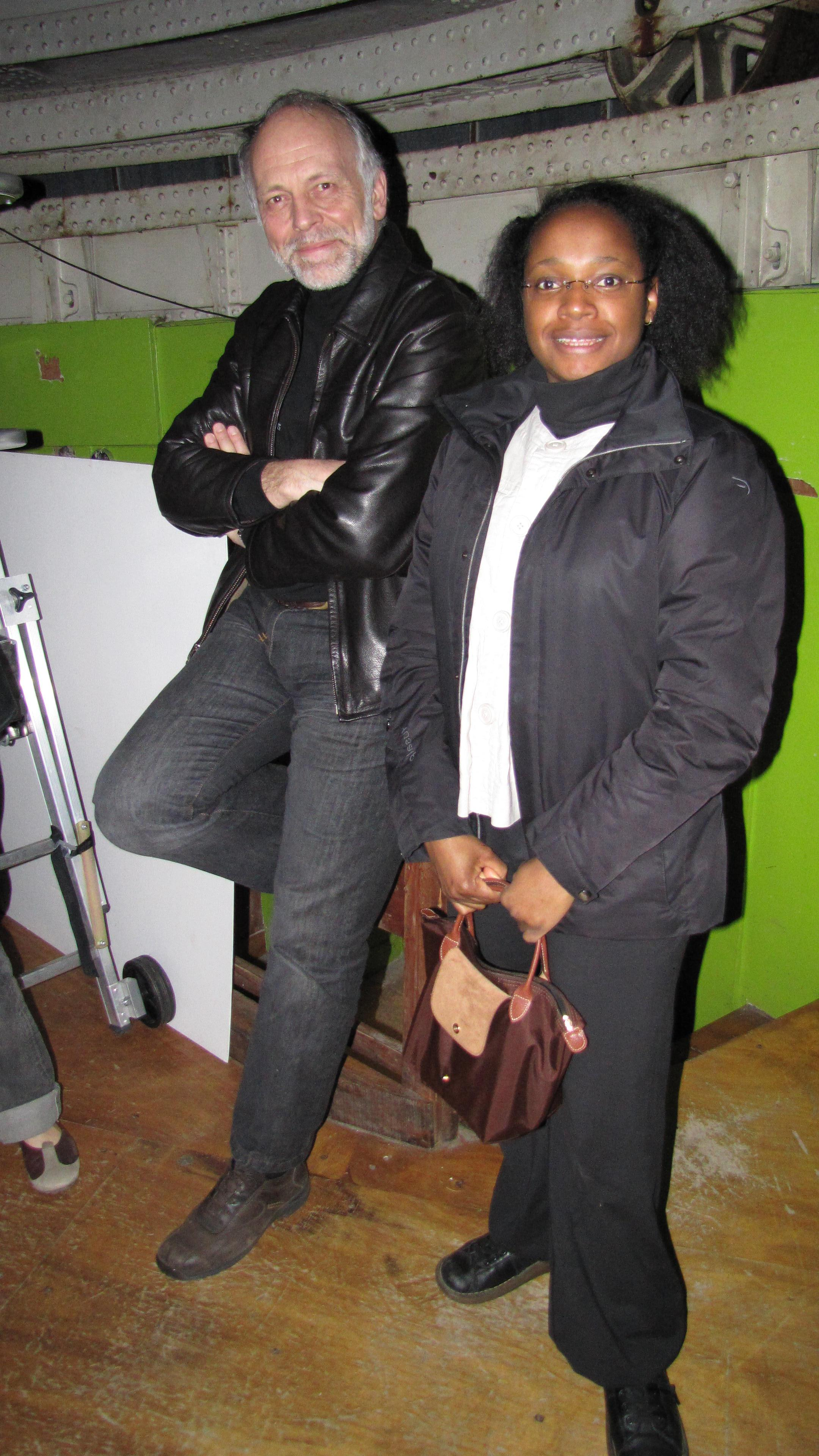
Proust (left) with a student

Dominique Proust is a French astrophysicist and an organist. He is a research engineer at CNRS, Observatoire de Paris-Meudon.

== Astronomy ==
After a doctoral thesis devoted to stellar physics, his work was directed towards cosmology: the formation and evolution of large structures in the universe, galaxies, quasars. He worked in the major international observatories, and observed with the large telescopes at Haute Provence, Pic du Midi, Canary Islands, Andalusia, Chile, California, and Hawaii.

Dominique Proust is one of the founders of the "Astronomie vers Tous" (Astronomy to All) of Paris Observatory in order to teach astronomy to those who would not otherwise have access. He teaches astrophysics in Sign Language for the deaf community.

In addition to his research and teaching, he is the author of several books on astronomy for the general public. He has co-produced music and science program and appears regularly on radio and television.

== Music ==
Dominique Proust studied the organ with the organist of Notre Dame de Paris Pierre Moreau, Jacques Marichal, and Daniel Roth, the current organist of St. Sulpice, Paris. Dominique Proust is organist at the Church of Our Lady of the Assumption at Meudon. He is a member of the regional commission of the organ. He has given concerts in Europe, Canada, Brazil, Chile, Peru and Australia. International critics praised his recordings of William Herschel and Pierre Moreau. There was also a performance of Das Schwanenküken by Buxtehude.

== Popular works ==
- Les étoiles, Collection Points Sciences, Le Seuil, 1996
- Les Galaxies et structure de l'Univers, Collection Points Sciences, Le Seuil 1997
- L'Harmonie des Sphères, Collection Science Ouverte, Le Seuil 2001
- Où sont les autres ?, Collection Science Ouverte, Le Seuil 2007
- Les mains dans les étoiles, Dictionnaire encyclopédique d'astronomie pour la Langue des Signes Française, avec Daniel Abbou, Nasro Chab, Yves Delaporte, Carole Marion et Blandine Proust, édition de Burillier 2010
