= Guido Dettoni della Grazia =

Italian sculptor (b. 1945)

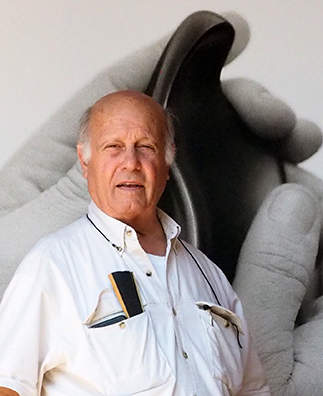
- Born: 1945 (age 80–81); Milan
- Known for: Tau, MARIA

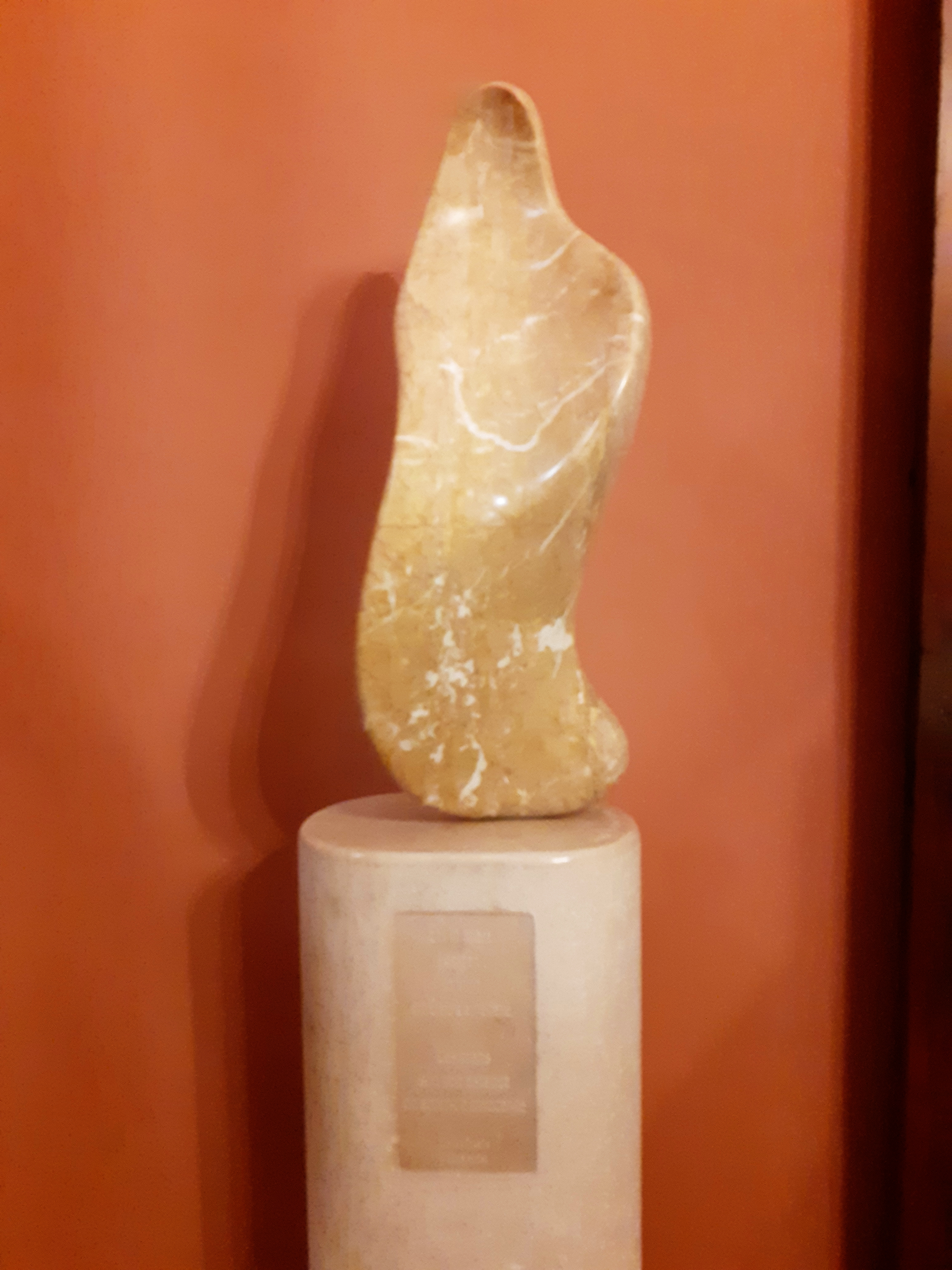
Sculpture by Guido Dettoni della Grazia in Museu Diocesà de Tarragona

Guido Dettoni della Grazia is an Italian visual artist and sculptor of sacred works. He has developed a following among pilgrims and private collectors who have collected his art since the 1960s. His Tau sculpture is in the Basilica of St. Francis of Assisi in Italy, and it and MARIA have been featured in guide books and sites such as Lonely Planet Umbria, Rick Steves' Italy, and TripAdvisor. MARIA has been installed permanently at the Church of Saint Sulpice in Paris, the Church of Santa Maria Delle Rose in Assisi, and major churches in Austria (Jesuit Church of Innsbruck), the Czech Republic (Church of Our Lady of the Snows, Prague), France (Biennale of Contemporary Sacred Art), Germany (Old Saint Nicholas Church, Frankfurt), Italy, Portugal, Singapore, and Spain.

== Early life and education ==
He was born in Milan, Italy, in 1945 to Maria della Grazia, a sculptor, and Franco Dettoni, an entrepreneur and inventor. He has a brother, Luca, and a sister, Parisina. As a child he played in the park at Milan's Castello Sforzesco, and his engagement with mud near a fountain inspired his first hand sculptures. What he calls "gameplay and joy" led him to create mud shapes that appeared and disappeared in his hands as he named them, and this hand-mold style continues in his work to this day in his style, "Handsmatter."

Dettoni attended a Jesuit school, Charles Borromeo, in Milan. One day when he was 14, he read the story of the Greek philosopher Bias of Priene in Cicero's Paradoxa Stoicorum. When Bias of Priene was asked why he was empty handed when fleeing the destruction of his city, he replied: omnia mea mecum porto (All that's mine I carry with me). Dettoni refers to this as his revelation.

== Career ==
He moved from Italy to Germany at age 15, finding a job in a factory in Düsseldorf and studying with artists, working in traditional pencil before moving to color studies. In the 1960s he left Germany for Austria, and then spent time in Spain and Venezuela, settling for a time at the Art Workshop in Caracas. He refers to his unique sculptural style as "Handsmatter," which he developed in the 1970s. He created his first images of MARIA in 1995 with wax from Puebla, Mexico. He first exhibited this work in Barcelona in January, 1998.
