= Sophie-Véronique Cauchefer-Choplin =

French organist

Sophie-Véronique Colette Claude Cauchefer-Choplin (née Cauchefer, born 28 December 1959) is a French organist who has served as co-titular organist of the Church of Saint-Sulpice in Paris since 2023.

== Early life ==
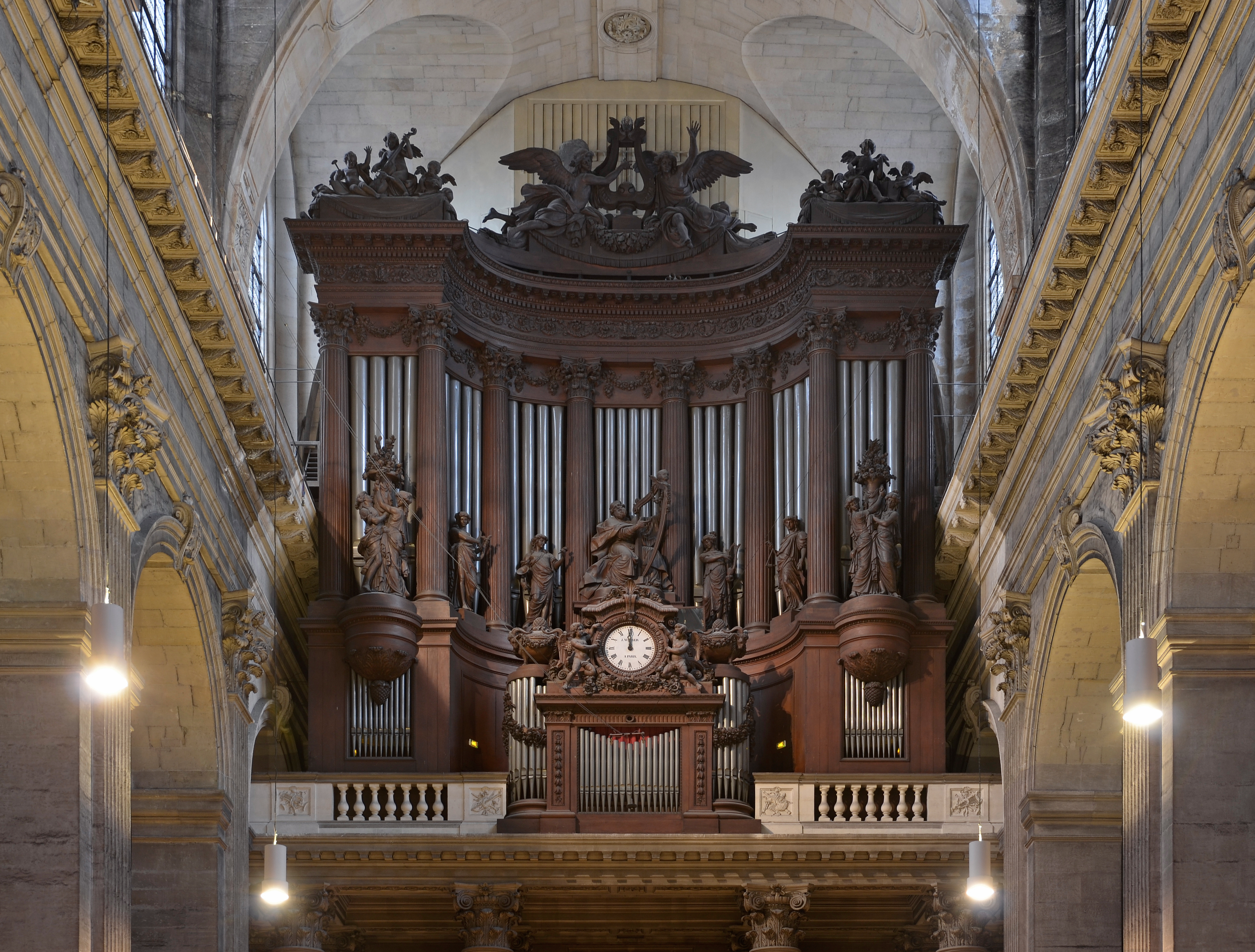
The organ of Saint-Sulpice, Paris, rebuilt in 1862 by Aristide Cavaillé-Coll.

Born into a family of musicians in Nogent-le-Rotrou (Eure-et-Loir department, France), Cauchefer-Choplin began piano lessons at a young age and took up the organ at the age of 14. She studied at the École National de Musique in Le Mans and was awarded a prize by the French Ministry of Culture in 1980. Continuing her studies at the Conservatoire de Paris under Rolande Falcinelli, she won first prize in organ and improvisation, as well as prizes in harmony, fugue and counterpoint.

In 1990, after further training with Loïc Mallié, she became the first woman to win the second prize in improvisation at the Chartres International Organ Improvisation Competition.

== Career ==
In 1983 Cauchefer-Choplin was appointed organist at the Church of Saint Jean-Baptiste-de-la-Salle in Paris, stepping down from the role in 2013. In 1985, she was appointed deputy titular organist of the Church of Saint-Sulpice, under Daniel Roth, having auditioned while pregnant. In 2023 she succeeded Roth as co-titular organist, alongside Karol Mossakowski.

She has been a professor at the Royal College of Music in London since 2008 and a visiting professor at Yale University in the United States of America.

Cauchefer-Choplin gives concerts and improvisation masterclasses around the world and serves on the juries of national and international competitions. She has released several CDs of her recordings.

== Personal life ==
Her brother is the cellist Pierre Cauchefer and her daughter Pauline is an actress.

== Honors and awards ==
Knight of the Order of Legion of Honour
