= Louis-Nicolas Séjan =

French organist and composer

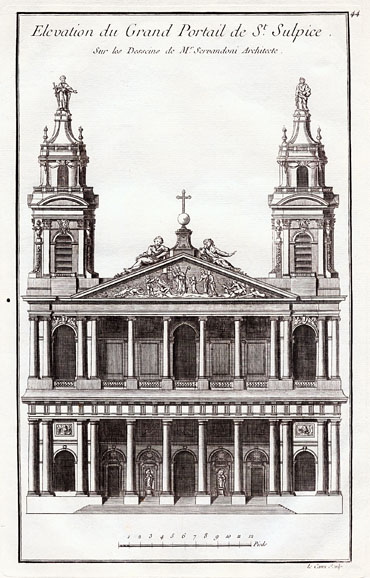
Façade of the Church of Saint-Sulpice in Paris.

Louis-Nicolas Séjan (10 June 1786 – March or April 1849) was a French organist and composer.

== Biography ==
The son of Nicolas Séjan, he succeeded him on the organ of the Church of Saint-Sulpice in Paris and that of the Hôtel des Invalides. When the Chapelle Royale was closed in 1830, he lost his position as organist. In 1848, his salary at Saint-Sulpice was so reduced that he was forced to resign. He left Paris in March 1848 and died shortly after at the age of 63.

He has left works for organ, chamber music and an opera, Fénella.
