= Daniel Roth (organist) =

French organist and composer (born 1941)

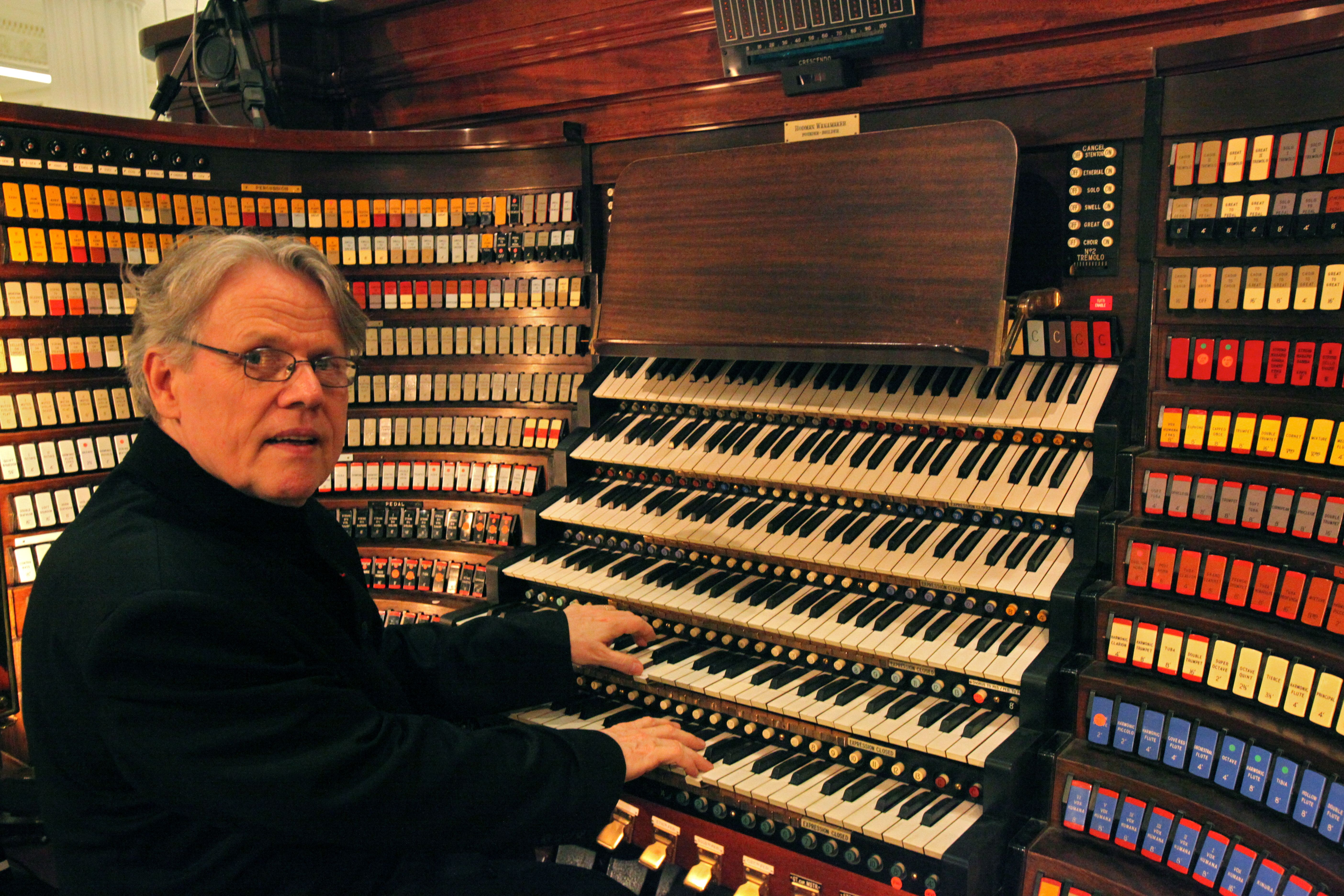
- Roth seated at the Wanamaker Organ, Philadelphia, Pennsylvania, 2010
- Born: François Daniel Roth; 31 October 1942 (age 84); Mulhouse, Grand Est, France
- Education: Conservatoire de Paris
- Occupations: Organist; composer; musicologist; music educator
- Years active: 1963–present
- Employers: Church of Saint-Sulpice; Basilique du Sacré-Coeur; Basilica of the National Shrine of the Immaculate Conception; Catholic University of America; Frankfurt University of Music and Performing Arts
- Style: Classical
- Spouse: Odile Josèphe-Georgette Mangin
- Children: 4
- Website: www.danielroth.fr

François Daniel Roth (born 31 October 1942) is a French organist, composer, musicologist, and music educator. He was the titular organist of the Church of Saint-Sulpice, Paris, from 1985 to 2023, and is currently the emeritus titular organist.

== Early life and education ==
Roth was born in Mulhouse to René and Angèle (née Higelin) Roth. He began his musical training at the conservatoire in his hometown with Joseph Victor Meyer. In 1960, he entered the Conservatoire de Paris, where he graduated with five first prizes: in organ and improvisation (1963, taught by Rolande Falcinelli), harmony (1962, taught by Maurice Duruflé), counterpoint and fugue (1963, taught by Marcel Bitsch), and piano accompaniment (1970, taught by Henriette Puig-Roget). He later continued his organ studies with Marie-Claire Alain after graduating from Falcinelli's class.

== Career ==
=== As organist ===
In 1963, Roth became Rolande Falcinelli's deputy of the great organ at Basilique du Sacré-Coeur in Paris. He succeeded her as titular organist in 1973 and held this position until 1985, when he was appointed titular organist at the Church of Saint-Sulpice.

Roth retired from Saint-Sulpice in 2023 and was succeeded by Sophie-Véronique Cauchefer-Choplin and Karol Mossakowski as co-titular organists. He was appointed emeritus titular organist and continues to play at the church for one recital and one mass per month.

=== Teaching positions ===
From 1974 to 1976, he was artist-in-residence at the National Shrine of the Immaculate Conception and professor of organ at the Catholic University of America, both in Washington, D.C. He also held teaching positions at the conservatoires of Marseille (1974−1979), Strasbourg (1979−1988) and Saarbrücken (1988−1995). From 1995 to 2007, he taught organ performance and improvisation at the Frankfurt University of Music and Performing Arts. He was also a consultant for the new organ built by the Karl Schuke company at the Philharmonie Luxembourg, which he dedicated in 2005.

== Awards and recognition ==
Roth has won several prestigious organ competitions, including the competition of the "Amis de l'orgue" and the Grand Prix in organ performance and improvisation in the Concours de Chartres in 1971 (alongside Yves Devernay).

He is a Chevalier de la Légion d'Honneur, an Officier de l'Ordre des Arts et des Lettres and an Honorary Fellow of the Royal College of Organists. In 2006, he received the European Prize of European sacred music from the German Schwäbisch Gmünd Festival.

== Personal life ==
Roth was married to Odile Josèphe-Georgette Mangin (9 June 1939 − 9 March 2015), with whom he had four children, including the painter Anne-Marie Roth Baud (born 1968), the conductor and flautist François-Xavier Roth and the violist Vincent Roth.

== Compositions ==
=== Organ solo ===
- Cinq Versets sur Veni Creator for organ manualiter (composed 1965. In: L'organiste liturgique n°53. Paris: Éditions Schola Cantorum)
- Évocation de la Pentecôte (composed 1979. Paris: Leduc, 1979/revised 1996, unpublished)
- Final Te Deum (composed 1981. Kassel: Bärenreiter, 1993)
- Introduction et Canzona (composed 1977–1990. Leutkirch/Allgäu: Pro Organo, 1992)
- Joie, Douleur et Gloire de Marie (composed 1990. London: Novello, 1990)
- Hommage à César Franck (composed 1990. Paris: Leduc, 1993)
- Après une Lecture... (composed 1993. In: 1er recueil d'œuvres pour orgue. Paris: Éditions Billaudot, 1993)
- Pour la nuit de Noël (composed 1993. Paris: Leduc, 1993):
  - Prélude "Veni, veni Emmanuel"
  - Communion
  - Postlude
- Triptyque – Hommage à Pierre Cochereau (composed 1995. Paris: Leduc, 1996):
  - Prélude
  - Andante
  - Toccata
- Petite Rhapsodie sur une chanson alsacienne (In: Elsässische Orgelmusik aus vier Jahrhunderten. Mainz: Schott, 1998)
- Artizarra – Fantaisie sur un chant populaire basque, pour la fête de I'Epiphanie (composed 1999. Mainz: Schott, 2002)
- Fantaisie fuguée sur Regina caeli (Mainz: Schott, 2007)
- Livre d'orgue pour le Magnificat, Hommage au Facteur d'orgues Aristide Cavaillé-Coll :
  - Vol. 1 (Paris: Éditions Association Boëllmann-Gigout, 2007):
    1. (a) Magnificat
      (b) Et exsultavit
    2. Quia respexit
    3. Quia fecit
    4. Et misericordia
    5. Fecit potentiam
  - Vol. 2 (Paris: Éditions Association Boëllmann-Gigout, 2011):
    6. Deposuit
    7. Esurientes
    8. Suscepit
    9. Sicut locutus est
    10. Gloria Patri
- Christus factus est – Fantaisie sur le graduel de la messe du Jeudi Saint (Sampzon: Delatour France, 2012)
- Contrastes (In: "Kölner Fanfaren - 17 festliche Orgelstücke". St. Augustin: Butz-Verlag, 2012)
- Ut, ré, mi – Fantaisie sur l'hymne à saint Jean Baptiste (Sampzon: Delatour France, 2014)
- Ave maris stella (In: "Orgues nouvelles", October 2014)
- Die Liebe... ein Feuer! La Pentecôte (composed 2015. Sampzon: Delatour France, 2017)
- Deux courtes pièces liturgiques (In: "Orgues nouvelles", June 2019):
  - Alleluia
  - Méditation
- Prélude pour l'Introït de la messe du jour de Noël, "Puer natus est" (composed 2019. in manuscript)

=== Organ for four hands ===
- Diptyque (composed 2009. Sampzon: Delatour France, 2011):
  - Andante
  - Allegro giocoso

=== Two organs ===
- Fantaisie-Dialogue (Sampzon: Delatour France, 2013)
- Quatre Pièces (composed in 2017, Manuscript)
  - Prélude
  - Offertoire
  - Communion
  - Sortie

=== Chamber music ===
- Légende for oboe and piano (Paris: Éditions Billaudot, 1989)
- Aïn Karim – Fantasia for flute and organ (Mainz: Schott, 1998)
- Pièce pour viola and organ (composed 2014. Manuscript)

=== Vocal works ===
- Reine du ciel a capella (Strasbourg: Éditions Caecilia, 1977)
- Notre Père a capella (Strasbourg: Éditions Caecilia, 1977)
- Gebt Zeugnis! for soloists, choir and organ (Mainz: Schott, 1998)
- Missa Brevis for SATB choir and organ (composed 1964/1998. Mainz: Schott, 2001):
  - Kyrie
  - Gloria
  - Sanctus
  - Agnus Dei
- In manus tuas Domine for SATB (St. Augustin: Butz-Verlag, 2002)
- Ego sum panis for SATB choir and organ (St. Augustin: Butz-Verlag, 2005)
- Missa de archangelis for SATB choir and organ (Sampzon: Delatour France, 2006):
  - Kyrie
  - Sanctus
  - Benedictus
  - Agnus Dei
- 3 Motets for mixed choir a capella (Sampzon: Delatour France, 2006):
  - Ave Maria
  - Dignare me, o Jesu
  - Regina Caeli
- Ave Maria for soprano and organ (Sampzon: Delatour France, 2012)
- Missa festiva Orbis factor for mixed choir and organ (Sampzon: Delatour France, 2013)
- Missa beuronensis for organ and gregorian chant (St. Augustin: Butz-Verlag, 2016)
- Psalm 124: "Unsere Seele ist entronnen" (composed 2017. Manuscript)
- Cantata "Nun lobet Gott im hohen Thron" (composed 2017. Manuscript)
- Jubilate Deo for mixed choir a capella (composed 2020. Manuscript)

=== Orchestra ===
- Licht im Dunkel for organ, piano and orchestra
  1. L'Espérance (Poème for orchestra) (Mainz: Schott, 2005)
  2. L'Amour (for organ, piano and orchestra) (Mainz: Schott, 2009)
  3. La Joie (Fantaisie for organ, piano and orchestra) (Mainz: Schott, 2007)

=== Transcriptions for organ ===
- César Franck: Interlude symphonique from the oratorio "Rédemption" (Kassel: Bärenreiter, 1996)
- Camille Saint-Saëns: Scherzo from Six Duos op. 8 for harmonium and piano (Paris: Éditions Jobert, 2001)
- César Franck: Symphony in D minor for orchestra; transcription after the composer's piano version for four hands (unpublished)

== Bibliography ==
- Adolph, Wolfram: "Schöpferisch-musikalische Empathie. Daniel Roth zum 70. Geburtstag" (Organ – Journal für die Orgel 15, no. 3 (2012): 16–19).
- Dub-Attenti, Pierre-François and Zerbini, Christophe (eds.), Daniel Roth, Grand chœur. Entretiens avec Pierre-François Dub-Attenti et Christophe Zerbini, Volume I. Paris: Éditions Hortus, 2019. ISBN 978-2-910582-22-7.
- Dub-Attenti, Pierre-François and Zerbini, Christophe (eds.), Daniel Roth, Grand chœur. Entretiens avec Pierre-François Dub-Attenti et Christophe Zerbini, Volume II. Paris: Éditions Hortus, 2019. ISBN 978-2-910582-23-4.
- Hommage à Daniel Roth. Ein Künstlerportrait. Sulz am Neckar: ORGANpromotion, 2007. OP 6002 (DVD & CD).
- Orgeln haben eine Seele. Daniel Roth und die Cavaillé-Coll-Orgeln. TV documentation by Nele Münchmeyer. Mainz: ZDF/3Sat, 1994.
- Petersen, Birger (ed.). Licht im Dunkel – Lumière dans les ténèbres. Festschrift Daniel Roth zum 75. Geburtstag. Bonn: Dr. J. Butz Musikverlag, 2017. ISBN 978-3-928412-23-0.
- Reifenberg, Peter: "Daniel Roth – Botschafter der großen Orgel von St. Sulpice" (Organ – Journal für die Orgel 2, no. 4 (1999): 30–36).
- Roth, Daniel. Le Grand-Orgue A. Cavaillé-Coll, Mutin de la Basilique du Sacré-Cœur de Montmartre à Paris (La Flûte harmonique, Numéro spécial 1985). Paris: Association A. Cavaillé-Coll, 1985.
- Roth, Daniel. "Einige Gedanken zur Interpretation des Orgelwerks von César Franck, zu seiner Orgel und zur Lemmens-Tradition." In: Orgel, Orgelmusik und Orgelspiel. Festschrift Michael Schneider zum 75. Geburtstag, edited by Christoph Wolff, 111–117. Kassel: Bärenreiter, 1985.
- Roth, Daniel, and Günter Lade. Die Cavaillé-Coll-Mutin-Orgel der Basilika Sacré-Coeur in Paris. Langen bei Bregenz: Edition Lade, 1992.
- Roth, Daniel, and Pierre-François Dub-Attenti. "L’orgue néo-classique et le grand orgue Aristide Cavaillé-Coll de Saint-Sulpice." L'Orgue 295-296 (2011).
- Roth, Daniel: "'Le plus bel orgue du monde'. Aspekte der Registrierung Bach'scher Orgelmusik auf Cavaillé-Coll-Orgeln, dargestellt am Beispiel der großen Orgel von Saint-Sulpice, Paris" (Organ – Journal für die Orgel 15, no. 3 (2012): 20–24, 26, 28–29).
- Roth, Daniel, and Pierre-François Dub-Attenti. The Neoclassical Organ and the Great Aristide Cavaillé-Coll Organ of Saint-Sulpice, Paris. London: Rhinegold Publishing, 2014.
- Roth, Daniel, and Pierre-François Dub-Attenti. "Überlegungen zur Interpretation an der Orgel." In: Licht im Dunkel – Lumière dans les ténèbres. Festschrift Daniel Roth zum 75. Geburtstag, edited by Birger Petersen, 265–419. Bonn: Dr. J. Butz Musikverlag, 2017.
- Roth, Daniel. "The use of rubato in the organ works of César Franck." (The American Organist 52, no. 2 (February 2018): 34–38).

Preceded by Jean-Jacques Grunenwald	Titular Organist, Saint Sulpice Paris; 1985–2023	Succeeded by Sophie-Véronique Cauchefer-Choplin and Karol Mossakowski
