= Nicolas Séjan =

French composer and organist

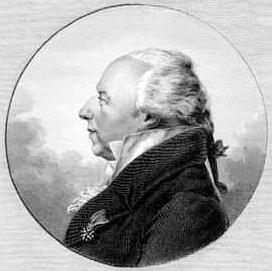
Nicolas Séjan

Nicolas Séjan (17 March 1745 – 16 March 1819) was a French composer and organist, from a family allied to the Forqueray.

Born in Paris, Séjan was one of the best organists of his time. He was co-titular of the organ of Notre-Dame de Paris and many other Parisian churches. He was appointed to the Chapelle Royale in 1789. He lost his charges during the French Revolution, but later recovered some of them.

He left a few works for the harpsichord and the pianoforte as well as the organ.

Nicolas Séjan was Louis-Nicolas Séjan's father, his successor at the church of Saint-Sulpice.

He died in Paris on 16 March 1819 and was buried at Montmartre Cemetery.

Victorine de Chastenay describes Séjan, who was her piano teacher, in her Mémoires.

== See also ==
- French organ school
- Noël varié

Preceded by Pierre-Claude Foucquet	Organist at Notre-Dame de Paris; 1772–1793	Succeeded by Claude-Étienne Luce
Preceded by Claude-Étienne Luce	Organist at the Church of Saint-Sulpice, Paris; 1783–1819	Succeeded by Louis-Nicolas Séjan
