= Saint-Sulpice, Paris =

Church in the 6th arrondissement of Paris

Church of Saint-Sulpice
- French: Église Saint-Sulpice
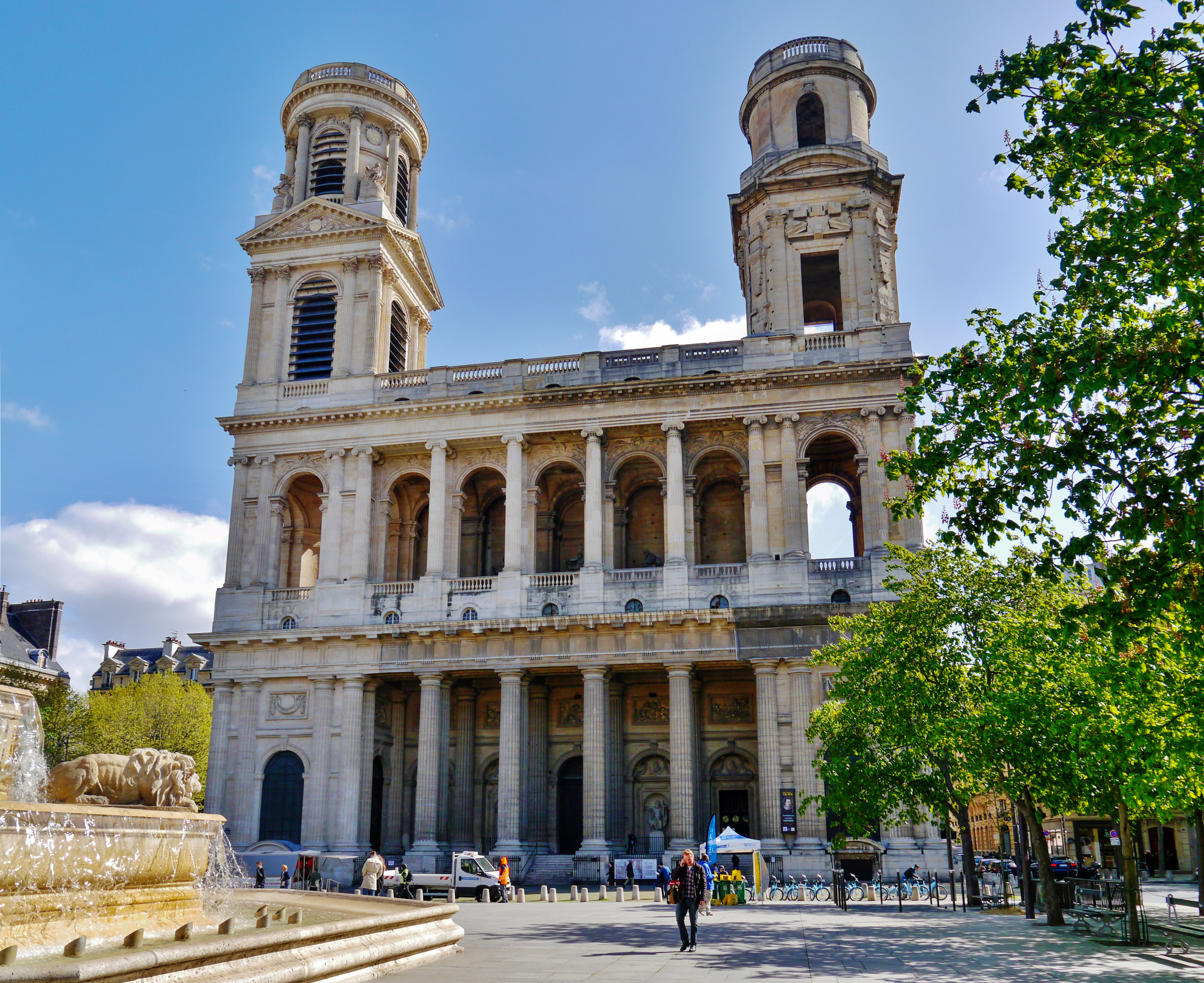

- 48°51′04″N 2°20′05″E
- Location: Place Saint-Sulpice; 6th arrondissement of Paris
- Country: France
- Denomination: Catholic
- Religious institute: Society of the Priests of Saint Sulpice
- Website: paroissesaintsulpice.paris

History
- Status: Parish church
- Dedication: Sulpitius the Pious

Architecture
- Functional status: Active
- Style: Baroque
- Groundbreaking: 1646
- Completed: 1870

Administration
- Province: Paris
- Archdiocese: Paris

Monument historique
- Designated: 1915
- Reference no.: PA00088510

The Church of Saint-Sulpice (French pronunciation: [sɛ̃ sylpis]) is a Catholic church in Paris, France, on the east side of Place Saint-Sulpice, in the 6th arrondissement. It is the second largest church in the city. It is dedicated to Sulpitius the Pious. Construction of the present building, the second on the site, began in 1646. During the 18th century, an elaborate gnomon, the Gnomon of Saint-Sulpice, was constructed in the church. Saint-Sulpice is also known for its Great Organ, one of the most significant organs in the world, and its titular organists, including Charles-Marie Widor and Marcel Dupré.

== History ==
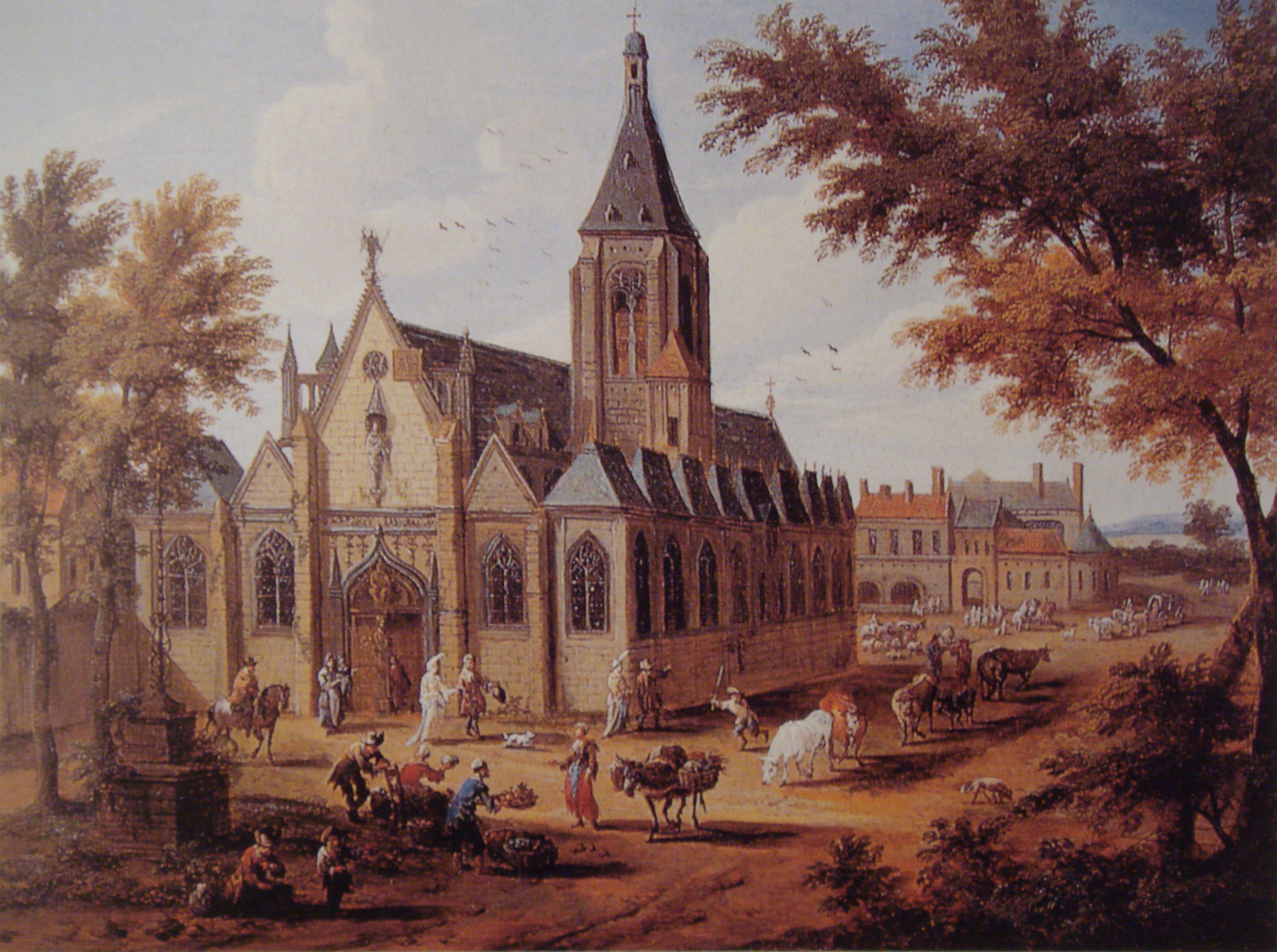
Former Church of Saint-Sulpice, by Mathys Schoevaerdts; 17th century

The present church is the second building on the site, erected over a Romanesque church originally constructed during the 13th century. Additions were made over the centuries, up to 1631. The new building was founded in 1646 by parish priest Jean-Jacques Olier (1608–1657) who had established the Society of Saint-Sulpice, a clerical congregation, and a seminary attached to the church. Anne of Austria laid the first stone.

Construction began in 1646 to designs which had been created in 1636 by Christophe Gamard, but the Fronde interfered, and only the Lady Chapel had been built by 1660, when Daniel Gittard provided a new general design for most of the church. Gittard completed the sanctuary, ambulatory, apsidal chapels, transept, and north portal (1670–1678), after which construction was halted for lack of funds.

Gilles-Marie Oppenord and Giovanni Servandoni, adhering closely to Gittard's designs, supervised further construction (mainly the nave and side-chapels, 1719–1745). The decoration was executed by the brothers Sébastien-Antoine Slodtz (1695–1742) and Paul-Ambroise Slodtz (1702–1758).

In 1723–1724 Oppenord created the north and south portals of the transept with an unusual interior design for the ends: concave walls with nearly engaged Corinthian columns instead of the pilasters found in other parts of the church.

Plan of the church

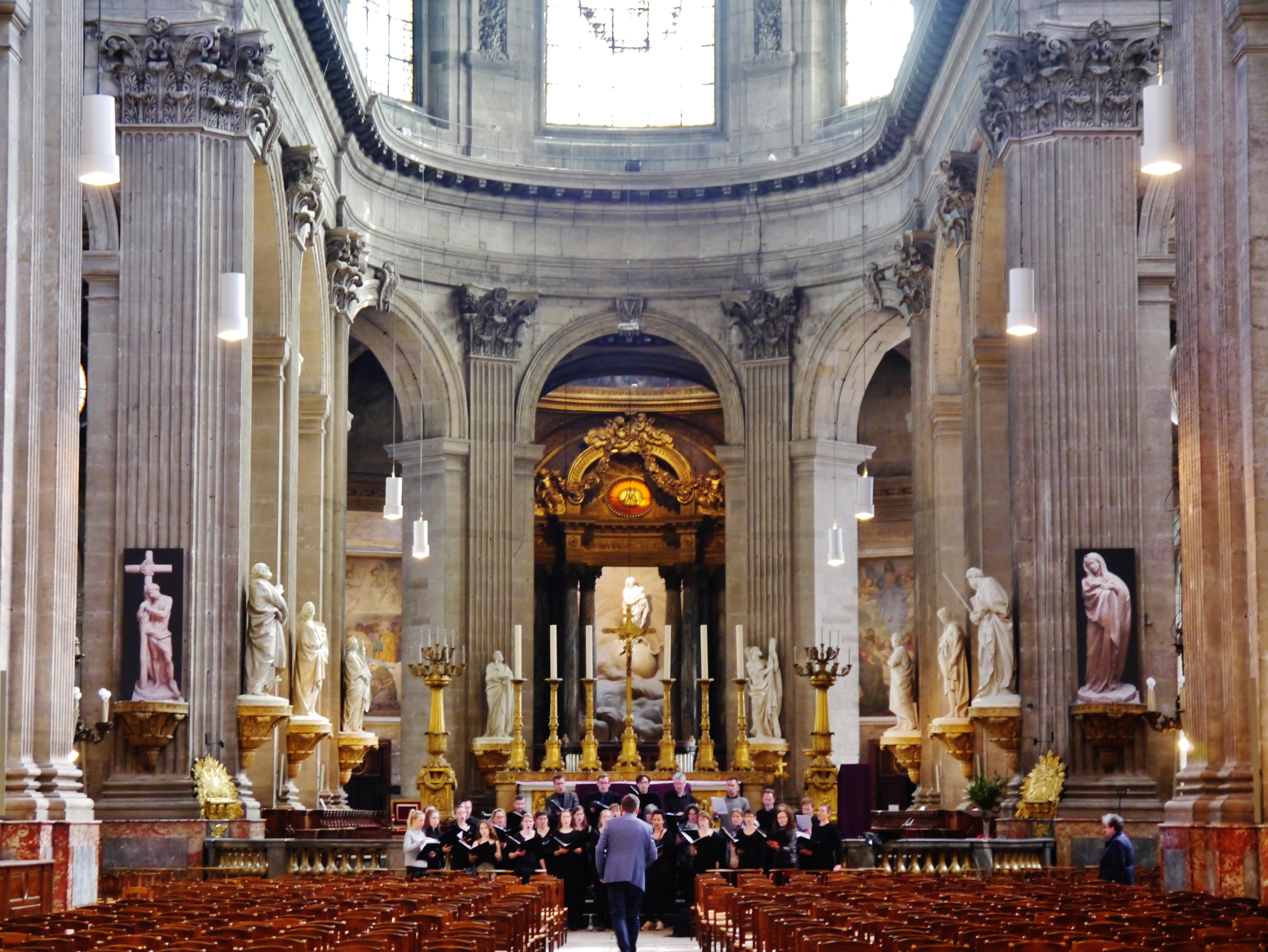
Inner choir with pilasters

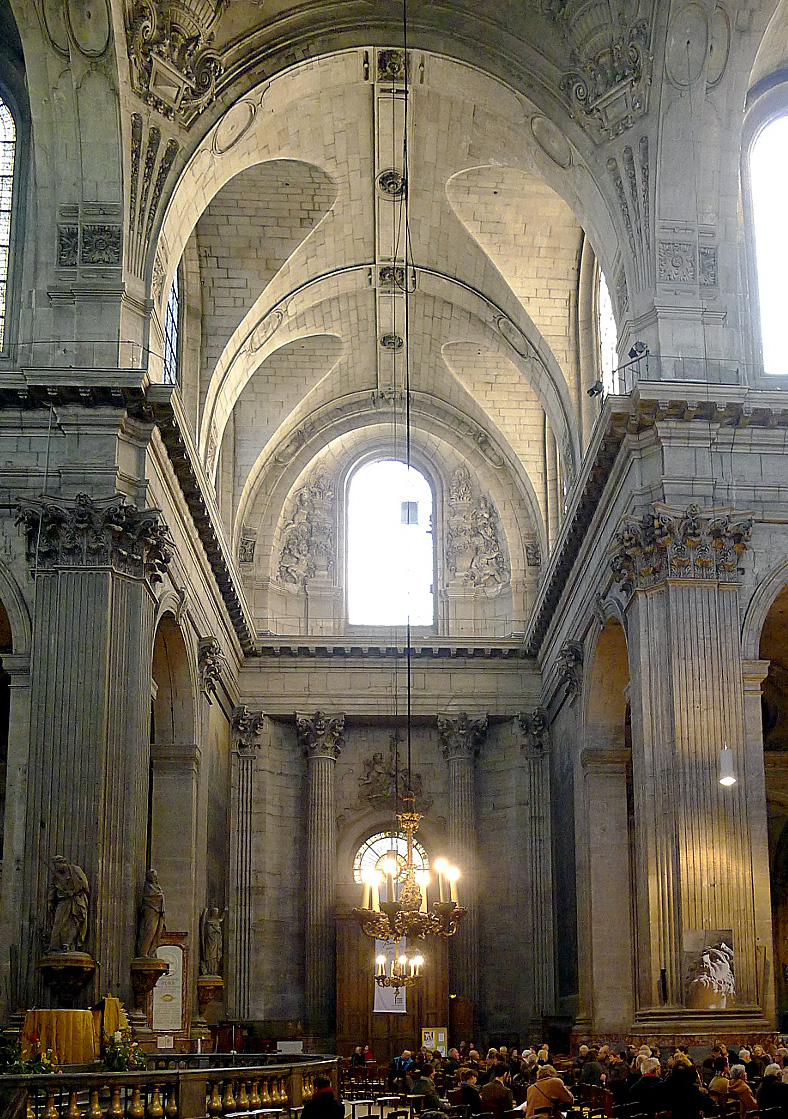
South transept

He also built a bell tower on top of the transept crossing (c. 1725), which threatened to collapse the structure because of its weight and had to be removed. This miscalculation may account for the fact that Oppenord was then relieved of his duties as an architect and restricted to designing decoration.

=== West façade ===
In 1732 a competition for the design of the west façade was won by Servandoni, who was inspired by the entrance elevation of Christopher Wren's Saint Paul's Cathedral in London. The 1739 Turgot map of Paris shows the church without Oppenord's crossing bell tower, but with Servandoni's pedimented façades mostly complete, still lacking, however, its two towers.

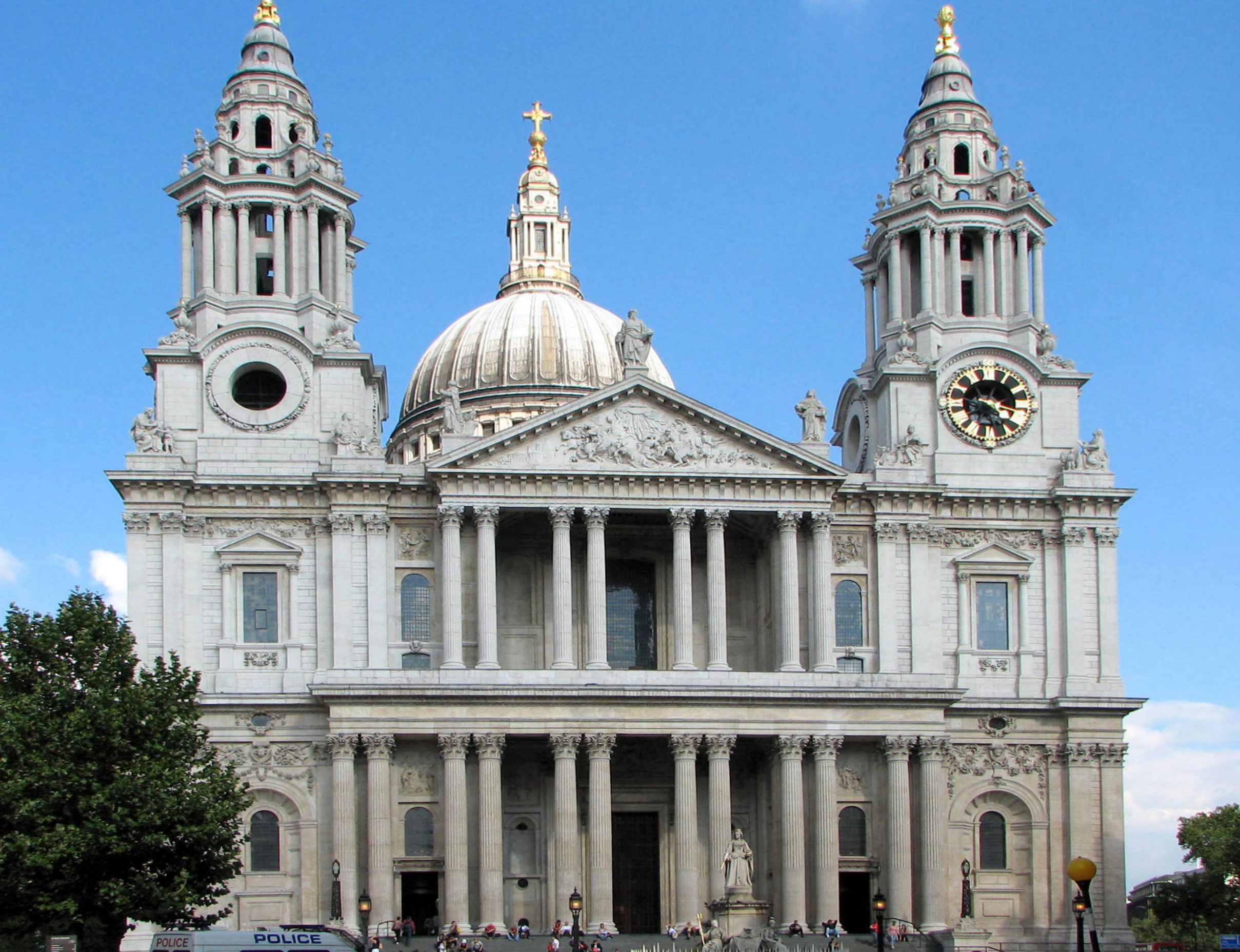
Saint Paul's, London

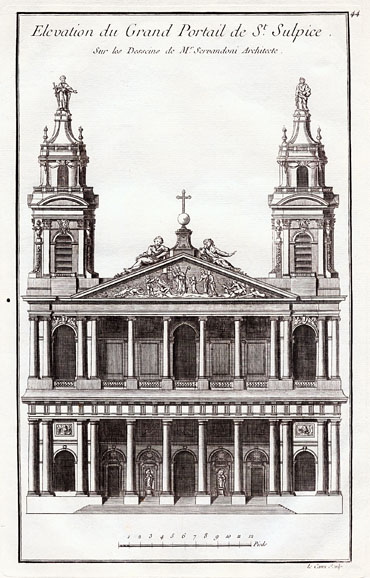
Servandoni's design

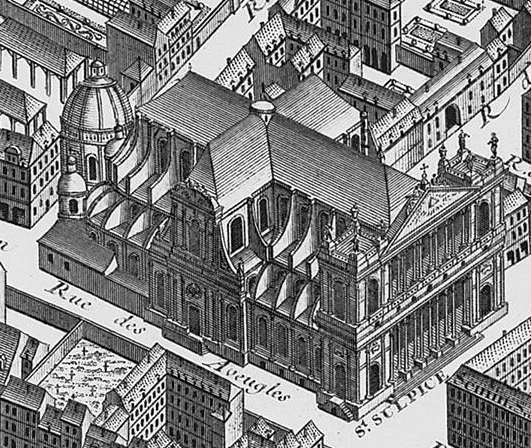
On the 1739 Turgot map

Unfinished at the time of his death in 1766, the work was continued by others, primarily the obscure Oudot de Maclaurin, who erected twin towers to Servandoni's design. Servandoni's pupil Jean-François Chalgrin rebuilt the north tower (1777–1780), making it taller and modifying Servandoni's baroque design to one that was more neoclassical, but the French Revolution intervened, and the south tower was never replaced. Chalgrin also designed the decoration of the chapels under the towers.

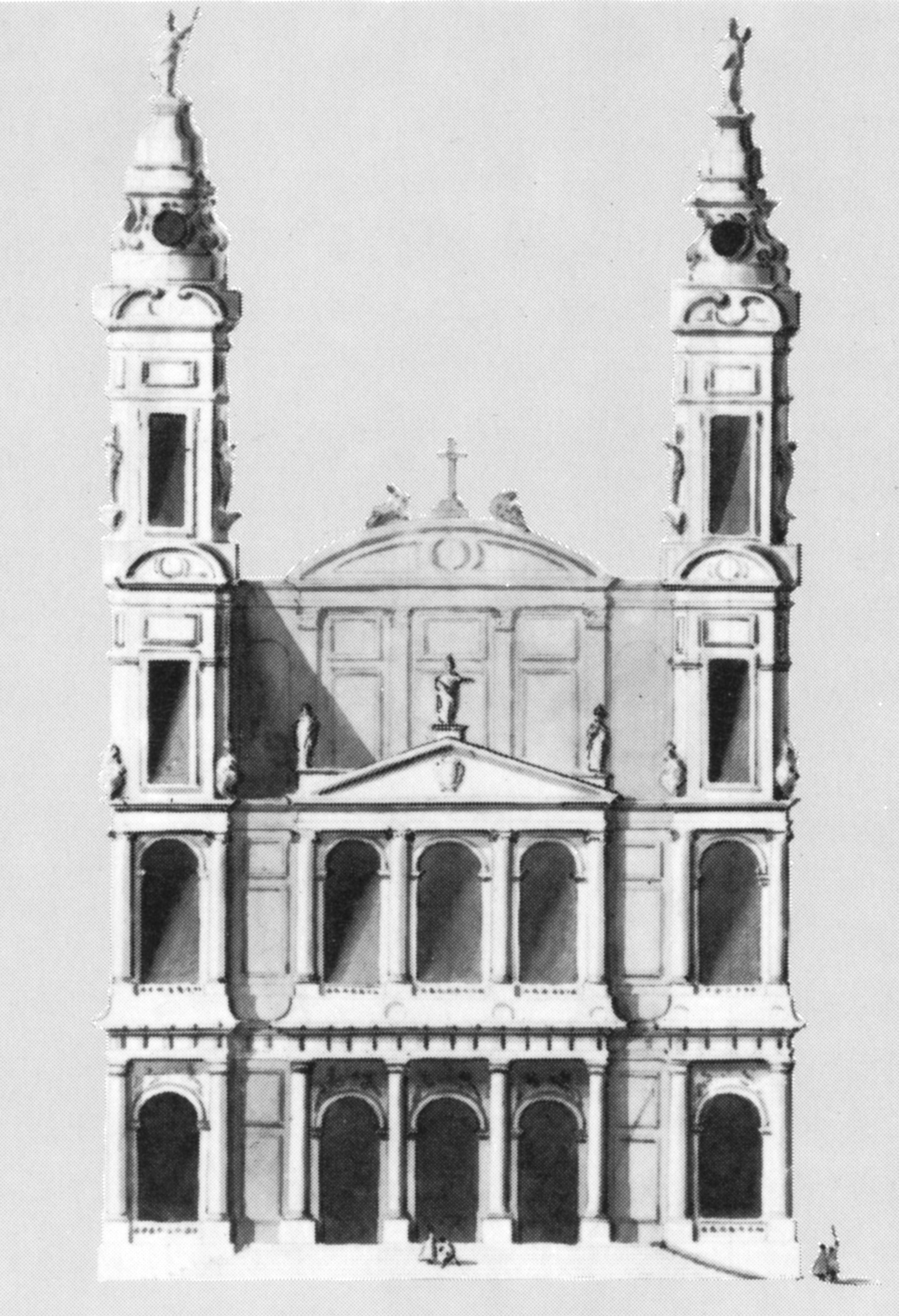
Design with a third order by Servandoni (1752)

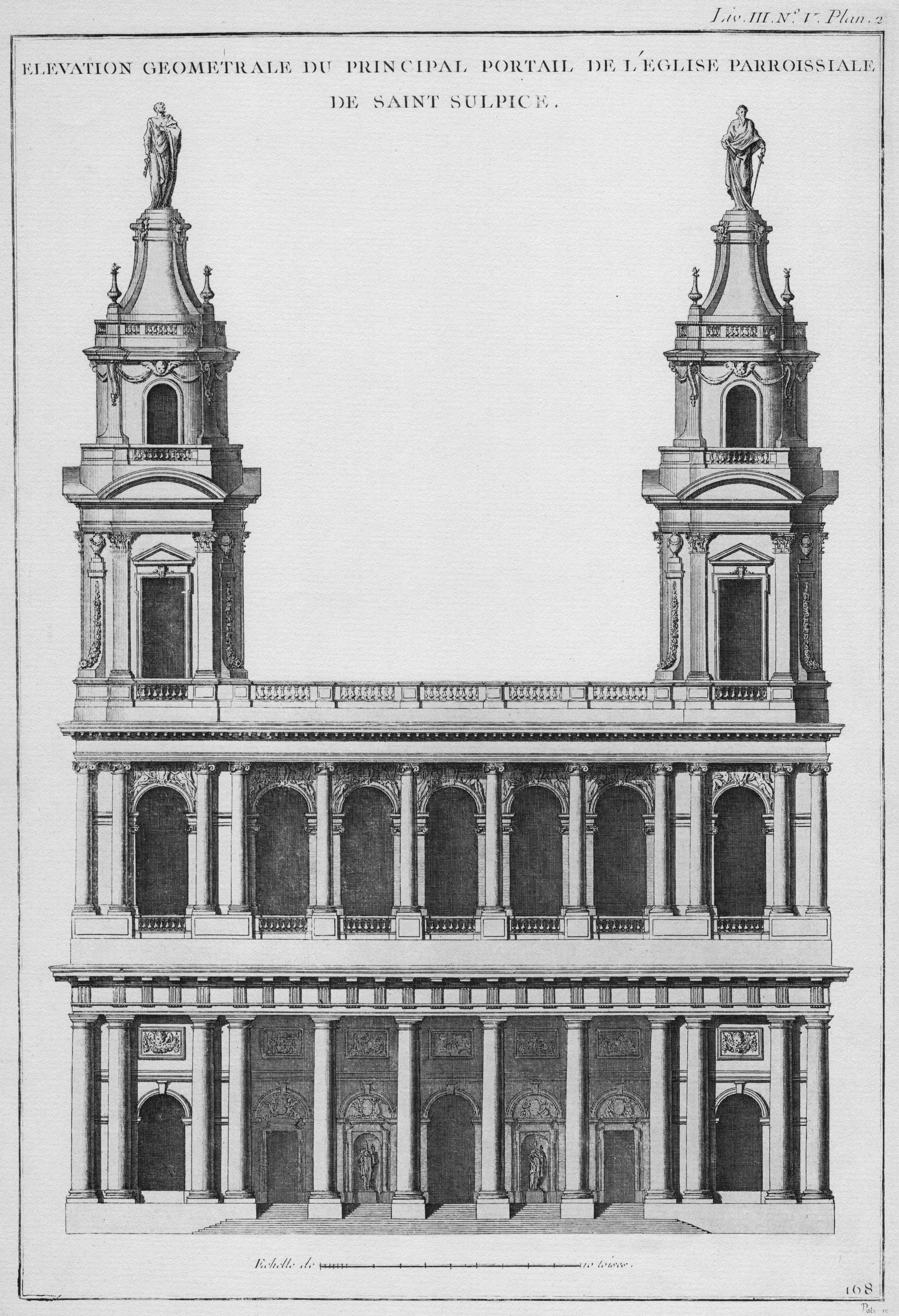
Design from Blondel (1752)

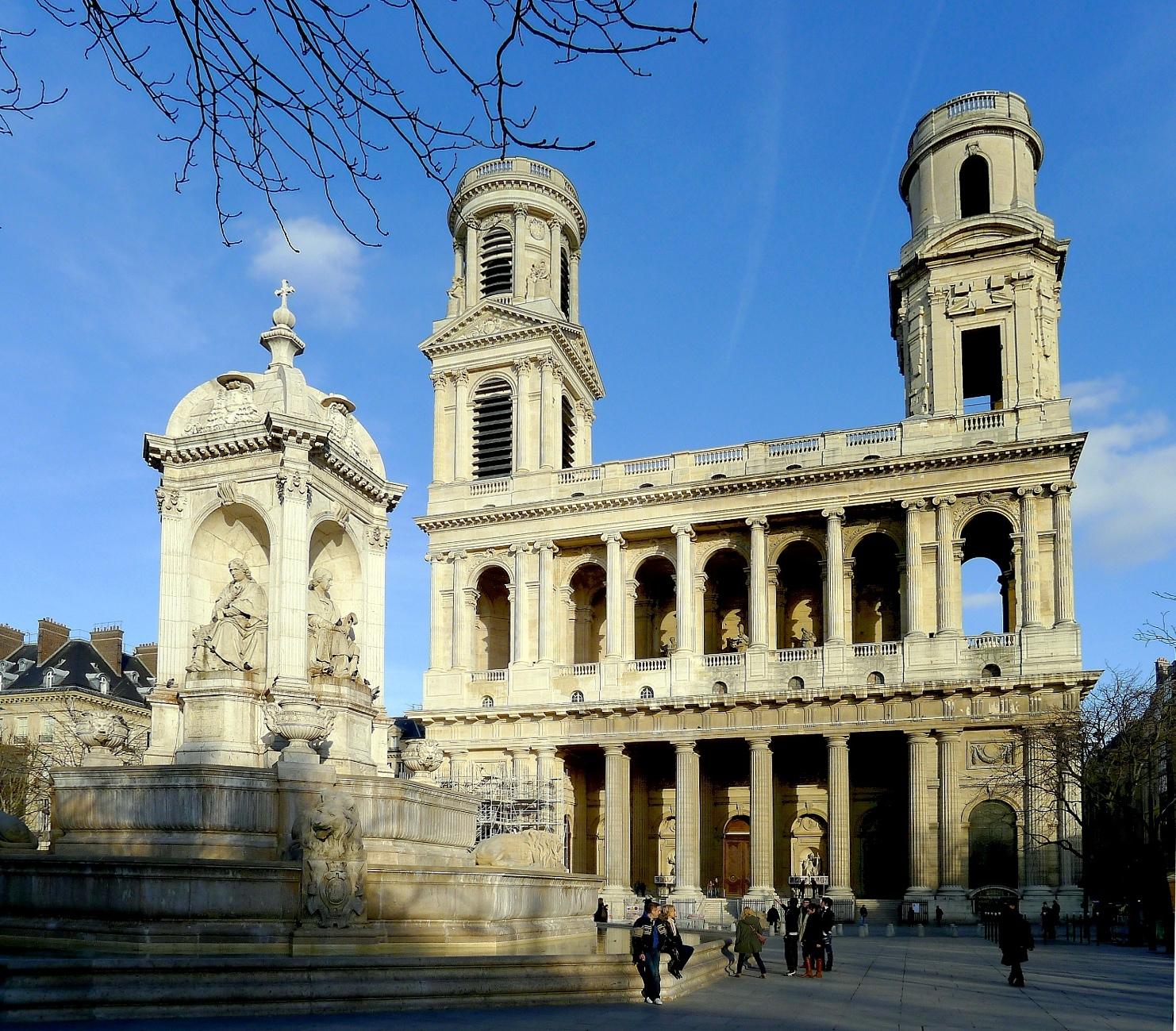
The current façade with mis-matched towers (2010)

The principal façade now exists in somewhat altered form. Servandoni's pediment, criticized as classically incorrect because its width was based on the entire front rather than the size of the order on which it rested, was removed after it was struck by lightning in 1770 and replaced with a balustrade. This change and the absence of the belvederes on the towers bring the design closer in spirit to that of the severely classical east front of the Louvre. A double colonnade, Ionic order over Roman Doric with loggias behind them, unifies the bases of the corner towers with the façade; this fully classicising statement was made at the height of the rococo.

Its revolutionary character was recognised by the architect and teacher Jacques-François Blondel, who illustrated the elevation of the façade in his Architecture françoise of 1752, remarking: "The entire merit of this building lies in the architecture itself... and its greatness of scale, which opens a practically new road for our French architects." Large arched windows fill the vast interior with natural light. The result is a simple two-storey west front with three tiers of elegant columns. The overall harmony of the building is, some say, only marred by the two mismatched towers. The Neoclassical façade of Saint-Sulpice, with its double colonnade and restrained ornamentation, established a model for Parisian church architecture in the 18th century.

Another point of interest dating from the time of the Revolution, when Christianity was suppressed and Saint-Sulpice became a place of worship for the Robespierrean Cult of the Supreme Being, is a printed sign over the center door of the main entrance. One can still barely make out the printed words Le Peuple Français Reconnoit L'Etre Suprême Et L'Immortalité de L'Âme ("The French people recognize the Supreme Being and the immortality of the soul").

=== Interior ===
The interior of the church

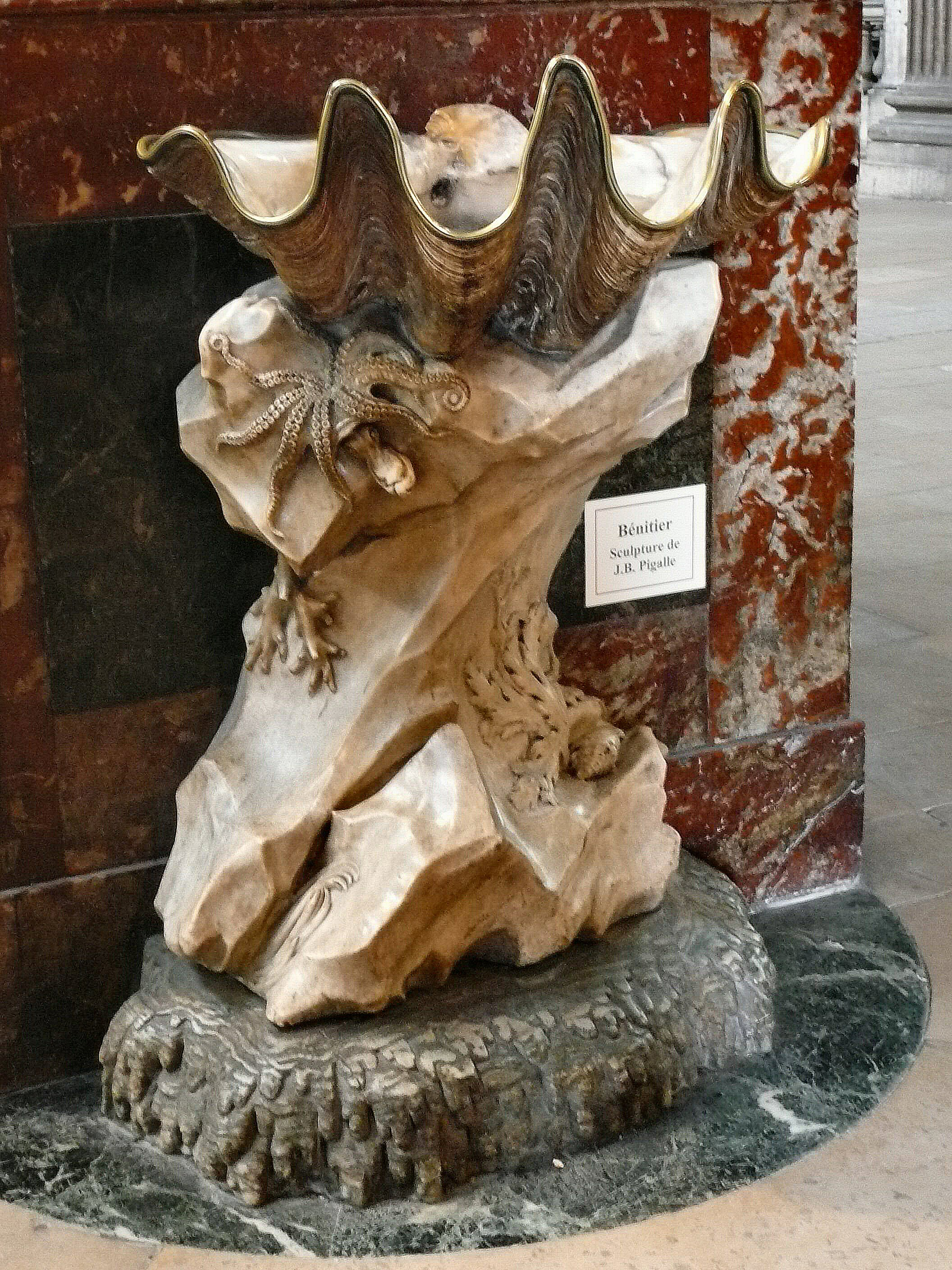
Holy water font

Inside the church to either side of the entrance are the two halves of an enormous shell (Tridacna gigas) given to King Francis I by the Venetian Republic. They function as holy water fonts and rest on rock-like bases sculpted by Jean-Baptiste Pigalle.

Pigalle also designed the large white marble statue of Mary in the Lady Chapel at the far end of the church. The stucco decoration surrounding it is by Louis-Philippe Mouchy. Pigalle's work replaced a solid-silver statue by Edmé Bouchardon, which vanished at the time of the Revolution. It was cast from silverware donated by parishioners and was known as "Our Lady of the Old Tableware".

The baroque interior of the Lady Chapel (rebuilt by Servandoni in 1729) was designed by Charles de Wailly in 1774, after the chapel was badly damaged by a fire which destroyed the nearby Foire Saint-Germain in 1762. The dome, lit by natural light from hidden windows devised by de Wailly, contains a fresco by François Lemoyne depicting the Assumption of Mary, which dates from 1734, although it has been restored several times since then. De Wailly also designed the pulpit (in the nave), completed in 1788. The oak canopy broadcasts sound very well and it was from here that the parish priest of Saint-Sulpice declared his refusal to accept the Civil Constitution of the Clergy. Revolutionary orators used it later also. One of its permanent exhibits is MARIA by Guido Dettoni della Grazia.

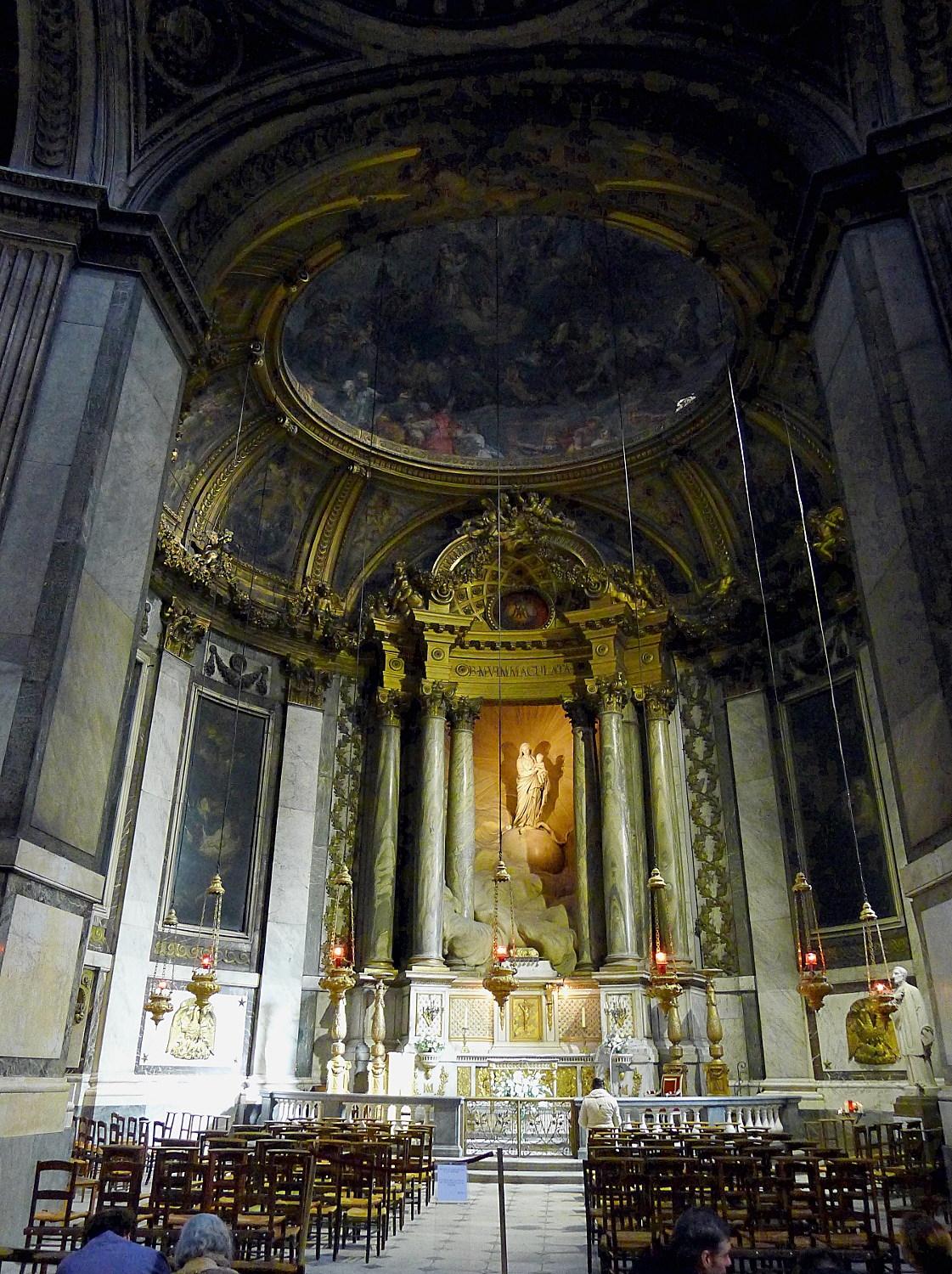
Lady Chapel

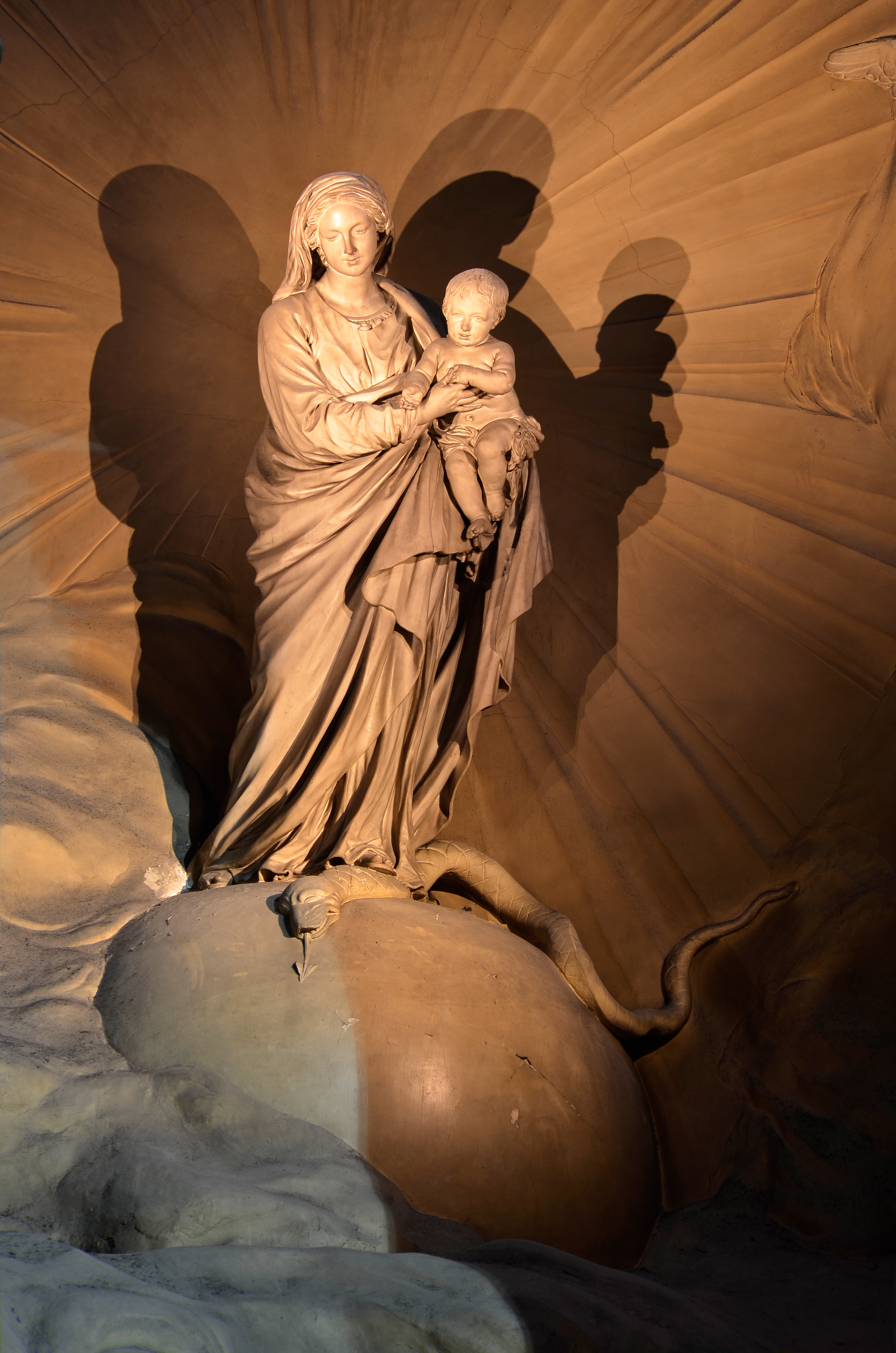
Statue of Mary

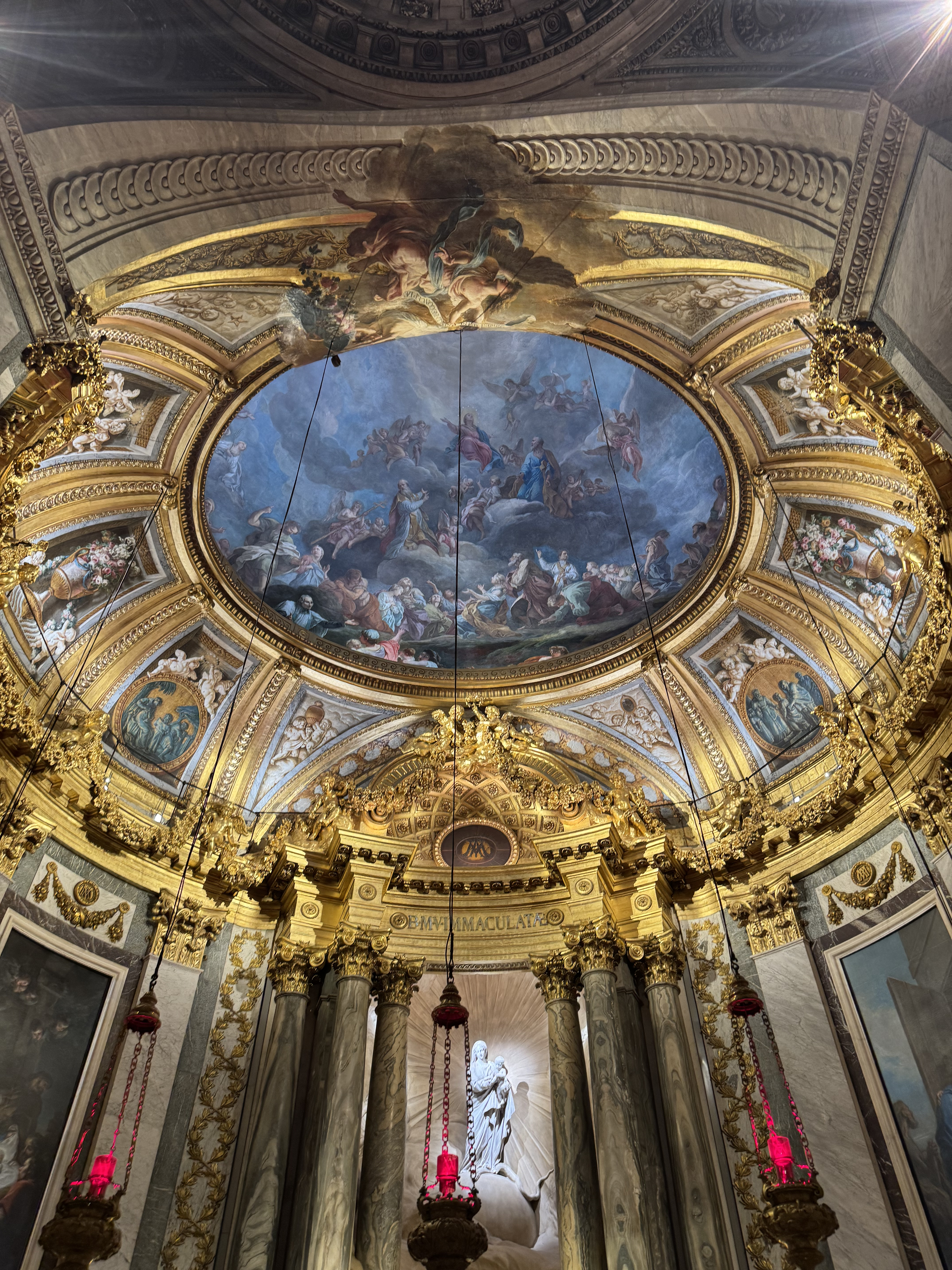
Dome of the Lady Chapel with François Lemoyne's fresco of The Assumption of the Virgin (1730-1732)

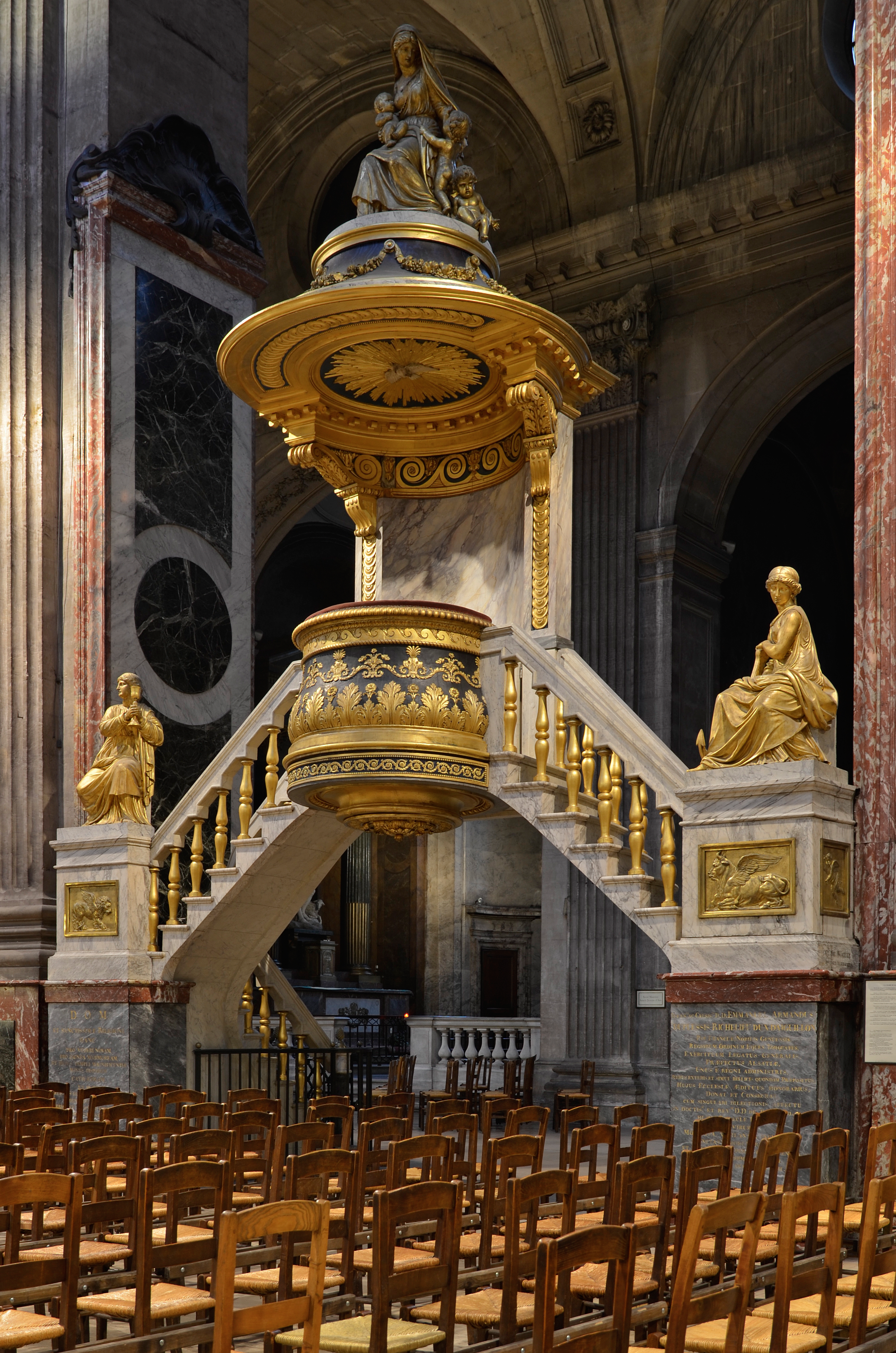
Pulpit

During the Directory, Saint-Sulpice was used as a Temple of Victory. Redecorations to the interior, to repair extensive damage still remaining from the Revolution, were begun after the Concordat of 1801. Eugène Delacroix added murals (1855–1861) that adorn the walls of the Chapel of the Holy Angels (first side-chapel on the right). The most famous of these are Jacob Wrestling with the Angel and Heliodorus Driven from the Temple. A third, on the ceiling, is Saint Michael Vanquishing the Demon.

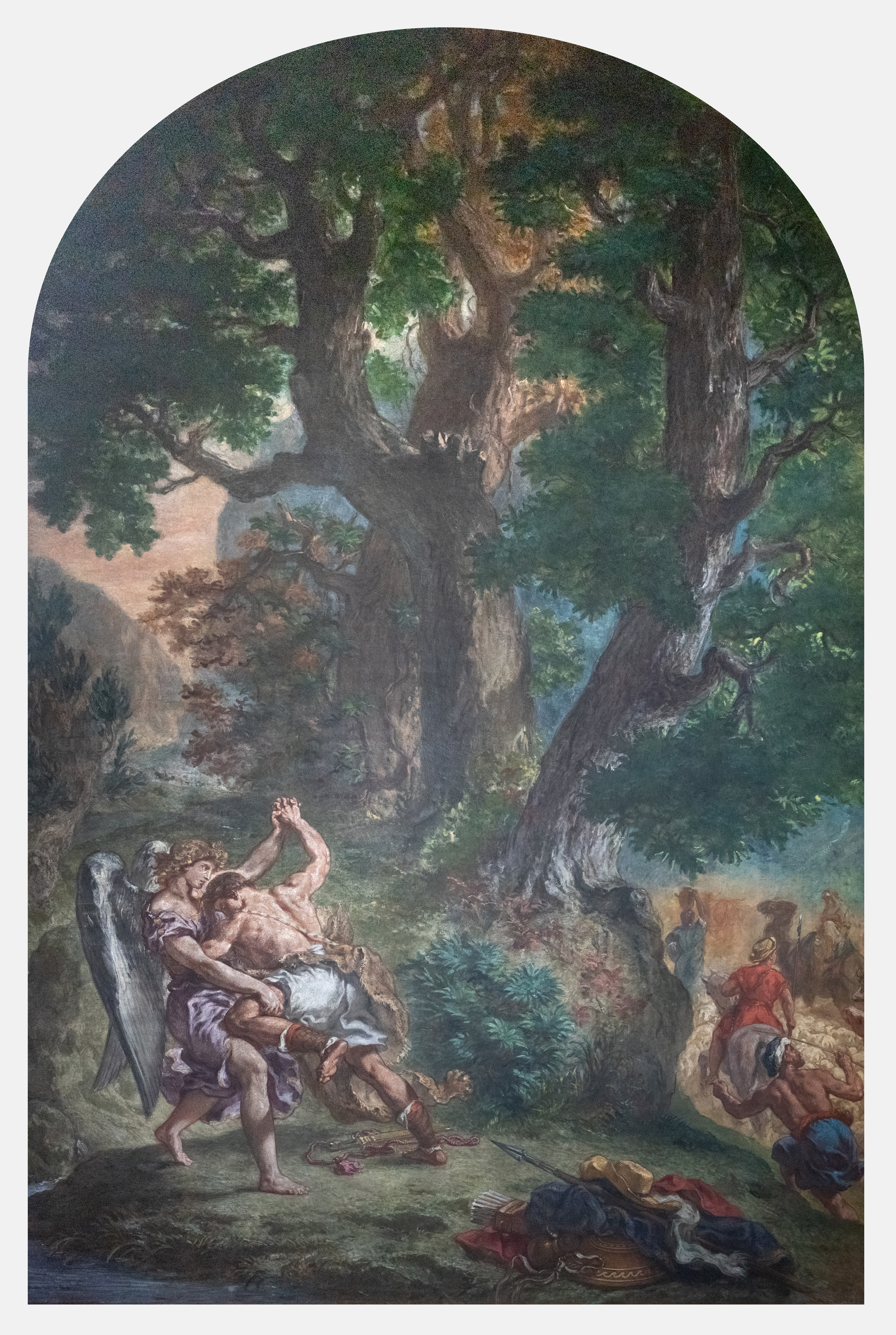
Jacob Wrestling with the Angel

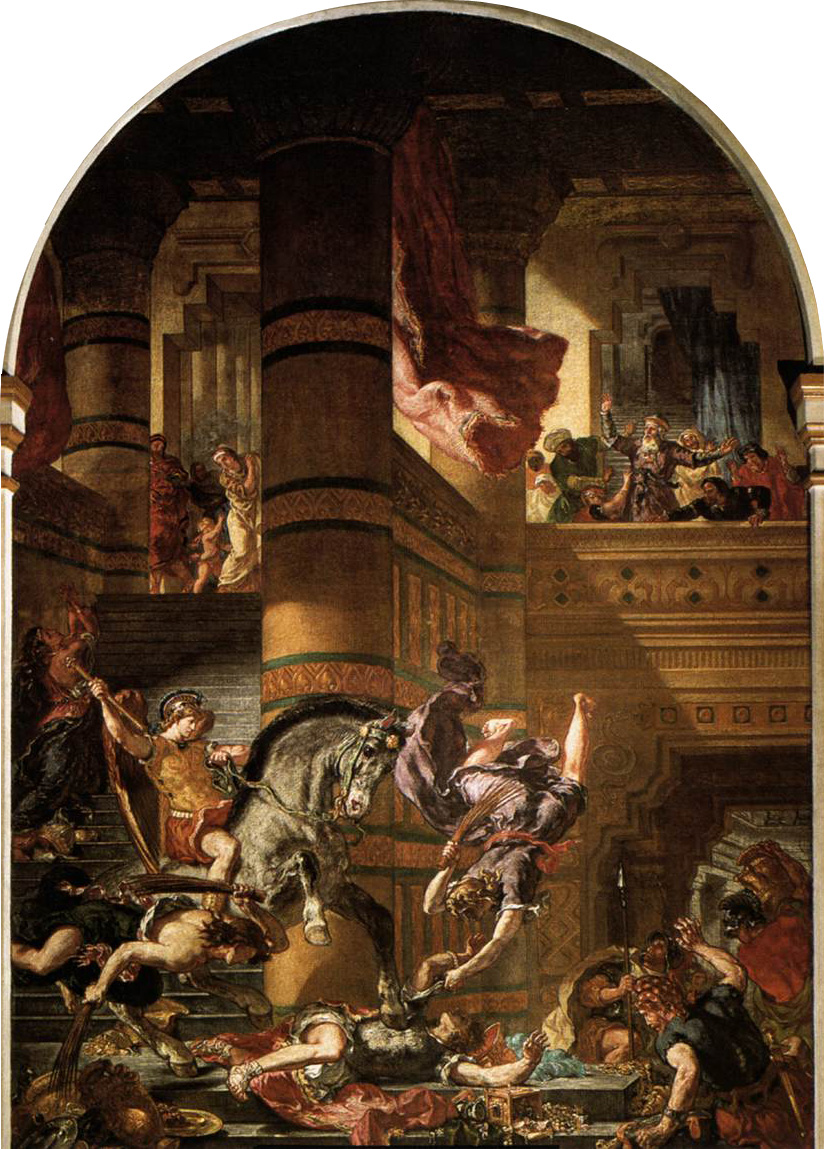
Heliodorus Driven from the Temple

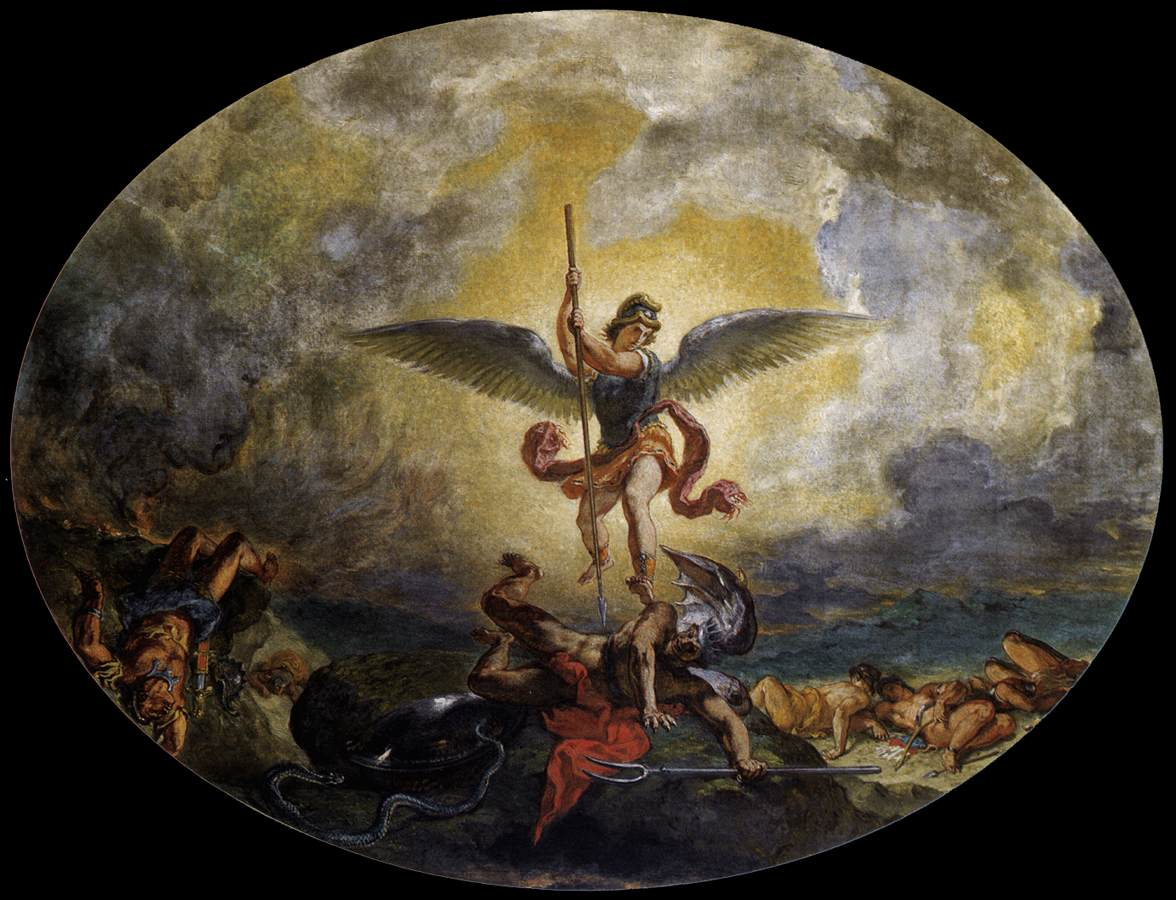
Saint Michael Vanquishing the Demon

=== Notable events ===
The Marquis de Sade and Charles Baudelaire were baptized in Saint-Sulpice (1740 and 1821, respectively), and the church also saw the marriage of Victor Hugo to Adèle Foucher (1822).

On 6 June 1791, Pierre Victor, Baron de Besenval de Brunstatt, was buried in the church of Saint-Sulpice, after having died on 2 June in his residence, the Hôtel de Besenval.

During the Paris Commune (1871) one faction, called the Club de la Victoire, chose Saint-Sulpice as its headquarters and Louise Michel spoke from the pulpit.

Louise Élisabeth de Bourbon and Louise Élisabeth d'Orléans, granddaughters of Louis XIV and Madame de Montespan are buried in the church. Louise de Lorraine, Duchess of Bouillon and wife of Charles Godefroy de La Tour d'Auvergne, was buried here in 1788.

On Sunday 17 March 2019, the church caught on fire. Spectators at an organ concert alerted firefighters. The fire badly damaged the doors, a stained-glass window, and a bas-relief; and a staircase near the doorway went up in flames. Police later confirmed the fire was an arson attack. The City of Paris is required to pay for the building's repair and restoration.

A funeral mass was held in the church for Jacques Chirac, former President of France, on 30 September 2019.

== Organs ==
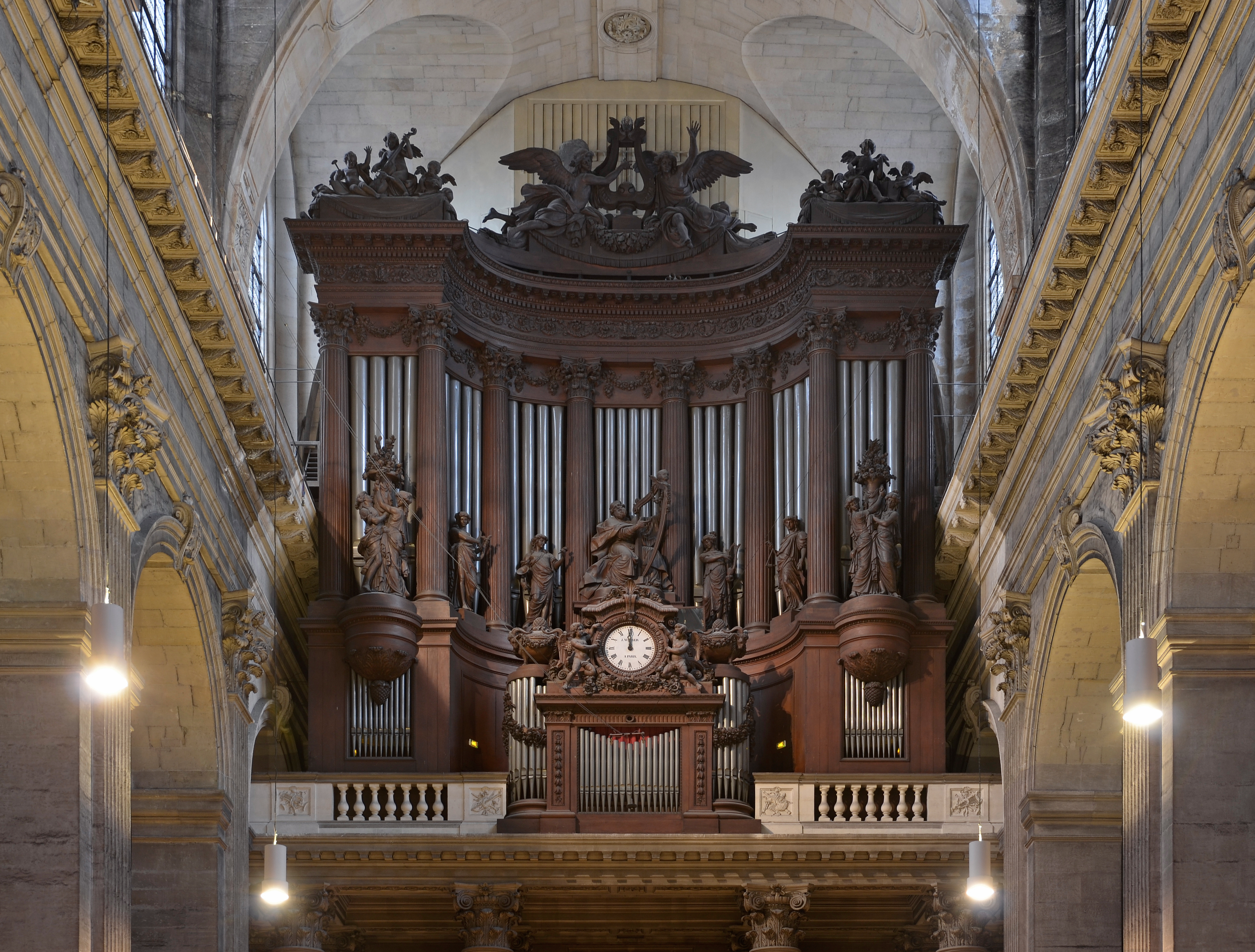
The Great Organ reconstructed by Aristide Cavaillé-Coll in 1862

The church has a long-standing tradition of talented organists that dates back to the eighteenth century (see below). In 1862, Aristide Cavaillé-Coll rebuilt the existing organ built by François-Henri Clicquot. The case was designed by Jean-François Chalgrin and built by Monsieur Joudot.

Though using many materials from Clicquot's French Classical organ, it is considered to be Cavaillé-Coll's magnum opus, featuring 102 speaking stops on five manuals and pedal, and is perhaps the most impressive instrument of the romantic French symphonic-organ era.

Its titular organists have been renowned, starting with Nicolas Séjan in the 18th century, and continuing with Charles-Marie Widor (organist 1870–1933), Marcel Dupré (organist 1934–1971), and Jean-Jacques Grunenwald (organist 1973–1982), organists and composers of high international reputation. For over a century (1870–1971), Saint-Sulpice employed only two organists, and much credit is due to these musicians for preserving the instrument in its original state. Since 2023 Sophie-Véronique Cauchefer-Choplin and Karol Mossakowski have served as titular organists, having succeeded Daniel Roth (titular organist from 1985 to 2023), who continues to serve as emeritus titular organist.

Aside from a re-arrangement of the manuals and replacement of a few stops in 1903 by Charles Mutin (Cavaillé-Coll's direct successor), the installation of an electric blower in the 1920s, and the addition of two Pedal stops upon Widor's retirement in 1933 (Principal 16' and Principal 8', donated by the Société Cavaille-Coll), the organ is maintained today almost exactly as Cavaillé-Coll originally completed it in 1862.

In Saint-Sulpice, Sunday organ concerts are held on a regular basis at 10:00 am ("Auditions des Grandes Orgues à Saint Sulpice", preceding the 11:00 am Mass). The Sunday Mass is preceded by a 15-minute Prelude of the Great Organ, starting at 10:45 am.

The church is also home to a two-manual-and-pedal choir organ by Aristide Cavaillé-Coll from 1858.

Great organ specification
| Pédale 30 notes | Grand-Chœur 56 notes | Grand-Orgue 56 notes | Positif 56 notes | Récit expressif 56 notes | Solo 56 notes |
|---|---|---|---|---|---|
| Jeux de fond: Principal 32; Principal 16; Contrebasse 16; Soubasse 16; Principal 8; Violoncelle 8; Flûte 8; Flûte 4; Jeux d'combinaison: Bombarde 32; Bombarde 16; Basson 16; Trompette 8; Ophicléide 8; Clairon 4 | Salicional 8; Octave 4; Fourniture IV; Plein Jeu IV; Cymbale VI; Cornet V; Bombarde 16; Basson 16; 1'ére Trompette 8; 2'éme Trompette 8; Basson 8; Clairon 4; Clairon-doublette 2 | Principal harmonique 16; Montre 16; Bourdon 16; Flûte conique 16; Montre 8; Diapason 8; Bourdon 8; Flûte harmonique 8; Flûte traversière 8; Flûte á pavillon 8; Quinte 5 1/3; Prestant 4; Doublette 2 | Jeux de fond: Violonbasse 16; Quintaton 16; Salicional 8; Viole de Gambe 8; Unda maris 8; Quintaton 8; Flûte traversière 8; Flûte douce 4; Flûte octaviante 4; Dulciane 4; Jeux d'combinaison: Doublette 2; Quinte 2 2/3; Tierce 1 3/5; Larigot 1 1/3; Picolo 1; Plein-jeu harmonique III-VI; Basson 16; Baryton 8; Trompette 8; Clairon 4 | Jeux de fond: Quintaton 16; Diapason 8; Bourdon 8; Violoncelle 8; Voix céleste 8; Prestant 4; Doublette 2; Fourniture IV; Cymbale V; Basson-hautbois 8; Cromorne 8; Voix humaine 8; Jeux d´combinaison: Flûte harmonique 8; Flûte octaviante 4; Dulciane 4; Nazard 2 2/3; Octavin 2; Cornet V; Bombarde 16; Trompette 8; Clairon 4 | Jeux de fond: Bourdon 16; Flûte harmonique 8; Violoncelle 8; Gambe 8; Kéraulophone 8; Prestant 4; Flûte octaviante 4; Jeux d'combinaison: Octave 4; Octavin 2; Quinte 5 1/3; Tierce 3 1/5; Septième 2 2/7; Quinte 2 2/3; Cornet V; Bombarde 16; Trompette 8; Clairon 4; Trompette coudée à forte pression 8 |

Accessories:

- Machine à grêle
- Rossignol

Couplers:

- Grand-Chœur/Ped, Grand-Orgue/Ped, Récit/Ped
- Keyboards: I/II, II/I, III/I, IV/I, V/I, IV/III
- I/I, II/I, III/III, IV/IV, V/V

Wind pressures (mm)

- Grand-orgue : 95, 100
- Grand-chœur : 95, 115
- Solo : 100, 115, 127
- Positif : 100, 115, 120
- Récit : 100, 115
- Pedal : 90 – 100
- Trompette coudée : 140 – 150

Choir organ specification
| Pédale 30 notes | Grand-Orgue 54 notes | Récit expressif 54 notes |
|---|---|---|
| Soubasse 16; Bourdon 16 (G.O) | Bourdon 16; Bourdon 8; Montre 8; Salicional 8; Flûte harmonique 8; Prestant 4; Octave 4; Quinte 2 2/3; Doublette 2; Plein-jeu IV; Basson 16; Trompette 8; Clairon 4 | Flûte traversière 8; Viole de Gambe 8; Voix céleste 8; Flûte octaviante 4; Octavin 2; Cor anglais 8; Trompette harmonique 8; Clairon 4 |

Couplers: II/I, I/P, II/P. Trémolo (Récit), reeds G.O., reeds Récit

=== List of organists ===
The dates indicate when the organist was titulaire.

- Nicolas Pescheur (died 1601 or 1614)
- Vincent Coppeau (c. 1618 – c. 1651)
- Guillaume-Gabriel Nivers (c. 1651–1702)
- Louis-Nicolas Clérambault (1715–1749)
- César-François Clérambault (1749–1760)
- Evrard-Dominique Clérambault (1761–1773)
- Claude-Étienne Luce (1773–1783)
- Nicolas Séjan (1783–1819)
- Louis-Nicolas Séjan (1819–1849)
- Georg Schmitt (1850–1863)
- Alfred Lefébure-Wély (1863–1869)
- Charles-Marie Widor (1870–1934)
- Marcel Dupré (1934–1971)
- Jean-Jacques Grunenwald (1973–1982)
- Daniel Roth (1985–2023), emeritus titular organist since 2023
- Sophie-Véronique Cauchefer-Choplin (2023−present), titular organist
- Karol Mossakowski (2023−present), titular organist

== Gnomon ==
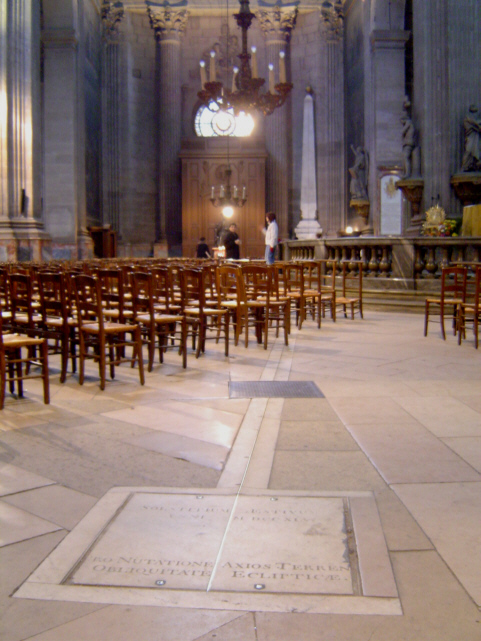
The gnomon (in the background) and the brass line on the floor

In 1727, Jean-Baptiste Languet de Gergy, then priest of Saint-Sulpice, requested the construction of a gnomon in the church as part of its new construction, to help him determine the time of the equinoxes and hence of Easter. A meridian line of brass was inlaid across the floor and ascending a white marble obelisk, nearly eleven metres high, at the top of which is a sphere surmounted by a cross. The obelisk is dated 1743.

In the south transept window a small opening with a lens was set up, so that a ray of sunlight shines onto the brass line. At noon on the winter solstice (21 December), the ray of light touches the brass line on the obelisk. At noon on the equinoxes (21 March and 21 September), the ray touches an oval plate of copper in the floor near the altar.

Constructed by the English clock-maker and astronomer Henry Sully, the gnomon was also used for various scientific measurements. This rational use may have protected Saint-Sulpice from being destroyed during the French Revolution.

== Cultural allusions ==
Act III, scene ii of Jules Massenet's opera Manon takes place in Saint-Sulpice, where Manon convinces des Grieux to run away with her once more.

In Splendeurs et misères des courtisanes by Honoré de Balzac, Abbé Herrera celebrates Mass in the church and lives nearby in the rue Cassette. The plot of Balzac's short story La Messe de l'athée also centers around Saint-Suplice.

The fashionable public side of Saint-Sulpice inspired Joris-Karl Huysmans to set the action there in his 1891 novel Là-Bas, dealing with Satanism in which the ritual magician "Eliphas Levi" attended the seminary attached to the church. St. Sulpice is also a primary setting in Huysmans' next novel, En Route, his first novel that depicts his life and thoughts following his full embrace of Catholicism 1895.

A major part of Djuna Barnes's 1936 novel Nightwood takes place around Saint-Sulpice, especially in the Café de la Mairie.

References to the church of Saint-Sulpice are found in the so-called Dossiers Secrets d'Henri Lobineau, which was deposited in the Bibliothèque Nationale in the 1960s.

In Lynn Picknett and Clive Prince's The Templar Revelation (1997), Saint-Sulpice is noted.

Dan Brown's 2003 novel The Da Vinci Code was an international bestseller that brought crowds of tourists to Saint-Sulpice. This note has been on display in the church:

Contrary to fanciful allegations in a recent best-selling novel, this [the line in the floor] is not a vestige of a pagan temple. No such temple ever existed in this place. It was never called a «Rose-Line». It does not coincide with the meridian traced through the middle of the Paris Observatory which serves as a reference for maps where longitudes are measured in degrees East or West of Paris.... Please also note that the letters «P» and «S» in the small round windows at both ends of the transept refer to Peter and Sulpice, the patron saints of the church, not an imaginary «Priory of Sion».

In 2005, the Archdiocese of Paris refused Ron Howard permission to film inside Saint-Sulpice when he was making The Da Vinci Code.

== Image gallery ==
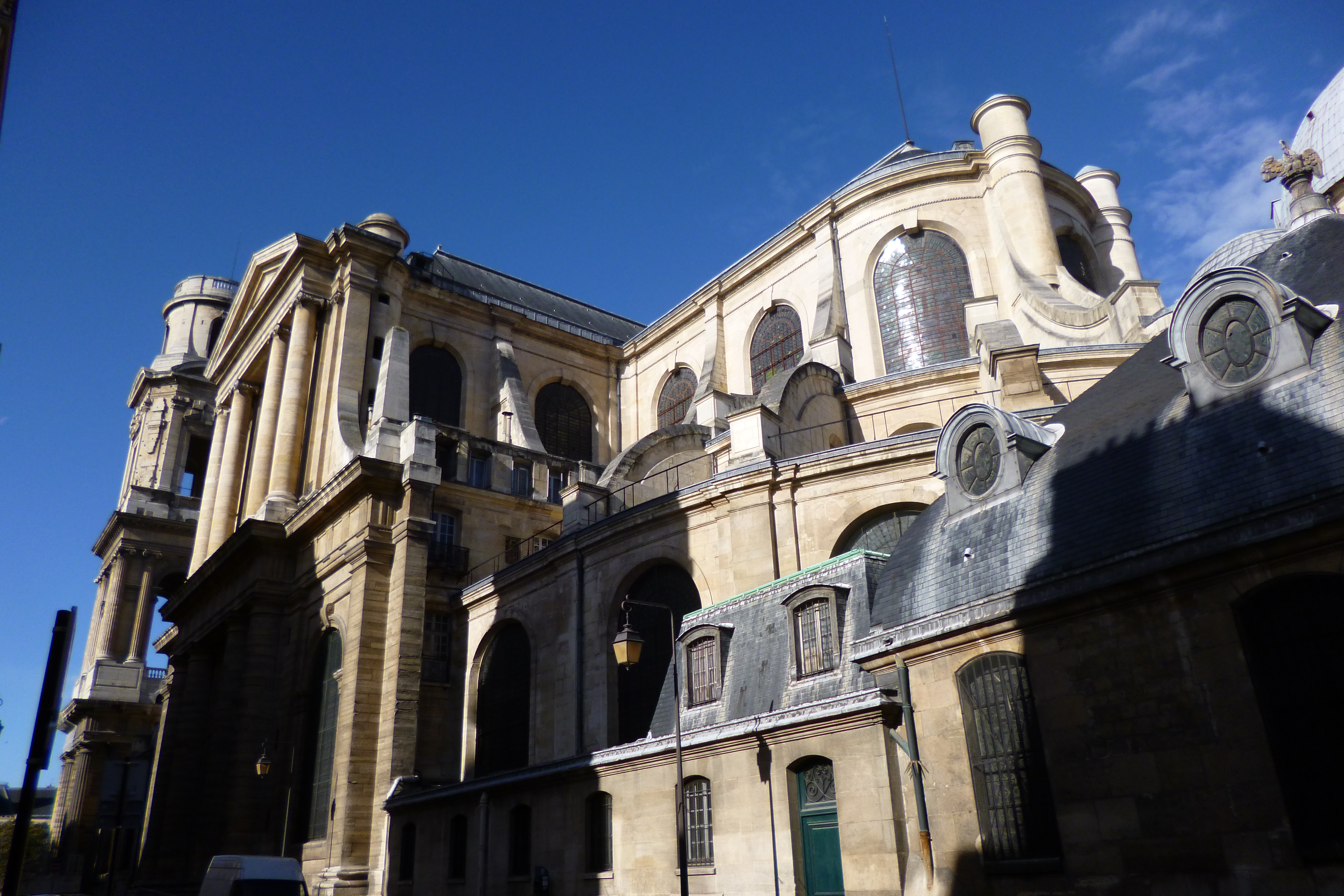
South side of Saint-Sulpice

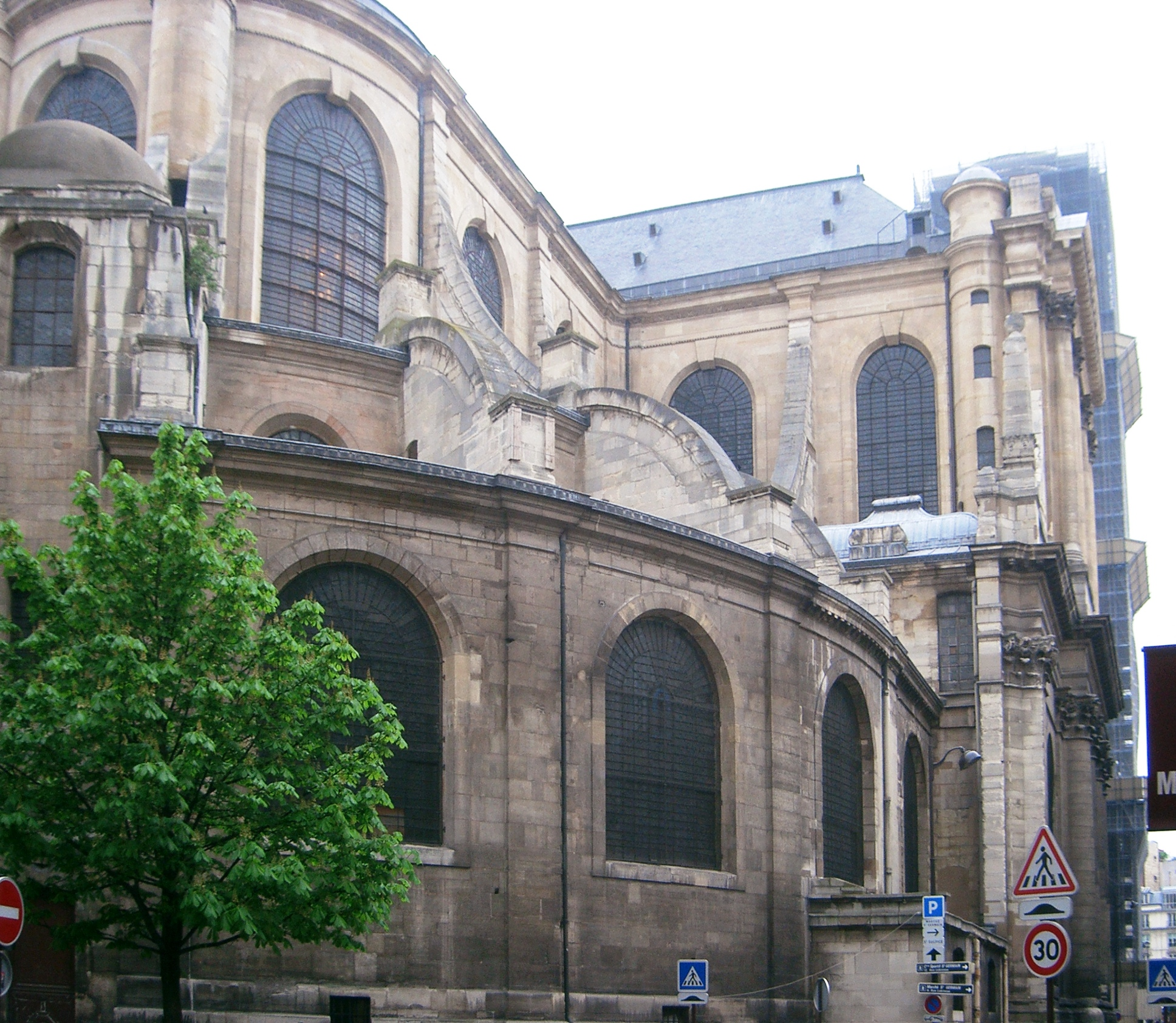
Choir from the northeast

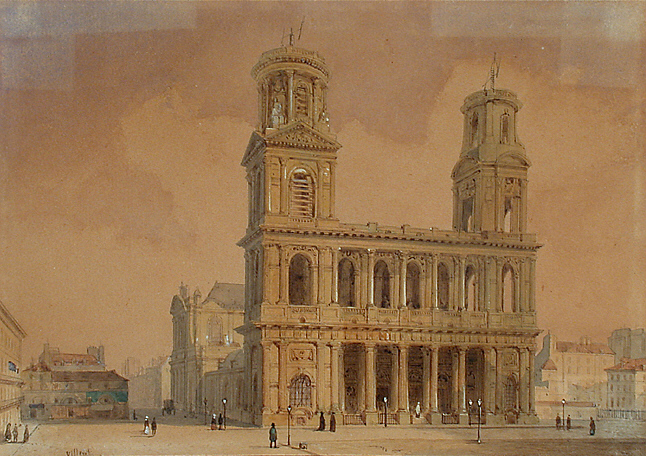
Saint-Sulpice, watercolor by François-Étienne Villeret

== See also ==
- Category:Burials at Saint-Sulpice, Paris
- Saint-Sulpice Seminary (Issy-les-Moulineaux)
- List of historic churches in Paris
- Rue Saint-Sulpice (Paris)

== Bibliography ==
- Ayers, Andrew (2004). The Architecture of Paris. Stuttgart: Axel Menges. ISBN 9783930698967.
- Himmelfarb, Hélène (1996). "Gittard, Daniel", vol. 12, p. 747, in The Dictionary of Art (34 volumes), edited by Jane Turner. New York: Grove. ISBN 9781884446009. See also at Oxford Art Online (subscription required).
- Kauffmann, Jean-Paul (2002). Wrestling with the Angel: The Mystery of Delacroix's Mural. London: Harvill. ISBN 9781843430179. Also titled The Angel of the Left Bank: The Secrets of Delacroix's Parisian Masterpiece and The Struggle with the Angel: Delacroix, Jacob, and the God of Good and Evil.
- Terrien, Laurence, translator (2004). Saint-Sulpice. Paris: Paroisse Saint-Sulpice. OCLC 915105541.
