= Omnia mea mecum porto =

Latin quote

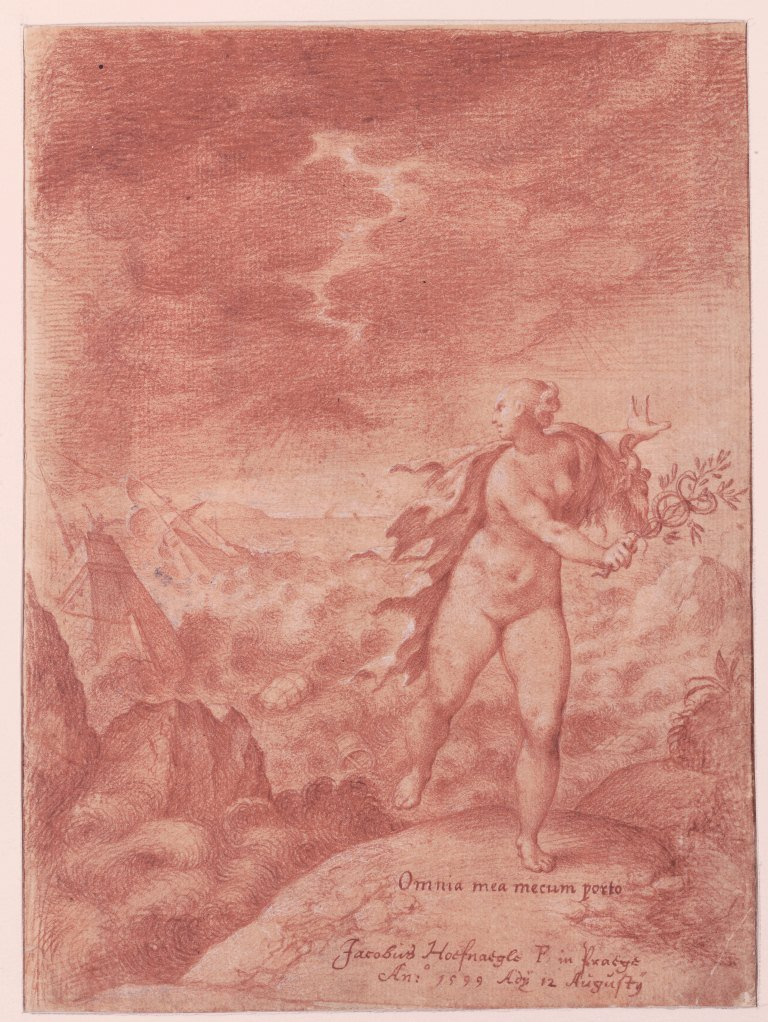
"Allegory of the Humanist Virtue" by Jacob Hoefnagel, 1599

Omnia mea mecum porto (Latin: "All that is mine I carry with me") is a quote that Cicero ascribes to Bias of Priene. Bias of Priene, one of the Seven Sages of Greece, is said to make the statement during the flight from his hometown, with the apparent meaning that his possessions are those of character traits and wisdom (as opposed to material things).

Later, in a letter to Lucilius and the treatise De constantia, Seneca the Younger attributed the variant Omnia mea mecum sunt (Latin: "All that is mine is with me") to Stilpo after the destruction of Megara by Demetrius I of Macedon.

== See also ==
- List of Latin phrases
- Vade mecum – Type of reference book
