= Karol Mossakowski =

Polish organist and composer

Karol Mossakowski is a Polish organist and has been co-titular organist of the Church of Saint-Sulpice in Paris since 2023. He won a Grand Prix de Chartes award in 2016 and a ICMA award in 2023. He won a first prize at the Prague Spring International Music Festival.

Mossakowski began learning the organ by the age of 3 and has played at the Cathedral of St. Louis King of France.
