= Characters in As You Like It =

List of characters in As You Like It

The following is a list of characters in William Shakespeare's As You Like It.

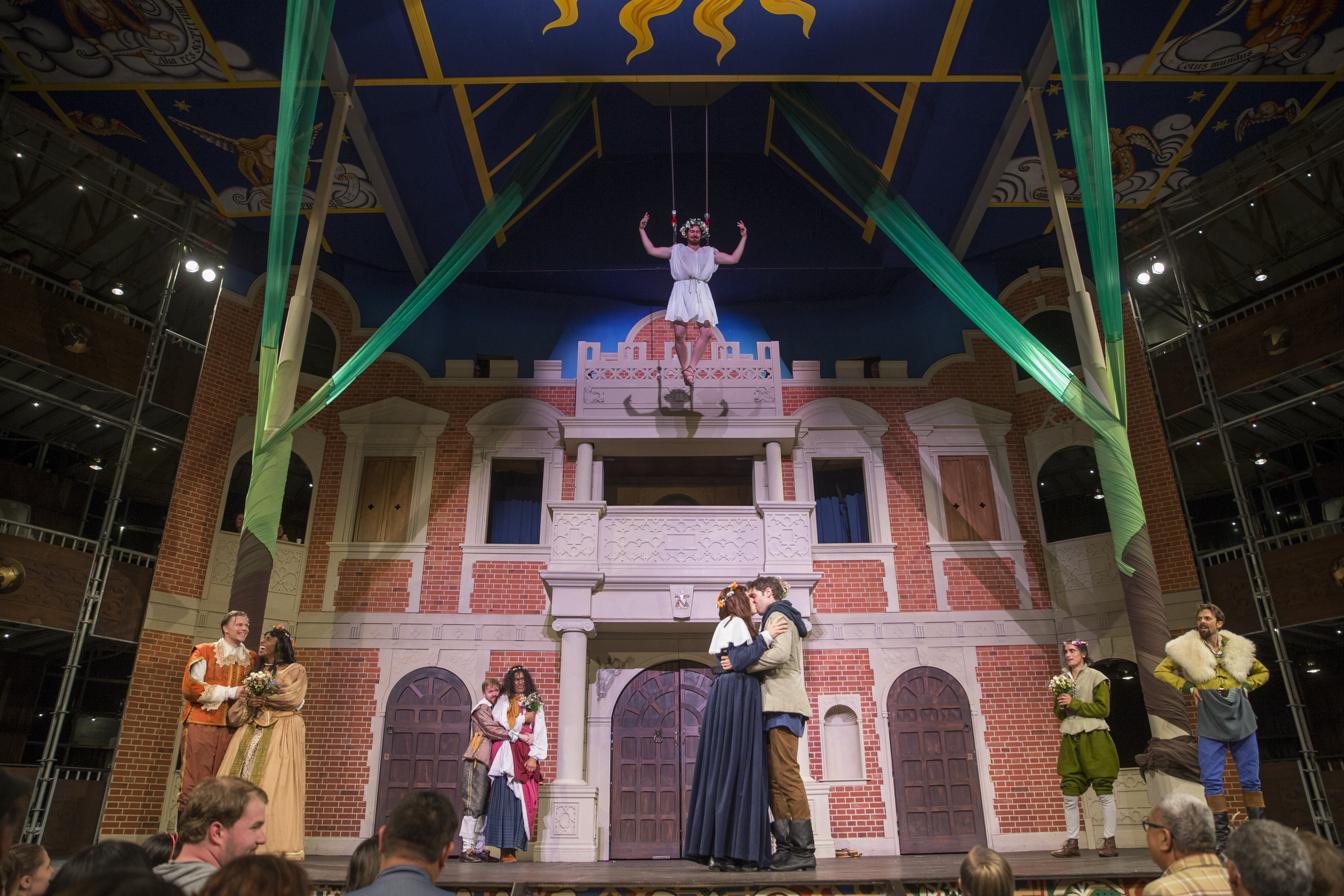
As You Like It, closing scene: the eight characters who marry with the god Hymen restoring harmony before they are commanded to dance. (Performance in Pop Up Globe, 2017)

== The Court of Duke Frederick ==
=== Duke Frederick ===
Duke Frederick is the younger brother of Duke Senior and the father of Celia. Prior to the play he usurps power from his older brother. His hatred and paranoia are displayed when he banishes Rosalind, the daughter of Duke Senior. However, at the end of the play, as Duke Frederick brings his army towards the forest to kill his brother, he happens upon an old priest who convinces him to take up the monastic life of peace and simplicity.

=== Celia ===
Celia is the daughter of Duke Frederick. She has been portrayed as a foil to her cousin, Rosalind. She displays qualities of the head and heart similar to her cousin. Rosalind and Celia are intimate friends who have been bred and brought up together. It is the love for Rosalind that makes Celia choose a life of voluntary exile.

=== Touchstone ===
Touchstone is a jester in Duke Frederick's court. He is used throughout the play to both provide comic relief through sometimes vulgar humor and contrarily share wisdom, fitting the archetype of the Shakespearean fool. Oftentimes, he acts as a character who foils his surroundings, observing and mocking the events and characters of the play.

=== Le Beau ===
Le Beau is a courtier in the Court of Duke Frederick; he commands the court.

=== Charles ===
Charles is the court-wrestler, who appears in the first Act of the play. He is a source of some preliminary information regarding the two Dukes and their two daughters. Orlando fights against him in the wrestling match. It is his defeat which makes Orlando a hero enabling him to win the heart of Rosalind. He is also the means to convey Oliver's villainy and serves as a foil to Orlando.

== The Exiled Court of Duke Senior in the Forest of Arden ==
=== Duke Senior ===
Duke Senior is the elder brother of Duke Frederick. He has been banished by his younger brother. He, along with his faithful follower, lives in the Forest of Arden and fleets his time careless as they did in the Golden World. His daughter Rosalind is kept at the court by Duke Frederick to company Celia. Duke Senior appears as a contented man who rarely feels adversity. At the end of the play he is restored with the kingdom by Duke Frederick. The father of Rosalind and the rightful ruler of the dukedom in which the play is set. Having been banished by his usurping brother, Frederick, Duke Senior now lives in exile in the Forest of Arden with a number of loyal men, including Lord Amiens and Jaques.

=== Rosalind ===
The daughter of Duke Senior. She disguises herself as Ganymede—a handsome young man—and offers herself as a tutor in the ways of love to Orlando.

=== Jaques ===
Jaques is one of the followers of Duke Senior. He acts like a cynic throughout the play. He is always in a melancholic mood, earning him the title of Melancholy Jaques and constantly criticizes the Duke and other characters. Also, he does not like the world of court and always criticizes it. He has one of Shakespeare's best-known speeches, "All the world's a stage".

=== Amiens ===
Lord Amiens was Elder Duke's friend. Amiens is one of the lords attending Duke Senior in the Forest of Arden. He agrees with the Duke when the latter says "sweet are the uses of adversity".

== The Household of the deceased Sir Rowland de Boys ==
=== Old Sir Rowland ===
The father of Orlando, Oliver, and Jacques. His death precedes the events of the play.

A possible 'real world' identity for this character, Sir Rowland Hill, has been conjectured.

=== Oliver de Boys ===
Oliver is the eldest son of Sir Rowland de Boys and the heir to his father's estates. In the beginning of the play he ill-treats his younger brother Orlando, denying him good upbringing and education. He acts like a villain and even tries to kill Orlando by instigating the wrestler, Charles. By the end of the play he has reformed and falls in love with Celia.

=== Jacques de Boys ===
He is the second son of Sir Rowland de Boys and the brother of Oliver and Orlando. He only appears at the end of the play when he brings the news of Duke Frederick's reformation.

=== Adam ===
Adam is the old faithful servant of the family of Sir Rowland de Boys, who accompanies Orlando into the Forest of Arden.

=== Dennis ===
He is a servant in the household of Oliver de Boys.

== Country folk in the Forest of Arden ==
=== Phoebe ===
A shepherdess who is in love with Ganymede who is really Rosalind in disguise. At the same time Silvius (another shepherd) who is madly in love with Phoebe tries to get her to love him back.

=== Silvius ===
Silvius is a young shepherd who represents the romantic lover. He is madly in love with Phoebe, a rural girl who does not return his love. Throughout the play, she constantly rebukes and insults Silvius. Rosalind feels sympathy for him and scolds him for having become a 'tame snake' because of his passion for Phoebe. Finally, he marries Phoebe with the clever manipulation of Rosalind.

=== Audrey ===
Audrey is a homely and ignorant shepherd girl. Touchstone introduces her to the Duke as 'a poor virgin, sir, an ill-favoured thing, sir, but mine own'. She is attracted by the courtly manners and wit of Touchstone. Their love is a parody of the romantic love of the hero and the heroine of the play.

=== Corin ===
Corin is an old shepherd who sells his former master's land to "Ganymede" and "Aliena" (the disguised Rosalind and Celia). Touchstone calls him a 'natural philosopher'.

=== William ===
William is a country lad who comes to profess his love for Audrey. When he is threatened by Touchstone that he would be beaten and killed if he does not give up Audrey, he does not challenge him.

=== Sir Oliver Martext ===
Sir Oliver Martext is a vicar who is called to perform the marriage of Touchstone and Audrey.

== Other characters ==
Lords and ladies in Duke Frederick's court

Lords in Duke Senior's forest court

Pages and musicians

Hymen, the God of Marriage
