= Hoffmaniada =

- Hoffmaniada
- Directed by: Stanislav Sokolov
- Written by: Stanislav Sokolov; Viktor Slavkin
- Based on: The Golden Pot, The Sandman, and Little Zaches Called Cinnabar by E. T. A. Hoffmann
- Produced by: Nikolay Makovsky; Boris Mashkovtsev; Sergey Strusovsky; Lika Blank; Akop Kirakosyan
- Starring: Vladimir Koshevoy; Aleksey Petrenko; Pavel Lyubimtsev; Slava Polunin; Anna Artamonova; Nikolay Kondrashov; Natalya Fisson; Anvar Libabov; Aleksandr Shirvindt
- Edited by: Stanislav Sokolov; Veronika Pavlovskaya
- Music by: Sandor Kalloś
- Animation by: Mikhail Shemyakin; Elena Livanova; Nikolay Livanov; Alla Solovyova; Katya Rykova; Igor Khilov
- Production company: Soyuzmultfilm
- Release dates: 18 February 2018 (Berlin International Film Festival); 11 June 2018 (AIAFF); 11 October 2018 (Russia)
- Running time: 75 minutes
- Country: Russia
- Language: Russian

Hoffmaniada (Russian: Гофманиа́да, romanized: Gofmaniáda) is a 2018 Russian stop motion-animated feature film from Soyuzmultfilm. The film is one of the first full-length puppet animated film in the recent history of the animation studio. The concept and the art design was done by Mikhail Shemyakin and is edited by Stanislav Sokolov and Veronika Pavlovskaya, written by Sokolov and Viktor Slavkin, and directed by Sokolov.

The screenplay incorporates story lines and characters from the work of E. T. A. Hoffmann (Little Zaches Called Cinnabar, The Golden Pot and The Sandman), with the main character being Hoffmann himself. In particular, it focuses on the duality between the imaginative universe of his writings and his real-life profession as a government clerk (based on his letters and journals). The film stars the voices of Vladimir Koshevoy, Slava Polunin, Natalya Fisson, Anvar Libabov, Anna Artamonova, Aleksey Petrenko, Pavel Lyubimtsev, and Aleksandr Shirvindt.

The first twenty minutes of the film were screened on 20 November 2006, in Petersburg House of Cinema and received positive reactions from various news outlets. The animated film was released in Russia on 11 October 2018 and is denoted as the entryway of the modern Soyuzmultfilm animation studio. The film was later distributed to Japan in 2019. The film has been recognized with accolades of the Golden Eagle Award, Icarus Award, and Brazil Stop Motion International Film Festival award.

== Plot ==
The protagonist of the film is Ernst Hoffmann, a young lawyer, musician, and writer who inhabits two dimensions at once: the imaginary world of his fictional works and the ordinary reality of a small town. During the day, Hoffmann sits behind legal papers working in the office, and then gives music lessons. At night, he composes magical stories and operas, dreaming of one day seeing his opera Undine on the big stage. He does secretly imagine transporting himself into the world of his magical fantasies. Soon, the young man could no longer distinguish between dream and reality. In the images of the heroes that Hoffmann himself penned, he will have to go through the most amazing and danger-filled adventures, which might not be merely fantasies from his own fairy-tales. The adventures include an underwater excursion, a sword-fight, and a ballet at the theatre.

Ernst Hoffmann becomes the titular character student Anselm who is featured in a romantic film with meetings with heroines in different times of his life: the first-in the beautiful Olympia, and the second-in the magical snake-girl Serpentine, and the third-in the posh Veronica. However, Ernst is subjected to the sorcery of an old merchant, the charlatan Coppelius and the watchmaker Paulman. Sandman the dreamy student is also obsessed with Olympia, a soulless clockwork-automaton and daughter of physicist mechanic Paulman. The wise royal archivist Lindhorst exiled from Atlantis patronizes Ernst and his literary hero, the student Anselm. Turning into a Fire-Salamander, he resists Ernst's plans to woo his daughter Serpentina. They make sinister plans against the main character. Love and magic intrigues are intertwined and happily resolved at the end of the film.

== Voice cast ==
Roles were voiced. To the left is Ernst meeting Veronica.

- Vladimir Koshevoy as Ernst Hoffmann / Anselm
- Aleksey Petrenko as Coppelius / Sandman
- Pavel Lyubimtsev as physicist Paulman / Top secret parrot
- Alexander Lenkov as the Old Witch (in the first version of the cartoon)
- Slava Polunin as Coppelius in the image of the pastor
- Anna Artamonova as Serpentina / Veronika / Olympia
- Nikolay Kondrashov (voice)
- Natalya Fisson (voice)
- Anvar Libabov (voice)
- Aleksandr Shirvindt as Lindhorst / Salamander

== History and technique ==
Soyuzmultfilm was ready to revive their animation studio. The establishment from Moscow like other businesses was beleaguered by the collapse of the Soviet Union in 1991. Despite the challenges, in 2001, Soyuzmultfilm confirmed about a grand project based on the works of German 19th century author E. T. A. Hoffmann (1776-1882). Soyuzmultfilm previously has not produced a feature film since 1985. The project combines the best traditions of classic Russian animation and modern technology. The film is Soyuzmultfilm's entry to the digital media industry and a turning point in its history. The film became one of the largest full-length and technically complex cartoons in the studio's recent history that took over fifteen years of production. The studio invited Mikhail Shemyakin to the project as animation director.

Both Germany and Russia are patrons of Hoffmann's stories. Russia in particular is linked to Hoffmann, as the author was born in the Kingdom of Prussia, Kaliningrad. Hoffmann is associated with the music of Russian composer Pyotr Ilyich Tchaikovsky. Almost all of the children in Russia know who Hoffmann is because of his fairy-tale The Nutcracker. The word "Hoffmaniada" (Russian: Гофманиада, lit. 'Gofmaniada') is part of the Russian lexicon meaning absurd or preposterous.

Mikhail Shemyakin the acclaimed theatre artist and sculptor from Saint Petersburg was acquainted with Hoffmann's fairy-tales ever since a young age. Shemyakin, was a patron of German romanticism literature. Hoffmann's stories were noteworthy to the director whom he believes has influenced Russian authors such as Dostoevsky, Gogol, and Serapion Brothers. Shemyakin is a resident of East Germany, and his favourite city is Königsberg (Kaliningrad) where his father was commandant just before World War 2. There he would grow up reading about Hoffmann and Brothers Grimm. As an artist, he can discern an Hoffmann-like influence in all the cities in Russia he would visit. In 2001, Shemyakin already was an Hoffmann artist who created sketches for costumes, sets, and masks for the ballet The Nutcracker for the Mariinsky Theatre. The director had an initial idea of adapting the stories to the theatre screens. The project was initiated by Soyuzmultfilm director Akop Kirakosyan, who invited Shemyakin to the project. Animation director Stanislav Sokolov stated Mikhail Shemyakin's direction gave new impetus to the art of drawing and animation at Soyuzmultfilm.

The director and script writer of the film is Stanislav Sokolov who has previously directed Shakespeare: The Animated Tales in the 1990s. The veteran animator from Soyuzmultfilm who has previously experience working with Soviet Union artists Ivan Ivanov-Vano and Boris Nemensky worked on one of the last animation films produced in the historic Soyuzmultfilm studio in 25 Dolgorukovskaya Street, near the Novoslobodskaya metro station. Sokolov was interested in such a production ever since the 1970s. During the pre-perestroika times, Sokolov applied for the film concept but the idea was shelved because Hoffmann's stories were deemed too frightful for children and mystical for adults.

"We managed to embody the world of Hoffmann full of amazing beauty and magic, which before the creation of the cartoon existed only in the works of the writer Hoffmann himself and in the imagination of the animators who worked on the film."

— Director Stanislav Sokolov on conceptualizing Hoffmaniada

Actual filming for the pilot began in late 2005 using stop-motion puppet animation as the medium to bring to animated life the various characters of the stories by E.T.A Hoffmann. Director Sokolov states, "Hoffmann's novels and short stories are perfect for stop motion. It is a technique that allows you to combine the visual effects of animated cinema with the materiality of the resources used. Thus, we create a tuning fork between real and fantasy elements."

The most active period of creativity occurred in 2005, when Shemyakin in the suburbs of New York City, made about 20 sketches of Hoffmaniada dolls in a short time. The main production designer of the film was Elena Livanova. Livanova created images of minor characters and turned some of Shemyakin's sketches into working sketches, and also translated the sketches into technical drawings for making dolls. Elena Livanova was assisted by the artist Nikolay Livanov. In total, about 150 dolls were created for the film.

The film was first intended as three independent film adaptations (Little Zaches Called Cinnabar, The Golden Pot, and The Sandman). However, the final film combines all the tales into a single narrative. With the exception of the popular Nutcracker, most of the characters of the German classics of Hoffmann are rarely filmed in cinematic format. Central to the film will be the character, E.T.A. Hoffmann himself, who is rejuvenated as a poor student Anselm who travels and interleaves the many fairy-tales described by the film. The film was intended to feature unusual fantastic interiors such as a crystal city, Atlantis, and a story line with deep philosophical meaning. The film is framed as a story within a story style where the author E.T.A. Hoffmann himself is transported into the magical world of his own fairy-tales and lives with his own characters. The film depicts the author as participating in his own plots where good triumphs over evil. The film makers wanted to unearth the inner emotions and thoughts the author himself would have undergone when writing the dramatic stories such as The Sandman.

== Production ==
=== Development ===
In November 2006, a preliminary twenty minute exhibition was held in Petersburg House of Cinema, featuring the main cast of about twenty puppets. Each puppet took no less than a month to make. The full film will have over 150 puppets, some of which will appear on the screen for only a few seconds. In the spring of 2008, a group of puppeteers created the dolls first before the script was made. The actual filming period for the rest of the film began in the summer. The animators wished to convey different layers of creativity and believed the film will be realized with utmost care. So they believed a slow production cycle while focusing more on details.

In 2008, after the completion of the sketches for the images of cartoon characters, the next stage in the production of dolls and filming process began. Initial reaction kept referencing the similarity of facial expressions between the puppet Hoffmann and director Stanislav Sokolov. A report from 1 September 2010 showed that work was still ongoing. On 3 June 2011, Soyuzmultdesign published an official booklet for the upcoming film, which says that preparation for shooting the second and final part of the film began on 3 March 2011, and that the final 90-minute film would be released in May 2014. Also, the official English name was revealed to be Hoffmaniada. On 23 July 2013, it was reported that the film is scheduled to be released in 2015. The cast of Aleksey Petrenko voiced Sandman, Pavel Lyubimtsev as Paulman, and Vladimir Koshevoy as Ernst Hoffmann. Anna Artamonova voiced all the three heroines.

=== The effects of the Soviet Union collapse ===
The film was intended as a wide release film of 78 minutes within the scope of ambition in context of the days of insolvency in 2001. A premiere at the Petersburg House of Cinema was held in 2006 despite the constrained budget. The animators then once thought of getting financial assistance from the West. In a 6 September 2010 interview, Shemyakin said that if funding were given, the film would be finished in a year and a half. However, as of January 2011, the film crew were either not being paid at all (as during one 6-month period) or being paid very little, so progress was very slow. The production cycle faced many discontinuations.

The studio was also battling the aftermath of the economic downturn bought by the Soviet Union collapse in 1991. In 1998, the ruble faced devaluation that bought on financial debt to many companies that lasted to the turn of the 21st century. From the most acclaimed animation studio of Russia, in 2006 their studio built in 1936 was almost sold to real estate developers. A land dispute against the budget-constrained and workforce-downsized association was pitting the animators as they drew and recorded Hoffmaniada.

They believed only the policies of a strong president such as President Franklin Roosevelt in the 1930s could save the studio and their culture. According to Moscow Times report, "The Soyuzmultfilm studios are a piece of history and the embodiment of a belief that humor, art and the wacky, wily adventures of two-dimensional animals can cheer, sustain and even elevate or teach." In December 2013, Shemyakin said in an interview that despite the lack of budget, enthusiastic animators would pitch in to help realize the project for free. He expressed hope for completion of the film in two to three years.

In 2014, director Stanislav Sokolov revealed the project initially split into different arcs would be combined into one feature film. The first part, “Veronica,” was made in 2010. The second and the third parts, “Hoffmann and the Secret of the Watchmaker” was completed in 2015. A March 2014 report by Vechernaya Moskva remarked the Dolgorukovskaya Street Soyuzmultfilm building turned into a sort of "Hoffmann's attic", as the production of the film progressed.

=== Revival ===
The historic Dolgorukovskaya Street Soyuzmultfilm studio gracing one of the last animated set pieces of the film created there before its closure.

The work was exemplary in context to Soyuzmultfilm history that usually featured about seventy people team. Hoffmaniada was recorded by a dozen member team with the talents of art director Elena Livanova, cameraman Igor Skidan-Boshin, two multipliers, two artists Ekaterina Bogacheva, Natalia Varlamova, assistant artist, props with others working outside the studio. However, despite the glacial production, the film was an opportunity for them to exhibit all their effort. Director Stanislav Sokolov was optimistic about the future of Soyuzmultfilm and Russian animation industry in general, as he believed the State of Russia is starting to invest and help the studios thrive in 2015.

On 8 June 2016, the long-term construction project was presented at the Historical and Art Museum in E.T.A. Hoffmann's own birthplace, Kaliningrad. The project managers were able to bypass their original milestone of 78 minutes of footage. On 29 November 2016, an historical finish to the history of Soyuzmultfilm was marked, as the final shots of Hoffmaniada as well as the final animation piece for the studio was recorded at the historical Dolgorukovskaya Street studio before moving to new premises provided by the Ministry of Culture. The final shot featured actor puppets being recorded in a miniature orchestra box designed in the style of German theatres of the 17th century. The official release of the full-length animation film in 2018 marked Soyuzmulfilm's new entry into the animation industry.

=== Themes ===
Ernst meeting Olympia, the automatonic daughter of alchemy-physicist Paulman.

The film will juxtapose documentary elements with the fantasique. The film will not only be an exhibition of hyperbolic fantasy characterizations of Hoffmann's fairy-tales such as the fantasy mermaid origins of the princess but also will be based on a biopic of the author. The script will be based on real events from Hoffmann's time as a government clerk gleaned from the author's letters and journals. The puppet film is intended to describe the possibility of the struggles of Hoffmann's mental state as an ordinary "copyist in an office, turns around and suddenly sees the noses of his colleagues turn into mouse faces, and a real mouse kingdom reigns under the table." Puppets were also derived from real-life people such as Herman Stepanov the avant-garde art school colleague of Mikhail Shemyakin and Russian poet Alexander Timofeevsky. The timeless theme of creativity in context to rational realism is another concept explored by the film. The script writer Viktor Slavkin had an innate creativity for writing that he unearthed after he switched his profession from architecture. The life situation parallels Hoffmann's own life.

According to Viktor Slavkin, "If Hoffmann did not have a world of dreams and fantasies, he would inevitably get drunk". The script tried to unearth Hoffmann's alleged alter ego Johannes Kreisler, the mysterious, volatile composer whom Hoffmann himself illustrated. The character has appeared in all of the novels described in the film. The film managed to combine discordant characters from Hoffmann's corpus such as Tiny Tsakhes, the Nutcracker, and the Sandman into a single narrative. A review found the approach to be "organic" to the point where the differences are never apparent. The film makers offered the viewer that Hoffmann was truly yearning for Atlantis through a magical love story hinging upon a trichotomy destiny. One of the three love stories features the fictional automaton Olympia described in the story The Sandman. The other heroines of the film include consul's daughter Veronica, and Serpentina. The three women at once embody the ideal of beauty in their own way, and Ernst will have to believe and choose the one that will bring him happiness. A duel of fates between Ernst and his character Sandman is the central conflict of the story whom Ernst knew ever since he was a child when he heard his nanny tell the tale of the nocturnal visitor who sprinkles sand in the eyes of children.

A review found the film to extend the boundaries of fairy-tales into the areas of surrealism. Particular attention was paid to the horror elements of the plot emphasized by the grotesque features on some of the puppets. A review found the film's horror elements extended to the bureaucracy that Hoffmann worked for that ties both his stories and biopic.

The time periods that the film depicts include the German bourgeoisie. The buildings, streets, bridges, and medieval houses are all evocative of the street landscape in Kaliningrad. The Gothic set pieces are depicted more in the style of Gaudí that starkly contrasts with the magical gardens set pieces of mystical Atlantis.

=== Animation ===
==== Context ====
Soyuzmultfilm continued the legacy of the ancient art of puppetry and stop motion. The creators of the film presented a classic three-dimensional puppet animation film with digital image processing which they believe is more efficient than virtual 3D animation because the characters are molded by the hands using different materials and is inexpensive. Despite initial predictions that by the 1990s, 3D would replace the art of stop-motion films, the animators were pleased that students and connoisseurs of puppet animation would return to the studio to resume the art form in the 2000s.

The film used all the techniques that digital puppet animation afforded to the animators when the movement started in the 1980s. The technique of replaceable articulation or the use of replaceable lower jaws of the character conditionally imitating speech was a major innovation in puppet animation. The animators drew inspiration from the classic stop-motion films of Ivan Ivanov-Vano such as Go There, Don't Know Where and those by Tim Burton. The film is constructed in the traditions of the 18th and 19th century. A recording of ancient 18th-century minuets was used to describe the choreography of the dance partners in Hoffmaniada.

==== Animator's reaction ====
The film took over nine years to make with just a thirty-minute fragment, not including work on the script, sketches, storyboards, making dolls and scenery, taking more than a year to make. Each day, the animator can record about five seconds of video. Animators revealed despite the difficulties in expressing the puppets in terms of expressions like singing or grimacing, they are more amenable to the animators and therefore are more pleasant to work with. Animators for the film continue to note that working with puppet films are invigorating and have certain surprises that might go unnoticed while only watching the film. Director Sokolov explains, a special atmosphere is evident only in stop-motion that uses "real space and genuine textures."

==== Puppeteers at work ====
Each puppet doll was intricately designed by craftsmen by hand. The characters have unique outfits modeled after sketches that were then attached to the models by pins. Work on the female puppets as well as the young protagonists was the most difficult to construct. Each puppet required fastidious, pinpoint accuracy. For example, Hoffmann is designed with a waistcoat and a frill all stained with coffee and wine. A group of artists in a workshop would have different replacements of each puppet that is made of an amalgam of plastic and steel. Additional materials they worked with included wood, cardboard, plywood, carpentry tools, paper, gouache, and brushes. The puppets were drawn according to the motifs of the stories that required a grotesque form with unrealistically long noses. The drawing style only added to the expressiveness of the characters.

Ernst Hoffmann/Anselm the main character of the film.

Tatiana Lykosov was the puppet animation director. The papier-mâché puppet actors are constructed by a metal skeleton on hinges. In order to convey expression onto the puppets it was necessary for the animator to understand the mood of the puppet and how they behave in certain situations. A report revealed the heads of the characters, express three different emotions: neutral, smiling and menacing. After sawing the head, the eyes are inserted inside made by balls that move in the same way as in a living person or a bird. The animators also designed the miniaturized props for the film such as candlesticks placed on the tables, paintings hanging on the walls or the piano, sofas, and chairs. The most difficult shot was the appearance of the character the Sea King who had to be depicted in smooth locomotion since the character had only a tail and no legs. The tail made of rubber with a metal hinge structure inside was attached to a coordinate table that moved through cogs.

==== Camera ====
Shooting of the puppets are carried out with a Mark II camera in 16:9 format and in 4K resolution, suitable for a large screen. Light filters were used to avoid the puppets having a rough background. Acceleration of stop motion puppets is an art that the studio perfected by working with the different dolls. They carefully perfected speed and center of gravity such as the fall of a leaf in its own wavering velocity, or the speed of a doll that moves only millimeters in each frame in order to avoid ragged movements. Cameraman Igor Skidan-Bosin, together with other technicians, invented an innovative suspended moving camera system that can drive right inside the scenery. The system is powered by a computer. Using special sliders, the camera can capture dynamic movements such as a revolution around dancing puppets.

== Release ==
=== Theatrical ===
Hoffmaniada visited many cities of Russia including Siberia in 2014 as part of the film train program known as the VGIK-95 that was intended to educate the citizens of the Russian federation on Russian cinema. The train VGIK-95 departed on 23 September. On 11 February 2016, for the 240th anniversary of E.T.A. Hoffmann, Regional Historical and Art Museum of Vienna opened an exhibition Meetings with Hoffmann featuring Hoffmaniada. The exhibit featured details on how Hoffmann was influenced by Mozart, to the point where he named himself Amadeus. The film was anticipated for many several screenings in cinemas by the end of 2016. Due to post-production the official premiere was scheduled for the fall of 2018. In 2017, International Youth Film Forum in Sochi, Stanislav Sokolov presented excerpts from Hoffmaniada.

Soyuzmultfilm was honored to present the film in Hoffmann's own homeland, Germany on 18 February 2018 at the 68th Berlin International Film Festival. At the festival, the film was appraised by distributors from France and Germany. The Russian House of Science and Culture in Berlin also constructed an exhibit about the film during the same time as the Berlinale. At the 13th Open Russian Festival of Animated Films in March, Hoffmaniada officially premiered in Russian soil for the first time. The festival director remarked the film was the highlight of the event. At the June 12, festival Mirror in the Ivanovo Region, for the first time an animated film in Hoffmaniada was enlisted for the competition program. The film became part of the cultural program at the IV Eastern Economic Forum in Vladivostok in 2018. On the first day of October, the campus of the Moscow School of Management Skolkovo opened an exhibition of the film. Four days later, Novoekino released a documentary featuring the delicate production of the film. Six days later, Hoffmaniada premiered in wide-release format.

On 24 August, director Sokolov presented the film at the Brazil Stop Motion International Film Festival in Recife. In the interview, the director stated the final cut removed many scenes and hopefully a DVD home video release will include the final scenes as well. In October 28, the film was presented at the Russian Seasons festival in Italy. In December, the film's sets and dolls were exhibited at the Nicholas Roerich Museum in Moscow. The film was presented at the Russian cinema Gorky Fest of 2019. On 5 May 2019, the film premiered in TV at the channel Russia-K. In that same year, Hoffmaniada released in Japan. The film was the highlight event at the Tokyo Photographic Art Museum.

After the premiere in Russia, the film is currently being presented in a variety of film festivals for international distribution. At the Cannes Film Festival of 22 June 2020, Hoffmaniada was shown to the film market. In the Toronto International Film Festival of September, the film was presented by Soyuzmultfilm. In the 41th virtual edition of AFM in November, Hoffmaniada was presented to the North American audience. Animation news website Cartoon Brew particularly commended about the film at the AFM, and denoted it as one of the seven most notable projects at the AFM. In September, the Golden Mask Festival featured the film in the Amur capital of Blagoveshchensk.

=== Critical response ===
Kinoafisha reviewer Veronika Skurikhina couldn't comprehend how a Tim Burton of Russia film would ever exist, but if such a person existed, it would be Stanislav Sokolov of Hoffmaniada. The review also "noted that the crooked, ornate, metaphorical, aristocratic, and simply old Hoffmann language is almost completely preserved in the voice-over."

Yegor Belikov review from TASS, remarked the film is an accurate description of Hoffmann's "phantasmagoria without fear of getting lost in them, and their dedication inspires respect." The zealous effort put into this work makes "Soyuzmultfilm one of the last studios in the world that would be capable of such large-scale work." Anastasia Ivakhnova of 25 Card, with 4.5 stars remarks the film is Sokolov's magnus opus. The film managed to describe how Hoffmann was "so closely intertwined with his fantasies, and soon, despite the apparent external dissimilarity of Ernst and Anselm, it becomes increasingly difficult to distinguish the world of conditional reality from fictional from and to Atlantis". The execution of the concept "is enough to make Hoffmaniada take its rightful place among the best animated works of the studio and mark the return of "Soyuzmultfilm" to the big screen."

Although the film was an adaptation of horror stories by Hoffmann, several reviews remarked the animation studio unearthed the fairy-tale qualities of the stories that made it presentable to the children audience. Tlum review thought the film can be seen by even the youngest audience. Anna Ilyina of Rossiyskaya Gazeta also believed in the spectral quality of the film: "Sometimes it seems that Hoffmann himself invisibly followed what was happening - challenged modern creators, suspended the filming process, had fun playing with time, and then decided to manifest himself in the modern Russian present." Mir Fantastiki review also affirmed the film is light in tone, "it is amazing how Soyuzmultfilm, taking as a basis the dark stories of Hoffmann, was able to create such a bright picture. The cartoon is not scary to watch, and after watching it for a long time there is a good mood."

Denis Stupnikov for Intermedia giving the film 4 stars noting the puppets exude the style of the art form of Mikhail Shemyakin. The review noted the "light music" that went into the film such as incorporation of E.T.A. Hoffmann's own opera Undine.

Maria Tereshchenko of Kino Teatr, believed the film is like a "completed work of another era" in the 2000s, when the film was anticipated to be completed. "Hoffmaniada conveys acutely and accurately the feelings of a romantic, artist, poet, locked in everyday reality, but living not at all by it, but by a phantom life" and is an anachronism that "could only arise in the timelessness in which it was shot, when the management of the Soyuzmultfilm studio changed every few years, and the director had the highest degree of freedom from the dictates of officials and financiers."

Daria Budanova of Mir Fantastiki, believes Hoffmann's stories are difficult to adapt because 'the motif of the mirror image of the real world and the fantastic world, their inevitable interpenetration, permeates all of Hoffmann's work. That is why his fairy-tales are so difficult to film. However "Stanislav Sokolov succeeded" and "managed to understand the genius of German Romanticism." In terms of the puppets, "outwardly, they resemble figures from Tim Burton's Corpse Bride: detailed and outrageously caricatured images, which, however, are almost devoid of computer processing, and therefore unnatural cartoonishness. They seem to turn into real live actors."

A review from J.B. Spins wonders whether acclaimed director of the Soviet Union, Tarkovsky's famous unfinished screenplay Hoffmaniana could have been finished considering how "screenwriter Victor Slavkin so cleverly and seamlessly integrate Hoffmann into his own stories." Spins thinks the movie is Quixotic, with "the sets, backdrops, and costumes alone make Hoffmaniada one of grandest literary period dramas of the year. It also might be the best stop-motion animated feature since My Life as a Zucchini, even on a par with Jiří Barta's Toys in the Attic." French review Little Big Animation noted the areas where the film could have improved such as "the rhythm of the editing." Also the viewers are "immersed oneself so far in the mirror game" despite a "lack benchmarks and subtitles no longer follow."

KinoKultura review by Mihaela Mihailova states the film "is auteur cinema meets bedtime story—a tad bewildering, but nevertheless an enchanting fairy-tale that should fascinate both young and mature viewers, albeit for different reasons". The lighting of the film is evocative of F.W. Murnau's Nosferatu (1922). A Japan Cinema Today review from Kaoru Hirasawa gave the film 4 stars remarking, "It's like a dream you see with your eyes open."

=== Accolades ===
Award	Date of ceremony	Category	Recipient(s) and nominee(s)	Result
Kinoros	2007	Full-length animated film	Hoffmaniada	Nominated
Mirrors Ivanovo	12 June 2018	Mirrors	Hoffmaniada	Nominated
Shanghai International Film Festival	15 June 2018	Animated Films	Hoffmaniada	Nominated
International Film Festival of Family and Children's Films (Yaroslavl)	8 July 2018	In the Family Circle	Hoffmaniada	Nominated
Asia Pacific Screen Awards	29 November 2018	Best Animated Feature Film	Hoffmaniada	Nominated
Golden Eagle Award	25 January 2019	Best Animated Film	Hoffmaniada	Won
Brazil Stop Motion International Film Festival	24 August 2018	Feature Film	Hoffmaniada	Won
Brazil Stop Motion International Film Festival	24 August 2018	Honorary Director	Stanislav Sokolov	Won
Nika Award	30 March 2019	Animated Films	Hoffmaniada	Nominated
Icarus Award (Ikar)	8 April 2019	The Movie	Hoffmaniada	Nominated
Icarus Award (Ikar)	8 April 2019	Production Design	Elena Livanova Nikolay Livanov Alla Solovyeva Mikhail Shemyakin	Won
Sunny Island	6 September 2019	Jury Diploma	Stanislav Sokolov	Won
National Television Award "High Five!"	10 September 2019	Favourite Cartoon	Hoffmaniada	Nominated

== Tie-in material and adaptations ==
In October 2013 at the Mipcom television market in Cannes, it was reported that, in addition to the feature film, a series of 26 13-minute episodes called Tales of Hoffmann will be made for television, each one based on a particular Hoffmann tale. The series will use the same puppets as are used in the film.

The remaining Hoffmaniada's puppet pavilion is still featured in the exhibition hall of Soyuzmultfilm in Moscow. Although all of the major details are empty, the eponymous Hoffmann is still shown playing the piano. The film is dedicated to the script writer and playwright Viktor Slavkin, who died during time of the post-production for the film.

The city of Kaliningrad, where the legends of Hoffmann's fairy-tales were originally penned, welcomed the donations of dolls, sets, and sketches from Hoffmaniada. They are now preserved at the Kaliningrad Museum of Fine Arts. The exhibit Hoffmann's City. Secrets of Two Worlds that opened in October 2020, within the newly renovated basement under the former Königsberg Stock Exchange is thought to be a gateway for citizens to remember their rich cultural heritage. In addition, Soyuzmultfilm and Kaliningrad pledged to cooperate in the field of animation.

== See also ==
- History of Russian animation
- List of stop-motion films
