= Chris Grace =

Chris Grace may refer to:

- Chris Grace (broadcaster) (born 1946), British broadcaster, film director and founder and former CEO of the Shakespeare Schools Festival
- Chris Grace (actor), American actor and scriptwriter

== See also ==
- Christopher Grace (born 1978), American actor best known as Topher Grace
