= Celia (As You Like It) =

- As You Like It character
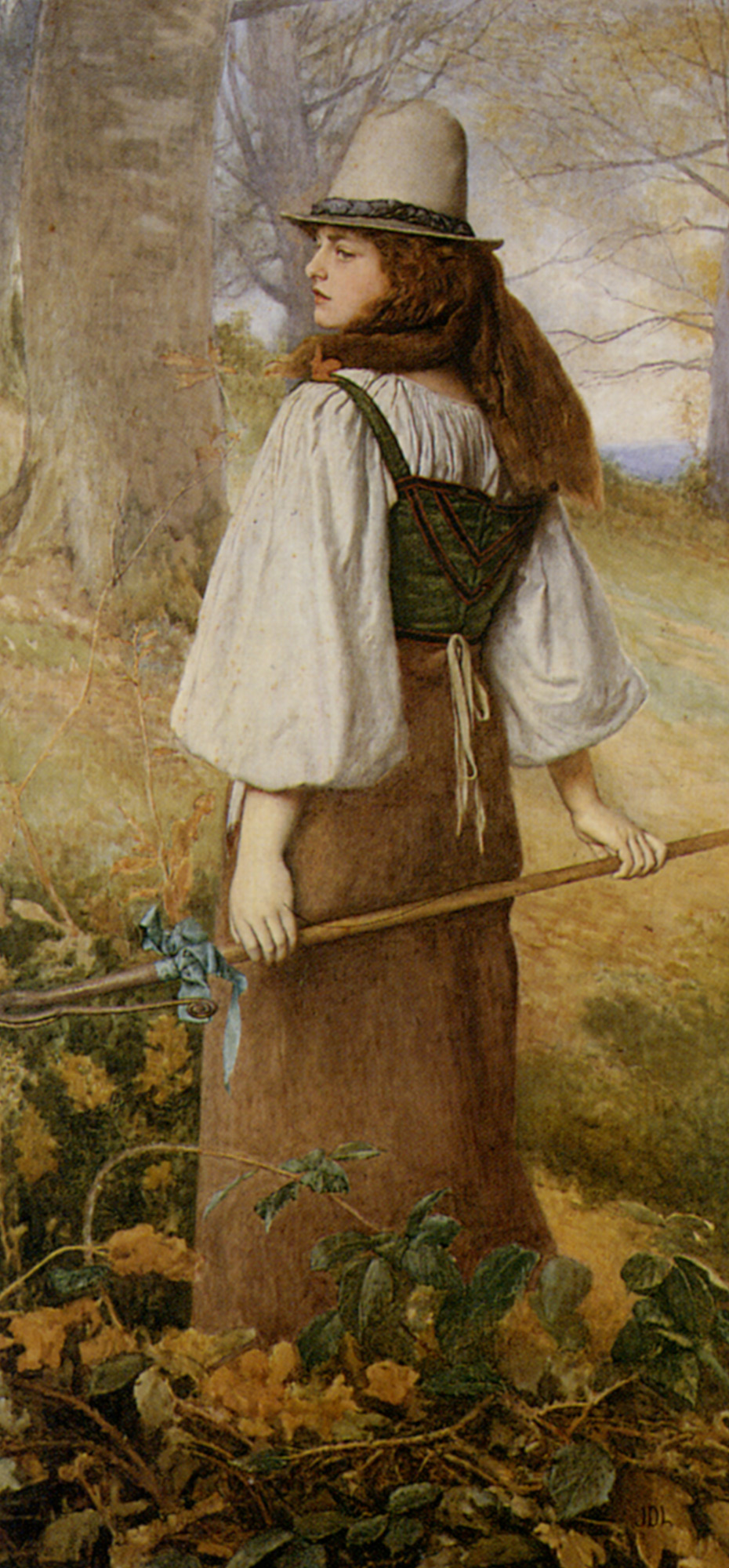
- Painting portraying Celia by James Dromgole Linton
- Created by: William Shakespeare

In-universe information
- Family: Duke Frederick (father); Rosalind (cousin)

Celia is one of the important characters of Shakespeare's As You Like It.

Celia is the daughter of Duke Frederick and niece of the banished Duke Senior. Celia and Rosalind are cousins but they have sisterly affection.

== Physical appearance ==
Celia is beautiful, but with a beauty less sparkling than that of Rosalind. Orlando describes both of them as "fair and excellent ladies".

Celia is shorter than her cousin and less majestic in appearance. She has a gentle expression combined with a habitual serious appearance. Hence Rosalind addresses her at one time as "my pretty little coz" (As You Like It 4.1/218), and at another as, "sad brow and true maid" (As You Like It 3.2/218–219).

== Character ==
Celia is silent and reserved. She is more conventional than Rosalind, and hence more worldly and prudent. Her silence is in contrast to Rosalind's talkative nature. However, Celia, by her prudence, exercises command over herself as well as over others. When the two cousins are alone, Celia is full of life and humor, but in the presence of others she is content to play the part of a spectator. She first listens and judges what to speak, then talks exactly opposite to Rosalind. Some consider that Celia's individual character has been overlooked by literary critics in favor of the more central character of Rosalind.

== Love for Rosalind ==
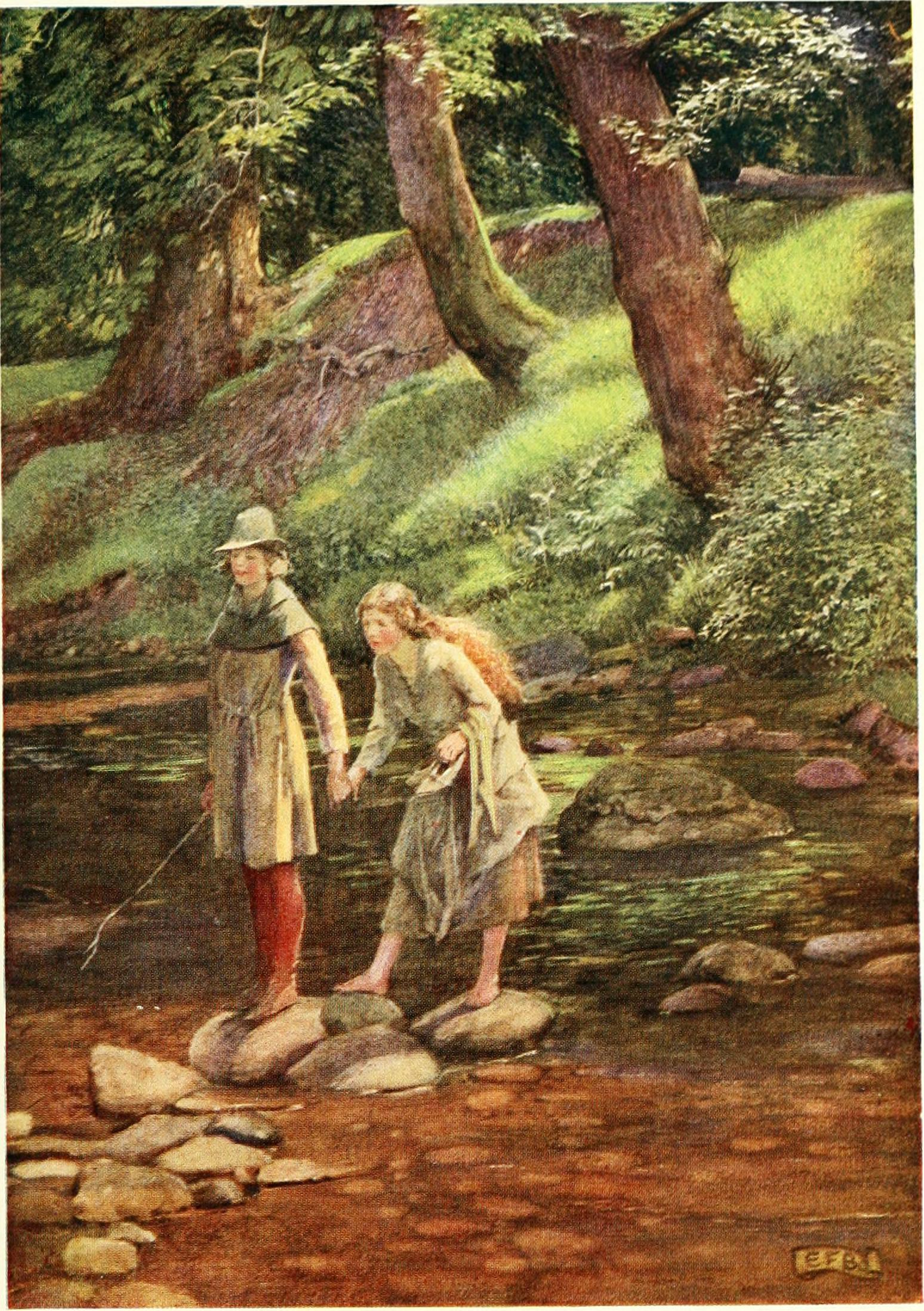
Painting of Rosalind (left) and Celia by Eleanor Fortescue-Brickdale

Celia's love for Rosalind knows no limits and is frequently referred to in the play. Charles, the wrestler, relates that Celia loves her cousin so much that she would have followed Rosalind into exile in case Rosalind too had been banished along with her father.

Le Beau, the courtier, describes their love as "dearer than the natural bond of sisters" (As You Like It 1.2/277). This shows the closeness of their friendship and the supportive nature of their companionship.

== Marriage to Oliver ==
Celia's love for Oliver is sudden, intense and uncontrollable, despite the knowledge of Oliver's past wicked deeds. In this connection, it should be remembered that love in Shakespeare is an irrational passion.

Celia's marriage with Oliver has been criticised by many critics. Stopford Brooke opines that this marriage is against probability because it looks strange that Oliver should change in a moment from the scoundrel. But her marriage with Oliver does not bring disgrace to her character. Oliver was a bad character but has changed into a good one by a sudden stroke. So Celia's marriage with Oliver is not a blot on her character.

== Alternative interpretations ==
It has been suggested that Celia's role in the play is "subversive", in the sense that she adds to the sexual complications of the plot by her friendship with the cross-dressing Rosalind. Celia effectively sets up home with Rosalind in the forest, requiring no male presence, and her marriage to Oliver may be regarded as a means of prolonging their relationship rather than the result of any affection she feels for him.

== Performance ==
Celia has been played by various notable actresses on screen. Sophie Stewart played Celia in a 1936 film, Rosalind Knight in the 1963 UK television series, Angharad Rees in the 1978 BBC version of the play directed by Basil Coleman, and Romola Garai in the 2006 production directed by Kenneth Branagh. In a 1985 production by the Royal Shakespeare Company (RSC), Celia was played by Fiona Shaw. Sophie Thompson played Celia with the Renaissance Theatre Company, and in 1989 it was her first role with the RSC. In New York City, Cloris Leachman played Celia in 145 performances on Broadway at the Cort Theatre in 1950, and Renée Elise Goldsberry played Celia in 2012 at the Delacorte Theater
