= Little Zaches called Cinnabar =

Germanic folk tale

"Little Zaches"
- Short story by E. T. A. Hoffmann
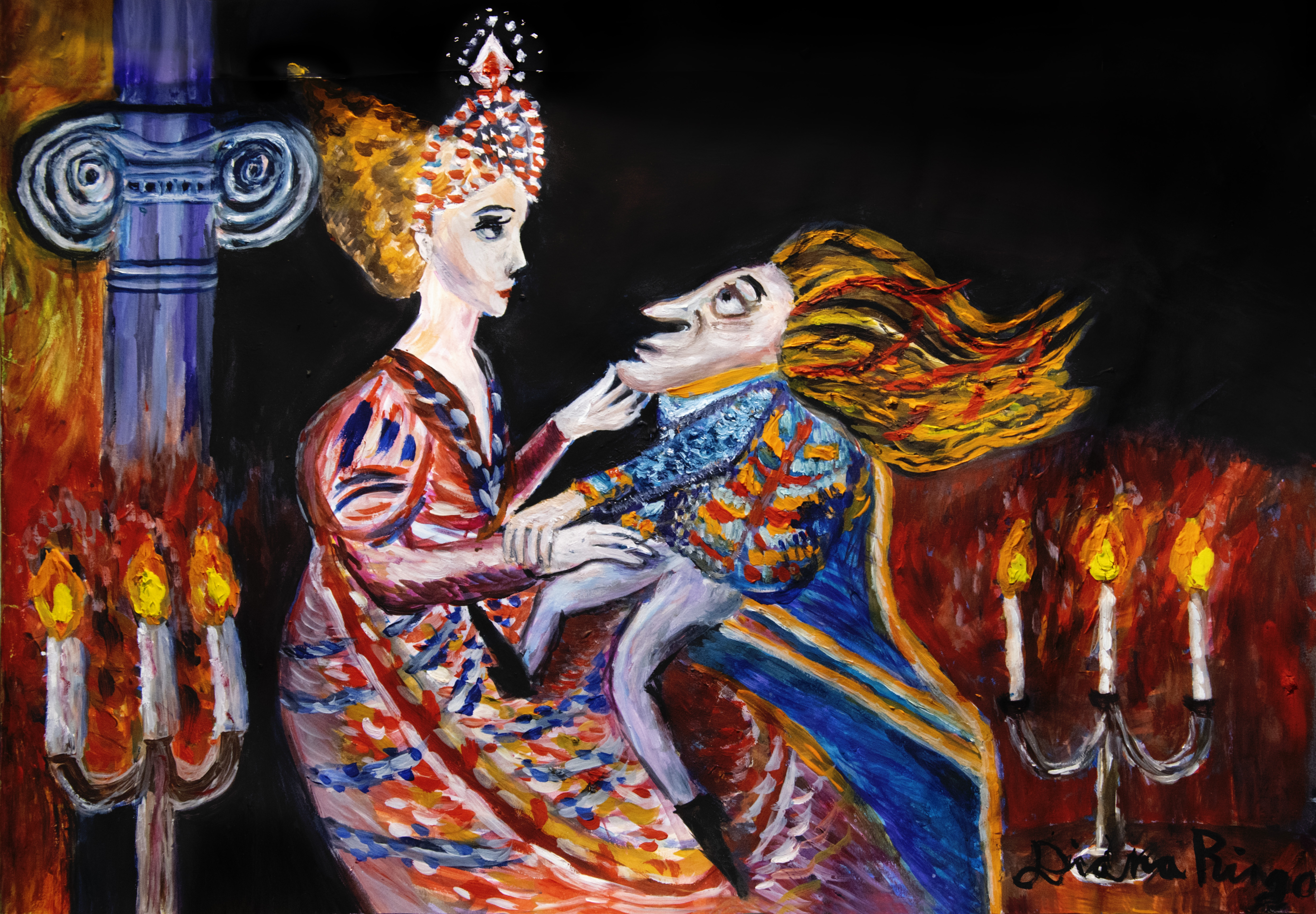
- Cinnaber as minister on the lap of the fairy Rosabelverde
- Original title: Klein Zaches genannt Zinnober
- Language: German

Publication
- Published in: 1819

Little Zaches Called Cinnabar (German: Klein Zaches genannt Zinnober) is an 1819 satirical fairytale fantasy novella by E. T. A. Hoffmann.

== Plot summary ==
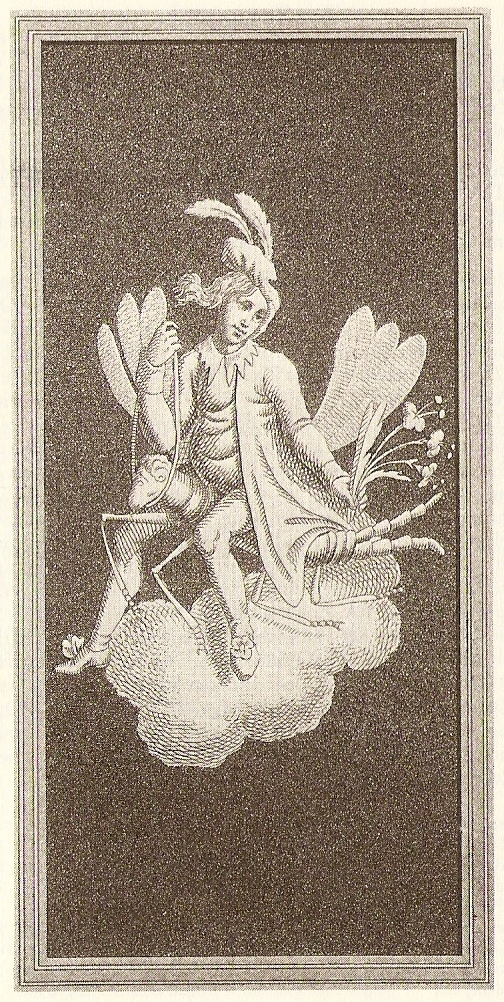
Magician Prosper Alpanus on a dragonfly. Copper engraving for the cover of the first edition, engraved by Carl Friedrich Thiele (1780-1836) based on a drawn design by E.T.A. Hoffmann

The events of the book occur in a small, unnamed German principality. Once, under the Fürst Demetrius, it used to be an idyllic spot, which attracted numerous fairies to live there. However, Demetrius's son, Paphnutius, at the urging of his First Minister, had, in the name of Enlightenment, banished most of the fairies and confiscated their property. The book takes place during the reign of Barsanuph, an unspecified time after Paphnutius's death.

One day, Rosabelverde, one of the few fairies left in the principality, encounters a poor, unlucky peasant woman named Liese, suffering after having given birth to a disfigured, developmentally challenged boy named Zaches (often compared in appearance to an alraun). Thoughtlessly, the fairy casts a charm on the boy so that most people, mostly philistines, stop seeing him as unsightly. Now people are drawn to him and any praiseworthy deed performed in his presence is attributed to him. And vice versa, as soon as he does something disgusting or shameful (which is his typical behavior) - in the eyes of those present, someone else seems to have done an abomination; most often the one who suffered the most from the boy's antics. A local priest, impressed by the boy's supposed charm, takes Zaches in to raise.

The novel then switches to a time over a decade later. Zaches, now having taken the name Zinnober, comes to a university. Thanks to the gift of the good fairy, the dwarf enchants Professor Mosh Terpin (possessed by a peculiar vision of the "German Spirit") and his daughter Candida. Only the melancholic poet-student Balthazar, who is in love with the beautiful girl, sees the true appearance of the villain. Artists also have this ability (violinist Sbiocca, singer Bragazzi), as well as foreigners. Later they are joined by Balthazar's friends: Fabian and Pulcher. Zaches-Zinnober does not waste time, and, taking advantage of other people's successes, quickly makes a career at the court of Barsanuph and prepares to marry Candida.

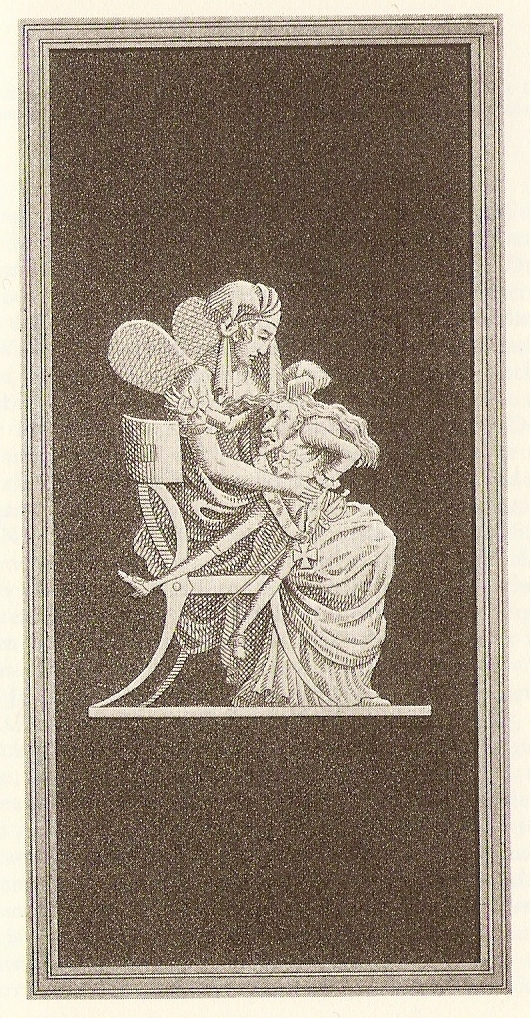
Zinnober as minister on the lap of the fairy Rosabelverde. Contemporary copper engraving for the cover of the first edition, engraved by Carl Friedrich Thiele (1780-1836) based on a sketch by E.T.A. Hoffmann

Balthazar's desperation eventually brings him to Prosper Alpanus, himself a mage who survived Paphnutius's reforms. After some research, the mage manages to determine the truth. Rosabelvelde arrives at his house, where they have a brief duel before the mage manages to destroy the comb with which she periodically reinforced the magic, contained in three fiery hairs upon the dwarf's head. During the celebration of Zinnober's betrothal to Candida, Balthazar, as instructed by Alpanus, manages to destroy the hairs. With the illusion gone, now mistaken for an alraun by some and a monkey by others, Zinnober flees into his house where he ends drowning in a chamber pot with sewage.

Due to Alpanus's magic, people still perceive the dead Zaches as smart and handsome, allowing him to be buried with honor. Barsanuph meets Liese, now an onion seller. He likes her onions so much he makes her the royal supplier, finally allowing her and her husband to live in comfort.

Balthazar and Candida get married. Alpanus departs the principality due to business with some old friends, leaving his estate and other property to the couple.

=== Characters ===
- 'Little Zaches, nicknamed Zinnober' is the son of a poor peasant woman, gifted by the fairy Rosabelverde with the magical power of attracting people to himself and taking other people's merits.
- Balthazar - a student at Kerepes University
- Fabian - Balthazar's friend and fellow student.
- Mosh Terpin - a professor of natural sciences at Kerepes University, whose lectures Balthazar attends.
- Candida - the daughter of Mosh Terpin and the beloved of Balthazar.
- Fairy Rosabelverde - a fairy who bewitches Little Zaches.
- Prosper Alpanus - a wandering magician.
- Paphnutii - a prince obsessed with the introduction of enlightenment in his land.
- Barsanuph - Descendant of Paphnutii, ruler of the land during the main events. Neutral toward magic.
- Liese - Zaches' mother, a poor peasant woman.

== Origin ==
According to the questionable information from Hoffmann's friend Julius Hitzig, the author of Little Zaches was stimulated by fever visions that plagued him during a severe liver and nerve ailment in the spring of 1819. In reality, Hoffmann fell ill in the spring of 1818 and was already working on the fairy tale at the end of 1818. On January 24, 1819, he sent Prince Pückler-Muskau an author's copy corrected by himself; the story, “the birth of a somewhat exuberant ironic fantasy”, has just left the printing press. The work was published by the Berlin publishing house F. Dümmler.

== Impact ==
Very soon after the story was published critical pieces detailed the literary models that Little Zaches supposedly relied on. Hoffmann was not very surprised “when he came across a review in which [...] every source was carefully mentioned from which the author is said to have drawn inspiration. The latter was of course pleasant to him insofar as it gave him an opportunity to examine these sources himself and enrich his knowledge. "

The literary response to Little Zaches was mixed. Some critics did not appreciate that moral and theological reflections were voiced against a mingling of the supernatural with an almost carnival-like cheerfulness. The story received recognition in extensive reviews, for example in the weekly literary newspaper and in the Heidelberg yearbooks.

The figure of Little Zaches was spread particularly through its portrayal in the 1881 Jacques Offenbach's opera The Tales of Hoffmann, where Hoffmann sings the famous song by Little Zaches: "Once upon a time at Eisenack's court ..." The Russian composer Nikolai Karetnikov made a ballet adaptation.

The Berlin band Coppelius composed the world's first steampunk opera based on the novel, which premiered on November 14, 2015, at the Gelsenkirchen Music Theater.

When Uwe Tellkamp was asked what kind of community the German Democratic Republic was, she recalled E.T.A. Hoffmann's description of the fictional principality in the fairy tale Little Zaches: “What was the GDR? [...] A [...] snail shell of the ludi magister of the E.T.A. Hoffmann University of Kerepes ”. Shortly thereafter, Tellkamp judged: “Father of all best literature on the problem [GDR] is, in my opinion, E.T.A. Hoffmann, with whom the (bad) dreams creep into reality.

== Popular culture ==
- The character of Little Zaches was used to parody Vladimir Putin in the NTV show Puppets. The role of the fairy was assigned to the owner of ORT Boris Berezovsky.
- The story was adapted in the 2018 Russian film Hoffmaniada.
