= Slava's Snowshow =

Clown stage show by Slava Polunin

- Genre: Contemporary circus
- Location: Russia

Creative team
- Creator: Slava Polunin
- Official website

Slava Polunin in Snowshow

Slava's Snowshow is a stage show created and staged by Russian performance artist Slava Polunin. The show won the Drama Desk Award for Unique Theatrical Experience and was nominated for the Tony Award for Best Special Theatrical Event.

== Productions ==
Slava's Snowshow made its world premiere in October 1993 in Moscow.

Slava's Snowshow was then performed at the Edinburgh Fringe in August 1996.

Slava's Snowshow opened Off-Broadway on September 8, 2004 at the Union Square Theatre, created and staged by Slava Polunin, with costumes and scenic design by Anna Hannikainen. The show closed on January 7, 2007.

The show opened on Broadway at the Helen Hayes Theatre on December 7, 2008 and closed on January 4, 2009 after 7 previews and 35 performances. The show was created and staged by Slava Polunin, with sound by Rastyam Dubinnikov, lighting by Alexander Pecherskiy and art direction by Gary Cherniakhovskii.

The show opened at the Old Vic in London in 1997. The show ran at the Royal Festival Hall, London from December 17, 2012 to January 7, 2013. The show returned to the Royal Festival Hall from December 18, 2017 to January 4, 2018. The show ran at the Bluma Appel Theatre at St. Lawrence Centre, Toronto in December 2018. The reviewer wrote: " 'Slava’s Snowshow' is a puzzling theatrical art form, but strangely alluring to watch as I couldn’t take my eyes off the performers. Their movements are precisely choreographed and timed either to the music or the sounds echoing throughout the auditorium."

The show ran on Broadway at the Stephen Sondheim Theatre in a limited engagement, from November 11, 2019 through January 5, 2020.

== Overview ==
The show features a group of clowns wearing green with one clown wearing yellow, in a "celebration of winter and snow."

== Awards and nominations ==
The show won the 2005 Drama Desk Award for Unique Theatrical Experience.

Anna Hannikainen was nominated for the 2005 Lucille Lortel Award for Outstanding Costume and Scenic Design.

Slava's Snowshow won the 1998 Olivier Award for Best Entertainment.

== Gallery ==
From the Snowshow performance in Vienna, Austria, 2008

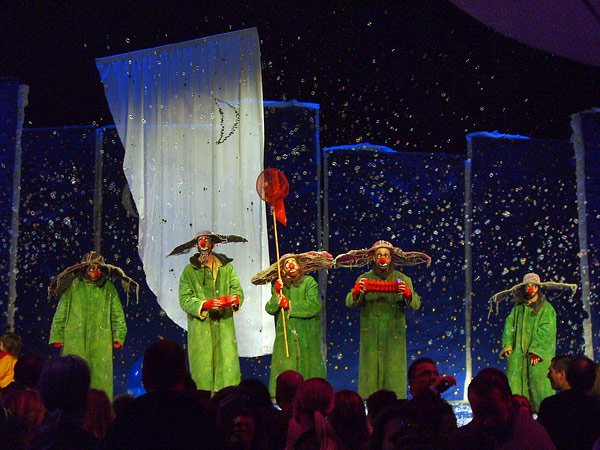

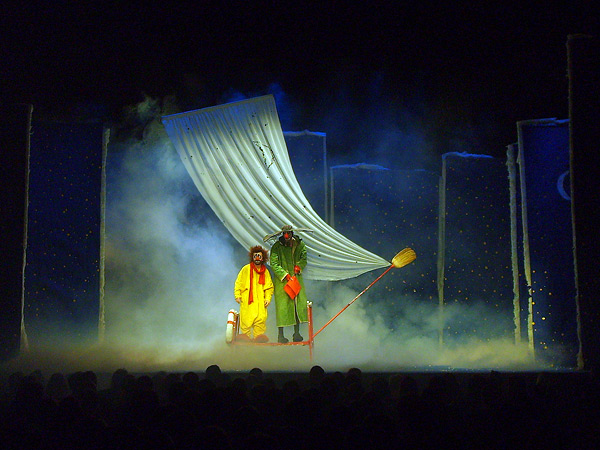

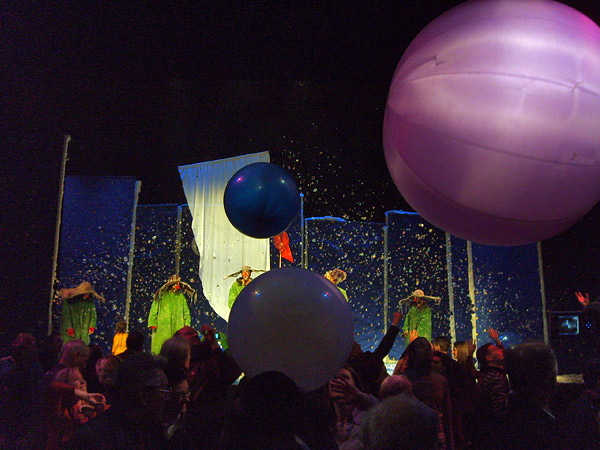
From the Snowshow performance in San Francisco, 2006

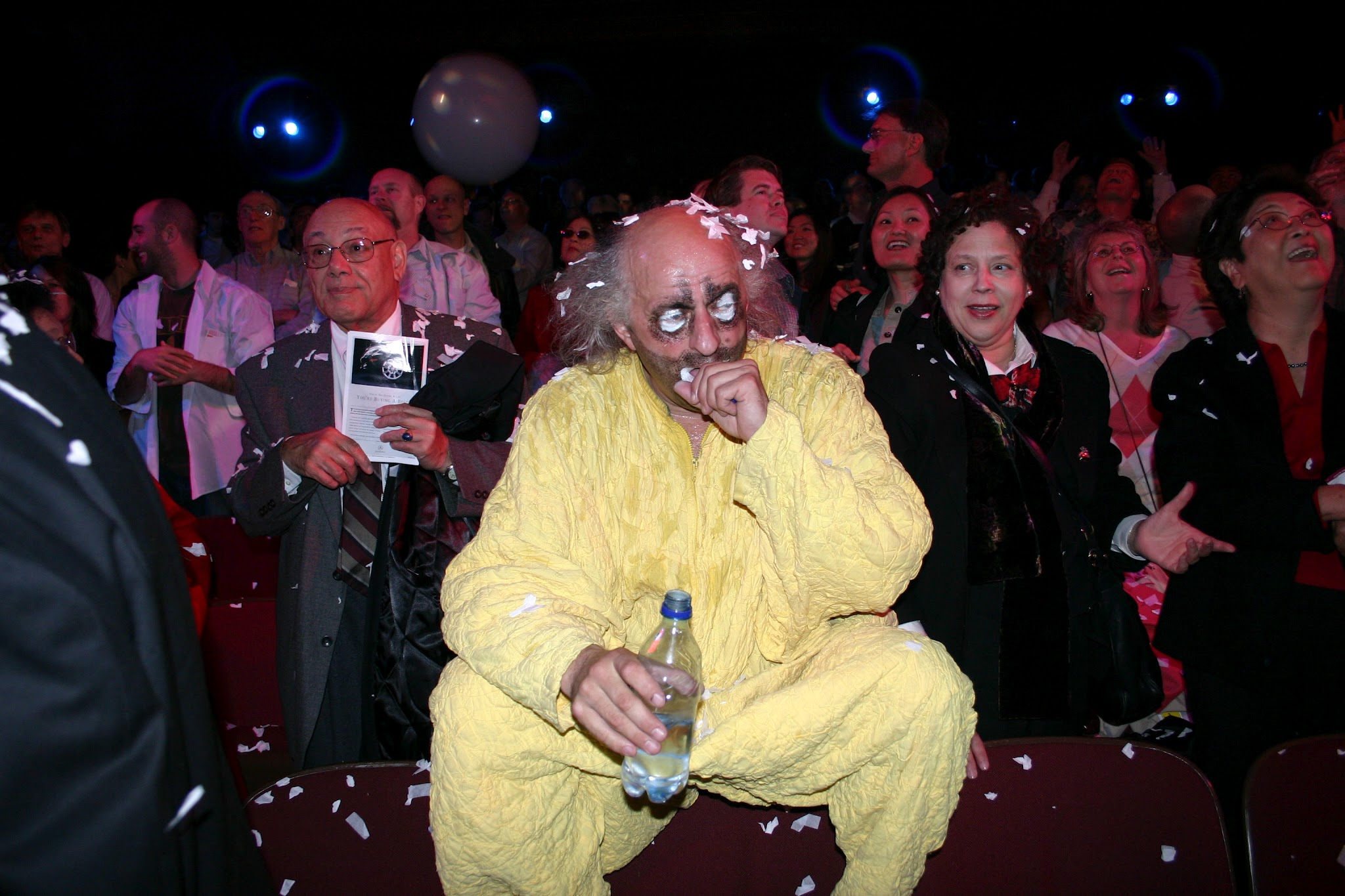

== Music ==
1. La Petite Fille de la mer - Vangelis
2. Chariots of Fire - Vangelis
3. Stalakdrama - Yello
4. Peter Gunn Theme - Henry Mancini
5. Bolero - Maurice Ravel
6. Le soldat Tufaiev se marie (Soldier Tufaiev Gets Married) - Jean-Mark Zelwer
7. Blue Canary - Vincent Fiorino
8. Mas que Nada - Luiz Henrique Rosa
9. Toccata and Fugue in D minor - Johann Sebastian Bach
10. Kaleb - Ivan Volkov
11. Krasivaya - Roman Dubinnikov
12. Illusion (feat. Jorge Struntz) - Stéphane Grappelli
13. Edges of Illusion - John Surman
14. Concierto de Aranjuez - Joaquín Rodrigo
15. Carmina Burana - O Fortuna - Carl Orff
16. Moonlight Sonata - Ludwig van Beethoven
