= Stanislav Sokolov =

Russian stop-motion animation director (born 1947)

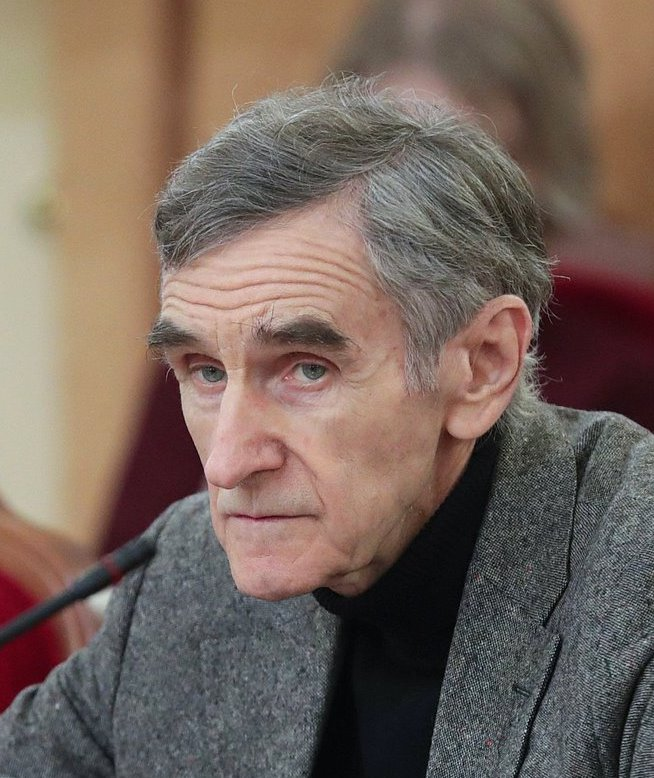
- Sokolov in 2023
- Born: Stanislav Mihaylovich Sokolov; May 18, 1947 (age 77); Russian SFSR, Soviet Union
- Occupation: Animation director

Stanislav Mihaylovich Sokolov (Russian: Станислав Михайлович Соколов; born May 18, 1947) is a Russian stop-motion animation director. He graduated from VGIK in 1971 and has since then worked with Studios Soyuzmultfilm, DEFA, Christmasfilms and S4C. He was awarded a number of prizes for his films, most notably an Emmy in 1992 for his contribution to The Animated Shakespeare series. Sokolov is teaching at VGIK, where he is Professor for Animation and Computer Graphics.

== Filmography ==
- The Guess (1977)
- About Ruff Ruffovich (Про Ерша Ершовича, 1979)
- Der Soldat und der Garten (Солдат и сад, 1980)
- The Homeless Hobgoblings (Бездомные домовые, 1981)
- The Fish Carriage (Рыбья упряжка, 1982)
- Black and White Cinema (Чёрно-белое кино, 1984)
- Falling Shadow (Падающая тень, 1985)
- The Great Underground Ball (Большой подземный бал, 1987)
- The Gold Sword, (Золотая шпага, Zolotaya shpaga, 1990)
- And what's under the mask? (Что там под маской?, 1991)
- Shakespeare: the Animated Tales — The Tempest (Буря, 1992)
- Shakespeare: the Animated Tales — The Winter's Tale (Зимняя сказка, 1994)
- The Miracle Maker (Чудотворец, 1999)
- Our Father (Christian prayer) (Молитва «Отче наш», 2000)
- Alfatitah (Muslim prayer) (Аль-фатиха (Мусульманская молитва), 2001)
- Shema Israel (Jewish prayer) (Шма исраэль (Иудейская молитва), 2003)
- Hoffmaniada (Soyuzmultfilm, being backed by Mikhail Shemyakin) (2018)
