= Chris Grace (broadcaster) =

British broadcaster and film director

- Born: 29 December 1946 (age 79)
- Occupation: Broadcaster

Christopher John Grace (born 29 December 1946), MBE, is a British broadcaster, film director, as well as founder and former CEO of The Shakespeare Schools Festival. In 2000, he was awarded an MBE and a BAFTA Special Award for services to animation.

== Career ==
Grace joined Harlech/HTV in 1969 and helped co-found S4C (Channel Four Wales) in 1981, with responsibility for scheduling the bilingual channel. He was made a bard at the 1983 National Eisteddfod in recognition of his contribution to S4C and the Welsh language. He also started animation commissions for SuperTed, Wil Cwac Cwac, Fireman Sam and The Legend of Lochnagar for S4C. These were sold through S4C International, of which Grace was CEO.

After November 1989, he promoted Russian–Welsh co-productions, featuring abridged works of Shakespeare, opera, Chaucer and the Bible. His films went on to win several BAFTA and Emmy awards as well as received two Academy Award nominations. The Russian–Welsh animated feature film, The Miracle Maker, on the life of Jesus, was shown in the US on ABC television over successive Easters. With Penelope Middleboe and Donald Fry, he co-wrote We Shall Never Surrender, a compendium of diaries from World War II published by Macmillan.

After his resignation, he has been involved with the third sector. In 2000, Grace founded The Shakespeare Schools Festival (SSF) evolving from his 12-part animated Shakespeare series. SSF schools have performed many times in Nos. 10 and 11 Downing Street as well as in both Houses of Parliament and many West End theatres. He stepped down from being the founding CEO in 2016.

Grace currently advises Eastside, an ACE-backed arts-education charity, is a Business Advisor for Young Enterprise, and a Governor of Woolmore Primary School in Tower Hamlets.
