= Slava Polunin =

Russian actor, director and clown

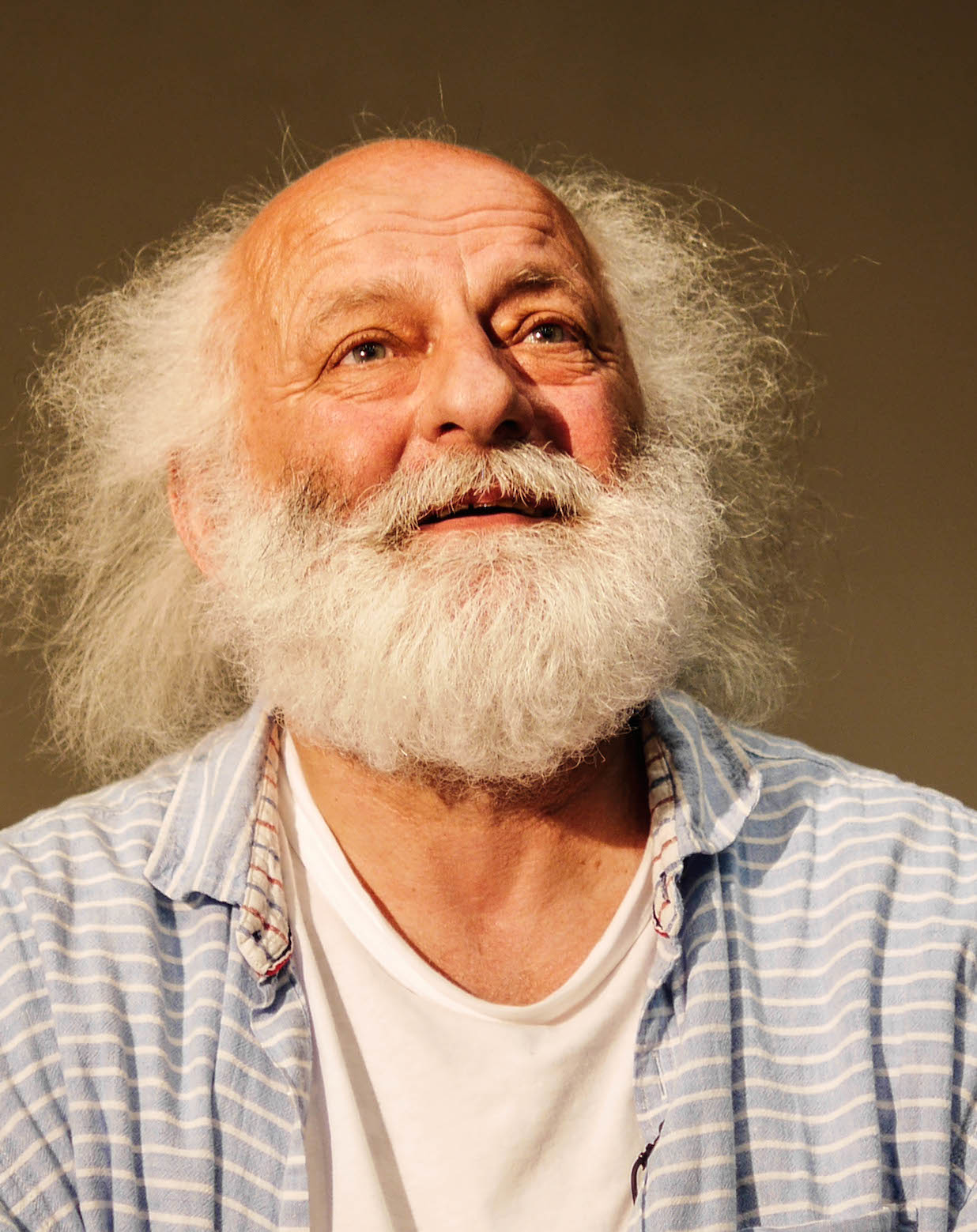
- Polunin, 4 June 2015
- Born: Vyacheslav Ivanovich Polunin; 12 June 1950 (age 76); Novosil, Russ SFSR, Soviet Union
- Occupations: Actor, performance artist
- Years active: 1950–present
- Website: www.slavasnowshow.com

Vyacheslav Ivanovich “Slava” Polunin PAR (Russian: Вячеслав Иванович "Слава" Полунин; born 12 June 1950) is a Russian performance artist and clown. He is the creator of the stage spectacles Asisyai-revue, Slava's Snowshow and Diabolo, as well as the founder of the Academy of Fools.

== Biography ==
=== Early years ===
Polunin was born in the town of Novosil, Oryol Oblast, Russia, into the family of a shop assistant. He was successful in his school theatre, imitating Charlie Chaplin, but was refused entry to the Leningrad Theater Institute due to poor pronunciation. After a few years' study at an engineering school, he graduated from the Leningrad Institute for Soviet Culture, where he later taught.

=== Career ===
In 1967 Polunin joined the Mime Studio at Lensovet Palace of Culture led by Edward Rozinsky, a student of the Leningrad State Institute of Theatre, Music, and Cinema (where he also later taught) at that time. His first success came as a leading performer of pantomime pieces in the show 21 novels about Funny and Serious, created by Rozinsky. In 1980 Slava Polunin created his clown character Asisyai that brought him national fame. Soon after, Slava put together a theater group, Litsedei (Old Russian for "street actors").

In 1981, his first very successful television performance took place on the New Year's Eve program Goluboy Ogonyok (Голубой огонёк). It was a part of his now famous Asisyai-revue.

In 1982, in Leningrad he organized a mime parade in which more than 800 mime artists from the Soviet Union took part. It was an unheard of event featuring semi-underground artists at a time of strict Communist control of all artistic events.

In 1985, during the World Festival of Youth and Students in Moscow he organized a master class of pantomime, attended by many Western mimes.

In 1987, Polunin organized the USSR Festival of Street Theatres (Всесоюзный Фестиваль Уличных Театров); more than 200 participants, including critics and children, lived on an uninhabited island in the Gulf of Finland and made short excursions by boat to the nearby city of Leningrad.

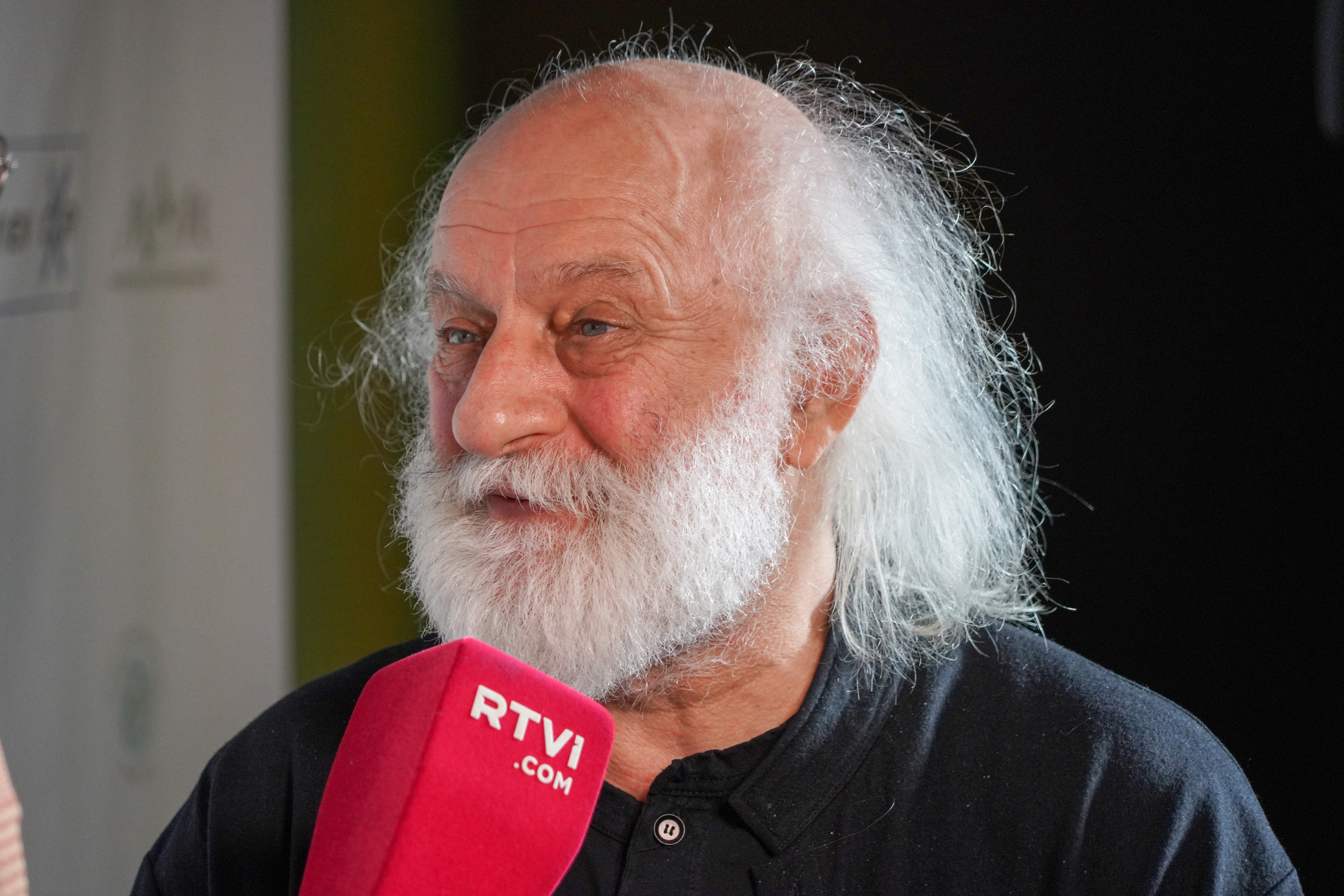
Slava Polunin at Russian Film Week USA in December 2019

By 1988, Licedei had created five highly successful shows: Dreamers (Фантазёры), Eccentrics on the attic (Чурдаки), From the life of insects, Asisyai-revue and Catastrophe. The members decided to celebrate the 20th anniversary of the theater with its funeral. The events included funeral speeches over multiple coffins labeled with the names of the participants, followed by a funeral procession with the coffins through the streets of Leningrad. Then the coffins were set aflame and floated down the Neva river. Despite the theatrical style of the performance, it was indeed the end of the theater. The participants believed Konstantin Stanislavski, who stated that any theater dies after it has existed for 20 years.

In 1989, Polunin organized The Caravan of Peace, in which mimes from different parts of the world were on the road for half a year giving street performances in many European cities. Later, he started the Academy of Fools, the center devoted to the "resurrection of the carnival culture in Russia". The project was started with Polunin's own money, but when the money was spent, the project was frozen. In 1994, Polunin declared that he would make a few commercially successful shows in the West and then return to continue the work of the Academy with the money earned. Among the shows he organized were the highly successful Slava's Snowshow (Снежное шоу) which has been a hit in over 80 countries, and Diabolo devoted to "comical meditation on life, death, and the beauty of the universe". Slava partly attributes the widespread appeal of his performances to the method of pantomime: "You have to be without language for people to understand you everywhere."

He has earned many prestigious awards including Gold Angle (Scotland), Gold Nose (Spain), Triumph (Russia) and the Laurence Olivier Award for Best Entertainment (1998).

Polunin voiced a character in the Russian animated feature film Gofmaniada.

== Selected filmography ==
- Only in Music Hall (1980) — himself
- Believe It or Not (1983) — foreign tsar
- And then Came Bumba... (1984) — clown
- We Are the Clowns (1985) — himself
- Four Clowns Under One Roof (1985) — himself
- How to Become a Star (1986) — himself
- Zero-One (1986) — citizen
- To Kill a Dragon (1988) — aeronaut
- Hello, Fools! (1996) — Jura Kablukov / Auguste Derulen (voice — Andrey Myagkov)
- Clown (2002) — himself; also served as a producer
- Hunchback (2006) — himself (the film wasn't completed)
- Snow Show 3D (2012) — himself
- Signature (2013) — himself
- Marussia (2013) — himself
- Hoffmaniada (2018) — fake pastor (voice)
