= The Miracle Maker (1999 film) =

1999 stop-motion animated film by Derek W. Hayes and Stanislav Sokolov

- DVD cover
- Welsh: Gŵr y Gwyrthiau
- Directed by: Derek W. Hayes; Stanislav Sokolov
- Written by: Murray Watts
- Based on: Life of Jesus in the New Testament, particularly the Gospel of Luke
- Produced by: Naomi Jones; Renat Zinnurov
- Starring: Ralph Fiennes; Julie Christie; Richard E. Grant; Ian Holm; Michael Bryant; Emily Mortimer; Alfred Molina
- Cinematography: Alexander Vikhanski
- Edited by: William Oswald; John Richards
- Music by: Anne Dudley
- Production companies: Icon Entertainment International; Christmas Films; S4C; BBC Films
- Distributed by: Icon Film Distribution (UK)
- Release dates: 26 November 1999 (UK); 31 March 2001 (Russia)
- Running time: 90 min
- Countries: United Kingdom; Russia
- Languages: English; Welsh

The Miracle Maker (Welsh: Gŵr y Gwyrthiau, Russian: Чудотворец, sometimes subtitled The Story of Jesus) is a 1999 stop-motion animated Biblical drama film directed by Derek W. Hayes and Stanislav Sokolov, from a screenplay by Murray Watts. It was a co-production between companies in Wales and Russia, and released in separate English and Welsh-language versions.

The film tells the story of the life of Jesus (voiced by Ralph Fiennes in the English version and Ioan Gruffudd in the Welsh version), from the perspective of secondary characters such as his disciples, the high priests and in particular Tamar, the daughter of Jairus, previously unnamed in the Bible. The voice cast in the English version also features Julie Christie, Richard E. Grant, Ian Holm, Michael Bryant, Emily Mortimer and Alfred Molina.

While the film mainly utilizes stop-motion techniques, hand-drawn animation is used to distinguish flashbacks, parables, visions and spiritual encounters.

== Plot ==
90 years into the Roman Occupation of Judea, Jairus and his sick daughter, Tamar, travel to Sepphoris, where their friend Cleopas says there is a doctor who can help her. While the doctor confides to Jairus her condition is incurable, Tamar witnesses a deranged woman, Mary Magdalene, being defended by Jesus, a carpenter helping build a new synagogue. Afterwards, Jesus leaves Sepphoris and visits his mother, Mary, who recalls his birth, the visit of the Magi and when he conferred with elders at the Temple. Jesus is baptised by John the Baptist in the Jordan River, where he is spoken to by a heavenly voice; his devotion to God is then tested by a demonic being in the wilderness.

Jesus begins preaching in Capernaum, where Tamar and her mother, Rachel, hear him give a Sermon on the Mount and tell the Parable of the Wise and the Foolish Builders. As Jesus's notoriety grows, Judas Iscariot, one of a group of zealots led by Barabbas plotting a revolt over the Romans, believes him to be the Messiah of the Jewish people and leaves the zealots to follow him. The Temple priests, however, question the legitimacy of Jesus's teachings, with priest Ben Azra particularly concerned he could initiate a revolution. Jesus preaches to crowds from aboard the boat of fishermen Simon, John and James, who he leads into making a miraculous catch of fish. Simon subsequently recognizes Jesus as the Messiah and Jesus renames him Simon Peter.

Joined by his new followers, Jesus continues to preach and perform miracles. He frees Mary Magdalene of the demons who possess her, but after forgiving her sins in front of synagogue leaders, Ben Azra and Simon the Pharisee condemn him as being in league with the Devil. When Tamar's illness worsens, Jairus defies the priests' ruling and asks Jesus to help her; Tamar dies before Jesus reaches her, but he encourages her parents to remain faithful and Tamar is revived, healed of her illness. Jesus then mourns for John the Baptist after hearing he has been killed by King Herod, who agrees with Ben Azra that Jesus must be dealt with to prevent Pontius Pilate reporting an uprising against Rome.

Jairus, Rachel, Cleopas, and Tamar join Jesus and his followers as they journey to Jerusalem for Passover. Ben Azra warns high priest Caiaphas of Jesus's growing influence over the Jews, and that he witnessed Jesus raising his friend Lazarus from the dead on his way to Jerusalem, but Caiaphas reasons that Jesus can be disposed of. After arriving in Jerusalem, Jesus throws merchants out of the temple, validates paying taxes to Caesar and predicts his own death, leading Judas to believe him to be a false messiah. Fearing Jesus's actions will lead to further persecution of the Jews by the Romans instead of salvation, Judas offers to help the priests arrest Jesus away from the crowds. Jesus has the Passover meal with his followers, where he tells them he will soon be betrayed and they will abandon him. He then prays in the Garden of Gethsemane, where he is tempted to escape his fate, but instead resolves for God's will to be done. Judas leads the authorities to Jesus, who is arrested while his followers flee.

The priests bring Jesus before Pilate, accusing him of heresy and blasphemy. Pilate finds no case against him, but Caiaphas blackmails him into condemning Jesus to death and Ben Azra has crowds demand Jesus's execution. Jesus is crucified in sight of his followers, who lay his body in a tomb. The day after the sabbath the tomb is found empty, but Mary Magdalane and Simon Peter both appear to see Jesus alive; Thomas doubts their claims and Jairus and Cleopas when they say they met him on the road to Emmaus, until Jesus appears resurrected before him. Jesus gathers all his followers and tells them to give his teachings to the world and that he will always be with them before disappearing.

== Cast ==
=== English ===
- Ralph Fiennes as Jesus
- Michael Bryant as God, Doctor
- Rebecca Callard as Tamar
- Julie Christie as Rachel
- William Hurt as Jairus
- Daniel Massey as Cleopas
- Richard E. Grant as John the Baptist
- Ian Holm as Pontius Pilate
- Anton Lesser as King Herod
- David Schofield as Caiaphas
- Alfred Molina as Simon the Pharisee
- Bob Peck as Joseph of Arimathea
- William Hootkins as Satan
- Ken Stott as Simon Peter
- Miranda Richardson as Mary Magdalene
- David Thewlis as Judas Iscariot
- Emily Mortimer as Mary of Nazareth
- Ewan Stewart as Andrew
- Dougray Scott as John
- James Frain as Thomas
- Robert Duncan as Lazarus
- Julie Higginson as Mary
- Sian Rivers as Martha
- Tim McInnerny as Barabbas
- Antony Sher as Ben Azra
- Lennie James as Tribune Quintilus

=== Welsh ===
- Ioan Gruffudd as Jesus
- Lisa Palfrey as Mary Magdalene
- Sian Rivers as Martha
- Daniel Evans
- Mali Harries
- Matthew Rhys

== Production ==
Production of the film began in 1996 by the Welsh television broadcaster S4C. A decision was made to include along with 3D clay models some 2D hand-drawn sequences, mostly in flashback sequences. Research for the film took place in the Middle East and the United Kingdom and six sets were used simultaneously for over a year.

== Release ==
A Welsh language version premiered on S4C on November 26, 1999, with an English version distributed theatrically by Icon Film Distribution in the UK on 31 March 2000. Opening in 100 cinemas, it grossed £153,408 in its opening weekend. The film was also released theatrically in France, Italy, Spain, Sweden and Poland as well as the US, following the premiere on ABC on April 23, 2000. Artisan Entertainment, and later Lionsgate, held the home video rights.

== Reception ==
The Miracle Maker received positive critical response, Antonia Quirke of The Independent calling it "a powerfully engaging film, one that correctly sees the gospels as spiritual autobiography, and Jesus's skill with parables as an art both fundamental and devastating." Peter Bradshaw of The Guardian criticised the film, calling it "plodding" and that it "patronises and talks down to its audience outrageously, like a schools television drama." The Observer's Philip French wrote the story "would baffle anyone coming to it for the first time".

Steven D. Greydanus of the National Catholic Register praised it, saying "no other Jesus movie I've seen is so well-grounded in the historical, cultural, political, religious and even economic realities of Jesus' day, or in the religious conflict between Jesus and the Jewish authorities. From Jewish-Roman tensions to diverse groups within Judaism — Pharisees, Sadducees and Zealots; priests and local religious leaders, working-class Jews, despised tax collectors and other 'sinners,' hated Samaritans, and even more marginal figures like 'Mad Mary' Magdalene — Murray Watts' astonishingly deft screenplay efficiently sketches the lines between all these groups. And then it demonstrates how easily Jesus crosses those lines, to the discomfort of all around him, his disciples included."

Den of Geek listed it at #1 on a listicle of "25 Best Bible Movies About Jesus Christ to Watch For Easter," Rebecca Clough writing "For a children's film, there's an astonishing amount of intelligent insight into characters' feelings and motivations. It's also beautifully made, moving, and funny."

== See also ==
- List of animated feature films
- List of stop-motion films
- List of Easter films
