= Shakespeare Schools Foundation =

Education charity

Coram Shakespeare Schools Foundation
- Abbreviation: SSF
- Formation: 2000; 26 years ago
- Founder: Chris Grace
- Type: Cultural education charity
- Region served: United Kingdom
- Website: www.shakespeareschools.org
- Formerly called: Shakespeare Schools Festival

The Coram Shakespeare Schools Foundation (SSF) is an educational charity operating throughout the United Kingdom, including Northern Ireland. The foundation organises an annual youth drama festival, involving 30,000 young people. Since 2000, the SSF has worked with over 300,000 students and their teachers.

== History ==
The Shakespeare Schools Festival was founded by Chris Grace in 2000. In 2016, it was rebranded as the Shakespeare Schools Foundation and, to mark the 400th anniversary of Shakespeare's death, it staged performances at 10 Downing Street, Westminster Abbey, a West End Gala, and at Queen Elizabeth II's 90th birthday. The SSF also hosted the "Trial of Hamlet" fundraiser.

In 2018, the Foundation was awarded the Praemium Imperiale Grant for Young Artists, having been selected for the award by the Chancellor of the University of Oxford and former Chairman of the BBC Trust, Chris Patten. In April 2018, the SSF hosted another West End fundraiser, "Trial of Richard III", at the Novello Theatre. The cast included Hugh Dennis, David Oakes, Kae Alexander, Lady Justice Hallett, Ian Winter QC, and John Kelsey Fry QC, with contributions from Ed Vaizey MP, Maggie Aderin Pocock, and Tim Campbell.

In 2020, the Shakespeare Schools Foundation (SSF) merged with the Coram Group, rebranding as the Coram Shakespeare Schools Foundation (CSSF). The CSSF introduced the Shakespeare Schools Film Festival in 2023 in collaboration with Into Film.

During the 2023–2024 period, more than 10,000 students from schools across the UK participated in various programmes.

== Workshops and curriculum resources ==
The SSF has developed a range of curriculum resources for teachers based on the National Curriculums of England, Wales, Scotland, and Northern Ireland. The foundation also offers standalone workshops for students, teachers, and businesses.
