= Rosalind (As You Like It) =

Character in As You Like It

- As You Like It character
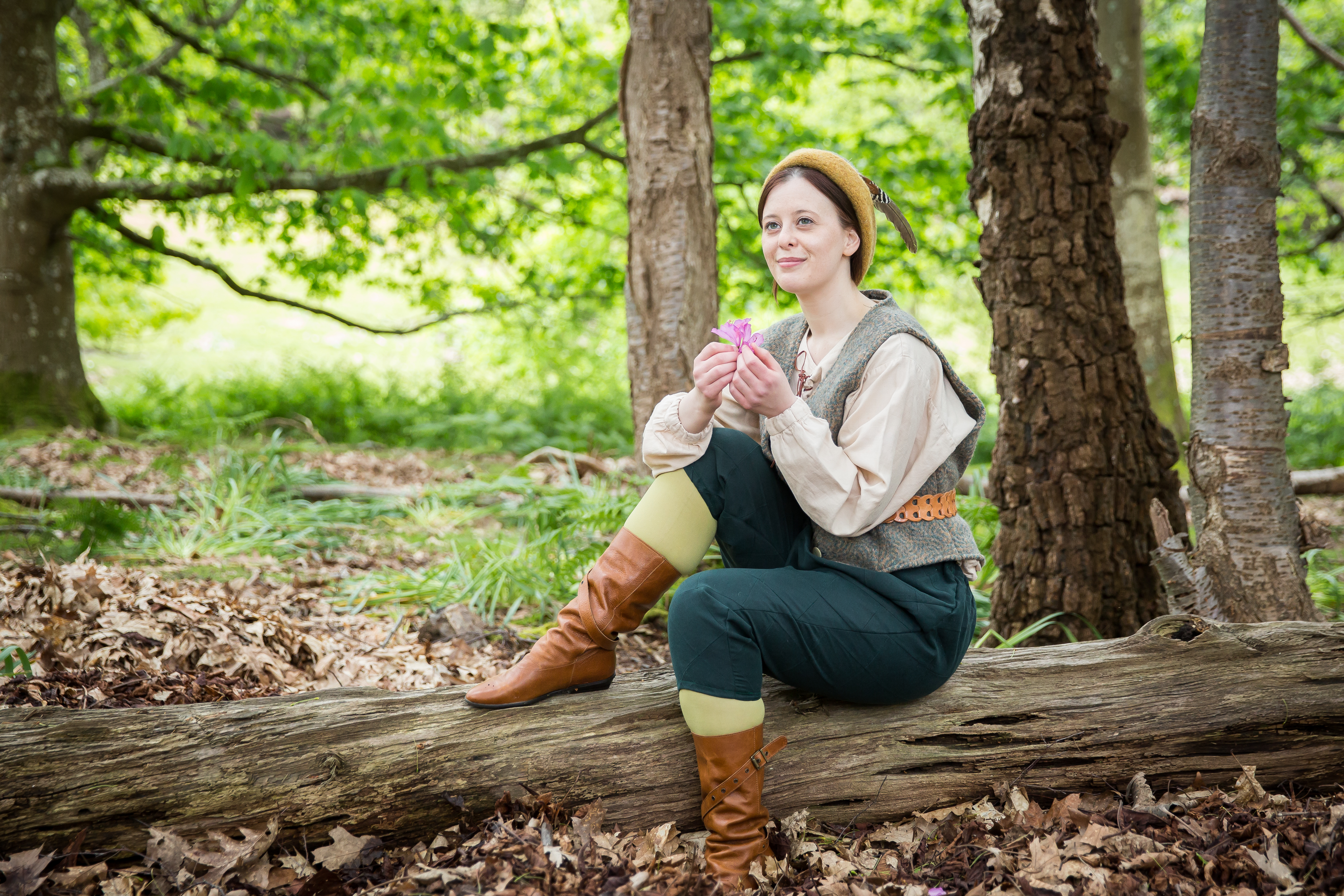
- Rosalind in a modern production
- Created by: William Shakespeare
- Based on: Character in source book, 'Rosalynde' (1590) by Thomas Lodge Jr. Also Rosalinde Spenser in The Shepheardes Calender by Edmund Spenser (1579).

In-universe information
- Aliases: Ganymede, after the mythological figure
- Affiliation: Duke Senior, her father
- Family: Orlando (husband); Duke Senior (father); Duke Frederick (uncle); Celia (cousin)

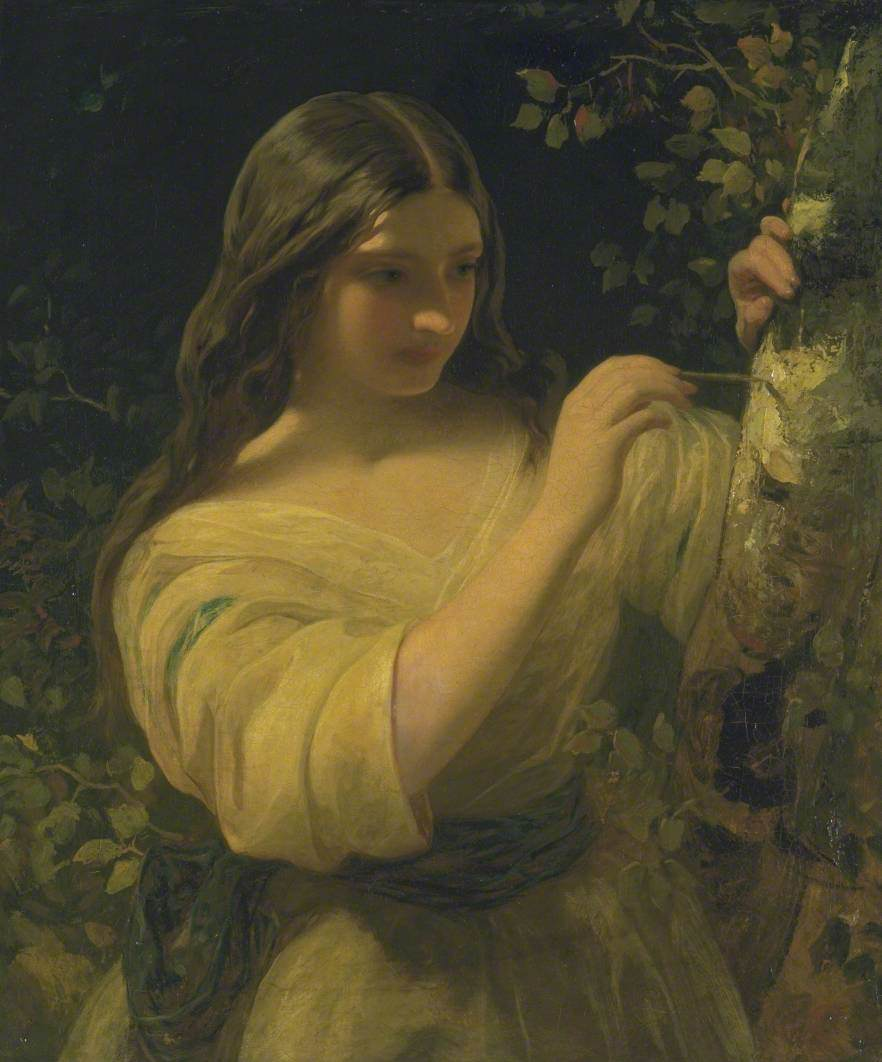
Rosalind by James Sant (Tate Britain)

Rosalind is the heroine and protagonist of the play As You Like It (1600) by William Shakespeare. In the play, she disguises herself as a male shepherd named Ganymede. Many actors have portrayed Rosalind, including Julie Marlowe, Maggie Smith, Elisabeth Bergner, Vanessa Redgrave, Helena Bonham Carter, Helen Mirren, Patti LuPone, Helen McCrory, Bryce Dallas Howard, Adrian Lester and Sarah Wayne Callies.

== Origins ==
Rosalynde is the heroine of Thomas Lodge's Euphues' Golden Legacy. The Victorian critic George Fletcher wrote: “'Faire Rosalind' had, however, at this time, acquired a fresh poetic fame as the object of Spenser's attachment, celebrated in his Shephearde's Calendar, 1579, and Colin Clouts Come Home Againe, 1595. Of all the sweet feminine names compounded from Rosa, that of Rosa-linda seems to be the most elegant, and therefore most befitting that particular character of ideal beauty which the dramatist here assigns to his imaginary princess.”

Ganymede, the name she assumes in her disguise as a forest youth, is that of 'Jove's own page' (I, iii, 127), the most beautiful of all mortals, son of Tros and Callirrhoe, chosen by Jupiter to be his cup-bearer, and to dwell among the gods as his chosen servant.

In 1905, Spenser scholar Percy Long identified Elizabeth North, the daughter of translator Thomas North, as the likely inspiration for the character Rosalinde in Edmund Spenser's Shepheardes Calendar. Long's identification is based partly on Spenser's explicit statement that "Rosalinde" is an anagram of this person's real name. "Rosalinde" rearranged is "Elisa Nord": Elisa being a common shortened version of Elizabeth, and Nord being French for "North". The young North was living with her powerful uncle, Roger North, 2nd Baron North, at his estate of Kirtling Tower around the time Spenser was first writing his first major poetic work and it is likely that Spenser met Elisa at festivities hosted there. Most scholars agree that As You Like It's Rosalind and Spenser's Rosalinde share a direct literary lineage, whether immediately or via Thomas Lodge's prose romance 'Rosalynde'. Though there are many commonalities between the literary Rosalindes and the real-life Elisabeth North, and Thomas North's possible involvement in the Shakespearean canon has recently seen some academic support, this remains a controversial position.

== Role in the play ==
Rosalind is the heroine and the daughter of the exiled Duke Senior and niece to his usurping brother, Duke Frederick. Her father is banished from the kingdom, breaking her heart. She then meets Orlando, one of her father's friends' sons and falls in love with him. After angering her uncle, she leaves his court for exile in the Forest of Arden. Disguised as a shepherd named Ganymede, Rosalind lives with her sweet and devoted cousin, Celia (who is disguised as Ganymede's sister, Aliena), and Duke Frederick's fool Touchstone. Eventually, Rosalind is reunited with her father and married to her faithful lover, Orlando.

== Analysis ==
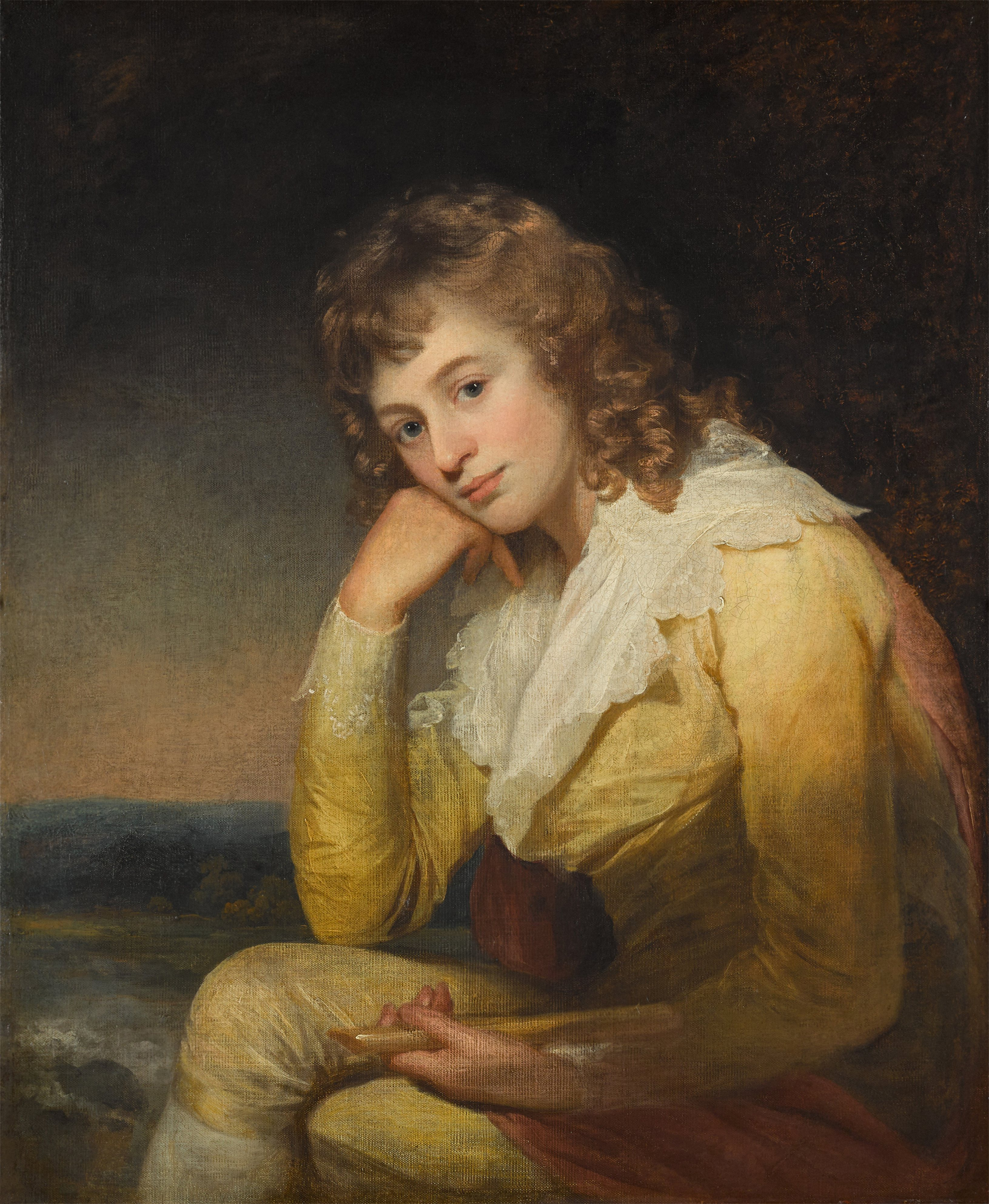
Dorothea Jordan as Rosalind by William Beechey, 1787. Painting of the Irish actress Dorothea Jordan in the role.

Rosalind is one of Shakespeare's most recognized heroines. Generally noted for her resilience, quick wit, and beauty, Rosalind is a vital character in As You Like It. Most commonly seen next to her beloved cousin Celia, Rosalind is also a faithful friend, leader, and schemer. She stays true to her family and friends throughout the entire story, no matter how dangerous the consequences are. Rosalind dominates the stage. Her true decision-making skills can be seen in the last scene of Act V (5) where she has to present herself as Rosalind to her father and to Orlando, but at the same time change Phebe's opinion to marry Silvius. She is the main character of the play who extracts the clarity of important traits in other characters.

=== Gender conventions ===
In As you like it : Shakespeare's unruly women, Penny Gay analyses Rosalind's character in the framework of gender conventions that ascribe femininity with qualities such as “graciousness, warmth … [and] tenderness”. However, Rosalind's demanding tone towards Orlando contradicts these conventions. She rejects these stereotypes of femininity believing that “the wiser [the woman is], the waywarder” she is. By claiming that women who are wild are smarter than those who are not, Rosalind often refutes the perception of women as passive in their pursuit of men. In the book A Feminist Companion to Shakespeare, Carol T. Neely supports this by mentioning that through her actions, Rosalind often adopts stereotypical “masculine behavior,” such as “initiating conversations” and “arranging marriages”.

== Performance history ==
=== Theatre ===
Vanessa Redgrave rose to fame playing Rosalind in 1960 with the Royal Shakespeare Company. American actress Patti LuPone played the role at the Guthrie Theatre in Minneapolis, after her award-winning portrayal of Eva Peron in the original Broadway run of Evita. This caused much speculation because LuPone was leaving the Broadway stage and moving to "regional" work. In 2009, Melissa Benoist portrayed Rosalind while attending Marymount Manhattan College.

Adrian Lester won a Time Out Award for his performance as Rosalind in Cheek by Jowl's 1991 production of As You Like It. A male actor in the role (as would have been the norm in Shakespeare's time) underlines the confusion of gender roles within the play: at one point, a male actor is playing a woman who is pretending to be a man acting the part of a woman.

Helen McCrory played Rosalind in 2005 at Wyndham's Theatre in London under the direction of David Lan. In 2009, Naomi Frederick portrayed Rosalind at Shakespeare's Globe.

=== Television ===
Helen Mirren played Rosalind in the 1978 BBC Television Shakespeare version of the play directed by Basil Coleman. In Shakespeare: The Animated Tales' 1994 adaptation of As You Like It, Sylvestra Le Touzel voiced Rosalind.

=== Film ===
Rosalind has been played by various notable actresses on film including Rose Coghlan in 1912, Elisabeth Bergner in a 1936 film opposite Laurence Olivier as Orlando, Emma Croft in 1992, and Bryce Dallas Howard in the 2006 production directed by Kenneth Branagh. Branagh felt that the character of Rosalind talked too much in the original play and thus cut many of Rosalind's lines in his Japan-set adaptation. Howard was nominated for a Golden Globe for her performance as Rosalind.

=== Other adaptations ===
Helena Bonham Carter portrayed Rosalind in the 2000 BBC Radio 4 version of As You Like It.
