= Orlando (As You Like It) =

Character in As You Like It

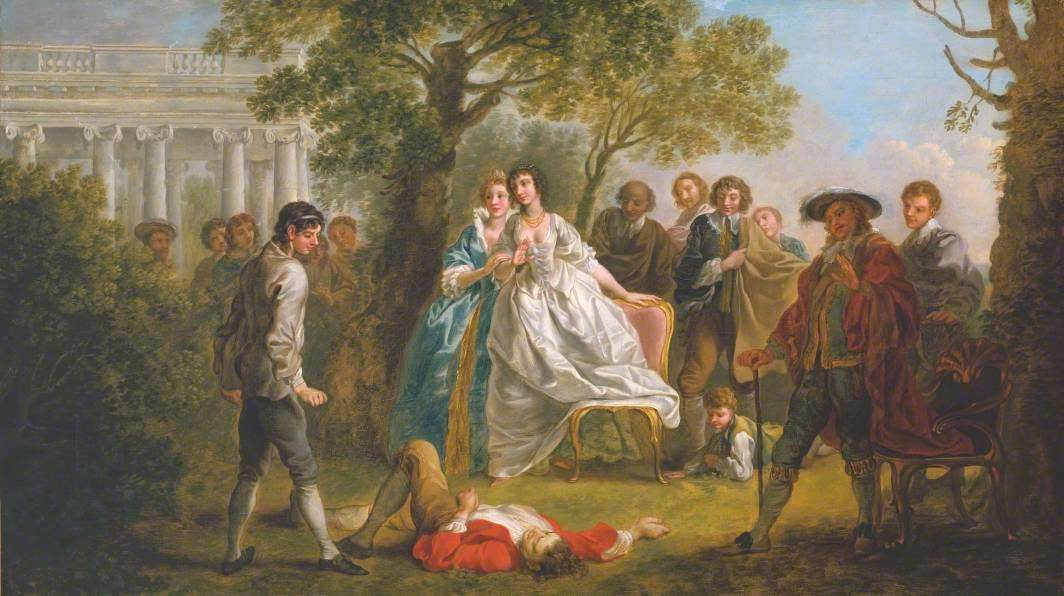
Francis Hayman, The Wrestling Scene from As You Like It, Tate, 1740-42

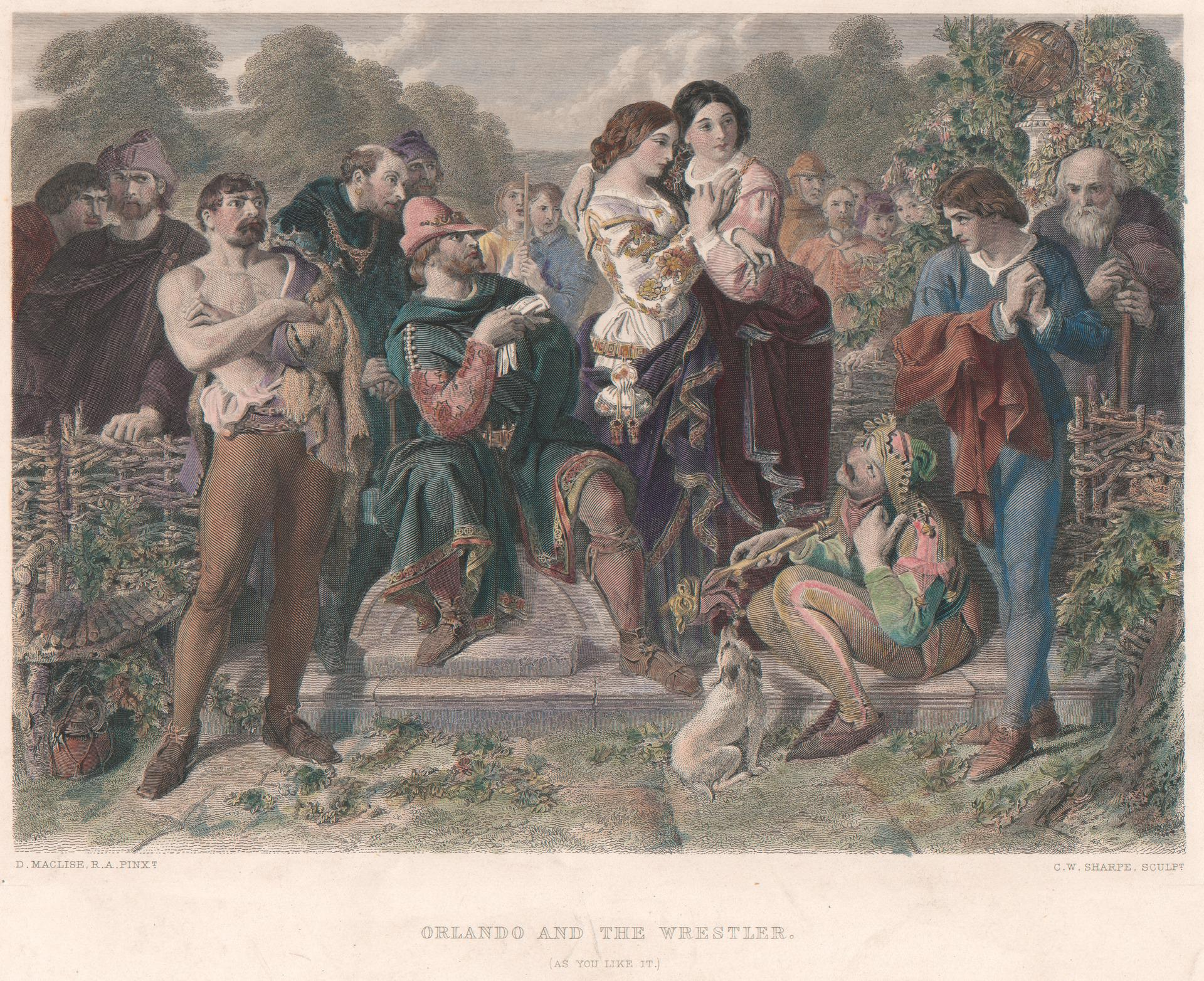
Orlando at the Wrestling Match, Charles W Sharpe

Orlando is a fictional character and is the male lead in the comedy As You Like It (1599/1600) by William Shakespeare. Orlando is the third and youngest son of the deceased Old Sir Rowland de Bois, and carries a name which is the Italian version of the name "Rowland", born by his recently deceased father.

Orlando's eldest brother, Oliver mistreats Orlando by only allowing him an inheritance of 1,000 crowns. Orlando believes he should be learning how to act as a gentleman, but his brother keeps him "rustically at home". Despite this treatment and lack of education, Orlando is often characterised as brave, chivalrous, tender, modest, smart, strong, and handsome. He resents the harsh treatment he receives at Oliver's hands and laments how Oliver has denied him an education and the money he is rightfully owed.

Orlando is the love interest of Rosalind, who has also been mistreated by circumstance. Orlando and Rosalind meet after Orlando defeats a wrestler named Charles in a public match. Orlando communicates his love to Rosalind before he escapes to the Forest of Arden with his servant Adam.

While in Arden, he is accepted into the circle of the usurped Duke Senior and writes poems on trees to Rosalind. When Rosalind sees these poems she strikes up a relationship with him as Ganymede, and the two act out a relationship between Orlando and Rosalind under the guise that it will cure Orlando of his love for her. At the conclusion of the play he is married to Rosalind and reinstated in his wealth and station.

The city of Orlando, Florida, is widely believed to have been named for the character of Orlando.

== Sources ==
Like most of the characters in As You Like It, the character of Orlando is largely derived from Thomas Lodge's 1590 prose tale Rosalynde: Euphues Golden Legacy, Found After His Death In His Cell At Silexedra. In that story Sir John of Bordeaux bequeathes his youngest son, Rosader, his horse, armor, lance and sixteen ploughlands. According to his final will, he only bequeaths his oldest son, Saladyne, fourteen ploughlands. Saladyne's jealous impacts the execution of the father's final will and the tension between the two brothers is as central to the narrative of Rosalynde as it is to As You Like It.

Additionally, Orlando's situation in the play has been linked by some critics, including Andrew Barnaby, with the parable of the Prodigal Son. Under this reading, Oliver is cast as the Prodigal Son who inherits wealth but does not use it properly while Orlando is cast as the dutiful son left to suffer.

== Relationships ==
=== Relationship with Oliver ===
Orlando begins the play by describing his relationship to his to Oliver, his eldest brother. Orlando believes Oliver has prevented him from receiving his inheritance. Orlando and Oliver have a physical altercation, though the text is unclear who initiates the violence. Oliver confirms his hatred of Orlando in a soliloquy concluding Act 1 Scene 1. Oliver conspires to have Orlando killed in a wrestling match with Charles, but Orlando defeats Charles and then, fearing for his safety, escapes to Arden Forrest.

While in Arden, Orlando evolves and learns how to control his violent impulses.

In Act 4, under the direction of Duke Frederick, Oliver pursues Orlando into the forest and falls asleep under a tree. There he is attacked by both a snake and a lion. Orlando, seeing his brother in mortal danger, fights off the animals. Orlando uses his skill as a fighter to protect rather than injure Oliver, his enemy. Orlando's act of bravery transforms Oliver. In Act 5 the converted Oliver marries Celia and he transfers their father's estate to Orlando.

==== Relationship with Rosalind ====
At the start of the play Oliver prevents Orlando from an education at court. To circumvent this isolation, he appears as a challenger to the court wrestler, Charles. It is here that Orlando first meets Rosalind. She urges him not to fight by telling him that his "reputation shall not.. be misprized". Orlando fights anyway, and the two meet again after the match. Orlando becomes speechless when Rosalind gives him a necklace, and Rosalind tells Celia she has fallen in love with him. After this Orlando escapes to the Forest of Arden while Rosalind is banished to that same location.

While in Arden, Orlando writes love poetry to Rosalind on a tree. In doing so, Orlando participates in a poetic tradition, often associated with Petrarch, in which a male poet idealizes a beloved woman. Celia, Touchstone and Rosalind all note Orlando's lack of poetic skill with Rosalind even calling it "tedious".

When Rosalind, dressed as Ganymede, confronts Orlando in the forest she promises she can cure his love sickness. She instructs Orlando to visit her (still dressed as Ganymede) daily and she will perform as Rosalind. By acting "proud, fantastical, apish, shallow, inconstant, full of tears, full of smiles, for every passion something and for no passion truly any thing" she says she will cure Orlando of his lovesickness. Many critics, notably Marjorie Garber, have noted that, rather than cure him, she actually instructs him on how to overcome his idealized fantasy of Rosalind and learn to love someone with flaws.

Garber sees Rosalind as instructing Orland through “three distinct stages in Orlando’s development as a lover”. First, she helps him overcome is initial speechlessness. Then she teaches him to abandon a solipsistic notion of love that centers his own pain and perform "acts of constancy". Then, near the end of the play, she helps him mature toward an "other-directedness".

== Interpretations and performance history ==
=== Interpretations ===
Critics have mostly understood Orlando to be sympathetic. Katherine Duncan-Jones notes that he is "a thoroughly likeable and good-natured young man" and Louis Adrian Montrose describes Orlando's character arch as one "from an impoverished and powerless adolescence" to on the "threshold manhood and marriage". In these cases, the assumption is that the audience sympathizes with Orlando from the start of the play.

However, Chris Fitter has pushed back on this assumption. He notes that Orlando complains about his given inheritance of £250, about £125,000 in labor value today, which would make him unsympathetic to Shakespeare's contemporary audience which would have included unskilled workers who made £7 per year.

=== Performance ===
Many well known actors have played the role of Orlando such as Laurence Olivier, who played the character in a 1936 film adaptation of the play with Elisabeth Bergner opposite him as Rosalind. In that same year, 1936, Michael Redgrave performed the role at the Old Vic. In Kenneth Branagh's 2006 adaptation, David Oyelowo played the part of Orlando.
