= Touchstone (As You Like It) =

Character in As You Like It

- As You Like It character
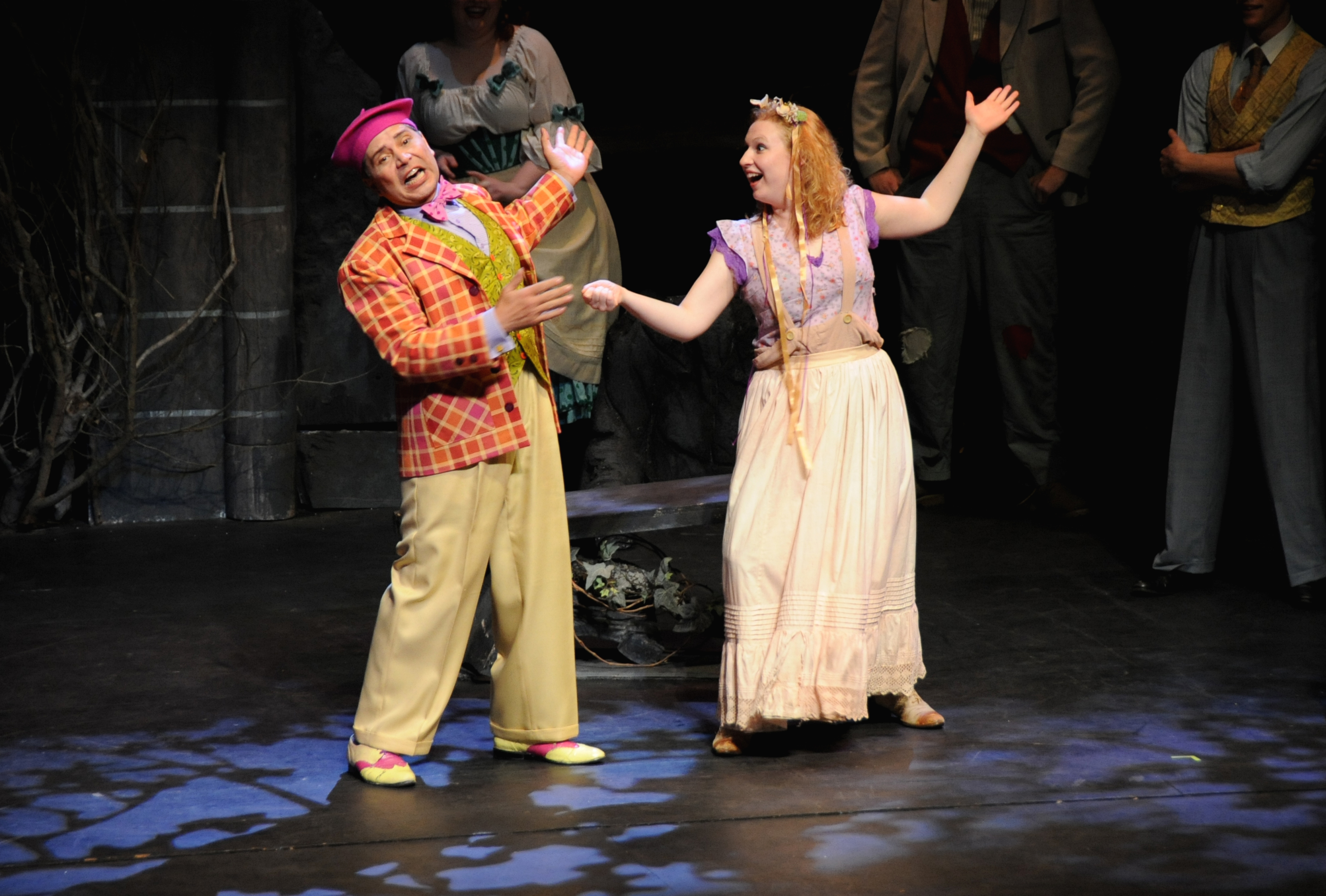
- "The fool doth think he is wise, but the wise man knows himself to be a fool"
- Created by: William Shakespeare
- Portrayed by: Robert Armin

In-universe information
- Affiliation: Duke Frederick
- Family: Audrey (spouse)

Touchstone is a fictional character in Shakespeare's play As You Like It. He is a court Jester, he was used throughout the play to both provide comic relief through sometimes vulgar humor and contrarily share wisdom, fitting the archetype of the Shakespearean fool. Oftentimes, he acts as a character who foils his surroundings, observing and mocking the events and characters of the play.

== Role in the play ==
Touchstone is the court jester of Duke Frederick the usurper's court. Throughout the play he comments on the other characters and thus contributes to a better understanding of the play. Touchstone falls in love with a dull-witted goat girl named Audrey. William, an oafish country boy, makes clumsy attempts to woo her as well, but is driven off by Touchstone, who threatens to kill him "a hundred and fifty ways". Eventually Touchstone marries Audrey, but a prediction is made that the relationship will not last. Audrey does not love Touchstone in the real sense of the feeling but only to become a courtly lady. She is a rustic countrywoman. Touchstone is not a self-centered and selfish man, as is shown when he is willing to follow Celia, daughter of Duke Frederick, into the forest of Arden for the simple reason as to be a comfort on the journey and as a security too.

Touchstone is thought to be a witty or clever fool, although Rosalind and Celia jokingly say that he is a "natural" fool ("Fortune makes Nature's natural the cutter-off of Nature's wit" and "hath sent this natural for our whetstone"). Often he tries to show off his wit and intelligence by making some wise comments and references.

Touchstone compares himself to Ovid and Jaques likens him to Jove in Ovid's Metamorphoses. The word "touchstone" appears in Book II of the second 1575 edition of Arthur Golding's translation of this work, in which Mercury tricks Battus into revealing the whereabouts of the cattle of Apollo which Mercury himself has stolen and punishes Battus by turning him into a touchstone.

David Wiles suggests that Robert Armin played the part of Touchstone in the first productions of As You Like It. The addition of Armin to the Chamberlain's Men in 1599 and the character of Touchstone marked the beginning of a series of court fool characters; these characters differed greatly from earlier Shakespearean fools, typically played by William Kempe, because their humour is mainly derived from the fool's wit and intellect. The earlier fools of this period were often nothing but stooges.
