= E. T. A. Hoffmann bibliography =

This is a chronological list of works by E. T. A. Hoffmann.

== 1809–1825 ==
=== 1809 ===
- "Ritter Gluck ['Chevalier Gluck']" (1st ed. 1809; final ed. 1819)
  First appeared with the byline "– – – – nn" in the Allgemeine Musikalische Zeitung, vol. 11, no. 20 (Leipzig: Breitkopf & Härtel, February 15, 1809); subsequently included in the Fantasiestücke, vol. 1, 1st ed. (1814) and 2nd ed. (1819) (Mazza 1996: 778).

=== 1810 ===
- "Sinfonie pour 2 Violons, 2 Violes, Violoncelle et Contre-Violon, 2 Flûtes, petite Flûte, 2 Hautbois, 2 Clarinettes, 2 Bassons, Contrebasson, 2 Cors, 2 Trompettes, Timbales et 3 Trompes, composée et dédiée etc par Louis van Beethoven. à Leipsic, chez Breitkopf et Härtel. Oeuvre 67. No. 5. des Sinfonies. (Pr. 4 Rthlr. 12 Gr.)" (1st ed. 1810; final ed. 1819)
  Review of Beethoven's Symphony No. 5 in C minor, Op. 67 (1808) that first appeared anonymously in the Allgemeine Musikalische Zeitung, vol. 12, no. 40–41 (Leipzig: Breitkopf & Härtel, July 4, 1810, and July 11, 1810); subsequently incorporated into the essay "Beethoven's Instrumental-Musik" (1813), which was then included as one of the "Kreisleriana" in the Fantasiestücke, vol. 1, 1st ed. (1814) and 2nd ed. (1819) (Schnapp 1963: 437).
- "Johannes Kreislers, des Kapellmeisters, musikalische Leiden ['The Musical Sufferings of Johannes Kreisler, Music Director']" (1st ed. 1810; final ed. 1819)
  First appeared anonymously in the Allgemeine Musikalische Zeitung, vol. 12, no. 52 (Leipzig: Breitkopf & Härtel, September 26, 1810); subsequently included as one of the "Kreisleriana" in the Fantasiestücke, vol. 1, 1st ed. (1814) and 2nd ed. (1819) (Mazza 1996: 778).

=== 1811 ===
This chronological listing is still under development. Please be patient.

=== 1812 ===
- "Des Kapellmeisters, Johannes Kreislers, Dissertatiuncula über den hohen Werth der Musik ['The Musik Director Johannes Kreisler's Comments on the High Value of Music']" (1st ed. 1812; final ed. 1819)
  First appeared anonymously in the Allgemeine Musikalische Zeitung, vol. 14 (Leipzig: Breitkopf & Härtel, July 29, 1812); subsequently included as one of the "Kreisleriana" under the title "Gedanken über den hohen Wert der Musik" in the Fantasiestücke, vol. 1, 1st ed. (1814) and 2nd ed. (1819).

=== 1813 ===
- "Deux Trios pour Pianoforte, Violon et Violoncelle, comp. et déd. à Mad. la Comtesse Marie d'Erdödy – – par Louis van Beethoven. Oeuvr. 70. à Leipsic, chez Breitkopf et Härtel. No. 1. (Pr. 1 Thlr. 12 Gr.) No. 2. (2 Thlr.)" (1st ed. 1813; final ed. 1819)
  Review of Beethoven's Piano Trio No. 5 in D Major, Op. 70, No. 1 (1808) and Piano Trio No. 6 in E-flat Major, Op. 70, No. 2 (1808) that first appeared anonymously in the Allgemeine Musikalische Zeitung, vol. 15, no. 9 (Leipzig: Breitkopf & Härtel, March 3, 1813); subsequently incorporated into the essay "Beethoven's Instrumental-Musik" (1813), which was then included as one of the "Kreisleriana" in the Fantasiestücke, vol. 1, 1st ed. (1814) and 2nd ed. (1819).
- "Don Juan" (1st ed. 1813; final ed. 1819)
  First appeared anonymously in the Allgemeine Musikalische Zeitung, vol. 15, no. 13 (Leipzig: Breitkopf & Härtel, March 31, 1813); subsequently included in the Fantasiestücke, vol. 1, 1st ed. (1814) and 2nd ed. (1819).
- "Der Dichter und der Komponist ['The Poet and the Composer']" (comp. 1813; 1st ed. 1813; final ed. 1819)
  Composed in September and October 1813 (Segebrecht 1963: 1045), this essay first appeared anonymously in the Allgemeine Musikalische Zeitung, vol. 15, no. 49 and 50 (Leipzig: Breitkopf & Härtel, December 8, 1813 – December 15, 1813). It was subsequently included in Die Serapions-Brüder, vol. 1 (1819) (Müller-Seidel 1963: [1155]).
- "Beethovens Instrumentalmusik ['Beethoven's Instrumental Music']" (1st ed. 1813; final ed. 1819)
  Reworking of Hoffmann's "Sinfonie pour 2 Violons, [. . .]" (1810) and "Deux Trios pour Pianoforte, [. . .]" (1813), reviews of Beethoven's Symphony No. 5 in C minor, Op. 67 (1808) and his Piano Trio No. 5 in D Major, Op. 70, No. 1 (1808) and Piano Trio No. 6 in E-flat Major, Op. 70, No. 2 (1808), respectively, that first appeared anonymously in the Zeitung für die elegante Welt, vol. 13, no. 245–247 (December 9, 1813 – December 11, 1813) and was subsequently included as one of the "Kreisleriana" in the Fantasiestücke, vol. 1, 1st ed. (1814) and 2nd ed. (1819).

=== 1814 ===
- "Briefe des Baron Wallborn an den Kapellmeister Johannes Kreisler und des Kapellmeisters Johannes Kreisler an den Baron Wallborn ['Letters from Baron Wallborn to Music Director Johannes Kreisler and from Music Director Johannes Kreisler to Baron Wallborn']" (1st ed. 1814; final ed. 1819)
  First appeared with a foreword by la Motte Fouqué and Hoffmann in Die Musen, vol. 3 (1814), ed. Baron Friedrich de la Motte Fouqué and Wilhelm Neumann; subsequently divided into two pieces, "Brief des Barons Wallborn an den Kapellmeister Kreisler" (1814) and "Brief des Kapellmeisters Kreisler an den Baron Wallborn" (1814), and included as two of the "Kreisleriana" in the Fantasiestücke, 1st ed., vol. 4 (1815), and 2nd ed., vol. 2 (1819).
- "Höchst zerstreute Gedanken ['Highly Scattered Thoughts']" (1st ed. 1814; final ed. 1819)
  First appeared with the byline "vom Kapellmeister J. Kreisler ['by Music Director J. Kreisler']" in the Zeitung für die elegante Welt, vol. 14, no. 2–5 (January 4, 1814 – January 8, 1814); subsequently included as one of the "Kreisleriana" in the Fantasiestücke, vol. 1, 1st ed. (1814) and 2nd ed. (1819).
- "Nachricht von einem gebildeten jungen Mann ['News of an Educated Young Man']" (1st ed. 1814; final ed. 1819)
  First appeared with the byline "aus den Papieren des Kapellmeisters, Johannes Kreisler ['from the papers of the Music Director Johannes Kreisler']" in the Allgemeine Musikalische Zeitung, vol. 16, no. 11 (Leipzig: Breitkopf & Härtel, March 16, 1814); subsequently included as one of the "Kreisleriana" in the Fantasiestücke, 1st ed., vol. 4 (1815), and 2nd ed., vol. 2 (1819).
- "Der Musikfeind ['The Enemy of Music']" (1st ed. 1814; final ed. 1819)
  First appeared anonymously in the Allgemeine Musikalische Zeitung, vol. 16, no. 22 (Leipzig: Breitkopf & Härtel, June 1, 1814); subsequently included as one of the "Kreisleriana" in the Fantasiestücke, 1st ed., vol. 4 (1815), and 2nd ed., vol. 2 (1819).
- "Über einen Ausspruch Sacchinis, und über den sogenannten Effect in der Musik ['On an Remark of Sacchini's, and on So-Called Effect in Music']" (1st ed. 1814; final ed. 1819)
  First appeared anonymously in the Allgemeine Musikalische Zeitung, vol. 16, no. 29 (Leipzig: Breitkopf & Härtel, July 20, 1814); subsequently included as one of the "Kreisleriana" in the Fantasiestücke, 1st ed., vol. 4 (1815), and 2nd ed., vol. 2 (1819).
- Fantasiestücke in Callots Manier [Fantasy Pieces in the Manner of Callot or Fantasias in Callot's Style] (1st ed., 4 vol., 1814–1815; 2nd and final ed., 2 vol., 1819)
  - Vol. 1 (1814)
    - Preface by Jean Paul Friedrich Richter (1814)
    - "Jacques Callot" (1814)
    - "Ritter Gluck" (1809)
    - "Kreisleriana Nro. 1–6" (1814)
      - 1. "Johannes Kreislers, des Kapellmeisters, musikalische Leiden" (1810)
      - 2. "Ombra adorata!" (1814)
      - 3. "Gedanken über den hohen Wert der Musik ['Thoughts on the Great Worth of Music']" (1812)
      - 4. "Beethovens Instrumental-Musik" (1813)
      - 5. "Höchst zerstreute Gedanken" (1814)
      - 6. "Der vollkommene Machinist ['The Complete (Theater) Machinist']" (1814)
    - "Don Juan" (1813)
  - Vol. 2 (1814)
    - "Nachricht von den neuesten Schicksalen des Hundes Berganza ['News of the Latest Fortunes of the Hound Berganza']" (1814)
    - "Der Magnetiseur ['The Animal Magnetist' or 'The Hypnotist']" (1814)
  - Vol. 3 (1814)
    - Der goldene Topf: Ein Märchen aus der neuen Zeit [The Golden Pot: A Fairytale of Modern Times] (1814)
  - Vol. 4 (1815)
    - "Die Abenteuer der Silvester-Nacht ['The Adventures of New Year's Eve']" (1815)
    - "Kreisleriana" (1815)
      - 1. "Brief des Barons Wallborn an den Kapellmeister Kreisler ['Baron Wallborn's Letter to Music Director Kreisler']" (1814)
      - 2. "Brief des Kapellmeisters Kreisler an den Baron Wallborn ['Music Director Kreisler's Letter to Baron Wallborn']" (1814)
      - 3. "Kreislers musikalisch-poetischer Klub ['Kreisler's Musical-Poetical Club']" (1815)
      - 4. "Nachricht von einem gebildeten jungen Mann" (1814)
      - 5. "Der Musikfeind ['The Enemy of Music']" (1814)
      - 6. "Über einen Ausspruch Sacchinis, und über den sogenannten Effect in der Musik" (1814)
      - 7. "Johannes Kreislers Lehrbrief ['Johannes Kreisler's Indenture']" (1815)

=== 1815 ===
- "Die Fermate ['The Cadenza']" (comp. 1815; 1st ed. 1815; final ed. 1819)
  Composed in January and February 1815 (Segebrecht 1963: 1043), this piece first appeared with the byline "Erzählung von E. T. A. Hoffmann ['Tale by E. T. A. Hoffmann']" in the Frauentaschenbuch für das Jahr 1816, ed. la Motte Fouqué (Nürnberg [Nuremberg]: Johann Leonhard Schrag) (Segebrecht 1963: 1032). Although the collection it appeared in bears the year 1816, the date for the 1st ed. is given here as 1815 based on Segebrecht's comment that "die Taschenbücher und Almanache in der Regel bereits im Herbst vor dem Jahre, für das sie bestimmt waren, erschienen ['the pocketbooks and almanacs generally appeared in the autumn before the year for which they were intended']" (1963: 1034). "Die Fermate" was subsequently included in Die Serapions-Brüder, vol. 1 (1819) (Müller-Seidel 1963: [1155]).
- Die Elixiere des Teufels [The Devil's Elixir] (2 vol., 1815–1816)

=== 1816 ===
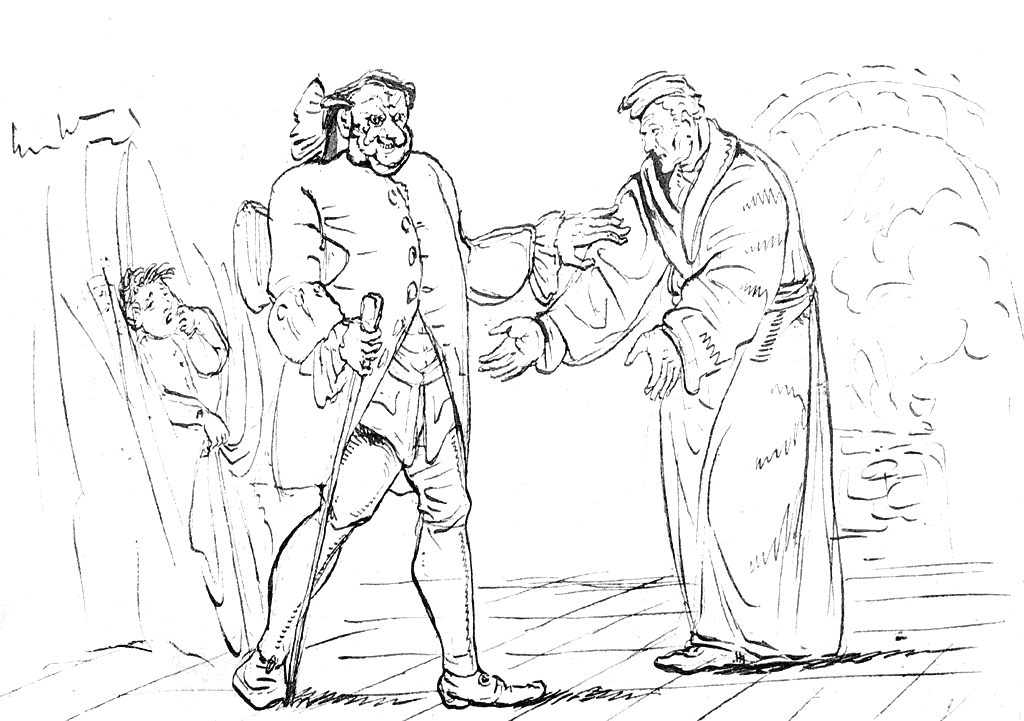
Drawing by E. T. A. Hoffmann for his book Der Sandmann

- "Ahnungen aus dem Reiche der Töne ['Premonitions from the Tonal Realm']" (1816)
  Original version of "Johannes Kreislers Lehrbrief" (1815) that first appeared with the byline "Hff." in the Morgenblatt für gebildete Stände, vol. 10, no. 45–46 (February 21, 1816 – February 22, 1816) (Mazza 1996: 778).
- Nachtstücke [Night Pieces or Nocturnes] (2 vol., 1816–1817)
  - Vol. 1 (1816)
    - "Der Sandmann ['The Sandman']" (1816)
    - "Ignaz Denner" (1816)
    - "Die Jesuiterkirche in G. ['The Jesuit Church in G.']" (1816)
    - "Das Sanctus ['The Sanctus']" (1816)
  - Vol. 2 (1817)
    - "Das öde Haus ['The Bleak House']" (1817)
    - "Das Majorat ['Primogeniture']" (1817)
    - "Das Gelübde ['The Oath']" (1817)
    - "Das steinerne Herz ['The Stone Heart']" (1817)

=== 1817 ===
- "Ein Brief von Hoffmann an Herrn Baron de la Motte Fouqué ['A Letter from Hoffmann to Baron de la Motte Fouqué']" (comp. 1816; 1st ed. 1817; final ed. 1819)
  Completed in September 1816 (Segebrecht 1963: 1038), this piece first appeared in the Frauentaschenbuch für das Jahr 1818, ed. la Motte Fouqué (Nürnberg [Nuremberg]: Johann Leonhard Schrag) in the form of a letter containing the untitled story of "Rat Krespel" (Segebrecht 1963: 1032) in a postscript (Segebrecht 1963: 1041). Although the collection it appeared in bears the year 1818, the date for the 1st ed. is given here as 1817 based on Segebrecht's comment that "die Taschenbücher und Almanache in der Regel bereits im Herbst vor dem Jahre, für das sie bestimmt waren, erschienen ['the pocketbooks and almanacs generally appeared in the autumn before the year for which they were intended']" (1963: 1034). The "Rat Krespel" portion was subsequently included in Die Serapions-Brüder, vol. 1 (1819), once again without a title (Hoffmann 1819–1821/1963: 31).

=== 1818 ===
- Seltsame Leiden eines Theaterdirektors [Strange Sorrows of a Theater Director] (1818)

=== 1819 ===
- "Bruchstück aus den Serapionsbrüdern ['Fragment from the Serapion Brothers']: Der Einsiedler Serapion ['The Hermit Serapion']" (comp. 1818; 1st ed. 1819; final ed. 1819)
  This story was probably composed in November and December 1818 (Segebrecht 1963: 1036). It first appeared anonymously in Der Freimüthige für Deutschland: Zeitblatt der Belehrung und Aufheiterung, vol. 1, no. 4, 6, and 8, ed. K. Müchler and Johann Daniel Symanski (January 5, 1819 – January 11, 1819) (Segebrecht 1963: 1032) and was subsequently embedded without a title in Die Serapions-Brüder, vol. 1 (1819) (Hoffmann 1819–1821/1963: 17).
- "Das Fräulein von Scuderi ['Mademoiselle Scudéry']" (1819), a short story considered his masterpiece)
- Die Serapions-Brüder [The Serapion Brothers] (1st and final ed., 4 vol., 1819–1821)
  First appeared [. . .] after which the Serapion Fraternity of writers in early 20th century Russia was to name itself
  - Vol. 1 (1819)
    - "Vorwort ['Foreword']" (1st and final ed., 1819)
    - "Erster Abschnitt ['First Section']"
      - "Der Einsiedler Serapion ['The Hermit Serapion']" (1819)
      - "Rat Krespel ['Councilor Krespel']" (1817)
      - "Die Fermate" (1815)
      - "Der Dichter und der Komponist" (1813)
    - "Zweiter Abschnitt ['Second Section']"
      - "Ein Fragment aus dem Leben dreier Freunde ['A Fragment from the Life of Three Friends']" (1818)
      - "Der Artushof ['The Court of Arthur']" (1816)
      - "Die Bergwerke zu Falun ['The Mines of Falun']" (1819)
      - "Nußknacker und Mausekönig ['Nutcracker and Mouse King']" (1816)
  - Vol. 2 (1819)
    - "Dritter Abschnitt ['Third Section']"
      - "Der Kampf der Sänger ['The Contest of the Singers']" (1818)
      - "Eine Spukgeschichte ['A Ghost Story']" (1819)
      - "Die Automate ['The Automaton']" (1814)
      - "Doge und Dogaresse ['Doge and Dogaressa']" (1818)
    - "Vierter Abschnitt ['Fourth Section']"
      - "Alte und neue Kirchenmusik ['Old and New Church Music']" (1814)
      - "Meister Martin der Küfner und seine Gesellen ['Master Martin the Cooper and His Journeymen']" (1818)
      - "Das fremde Kind ['The Mysterious Child']" (1817)
  - Vol. 3 (1820)
    - "Fünfter Abschnitt ['Fifth Section']"
      - "Nachricht aus dem Leben eines bekannten Mannes ['News from the Life of a Well-Known Man']" (1819)
      - "Die Brautwahl ['The Bride Selection']" (1819)
      - "Der unheimliche Gast ['The Uncanny Guest']" (1819)
    - "Sechster Abschnitt ['Sixth Section']"
      - "Das Fräulein von Scuderi" (1819)
      - "Spielerglück ['Gambler's Luck']" (1819)
      - "Der Baron von B. ['The Baron of B.']" (1819)
  - Vol. 4 (1821)
    - "Siebenter Abschnitt ['Seventh Section']"
      - "Signor Formica" (1819)
      - "Zacharias Werner" (1821)
      - "Erscheinungern ['Manifestations']" (1817)
    - "Achter Abschnitt ['Eighth Section']"
      - "Der Zusammenhang der Dinge ['The Coherence of Things']" (1820)
      - "Vampirismus ['Vampirism']" (1821)
      - "Die ästhetische Teegesellschaft ['The Aesthetic Tea Society']" (1821)
      - "Die Königsbraut ['The King's Bride']" (1821)
- Lebensansichten des Katers Murr nebst fragmentarischer Biographie des Kapellmeisters Johannes Kreisler in zufälligen Makulaturblättern [The Life and Opinions of the Tomcat Murr with a Fragmentary Biography of the Music Director Johannes Kreisler in Accidentally Intermingled Pages] (2 vol., 1819–1821, fragment)
- Klein Zaches genannt Zinnober [Little Zaches, Called Cinnobar] (1819)

=== 1820 ===
- "Die Irrungen: Fragment aus dem Leben eines Fantasten ['The Errors: Fragment from the Life of a Fantast']" (1820)

=== 1821 ===
- "Die Geheimnisse: Fortsetzung des Fragments aus dem Leben eines Fantasten, 'Die Irrungen' ['The Secrets: Continuation of the Fragment from the Life of a Fantast, "The Errors"']" (1821)

=== 1822 ===
- Meister Floh (1822)

=== 1825 ===
- Letzte Erzählungen (1825)
  - "Haimatochare"
  - "Die Marquise de la Pivardiere"
  - "Die Irrungen"
  - "Die Geheimnisse" (sequel to Die Irrungen)
  - "Der Elementargeist"
  - "Die Räuber"
  - "Die Doppeltgänger"
  - "Datura fastuosa"
  - "Meister Johannes Wacht"
  - "Des Vetters Eckfenster"
  - Naivität
  - "Die Genesung"
  - "Neueste Schicksale eines abenteuerlichen Mannes"
  - "Der Feind"
