= Sandman =

Mythical character in European folklore who puts people to sleep

The Sandman is a mythical character originating in Germanic and Scandinavian folklore. He visits children in the evening, sprinkles sleep-inducing sand into their eyes and brings dreams. In the morning, the sleep sand is rubbed from the corner of the eyes.

== Representation in traditional folklore ==
The Sandman is a traditional character in many children's stories and books. In Scandinavian folklore, he is said to sprinkle sand or dust on or into the eyes of children at night to bring on sleep and dreams. The grit or "sleep" (rheum) in one's eyes upon waking is the supposed result of the Sandman's work the previous night.

== Literature ==
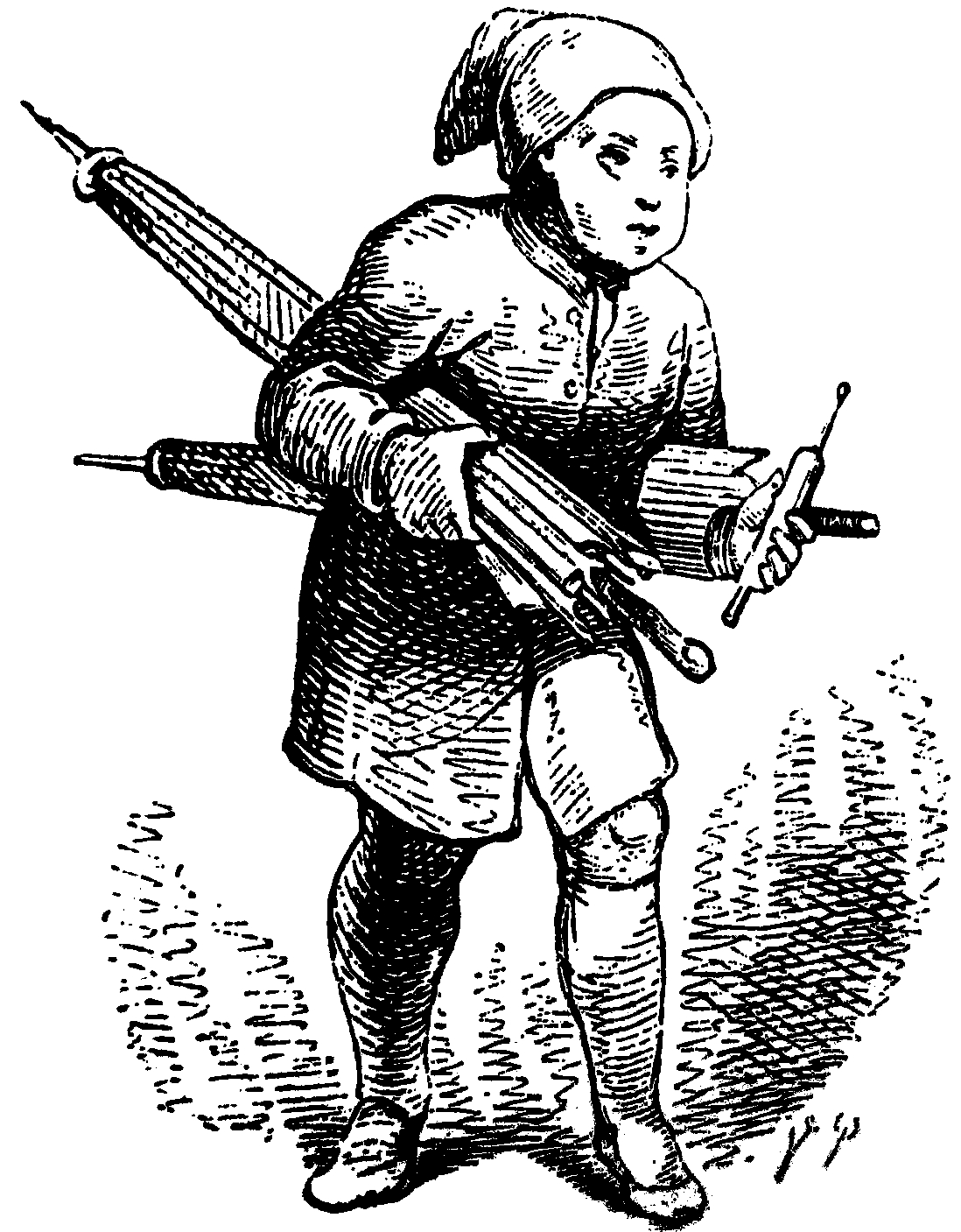
Vilhelm Pedersen representation for the fairy tale "Ole Lukøje" by Hans Christian Andersen

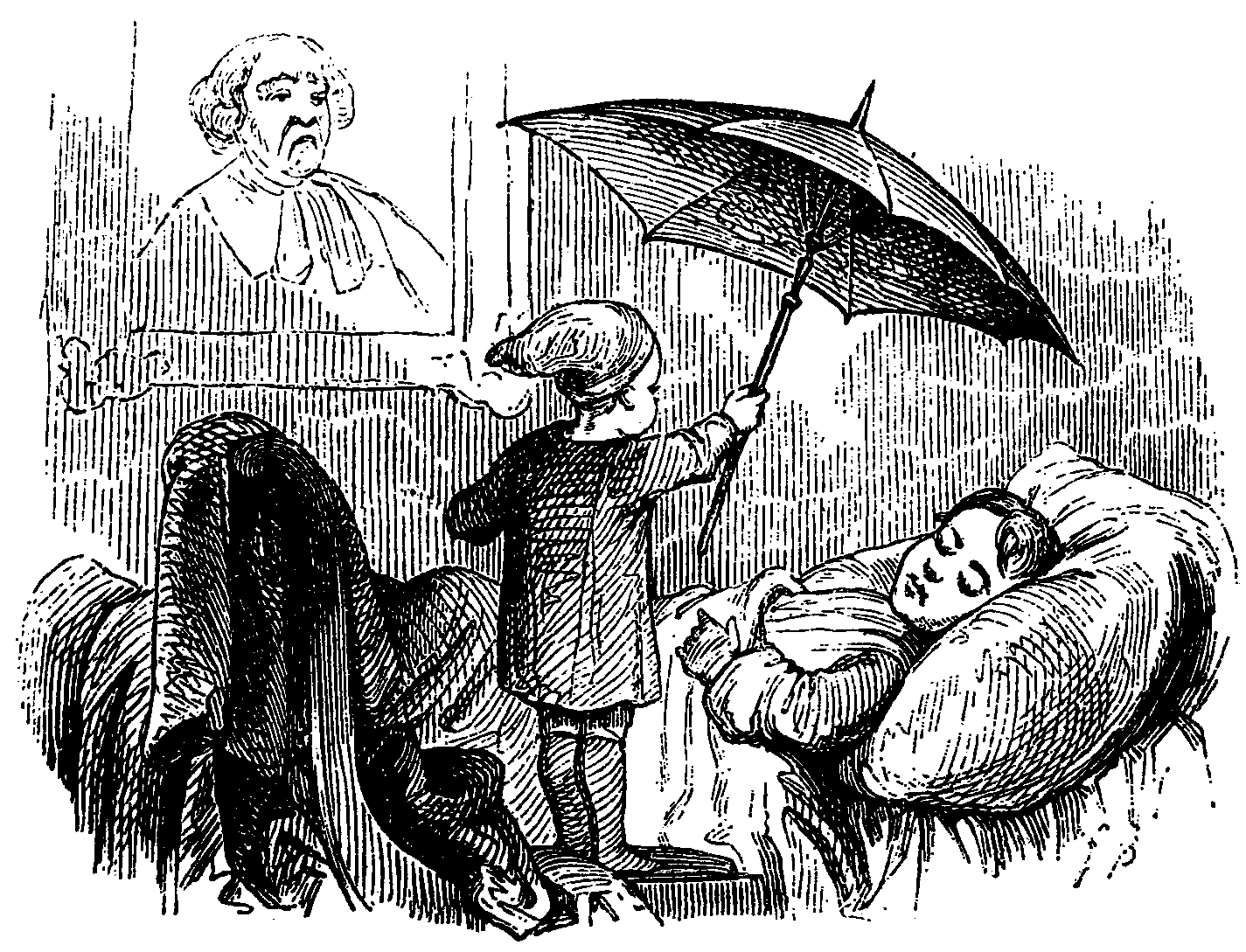
Vilhelm Pedersen depiction of "Ole Lukøje".

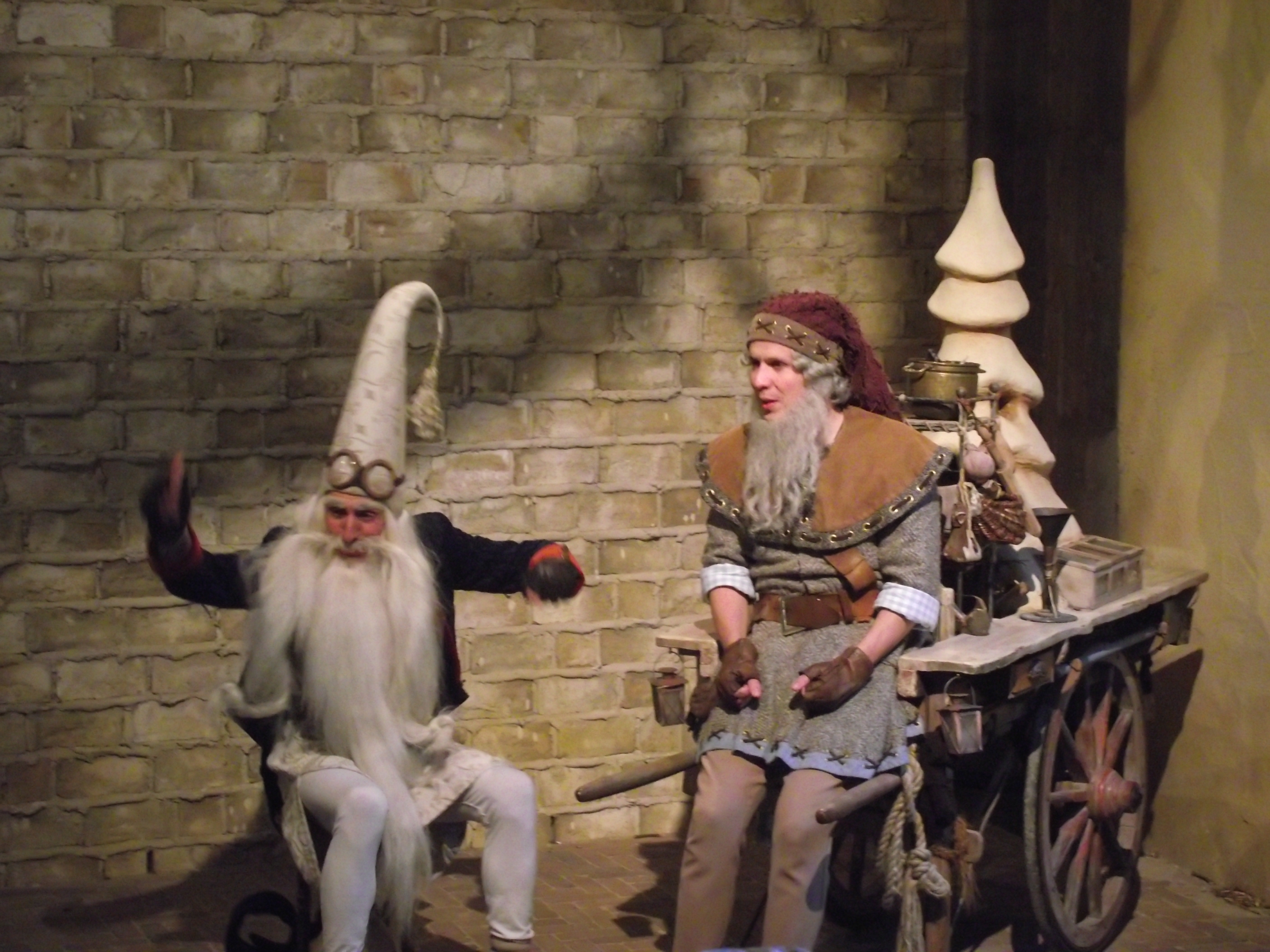
Klaas Vaak entertainer in Themepark Efteling

E. T. A. Hoffmann (1776–1822) wrote a short story in 1816 titled Der Sandmann, which showed how sinister such a character could be made. According to the protagonist's nurse, he threw sand in the eyes of children who would not go to sleep, with the result of those eyes falling out and being collected by the Sandman, who then takes the eyes to his iron nest on the Moon and uses them to feed his children. The protagonist of the story grows to associate this nightmarish creature with the genuinely sinister figure of his father's associate, Coppelius. In Romanian folklore, there is a similar character, Moș Ene (Ene the Elder). Hoffmann's version of the sandman is also similar to the French Canadian character known as the Bonhomme Sept Heures (Goodman Seven O'Clock), who, in some versions, throws sand in children's eyes to blind them so that he may capture them. Contrarily to the sandman, his bag is the place where he traps children who do not go to bed.

Hans Christian Andersen's 1841 folk tale Ole Lukøje introduced the Sandman, named Ole Lukøje, by relating dreams he gave to a young boy in a week through his magical technique of sprinkling dust in the eyes of the children. "Ole" is a Danish first name and "Lukøje" means "shut-eye". Andersen wrote:

There is nobody in the world who knows so many stories as Ole-Luk-Oie, or who can relate them so nicely. In the evening, while the children are seated at the table or in their little chairs, he comes up the stairs very softly, for he walks in his socks, then he opens the doors without the slightest noise, and throws a small quantity of very fine dust in their eyes, just enough to prevent them from keeping them open, and so they do not see him. Then he creeps behind them, and blows softly upon their necks, till their heads begin to droop. But Ole-Luk-Oie does not wish to hurt them, for he is very fond of children, and only wants them to be quiet that he may relate to them pretty stories, and they never are quiet until they are in bed and asleep. As soon as they are asleep, Ole-Luk-Oie seats himself upon the bed. He is nicely dressed; his coat is made of silken fabric; it is impossible to say of what color, for it changes from green to red, and from red to blue as he turns from side to side. Under each arm he carries an umbrella; one of them, with pictures on the inside, he spreads over the good children, and then they dream the most beautiful stories the whole night. But the other umbrella has no pictures, and this he holds over the naughty children so that they sleep heavily, and wake in the morning without having dreams at all.

In Norway and Sweden, he is called John Blund or Jon Blund ("blunda" is a verb that means both "to shut one's eyes" and "to keep one's eyes shut", and "[en] blund" is a noun that means both "[an] occurrence of eyes shut" and "[an] occurrence of sleep"), and in the Netherlands, Belgium and parts of southern Africa, he is referred to as "Klaas Vaak".

Klaas Vaak is a character in a Dutch Musical 'De sprookjesmusical Klaas Vaak", has its own TV-series 'Fairytales of Klaas Vaak' and is one of the entertainers in the amusement park 'Efteling'.

== Film and television ==
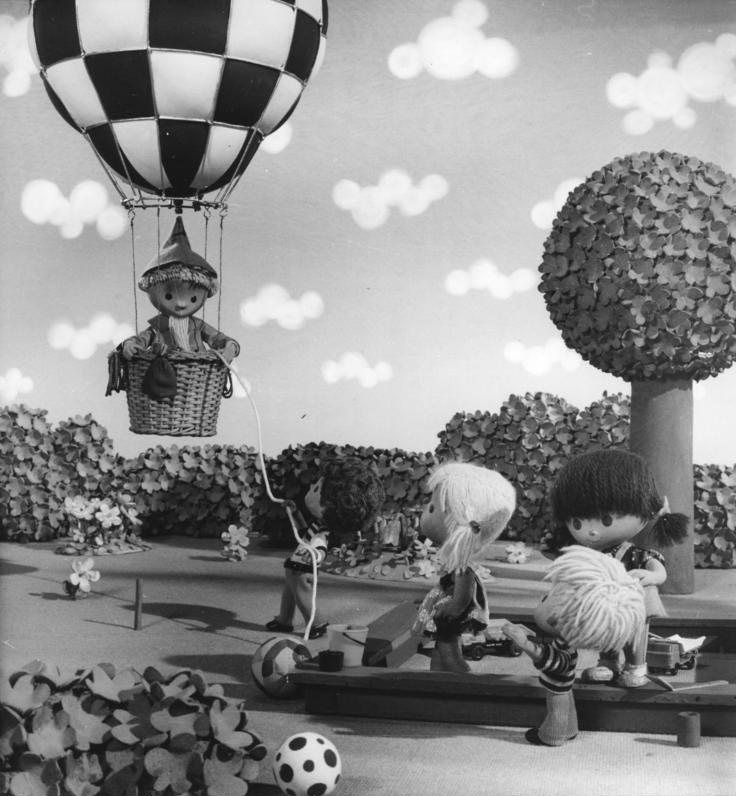
The East German Sandmännchen in a hot air balloon

The East German stop motion children's television programme Unser Sandmännchen (Our Little Sandman), based on Hans Christian Andersen's Ole Lukøje character and the story by E. T. A. Hoffmann, has been broadcast since 1959, along with a West German version which was discontinued after reunification.

The 1976 movie Logan's Run features a main protagonist whose job title is 'sandman' and is referred to by his job title throughout the film. Being a 'sandman' in the film involves catching 'runners' who are attempting to escape a ritual all members of the society must complete when they turn 30.

In the 1990s, Nilus the Sandman aired on Anglophone Canadian television.

In the 1970s, Bonne nuit les petits aired on French television. The show featured Nounours, a bear who took care of two toddlers, Nicolas and Pimprenelle. He would arrive on a cloud driven by his friend Sandman ("Le marchand de sable" in French) playing a flute as the sun set, and would only leave once he'd accompanied the children to bed. At the end of every episode, Nounours would say "Bonne nuit les petits" (which means "Good night, little ones") before Sandman created a light shower of sand, putting the two siblings, Nicolas and Pimprenelle, to sleep. The bear and Sandman would then take their leave on the same cloud, once Nounours had climbed back up the ladder that he'd descended at the beginning of the episode. Here, Sandman has a major role to play, with his flute, driving the cloud, interacting with the other characters from time to time and, most importantly, inducing the children to fall asleep. The show was broadcast nightly at 7:50 pm, and each episode lasted 10 minutes, marking 8 pm as the bed-time when children, duly reassured, could sleep peacefully. It was later reduced to 5 minutes in the 1990s for the reboot series. In francophone Canada, it airs on Ici Radio-Canada Télé immediately before Le Téléjournal.

The Sandman appears in The Smurfs episodes "Darkness Monster" and "Lazy's Nightmare", voiced by Frank Welker.

In 1991, Paul Berry directed a stop-motion short film titled The Sandman based on the short story Der Sandmann by E. T. A. Hoffmann.

In 1993, Bobcat Goldthwait portrayed the Sandman in the children's horror anthology series Are You Afraid of the Dark?, in an episode entitled "The Final Wish."

In 1998, the Sandman also appears in The Powerpuff Girls, where he appears in the episode "Dream Scheme" voiced by Greg Eagles.

The Sandman appears in The Santa Clause 2, The Santa Clause 3: The Escape Clause, and The Santa Clauses portrayed by Michael Dorn. He is shown to be a member of the Council of Legendary Figures and tends to doze off during meetings, giving the other members cause to wake him up.

The Sandman is supposedly represented as the demon Der Kindestod in the series Buffy the Vampire Slayer.

In 2002, Sandman was the main focus of the Baby Looney Tunes episode "The Sandman Is Coming" where Granny talks about him to the babies.

Among the earlier productions of the British sci-fi television show Doctor Who following the 2005 revival is an episode revolving around Sandmen. The ninth episode of the ninth season (2015), titled "Sleep No More", is a found footage video narrated by Gagan Rassmussen (Reece Shearsmith), a scientist and professor from the 38th century. Rassmussen manufactures a dangerous adventure involving Sandmen, intended to engage people to watch the video and by which an electronic signal transmits to the brains of others in order to create further Sandmen. The episode also makes use of the song "Mr. Sandman", written by Pat Ballard in 1954, as the Morpheus-machine theme.

The Sandman appears in Rise of the Guardians as a member of the Guardians.

Netflix released The Sandman series in 2022, an adaptation of the Neil Gaiman comics.

In the 2025 Netflix film In Your Dreams, The Sandman is portrayed as a villain by keeping anybody inside the dream to achieve their dream, as seen on the effect of Stevie Ting, one of the protagonists of the film.

== Comics ==
Hoffmann's short story has been the basis for multiple comics adaptations. Dino Battaglia produced an adaptation published as Olimpia in linus nr. 62 in 1970. An album by Andrea Grosso Ciponte and Dacia Palmerino was published as Sandmann in 2014. Sandmann by Michael Mikolajczak and Jacek Piotrowski is a continuation of the story and was published in 2019. Der Sandmann by Vitali Konstantinov was also published in 2019.

In Marvel Mystery Comics, the Sandman lives in the Land of Dreams, which is located in the Realm of Fairies within the potentially imaginary world of Nowhere. The Sandman ruled over the realm and would place a blanket over it every day. Those who grabbed a dream from the dream tree would have a dream based on whatever they grabbed from the tree and awaken again when the Sandman removed the blanket over his land. Anyone who did not grab a dream would end up in an eternal, dreamless sleep.

Several fictional characters by the name of Sandman have appeared in comic books published by DC Comics. These include fantasy writer Neil Gaiman's 75-part comic book series called The Sandman for Vertigo Comics (an imprint of DC Comics). The original series ran from 1989 to 1996. It tells the story of Dream of the Endless, who rules over the world of dreams. He is an anthropomorphic personification of dreams known to various characters throughout the series as Morpheus, Oneiros, the Shaper of Form, Lord of the Dreaming, the Dream King, Dream-Sneak, the Cat of Dreams, Murphy, Kai'ckul, and Lord L'Zoril. He possesses three symbols of office: a helm, an amulet known as the Dreamstone, and a sand pouch.

A comics adaption of the above-mentioned German TV show Unser Sandmännchen has also been published. Most notably on the back pages of FF Dabei focusing on Pittiplatsch and his friends.

== Music ==
Songs based on the figure of the Sandman include the 1950s classic "Mr. Sandman" by The Chordettes, Roy Orbison's "In Dreams" in which the singer is put to sleep by "a candy-colored clown they call the sandman" to dream of his lost love, and Metallica's "Enter Sandman" whose lyrics "juxtapose childhood bedtime rituals and nightmarish imagery" and originally included a reference to crib death. The Sandman also appears in the song "Blood Red Sandman" by Lordi, "Mein Herz brennt" by Rammstein, "Dream Weaver" by Sandman and Klaas Vaak. "Sandmann" by Oomph!, "Sandman" by Manchester-based duo Hurts, the 1971 song "Sandman" by America and the version of the lullaby "Morningtown Ride" recorded by The Seekers and is mentioned briefly in the songs "Headfirst Slide into Cooperstown on a Bad Bet" by Fall Out Boy and "Farewell and Goodnight" from the Smashing Pumpkins album Mellon Collie and the Infinite Sadness. Ed Sheeran's album = (Equals) contains a song name "Sandman" that refers to the sandman bringing magical dreams. Oranger also released a song titled "Mr. Sandman" with reference to the mythical character. In 2021 SYML recorded a song at St. Mark's Cathedral called "Mr. Sandman". American rapper ASAP Rocky released a song called Sandman on his 2021 re-release of his debut mixtape Live. Love. ASAP. Dominic Fike has a song titled "Sandman", on his album Rocket, that states that Fike isn't the "Sandman's type" because he doesn't get any sleep.

== Video games ==
Sandman also appears as the main antagonist in the horror role-playing game The Sandman, the second installment of the Strange Man series by Uri. In the game, the sandman is a fairy who suffers from insomnia and so decides to put the whole world to sleep. Completing the game unlocks an extra story where the sandman is a playable character.

In the game Deadlock by Valve, the playable character Haze is a member of the Sandman Division of the fictional government organization OSIC, and has the ability to put people to sleep and enter their dreams.

== See also ==
- Morpheus – Greek god of dreams
- Rheum – Traditionally said to be from the Sandman

== Bibliography ==
- Andersen, Hans Christian. Fairy Tales of Hans Christian Andersen.
- Conrad, JoAnn (2023) "Jon Blund's Marvelous Dreams and Sweet Sleep," in Traum und Traumen in Kinder- und Jugendmedien (Brill)
- Tatar, Maria (2003). Hard Facts of the Grimms' Fairy Tales. Princeton, NJ: Princeton University Press. ISBN 978-0-691-01487-6.
- Hoffman, E.T.A. (1816). "Der Sandmann". Nachtstücke.
- Wm. G. Thilgen Jr. (2013) The Sand Man (Lulu Press, Inc.) ISBN 9781304298874
