= Sandmann (comic book) =

2019 comic book by Michael Mikolajczak and Jacek Piotrowski

- Date: 10 October 2019
- Page count: 160 pages
- Publisher: Kult Comics

Creative team
- Writer: Michael Mikolajczak
- Artist: Jacek Piotrowski

Original publication
- Language: German
- ISBN: 978-3-96430-024-9

Sandmann is a 2019 comic book written by Michael Mikolajczak and illustrated by Jacek Piotrowski. It follows the student Nathanael who fears that his neighbour Coppelius is the Sandman of folklore. The comic is a continuation of the 1816 short story "The Sandman" by E. T. A. Hoffmann.

The comic is 160 pages long, black-and-white and mixes drawings with photographic collage. The visuals were influenced by German expressionist cinema and contain visual quotations of paintings by Sandro Botticelli, Egon Schiele and Paul Gauguin. The book was first published in German by Kult Comics on 10 October 2019.
