= Johannes Kreisler =

Literary character

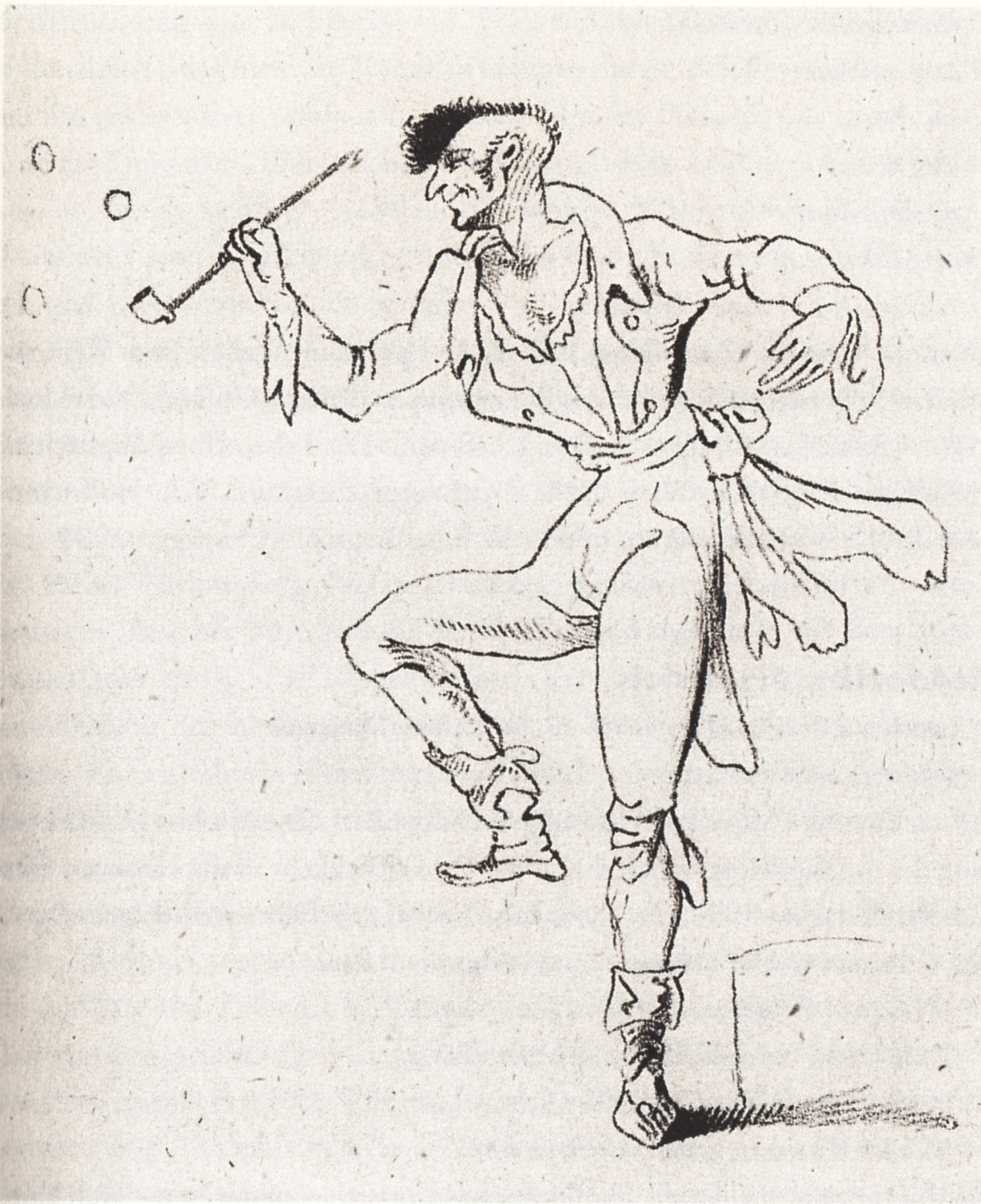
Kreisler as sketched by Hoffmann

Johannes Kreisler is the name of a character in three novels by E.T.A. Hoffmann: Kreisleriana (1813), Johannes Kreisler, des Kapellmeisters Musikalische Leiden (1815), and The Life and Opinions of the Tomcat Murr together with a fragmentary Biography of Kapellmeister Johannes Kreisler on Random Sheets of Waste Paper (1822). He appears briefly in The Golden Pot (1814) and in some of Hoffmann's journalism as well.

The moody, asocial composer Kreisler, Hoffmann's alter ego, is a musical genius whose creativity is stymied by an excessive sensibility. The character inspired Robert Schumann's Kreisleriana for piano, op. 16 (1838), and the first movement of György Kurtág's Hommage à R. Sch. op. 15/d (merkwürdige Pirouetten des Kapellmeisters Johannes Kreisler), for clarinet, viola, and piano. In the manuscript of Brahms's Variations on a Theme by Schumann, Op. 9, he marked each variation with a B for Brahms or a Kr for Kreisler, modeling this practice on the two alter egos Schumann created for himself, "Florestan", which for Schumann represented the passionate and outgoing side of his nature and "Eusebius", the withdrawn, reflective side. Brahms's identification with his alter ego 'Johannes Kreisler Junior' would continue until at least 1860, with a number of manuscripts being dedicated to this alias and with the composer often being addressed as such by his friends Julius Otto Grimm and Joseph Joachim.
