= The Sandman (1991 film) =

1991 short film directed by Paul Berry

- Directed by: Paul Berry
- Production company: Berry, Batty, MacKinnon Productions; Cosgrove Hall Productions
- Distributed by: Channel 4 Television Corporation
- Released: 1 May 1991
- Runtime: 9 minutes
- Language: English

The Sandman is a 1991 stop-motion short film, animated and directed by Paul Berry and nominated for an Oscar for Best Animated Short Film in 1993. The storyline is inspired by E.T.A. Hoffmann's version of the European legend of The Sandman.

== Plot ==
Late on a moonlit evening, a young boy is sent up to bed by his mother. He walks through the darkened hallway of his house and ascends the long, narrow flights of stairs alone, becoming increasingly paranoid that something is following him, until he reaches the safety of his bedroom. As he's drifting off to sleep, he sees a face appear in the crescent Moon outside his window, which looks back at him.

At the bottom of the stairs, the Sandman, a monstrous bird-like creature, appears, looking like the face the boy saw. He begins to clamber upstairs, slamming doors and creaking floorboards all the way to let the boy know of its impending presence. Frightened, the boy accidentally knocks over his oil lamp — alerting the monster to exactly what room he is in. The boy hides under the covers, as a figure opens the door and approaches his bed. It is revealed to be his mother, who retrieves the broken lamp and tucks him in for the night. As he falls asleep, feeling safe once more, the Sandman appears in his room and begins to make noise, trying to rouse him. When the boy finally opens his eyes, the monster blows sand in them and takes something from him, before departing through the bedroom window.

The Sandman returns to his nest on the Moon, where his hungry children are waiting. The Sandman gets out the boy's eyes, which he plucked out, and feeds his young with them.

In the post-credits scene, the eyeless boy, wanders around bumping into unseen people and waving at them. He then looks at the camera, and then it shows that there were others like him, also looking at the camera.

== Style and influence ==
The art direction of The Sandman was highly influenced by German Expressionism.

== See also ==
- In 2000, the Brothers Quay made a film, also called The Sandman, which follows a similar plot.
