= The Automata =

1814 short story by E. T. A. Hoffmann

The Automata (German: Die Automate) is a short story written by E. T. A. Hoffmann. Originally published in 1814 in German language literary-culture journal Zeitung für die elegante Welt (Newspaper for the Elegant World), the full story was first published in his book The Serapion Brethren in 1819.

== Plot summary ==
The plot of The Automata follows a series of interconnected stories shared during an evening gathering of men exploring supernatural and philosophical themes.

The narrator arrives late to a gathering, finding the group mesmerized by a swinging gold ring, which sparks debate over whether it moves by their collective will. To substantiate the supernatural, Cyprian recounts a story about a colonel’s family and his haunted daughter Adelgunda, who experiences nightly visions of a terrifying figure despite manipulated clocks. Her strange abilities (such as levitating a plate) lead to tragedy for the family.

The conversation then shifts as Theodore narrates the story of the "Talking Turk," a mechanical automaton known for its human-like appearance and cryptic but accurate answers. College friends Lewis and Ferdinand visit the Turk and Ferdinand receives a mysterious prophecy about a singer he once admired. Their investigations into the Turk’s creator, Professor X———, reveal more artificial marvels but no definitive explanation for the Turk's uncanny powers. Later, Ferdinand writes to Lewis about encountering the singer again, now connected to Professor X———, raising questions about fate and psychic bonds.

Theodore concludes his story ambiguously, leaving the group to debate its meaning and fragmentary nature, emphasizing mystery over resolution.

== Characters ==
- Characters at the gathering:
  - The narrator, who arrives late to the evening gathering
  - Vincent, a friend of the narrator
  - Theodore
  - Lothair
  - Cyprian, teller of the story of Adelgunda
  - Ottmar
- Characters in Cyprian's story:
  - Colonel von P———
  - His wife
  - An elderly frenchwoman
  - Augusta, the colonel's elder daughter
  - Adelgunda, the colonel's younger daughter
- Characters in the Automata manuscript:
  - The Turk's exhibitor
  - Lewis
  - Ferdinand
  - The woman singer
  - Professor X———, the Turk's creator

== Historical significance ==
Some scholars argue that The Automata and Hoffmann's other stories have been to some extent overlooked in the study of early science fiction. Martin Willis explains that each part of the frame narrative (the gathering with the ring, the ghost story of Adelgunda, and the story of the Talking Turk) each explore different aspects of the inter-relatedness between scientific and supernatural ways of knowing in the early 19th century, and not necessarily in mutually exclusive ways.

Other critics note The Automata's early literary connection between the mechanical world of automation and the aesthetic world of music. Katherine Hirt draws on Hoffmann's musical training to explain the way in which the story critiques the mechanical production of sound, using the characters to support the limitations of human performance. Werner Keil points out how Ferdinand elevates the comparatively simple but human performance by the unnamed woman singer.
