= The Deserted House (Hoffmann) =

1815 short story by E. T. A. Hoffmann

- Short story by E. T. A. Hoffmann
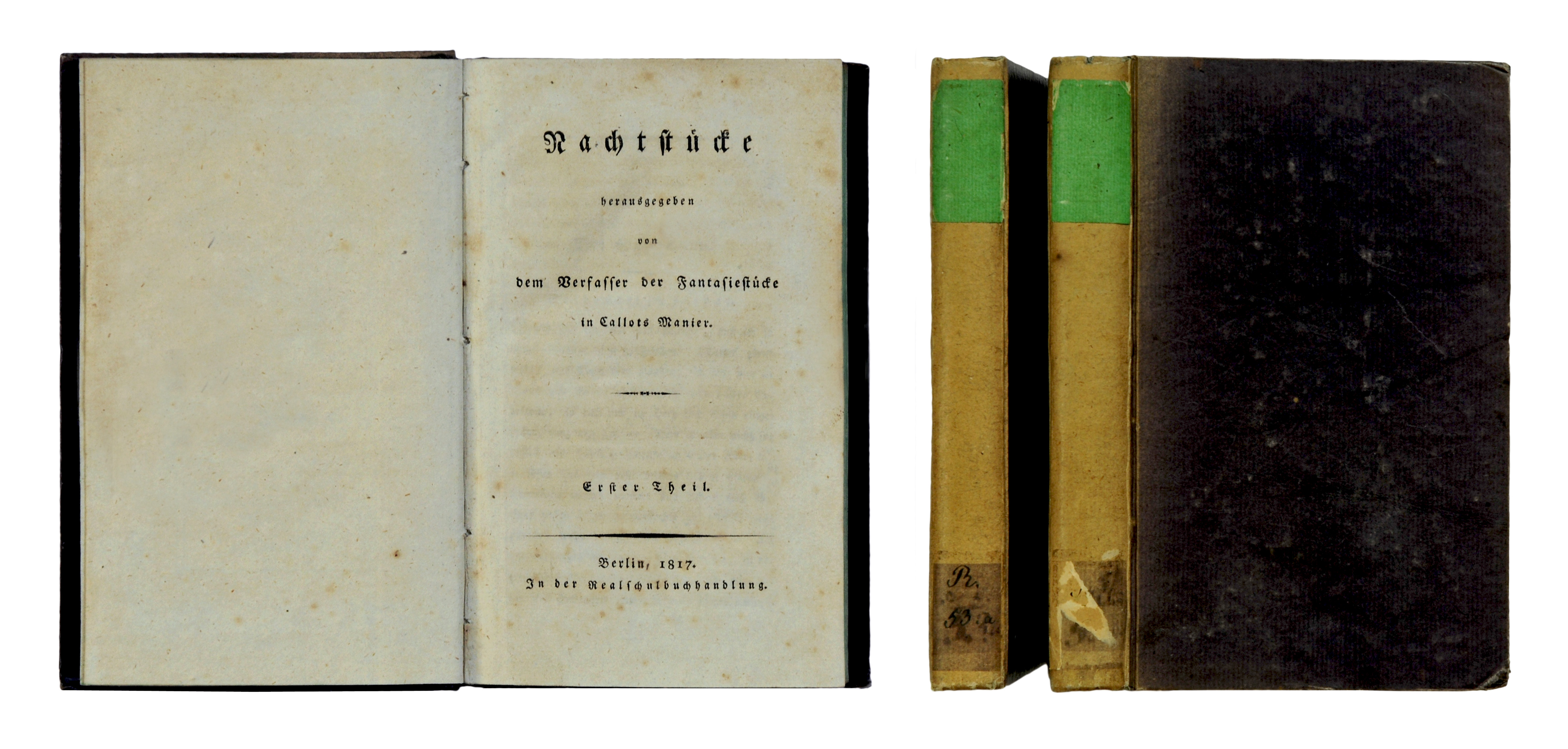
- The title page of the 1816 printing of Night Pieces
- Original title: Das öde Haus

Publication
- Published in: Night Pieces
- Publication date: 1817

The Deserted House (German: Das öde Haus) is a short story by E. T. A. Hoffmann which first appeared in 1817 in the second part of his Night Pieces collection.

== Background ==
A townhouse on Unter den Linden, a street in Berlin, is said to have been the model for the eerie house in The Deserted House.

Hoffmann wrote the story between the autumn of 1816 and the spring of 1817.

== Plot ==
The title of the story refers to a house in a city which is not named, referred to simply as "***n" (Hoffmann had Berlin in mind when writing the story). The narrator, a man called Theodor who is recounting the story to a group of friends, describes an event which took place during his stay in ***n. As he was walking down the main street, he noticed an old run-down house situated between two much larger and grander buildings. This area of the city was known for its beautiful, large buildings so the old house stands out. Theodor wonders why the house has not been torn down. Later on, an acquaintance by the name of Graf P. tells him that the house contains the bakery / kitchen of the Konditorei which borders the house. One day, as he is walking past the house, Theodor notices a female hand in one of the upper windows. Fascinated by this hand, Theodor returns to the house daily and peers in the windows. Eventually, he decides to go in to the Konditorei and ask the owner about the deserted house. The shopkeeper tells him that he does not own the house, although he tried to purchase it several times. Theodor learns from the shopkeeper that the house is haunted – at night, and especially at Christmastime, strange noises can be heard emanating from the house. The baker also tells Theodor that the house is owned by the Graf von S..

Contrary to Theodor's opinion that the house is empty, he learns that there is actually an inhabitant, an old caretaker who enters the Konditorei with his dog whilst Theodor is talking to the shopkeeper. That night, Theodor has dreams of the Graf von S. as well as the caretaker. On the next day he tries to break into the house but is driven out by the caretaker who chastises him and says that the house is not haunted.

The next day, Theodor once again catches sight of a female hand in the window. The hand was wearing diamond jewellery. He buys a pocket mirror from an Italian tobacconist, with which he can view the barren house from a bench facing the opposite side of the street. Theodor stares through the mirror at the figure every day, until one day an old man tells him that the hand is merely a painting, which the caretaker puts in front of the windowsill to dust. The narrator thereafter feels haunted by the mysterious woman at the window, seeing her in his dreams and whenever he looks into the pocket mirror. Theodor consults with Doctor K., a hypnotist and magnetiser who puts Theodor on a magnetic cure.

Theodor tries again to break into the deserted house and encounters a mad woman, who rages at him and can only be subdued by force; the caretaker appears and whips her. Later on, when Theodor is at a dinner party at Graf P.'s residence, he dances with a young woman, who resembles the woman who appeared to Theodor in the mirror; Graf P. says that she is the niece of the mad woman in the house. Theodor meets again with Doctor K. and asks him about this woman; the doctor tells the story of Graf von S., who fell in love with Gräfin Angelika Z. They were set to be married, before the Graf instead decided to marry her sister Gabriele. Before the wedding, Angelika moved into the deserted house in ***n, which was owned by her father. Graf von S. fell ill a year into his marriage to Gabriele and travelled to Pisa. His wife did not accompany him, because she was to give birth 9 days later. The child went missing shortly after its birth. It was later heard that Graf von S. actually died in the house in ***n with Angelika. The child of Gabriele was later returned by a gypsy woman, who fell over and died when Gabriele took her child back into her arms. When the Graf Z. arrives at the house in ***n, he notices that Angelika resembles the gypsy woman who died earlier. He wishes to remove her from the house, but she refuses. Angelika claims that Graf von S. came to her house, and they had sex; the product of their affair was the child brought to Gabriele. Doctor K. tells Theodor that his dance partner was Edmonde, the daughter of Gabriele, and that she was in ***n to sort out family affairs. Theodor recounts how he then left the city. The story ends with Theodor's friend saying: "Goodnight, you Spallanzani bat!" (German: "Gute Nacht, du Spalanzanische Fledermaus!")

== Analysis ==
The Deserted House utilises a frame story; the tale is recounted by Theodor in the context of a conversation with his friends. Theodor is the narrator, protagonist and critic of his own story.

There are similarities between this text and Ludwig Tieck's Liebeszauber, and comparisons can be made between The Deserted House and Greek mythology; the myth of Narcissus, for instance, is evoked by the protagonist's falling in love by usage of a mirror.

The Deserted House shares many themes with Hoffmann's much more popular tale, The Sandman, such as the focus on eyes and vision, characters falling violently in love with women who do not exist.

== Adaptations ==
A comic-book adaptation by Dino Battaglia was published in 1990.
