= Ignaz Denner =

1814 novella by E. T. A. Hoffmann

- Short story by E. T. A. Hoffmann
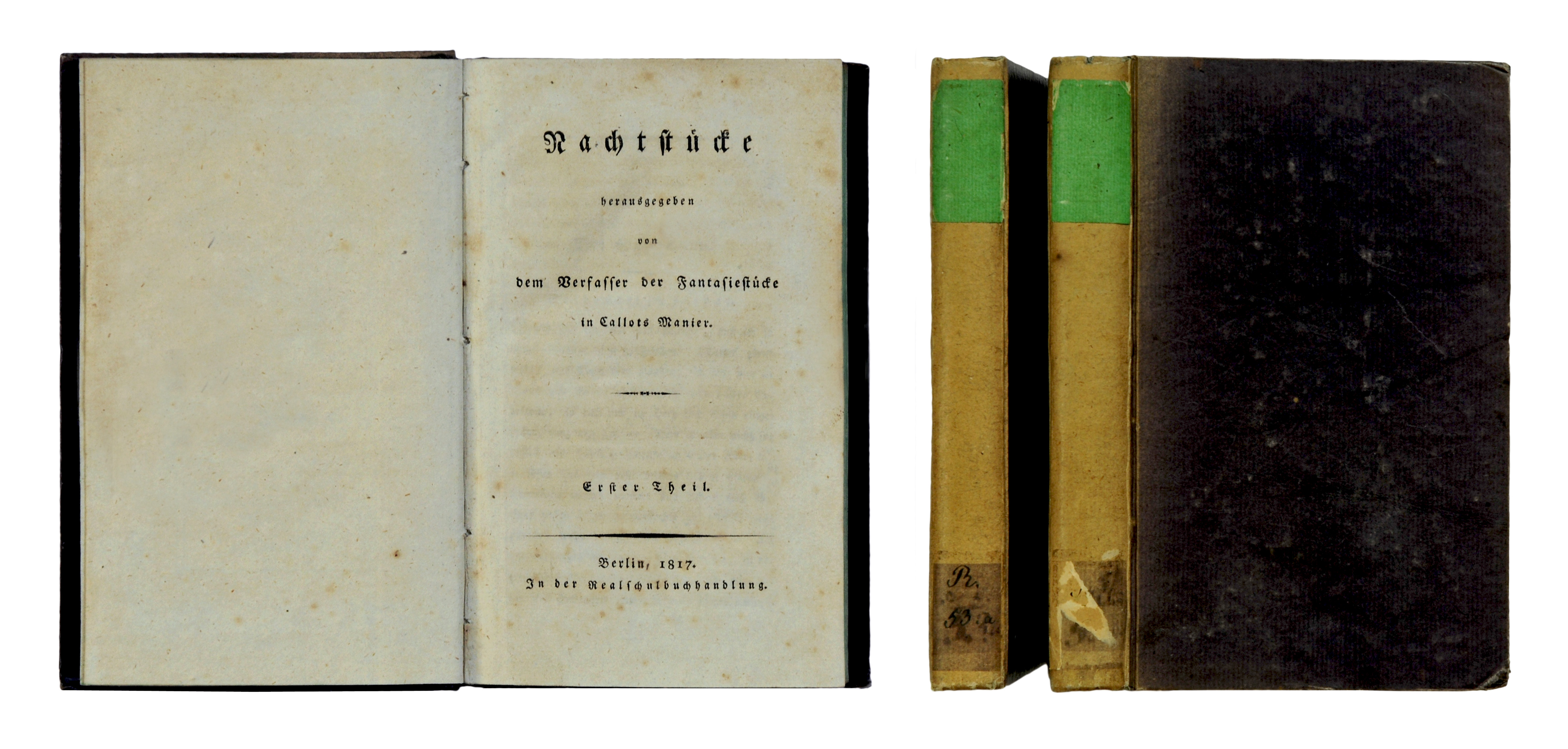
- The title page of the 1817 printing of Night Pieces
- Genre: Dark Romanticism

Publication
- Published in: Night Pieces
- Publication date: September 1816

Ignaz Denner is an 1814 short story by E. T. A. Hoffmann which first appeared in 1816 as part of his Night Pieces collection.

The narrative tells the tale of Andres, a gamekeeper who is haunted by a dubious merchant who is actually a thief using Andres to further his criminal activities. The tale involves infanticide, potions and magic, and fits into the genre of Dark Romanticism.

== Background ==
E. T. A. Hoffmann wrote Ignaz Denner in May 1814. It was originally written for inclusion in Hoffmann's Fantasiestücke but was rejected by the publisher for being too "weak". In early 1816, Hoffmann edited the text, changed its title from Der Revierjäger ("The Gamekeeper") to Ignaz Denner, and it was included in his Night Pieces.

== Plot summary ==
Andres, a gamekeeper, accompanies his master, Graf Aloys von Vach, on a trip through Italy. He is promoted after saving the Graf from a robbery. During the trip, Andres meets Giorgina, an orphan living in an inn where she is mistreated by the innkeeper. Andres and the Graf take Giorgina with them on their return from Italy, and Giorgina and Andres are married. Although Andres holds a somewhat prestigious job, his family and household servant live a life of hardship and misery.

When the couple's first child is born, Giorgina's health deteriorates rapidly, and she is close to death. The family house is paid an unexpected visit by a stranger, who introduces himself as a travelling merchant and heals Giorgina by feeding her drops of a dark red liquid. The next day, as he prepares to leave Andres' hut, he offers Andres some ducat coins as payment for his hospitality. Andres refuses to accept the money, so the merchant offers the money to Giorgina instead, who accepts it. The merchant then asks Andres to allow him to stay in his hut a few days per year, because his merchant activities require him to travel through the area. He gives Andres a box of expensive jewels to look after, then asks for accompaniment through the forest. As they walk through the forest, the merchant reveals his name, Ignaz Denner, to Andres. Thanks to Denner's generosity, Andres' family lives a comfortable life, but the family's relationship with Denner disturbs Andres, as his Christian humility triggers a conflict of conscience within him. Denner reappears when Andres and Giorgina's son is 9 months old. Because he is childless himself, he asks the couple to let their son go with him; he will give the child a good education and look after him well in Strasbourg. Andres and Giorgina vehemently oppose this suggestion.

Denner returns one day in the middle of the night, and asks Andres to accompany him into the forest. In the forest Denner reveals that he is the ringleader of a group of robbers which has been terrorising the area. Andres is forced to take part in a robbery at the house of a rich man called Pacht. During the robbery, Denner is injured in a shootout between the robbers and the forces of the Graf; Andres picks him up and carries him to safety. Denner then promises to leave Andres' family in peace and to leave the area. However, the box containing jewels which Denner gave to Andres remains in the family's ownership.

After Denner leaves, the family quickly falls back into poverty. Giorgina gives birth to another child. One night, Denner returns again, but Andres does not allow him into the house. Andres later finds out from his master (the Graf) that the stepfather of Giorgina has died and left her 2000 ducats in his will. To obtain the money, Andres must travel to Frankfurt. He departs for the city, leaving Giorgina and their son at home. When he returns, Andres finds his house in disarray. Giorgina tells him what has occurred: Ignaz Denner came to the house with his band of robbers to seek refuge after attacking the Graf's Schloss. All of the robbers subsequently left the house, but Denner stayed behind. He locked himself in a room with Andres' son, cut his chest open, and collected the boy's blood in a bowl. Denner also killed the household servant as he attempted to prevent him murdering the son.

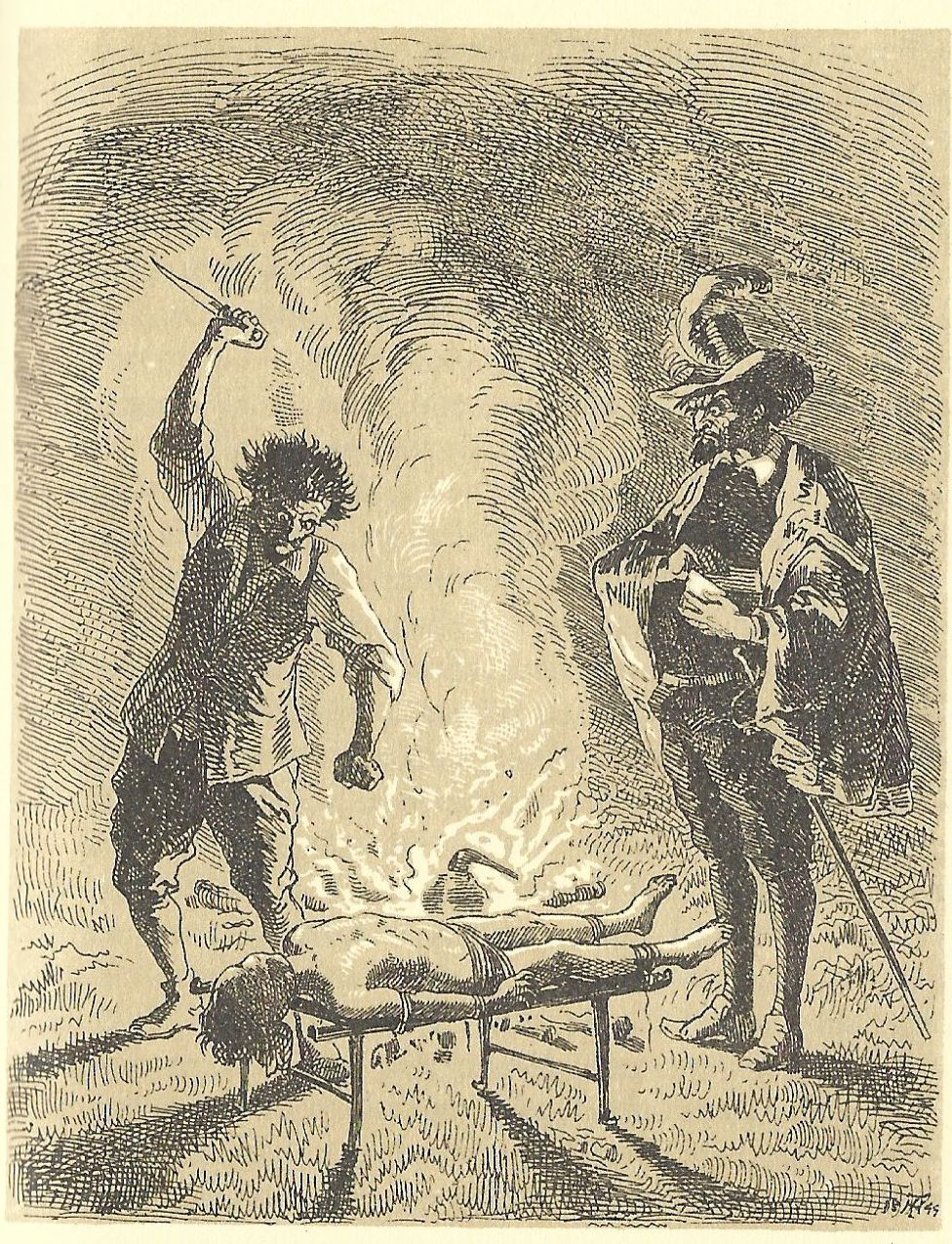
Illustration by Theodor Hosemann (1844) showing Ignaz Denner and Doctor Trabacchio in the forest at the moment they are discovered by Andres

Andres and Giorgina want to leave the forest, but one of the Graf's troops comes and arrests Andres for the murder of the Graf, who was killed during the robber's recent raid. The majority of the robbers have been arrested, including Denner. All of the robbers claim that Andres a member of the gang, and personally killed the Graf. Andres cannot prove his innocence; he does not know the name of the merchant he met in Frankfurt, and there is no evidence he was in Frankfurt at the time of the murder. Some of the Graf's staff claim to have seen Andres shoot the Graf. Andres is tortured until his confesses to the crime and then sentenced to death. In his cell Andres is visited by a ghostly figure who offers him a vial of his child's blood. As he is to be hanged, the merchant arrives from Frankfurt and provides Andres with an alibi. Denner's execution is also postponed as his biography is investigated. It is learnt that he was born in Naples to a Doctor Trabaccio, who manufactured and sold poison. Trabaccio was a sorcerer and was arrested and put on trial for murdering his own son. Because no one knew that he had ever had children, and he had murderered his wives, his crimes remained hidden from the public. Only his youngest son was seen outside. During Trabaccio's trial, his house was searched and a secret laboratory found, which could not be opened. When it did eventually open, it burst into flame and started a fire which burned the house down. The crowd outside watched as Trabaccio's son momentarily appeared on the balcony of the collapsing house before vanishing. When Trabaccio was to be burnt at the stake, he mysteriously disappeared once the flame was lit. He appeared on a distant hill, with a box under his arm, before disappearing for good.

At Ignaz Denner's trial, he is revealed to be the son of Doctor Trabacchio. Andres hears all of this from the nephew of the Graf, with whom he now lives. Giorgina dies after a short time, her body and spirit worn out by what has occurred.

After the trial has lasted two years, Denner is to be executed. However, he manages to escape, and Andres finds him one evening in the woods. Denner reveals that he is Giorgina's father, and Andres takes him into his care. Denner tells Andres that he followed in his father's footsteps; he was married, and his wife gave birth to a child, which Denner intended to kill to make medicine. However, the mother prevented him from doing so. Although Andres is suspicious of Denner, he allows him to play with his grandson. One night in the forest Andres finds Denner and Doctor Trabacchio stretching his son Georg over a grate, with Denner poised to kill the child. Andres shoots Denner in the head and the older Trabacchio disappears.

Andres brings his unharmed son back to the Schloss, and later returns to bury Denner. However, Denner is still alive and dies in Andres' presence. He buries Denner's body with the help of a hunter. The next day, when Andres returns to place a cross on the grave, he discovers that the earth has been churned up and the body removed.

Andres eventually finds peace after he throws Denner's box into a deep ravine.
