= The Sandman (short story) =

1816 short story by E. T. A. Hoffmann

- Short story by E. T. A. Hoffmann
- Original title: Der Sandmann
- Country: Prussia
- Language: German

Publication
- Published in: Night Pieces
- Publisher: Verlag Georg Reimer
- Publication date: September 1816

"The Sandman" (German: Der Sandmann) is a short story by E. T. A. Hoffmann. It was first published in the 1816 book of stories Night Pieces. It is a story of mistaken identity resulting from the love affair between the protagonist Nathanael and an automaton. It addresses themes of possession, hallucination, and breakdown.

== Plot summary ==
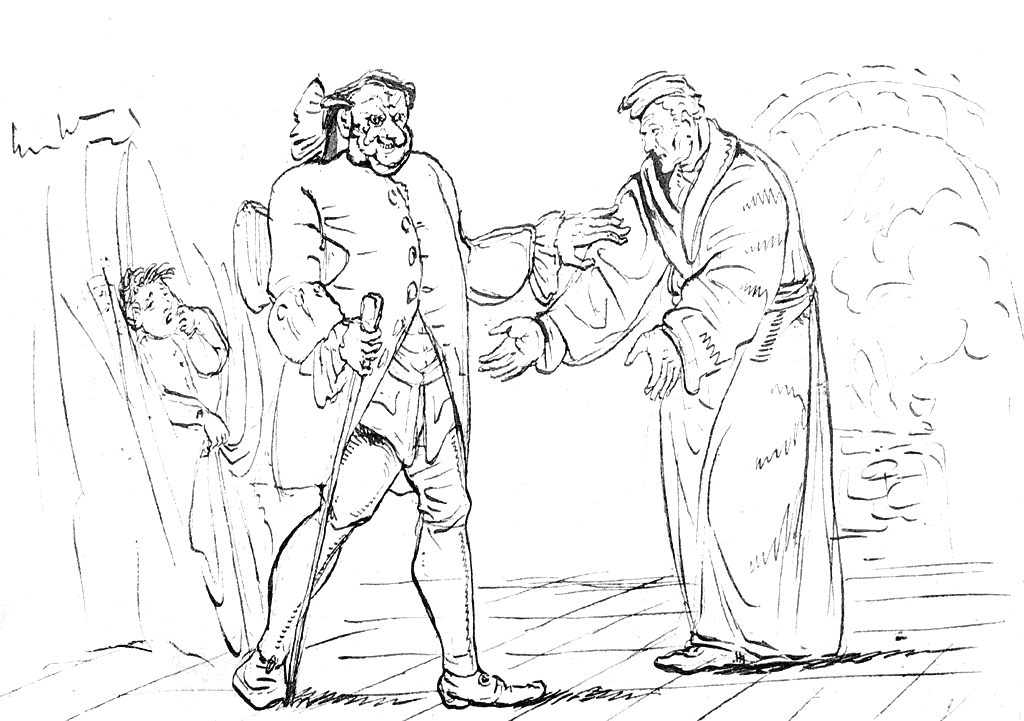
Nathanael's father's meeting with Coppelius. Illustration by E. T. A. Hoffmann.

The story is told by a narrator who claims to have known Lothar, the brother of Nathanael's fiancée, Clara. It begins with three letters between Nathanael, Clara, and Lothar.

1. In the first letter, from Nathanael to Lothar, Nathanael enigmatically tells of a visit from a barometer merchant which has deeply disturbed him. To explain why, he recalls his childhood fear of the "Sandman", a folklore character whom he believes to be the mysterious nightly visitor to his father. One night, he hides in his father's room and discovers that the visitor is Coppelius, a sinister lawyer. His father and Coppelius are undertaking an unknown project with a secret workshop. Nathanael is discovered after seeing Coppelius take a face-like, eyeless shape from the hearth to begin hammering it. Coppelius intends to pour embers into Nathanael's eyes, but his father pleads his eyes be spared. Coppelius instead grips Nathanael's hands and feet, twisting them painfully until he loses consciousness. A year later, another night of experiments caused his father's death in the presence of Coppelius, who then vanished without a trace. His father having died of some sort of flaming explosion, is found with his face unmarked before being laid in his coffin. Nathanael believes that a barometer-seller who arrived recently at his rooms under the name Giuseppe Coppola is none other than the hated Sandman, and he is determined to seek vengeance.
2. A letter from Clara to Nathanael, explaining that Nathanael had addressed the previous letter to her instead of to Lothar. She was touched at the account of Nathanael's childhood trauma, and discussed it with Lothar, but she is convinced that the terrors are of Nathanael's own imagining and urges him to put Coppelius/Coppola out of his mind.
3. A letter from Nathanael to Lothar, in which Nathanael declares that Coppola is not, after all, Coppelius: Coppola is clearly Italian, while Coppelius was German, and Coppola is also vouched for by the new physics professor, Spallanzani, who is also Italian and has known Coppola for years. Nathanael adds that Spallanzani has a daughter, Olimpia [sic], whose brief presence has made a lasting impression on him.

Shortly after this third letter, Nathanael returns to his home town from his studies to see Clara and Lothar, and in the joy of their reunion Coppelius/Coppola is at first forgotten. Nevertheless, the encounter with Coppola has had a profound effect on Nathanael, driving him toward a gloomy mysticism which bores Clara and leads to their gradual estrangement. He writes a poem about Coppelius destroying his happiness in love, in which Coppelius appears at his wedding to touch Clara's eyes and then throws Nathanael into a circle of fire. After he emotionally reads this poem to her, she tells him to throw the insane poem into the fire. Nathanael's frustration with this leads him to call her an "inanimate, accursed automaton", which so enrages Lothar that he in turn insults Nathanael, and a duel is only narrowly averted by Clara's intervention. Nathanael pleads for Clara's forgiveness, and declares his true love for her, and the three then reconcile.

Nathanael returns to complete the final year of his studies, after which he intends to return to his hometown indefinitely. He finds his student lodgings destroyed by fire, though his possessions were rescued by his friends and moved to a new house which is opposite that of Spallanzani. His window now looks directly into that of Olimpia, and he is again struck by her beauty. Coppola calls to sell his wares, and offers "pretty eyes, pretty eyes!", which reawakens Nathanael's childish fear of the Sandman. However, it turns out that Coppola has lenses and spectacles to sell, and also small telescopes, and Nathanael purchases one, hoping to calm his lingering paranoia. As Coppola leaves, Nathanael becomes fixated on watching Olimpia through his telescope, although her fixed gaze and motionless stance disconcert him.

Spallanzani gives a grand party at which it is reported that his daughter will be presented in public for the first time. Nathanael is invited, and becomes enraptured by Olimpia, who plays the piano, sings and dances. Her stiffness of movement and coldness of touch appear strange to many of the company. Nathanael dances with her repeatedly, awed by her perfect rhythm, and eventually tells her of his passion for her, to which Olimpia replies only "Ah, ah!". During the following days, he visits Olimpia repeatedly, reading her the poems and mysticism that had so bored Clara, and Olimpia listens to it all and replies only "Ah, ah!", which Nathanael interprets as understanding. Most other people consider her dull and stupid, although pretty, and with strangely mechanical actions.

Eventually Nathanael determines to propose to Olimpia, but when he arrives at her rooms he finds an argument in progress between Spallanzani and Coppola, who are fighting over the body of Olimpia and arguing over who made the eyes and who made the clockwork. Coppola, who is now revealed as Coppelius in truth, wins the struggle, and makes off with the lifeless and eyeless body, while the injured Spallanzani urges Nathanael to chase after him and recover the automaton to which he has devoted so many years of his life. The sight of Olimpia's eyes lying on the ground drives Nathanael to madness, and he flies at the professor to strangle him. He is pulled away by other people drawn by the noise of the struggle, and in a state of insanity, is taken to an asylum.

Spallanzani recovers from the encounter, but is forced to leave the university because of the sensational revelation of the trick he had played in trying to pass off an automaton as a living person. Coppelius once more vanishes without trace. The narrator adds that the story of the automaton had a widespread effect on society, with many lovers taking steps to ensure they were not enamoured of puppets but of real flesh and blood.

Nathanael appears to recover from his madness and is reunited with Clara and Lothar. He resolves to marry Clara and move to a pleasant estate near his home town. On the way to visit the place, they pass through the town and climb the high steeple to look out at the view. Clara points out a bush that seems to be striding towards them. Nathanael automatically withdraws Coppola's spyglass and, looking through it sideways, sees Clara through the lens. With Clara in place of Olimpia as the subject of the spyglass's gaze, madness strikes Nathanael again, and he tries to hurl Clara from the steeple. She is saved by Lothar, but in the crowd that gathers below Coppelius appears, and upon seeing him Nathanael cries "pretty eyes, pretty eyes!" and leaps over the railing to his death. Coppelius disappears into the crowd.

Many years afterward, the narrator concludes, it is said that Clara was seen with a kind-looking man sitting before a country house with two lovely boys, and thus found the domestic happiness that Nathanael could never have provided.

== Characters ==
- Nathanael: Narcissistic protagonist with a manic sense of mission.
- Clara: Nathanael's fiancée with a peaceful, judicious, yet determined temperament.
- Lothar: Clara's brother and Nathanael's friend.
- Nathanael's father: Alchemical experimentalist whose dealings with Coppelius during Nathanael's childhood lead to his death.
- Coppelius: Fear-instilling, large and malformed man who spoiled the happiness of Nathanael and his siblings in their childhood and may be implicated in the death of Nathanael's father.
- Coppola: Italian trader in barometers and lenses, in whom Nathanael recognizes Coppelius.
- Spallanzani: Physics professor with whom Nathanael is studying, and collaborator with Coppola on building the lifelike automaton Olimpia. He shares his name with a real scientist who published during Hoffmann's lifetime, and is alluded to in the story.
- Olimpia: "Daughter" of Nathanael's professor, Spallanzani, who is later revealed to be an automaton, or robot; this revelation is one of the elements that incites Nathanael's madness.
- Siegmund: Attempts to save his friend Nathanael from unhappiness and insanity.

== Folklore reference ==
The story features a depiction of the Sandman, a character from northern European folklore, who is said to sprinkle sand in the eyes of children to make them fall asleep. When, as a child, Nathanael asks his sister's elderly nurse about the Sandman, she gives him a more grisly account of the character:

"Don't you know that yet? He is a wicked man, who comes to children when they won't go to bed, and throws a handful of sand into their eyes, so that they start out bleeding from their heads. He puts their eyes in a bag and carries them to the crescent moon to feed his own children, who sit in the nest up there. They have crooked beaks like owls so that they can pick up the eyes of naughty human children."

== Interpretations ==
The horror in The Sandman does not begin with a monster. It begins in the way Nathanael remembers. His fear of losing his eyes stays with him. Freud called that kind of fear uncanny, when something hidden returns and makes the familiar feel strange. Todorov called stories like this fantastic because they never say what is real. They do not confirm. They just leave you caught in between. Kofman thought it was not about what Nathanael saw. It was about how easily his view of the world slipped. When the difference between real and not real starts to blur, everything else begins to slip too.

The characters and the conflict are first defined in the story's three opening letters. Furthermore, the psychological conflict of the protagonist, Nathanael, is represented, who is torn between hallucinations and reality. Nathanael struggles his whole life against post-traumatic stress which comes from a traumatic episode with the Sandman in his childhood experience. Until the end of the book it remains open whether this experience was real, or just a dream of the young Nathanael. The text clearly leaves the decision open inasmuch as it offers two understandings: that of Nathanael's belief that there is a dark power controlling him, and Clara's postulation (together with Lothar) against this that this is only a psychological element.

The story is partly a subjective description of the proceedings from Nathanael's viewpoint which, due to enormous psychological problems, is not likely objective—or possibly objectively portrayed. Hoffman consciously leaves the reader unsure. In this, the interpretation from an Enlightenment perspective makes sense against the Romantic view, whereby Clara represents the enlightenment and Nathanael the Romantics.

Of central importance is the "eyes" theme (interpreted by Freud in his 1919 essay "The Uncanny" as fear of castration), the "steps", the robot, and laughing. Hoffmann, well known for not conforming to society, manages to give a satirical critique of society here, which offers a lesson to both Enlightened scientists and Romantic "hoverers and floaters". Freud's psychoanalytic interpretation emphasizes that the uncanny is an aesthetic experience evoked for all by the text. Thus, a reading of this text with attention to the uncanny opens up aesthetic theory to include the mixed positive and negative aesthetic pleasures.

Kofman's reading of The Sandman is generative of literary theory. After offering a critique of the Freudian reading, she suggests that the uncanny is produced by blurring limits between real and unreal. She also reads authorial intent of Hoffmann as not to create literature that replicates existent reality, but to represent multiple "distorting eye-glasses" that are representative of different realities. Art, by this account, is not to replicate the real, but to create lifelike portraits without reference in a manner that the real is "tinged with madness" through the multiple perspectives enmeshed within.

The Coppelius/Coppola character can be considered not as a real physical character, but as a metaphor, like Nathanael does when he returns home. He represents the dark side within Nathanael. Note that the fight between Spallanzani and one or both of them for the "wooden doll" where we hear Coppelius's voice but see Coppola. There is also the motif of fists, where Coppelius is always described as having fists, but never hands.

== Themes ==
According to Suzanne Livingston, the story addresses themes of possession, hallucination, and breakdown.

The story keeps revolving around sight, and what it means when you cannot trust what you see. Nathanael's fear is not just about his eyes. It is about losing his grip on what is real. Warner and Castle both link this fear to machines that look human, but feel off in just the right way. Olimpia is the center of that whereas Clara is not.

Some, like Schmidt and Romero, say Clara stands outside the horror. Olimpia gets pulled into it. She does not speak. She does not move like others do. People keep watching her, and somehow that makes her feel less real and more disturbing.

== Influence and legacy ==
"The Sandman" continued to remain relevant. Poe's stories move through fear in ways that feel familiar, and the unravelling feels similar without copying Hoffmann. Freud included the story in his writing on the uncanny. He focused on the fear of losing one's eyes and on how something once familiar can suddenly feel wrong.

Other writers continued to take inspiration from the story. Some looked at the way the story slips. Things seem real, then they do not the next second. The ground keeps shifting. Olimpia remained part of that. She does not speak and she exists to be watched. People look at her and try to find something human. That reaction never stopped. It is still there when people talk about machines and what makes something feel alive.

== Adaptations ==
=== Opera and ballet ===
- 1852: La poupée de Nuremberg, an opéra comique, by Adolphe Adam
- 1870: Elements of the story were later adapted (very loosely) as the ballet Coppélia.
- 1881: It was also adapted as Act I of Offenbach's opera Les contes d'Hoffmann.
- 1896: La poupée, an opéra comique, by Edmond Audran
- 2002: Der Sandmann is the basis of the chamber opera The Sandman produced by Target Margin Theater in New York City; text by David Herskovits and Douglas Langworthy; music by Thomas Cabaniss.
- 2006: Der Sandmann, a ballet created for Stuttgarter Ballett, choreographed by Christian Spuck
- 2018: Sandmann, a ballet created for Oper Graz, choreographed by Andreas Heise, with music by Benjamin Rimmer

=== Film and TV ===
- 1919: Die Puppe, a 1919 German romantic comedy film, based on the operetta La poupée (see above).
- 1983: Der Sandmann, a German TV film by Dagmar Damek.
- 1991: "Der Sandmann" is the basis of the stop-motion animation film The Sandman, created by Paul Berry and nominated for an Oscar.
- 1992: Der Sandmann, a loose film adaptation by Eckhart Schmidt.
- 2000: The Sandman is a dance film made by the Brothers Quay and William Tuckett which is loosely based on E. T. A. Hoffmann's story.
- 2013: The episode "Mr. Sandman" from the occult detective TV series Grimm opens with a quote from the short story, and features a fly-like monster who blinds his victims and eats their tears.
- 2018: The Sandman was one of three Hoffmann tales featured in the October 2018 Russian animated feature Hoffmaniada.

=== Books ===
- 2009: A. S. Byatt's novel The Children's Book features a puppet-theatre performance of "Der Sandmann".

=== Comics ===
- 1970: Olimpia by Dino Battaglia, linus nr. 62
- 2014: Sandmann by Andrea Grosso Ciponte and Dacia Palmerino
- 2019: Sandmann by Michael Mikolajczak and Jacek Piotrowski
- 2019: Der Sandmann by Vitali Konstantinov

=== Other ===
- 2007: The Residents' album The Voice of Midnight is an updated re-telling of "Der Sandmann".
- 2018: The episode "Lights Out" from the horror podcast The Magnus Archives heavily references the short story.
- 2020: The short story is retold in a two-part episode of the Parcast podcast Tales.
