= The Serapion Brethren (story collection) =

1819–1821 story collection by E. T. A. Hoffmann

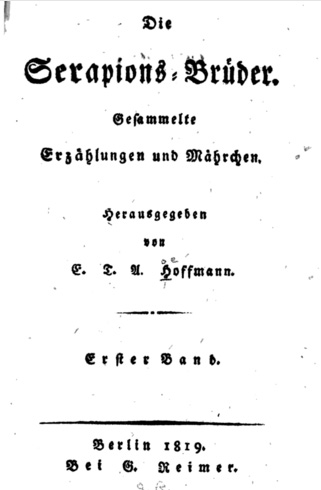
- Title page of the first volume, 1819
- Author: E. T. A. Hoffmann
- Original title: Die Serapionsbrüder
- Language: German
- Publisher: Verlag Georg Reimer
- Publication date: vol. 1: February 1819; vol. 2: February 1819; vol. 3: October 1820; vol. 4: Easter 1821
- Publication place: Prussia
- Pages: 2395

The Serapion Brethren (German: Die Serapionsbrüder) is a collection of stories by the Prussian writer E. T. A. Hoffmann, published in four volumes by Verlag Georg Reimer in 1819–1821. It mainly consists of previously published novellas and short stories and presents them within a frame story inspired by the real Serapion Brethren, a literary circle in Berlin. The form was admittedly inspired by Ludwig Tieck's Phantasus (1812–1817).

== Contents ==
A frame story portrays eight meetings of the six members of the Serapion Brethren: Ottmar, Theodor, Lothar, Cyprian, Vinzenz and Sylvester. They tell each other stories and discuss to what extent they adhere to the Serapiontic Principle.

First volume, February 1819, 604 pages

- "Foreword" (Vorwort)
- "The Story of Serapion" (Der Einsiedler Serapion)*
- "The Cremona Violin" (Rat Krespel)*
- "The Fermata" (Die Fermate)
- "The Poet and the Composer (Der Dichter und der Komponist)
- "A Fragment from the Life of Three Friends" (Ein Fragment aus dem Leben dreier Freunde)
- "The Arthus Hof" (Der Artushof)
- "The Mines of Falun" (Die Bergwerke zu Falun)
- "The Nutcracker and the Mouse King" (Nußknacker und Mausekönig)

Second volume, February 1819, 614 pages

- "The Contest of the Singers" (Der Kampf der Sänger)
- "A Ghost Story" (Eine Spukgeschichte)*
- "The Automata" (Die Automate)
- "The Doge and the Dogaressa" (Doge und Dogaresse)
- "Old and New Church Music" (Alte und neue Kirchenmusik)*
- "Master Martin, the Cooper, and His Journeyman" (Meister Martin der Küfner und seine Gesellen)
- "The Stranger Child" (Das fremde Kind)

Third volume, October 1820, 590 pages

- "The Life of a Well-known Character" (Nachricht aus dem Leben eines bekannten Mannes)*
- "The Choosing of the Bride" (Die Brautwahl)
- "The Uncanny Guest" (Der unheimliche Gast)
- "Mademoiselle de Scuderi" (Das Fräulein von Scuderi)
- "Gambler's Luck" (Spielerglück)
- "The Violin-Bow of the Baron de B" (Der Baron von B.)*

Fourth volume, Easter 1821, 587 pages

- "Signor Formica"
- "Zacharias Werner"
- "Erscheinungen"
- "The Interdependence of Things" (Der Zusammenhang der Dinge)
- "Vampirismus or Aurelia" (Vampirismus)*
- "Die ästhetische Teegesellschaft"*
- "The King's Bride" (Die Königsbraut)

* indicates a story that was published without a title in the original edition. Titles have been added by later editors.
