= Night Pieces =

1816–1817 story collection by E. T. A. Hoffmann

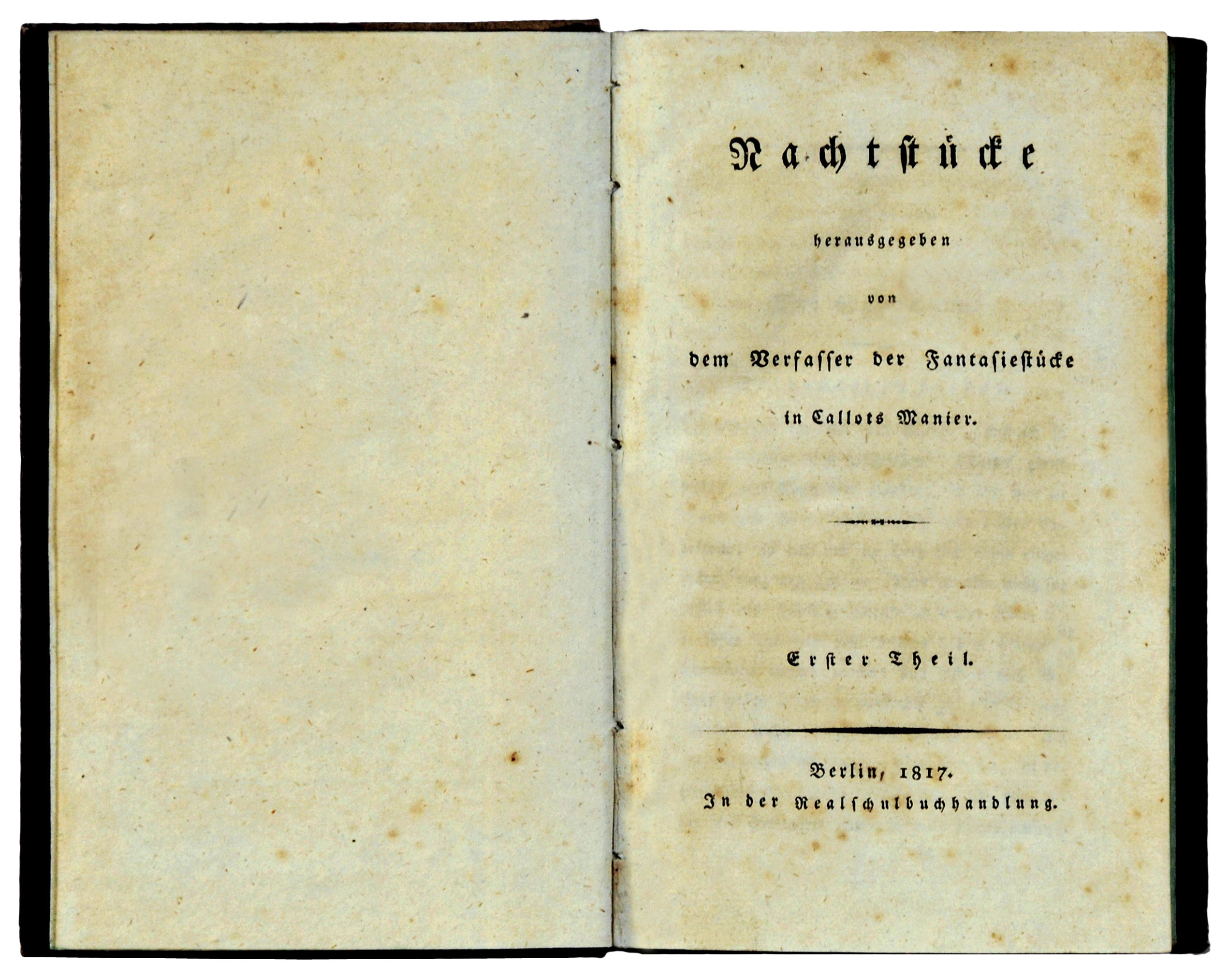
- Title page of the first volume, 1816
- Author: E. T. A. Hoffmann
- Original title: Nachtstücke
- Language: German
- Publisher: Verlag Georg Reimer
- Publication date: September 1816 (vol.1 ); summer 1817 (vol. 2)
- Publication place: Prussia
- Pages: 695

Night Pieces (German: Nachtstücke) is a collection of eight stories by the Prussian writer E. T. A. Hoffmann, published in two volumes in 1816 and 1817.

== Contents ==
First volume

- "The Sandman" (Der Sandmann)
- "Ignaz Denner"
- "The Jesuit Church at Glogau" (Die Jesuiterkirche in G.)
- "The Sanctus" (Das Sanctus)

Second volume

- "The Deserted House" (Das öde Haus)
- "The Entail" (Das Majorat)
- "The Vow" (Das Gelübde)
- "The Agate Heart" (Das steinerne Herz)

== Publication ==
Hoffmann began to work on Night Pieces in November 1815. It followed the model established with his previous collection Fantasy Pieces in Callot's Manner (1814–1815) and was presented on the title page as "published by the author of Fantasy Pieces in Callot's Manner" (German: herausgegeben von dem Verfaßer der Fantasiestücke in Callots Manier). It was published by Verlag Georg Reimer in Berlin. The first volume appeared in September 1816—with 1817 printed as its year—and the second in the summer of 1817.

== Reception ==
Although Fantasy Pieces in Callot's Manner had been successful, Night Pieces was largely ignored among Germans upon the publication. The first volume received a single, negative review in Allgemeine Literatur-Zeitung and the second received no printed reviews. In private correspondences, Heinrich Voß praised "The Sandman" as an inspired story but dismissed the rest of the collection for its "shudder and horror", and Johann Wolfgang von Goethe assumed it was a result of opium abuse. Night Pieces received a much more positive reception in Russia and France. Several of the individual stories eventually attracted significant analysis and "The Sandman" became one of Hoffmann's most famous works.
