= The Life and Opinions of the Tomcat Murr =

19th-century novel by E. T. A. Hoffmann

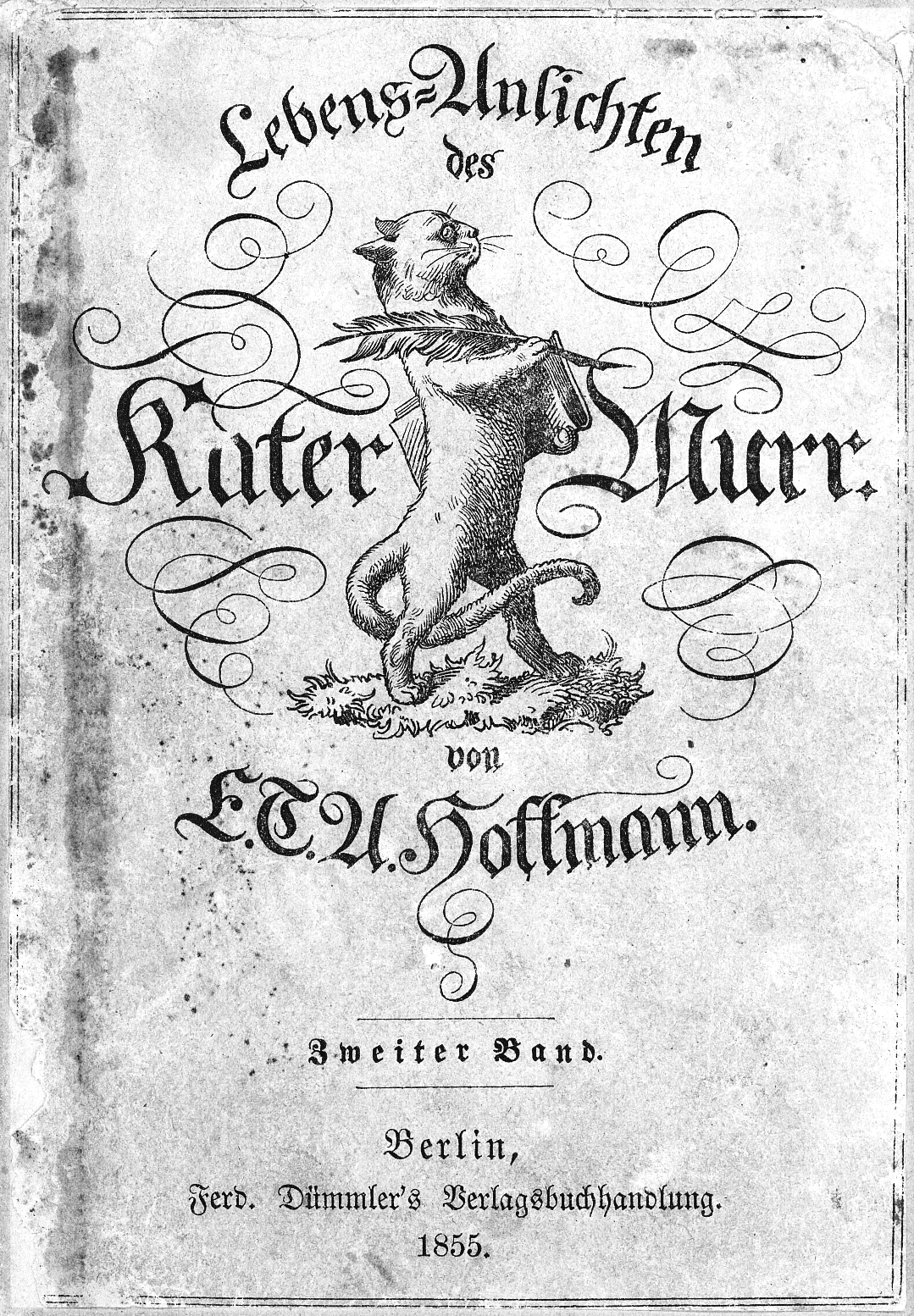
Cover of the second volume of the third German edition (1855)

The Life and Opinions of the Tomcat Murr Together with a Fragmentary Biography of Kapellmeister Johannes Kreisler on Random Sheets of Waste Paper (German: Lebens-Ansichten des Katers Murr nebst fragmentarischer Biographie des Kapellmeisters Johannes Kreisler in zufälligen Makulaturblättern) is a complex satirical novel by Prussian Romantic-era author E. T. A. Hoffmann. (Note: The title of the translation is reminiscent of The Life and Opinions of Tristram Shandy, Gentleman (1759–1767), the experimental novel by British writer Laurence Sterne.) It was first published in 1819–1821 as Lebens-Ansichten des Katers Murr nebst fragmentarischer Biographie des Kapellmeisters Johannes Kreisler in zufälligen Makulaturblättern, in two volumes. A planned third volume was never completed.

== Synopsis ==
The text of the book states it is the autobiography of a cat named Murr who has learned to write. The content of the book is therefore the life and work of the cat Murr, as written by Murr. However, in between Murr's autobiography, there are pages of a biography of another character, Johannes Kreisler.

== Reception ==
Jeffrey Ford described the novel as a "complex, truly wild fiction" where Hoffmann "pieced together the fragments of his own shattered psyche and commented on the relationship of art and artists to society."

== English translations ==
An English translation by Anthea Bell was published in 1999 by Penguin Classics.
