= E. T. A. Hoffmann =

German author (1776–1822)

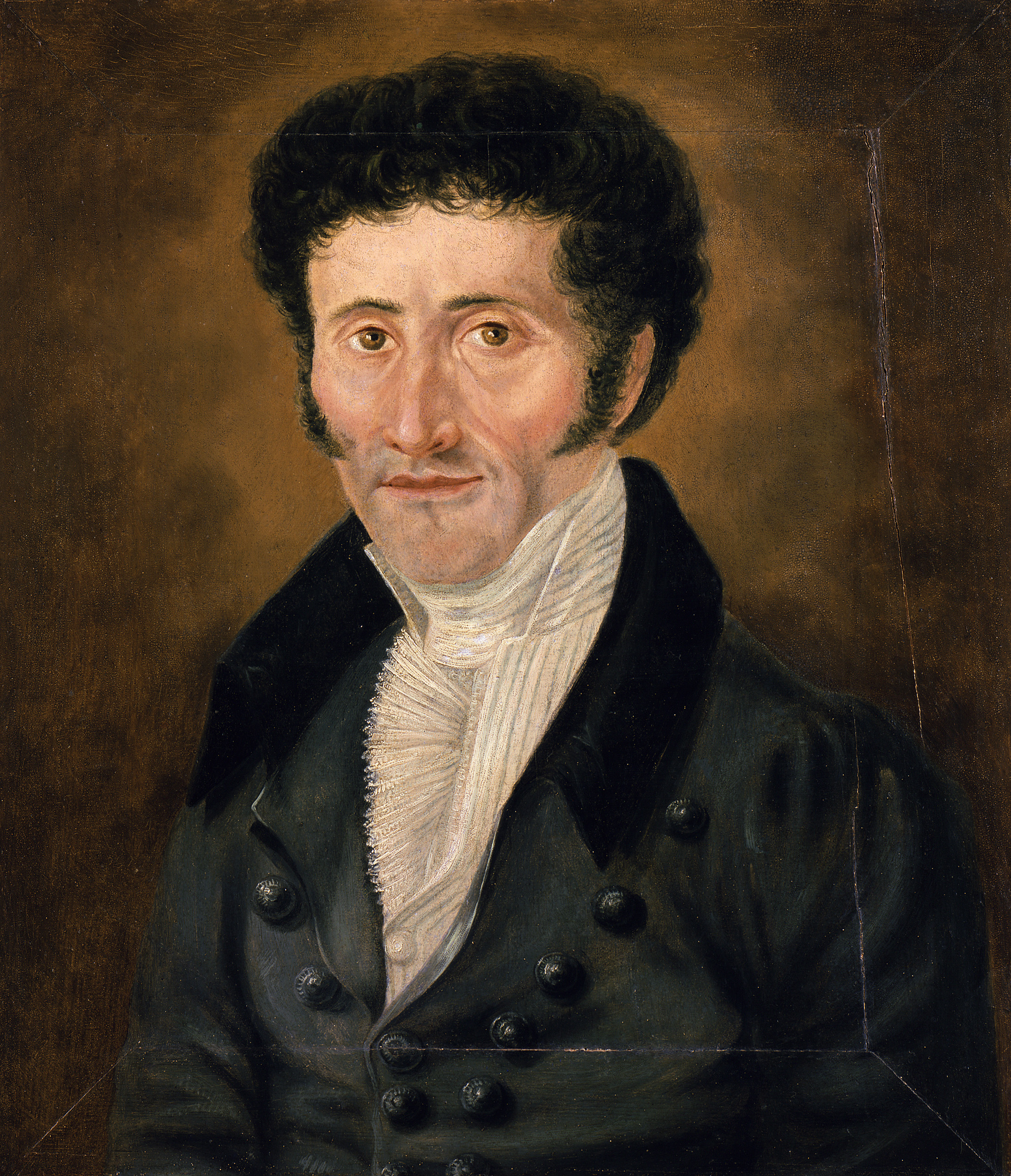
- Self-portrait
- Born: Ernst Theodor Wilhelm Hoffmann; 24 January 1776; Königsberg, Prussia
- Died: 25 June 1822 (aged 46); Berlin, Prussia
- Resting place: Cemetery No. III of the congregations of Jerusalem Church and New Church, Berlin-Kreuzberg
- Education: University of Königsberg
- Occupations: Jurist-counsel; writer; composer; music critic and director; artist
- Writing career
- Pen name: E. T. A. Hoffmann
- Language: German
- Years active: 1809–1822
- Period: Modern (19th century)
- Genres: Novel; novella; short story; fairytale fantasy; play; libretto; essay; diary
- Notable work: Bibliography
- Movements: German Romanticism; Dark Romanticism

Signature
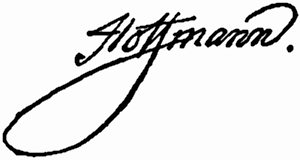

Ernst Theodor Amadeus Hoffmann (born Ernst Theodor Wilhelm Hoffmann; 24 January 1776 – 25 June 1822) was a German Romantic author of fantasy and gothic horror, a jurist, composer, music critic and artist. His short story "The Sandman" is seen as a pioneering work of horror fiction, while his novella Mademoiselle de Scuderi is regarded as one of the earliest examples of crime fiction.

Several of his works have been reimagined in other media: He is the author of the novella The Nutcracker and the Mouse King, on which Pyotr Ilyich Tchaikovsky's ballet The Nutcracker is based. In addition, his stories form the basis of Jacques Offenbach's opera The Tales of Hoffmann, in which Hoffmann appears (heavily fictionalized) as the hero. The ballet Coppélia is based on two other stories that Hoffmann wrote, while Schumann's Kreisleriana is based on Hoffmann's character Johannes Kreisler.

Hoffmann's stories highly influenced 19th-century literature, and he is one of the major authors of the Romantic movement.

== Life ==
=== Youth ===
Hoffmann's ancestors, both maternal and paternal, were jurists. His father, Christoph Ludwig Hoffmann (1736–97), was a barrister in Königsberg, Prussia (now Kaliningrad, Russia), as well as a poet and amateur musician who played the viola da gamba. In 1767, Christoph married his cousin, Lovisa Albertina Doerffer (1748–96). Ernst Theodor Wilhelm, born on 24 January 1776, was the youngest of three children, of whom the second died in infancy.

When his parents separated in 1778, his father went to Insterburg (now Chernyakhovsk) with his elder son, Johann Ludwig Hoffmann (1768–1822), while Hoffmann's mother stayed in Königsberg with her relatives: two aunts, Johanna Sophie Doerffer (1745–1803) and Charlotte Wilhelmine Doerffer (c. 1754–79) and their brother, Otto Wilhelm Doerffer (1741–1811), who were all unmarried. The trio raised the youngster.

The household, dominated by the uncle (whom Ernst nicknamed O Weh—"Oh dear!"—in a play on his initials "O.W."), was pietistic and uncongenial. Hoffmann was to regret his estrangement from his father. Nevertheless, he remembered his aunts with great affection, especially the younger, Charlotte, whom he nicknamed Tante Füßchen ("Aunt Tootsy-Wootsy"). Although she died when he was only three years old, he treasured her memory (a character in Hoffmann's Lebensansichten des Katers Murr is named after her) and embroidered stories about her to such an extent that later biographers sometimes assumed her to be imaginary, until proof of her existence was found after World War II.

Between 1781 and 1792, he attended the Lutheran school or Burgschule, where he made good progress in classics. Ernst showed great talent for piano-playing, and busied himself with writing and drawing. The provincial setting was not, however, conducive to technical progress, and despite his many-sided talents he remained rather ignorant of both classical forms and of the new artistic ideas that were developing in Germany. He had, however, read Schiller, Goethe, Swift, Sterne, Rousseau and Jean Paul, and wrote part of a novel titled Der Geheimnisvolle.

Around 1787, he became friends with Theodor Gottlieb von Hippel the Younger (1775–1843), the son of a pastor, and nephew of Theodor Gottlieb von Hippel the Elder, the well-known writer friend of Immanuel Kant. During the year 1792, both attended some of Kant's lectures at the University of Königsberg. Their friendship, although often tested by an increasing social difference, was to be lifelong.

In 1794, Hoffmann became enamored of Dora Hatt, a married woman to whom he had given music lessons. She was ten years older, and gave birth to her sixth child in 1795. In February 1796, her family protested against his attentions and, with his hesitant consent, asked another of his uncles to arrange employment for him in Glogau, Prussian Silesia (now Głogów, Poland).

=== The provinces ===
From 1796, Hoffmann obtained employment as a clerk for his uncle, Johann Ludwig Doerffer, who lived in Glogau with his daughter Minna. After passing further examinations he visited Dresden, where he was amazed by the paintings in the gallery, particularly those of Correggio and Raphael. During the summer of 1798, his uncle was promoted to a court in Berlin, and the three of them moved there in August—Hoffmann's first residence in a large city. It was there that Hoffmann first attempted to promote himself as a composer, writing an operetta called Die Maske and sending a copy to Queen Luise of Prussia. The official reply advised to him to write to the director of the Royal Theatre, a man named Iffland. By the time the latter responded, Hoffmann had passed his third round of examinations and had already left for Posen (Poznań) in South Prussia in the company of his old friend Hippel, with a brief stop in Dresden to show him the gallery.

From June 1800 to 1803, he worked in Prussian provinces in the area of Greater Poland and Masovia. This was the first time he had lived without supervision by members of his family, and he started to become "what school principals, parsons, uncles, and aunts call dissolute."

His first job, at Posen, was endangered after Carnival on Shrove Tuesday 1802, when caricatures of military officers were distributed at a ball. It was immediately deduced who had drawn them, and complaints were made to authorities in Berlin, who were reluctant to punish the promising young official. The problem was solved by "promoting" Hoffmann to Płock in New East Prussia, the former capital of Poland (1079–1138), where administrative offices were relocated from Thorn (Toruń). He visited the place to arrange lodging, before returning to Posen where he married Mischa (Maria or Marianna Thekla Michalina Rorer, whose Polish surname was Trzcińska). They moved to Płock in August 1802.

Hoffmann despaired because of his exile, and drew caricatures of himself drowning in mud alongside ragged villagers. He did make use, however, of his isolation, by writing and composing. He started a diary on 1 October 1803. An essay on the theatre was published in Kotzebue's periodical, Die Freimüthige, and he entered a competition in the same magazine to write a play. Hoffmann's was called Der Preis ("The Prize"), and was itself about a competition to write a play. There were fourteen entries, but none was judged worthy of the award: 100 Friedrichs d'or. Nevertheless, his entry was singled out for praise. This was one of the few good times of a sad period of his life, which saw the deaths of his uncle J. L. Hoffmann in Berlin, his Aunt Sophie, and Dora Hatt in Königsberg.

At the beginning of 1804, he obtained a post at Warsaw. On his way there, he passed through his hometown and met one of Dora Hatt's daughters. He was never to return to Königsberg.

=== Warsaw ===
Hoffmann assimilated well with Polish society; the years spent in Prussian Poland he recognized as the happiest of his life. In Warsaw he found the same atmosphere he had enjoyed in Berlin, renewing his friendship with Zacharias Werner, and meeting his future biographer, a neighbour and fellow jurist called Julius Eduard Itzig (who changed his name to Hitzig after his baptism). Itzig had been a member of the Berlin literary group called the Nordstern, or "North Star", and he gave Hoffmann the works of Novalis, Ludwig Tieck, Achim von Arnim, Clemens Brentano, Gotthilf Heinrich von Schubert, Carlo Gozzi and Calderón. These relatively late introductions marked his work profoundly.

He moved in the circles of August Wilhelm Schlegel, Adelbert von Chamisso, Friedrich de la Motte Fouqué, Rahel Levin and David Ferdinand Koreff.

But Hoffmann's fortunate position was not to last: on 28 November 1806, during the War of the Fourth Coalition, Napoleon Bonaparte's troops captured Warsaw, and the Prussian bureaucrats lost their jobs. They divided the contents of the treasury between them and fled. In January 1807, Hoffmann's wife and two-year-old daughter Cäcilia returned to Posen, while he pondered whether to move to Vienna or go back to Berlin. A delay of six months was caused by severe illness. Eventually the French authorities demanded that all former officials swear allegiance or leave the country. As they refused to grant Hoffmann a passport to Vienna, he was forced to return to Berlin. He visited his family in Posen before arriving in Berlin on 18 June 1807, hoping to further his career there as an artist and writer.

=== Berlin and Bamberg ===
The next fifteen months were some of the worst in Hoffmann's life. The city of Berlin was also occupied by Napoleon's troops. Obtaining only meagre allowances, he had frequent recourse to his friends, constantly borrowing money and still going hungry for days at a time; he learned that his daughter had died. Nevertheless, he managed to compose his Six Canticles for a cappella choir: one of his best compositions, which he would later attribute to Kreisler in Lebensansichten des Katers Murr.

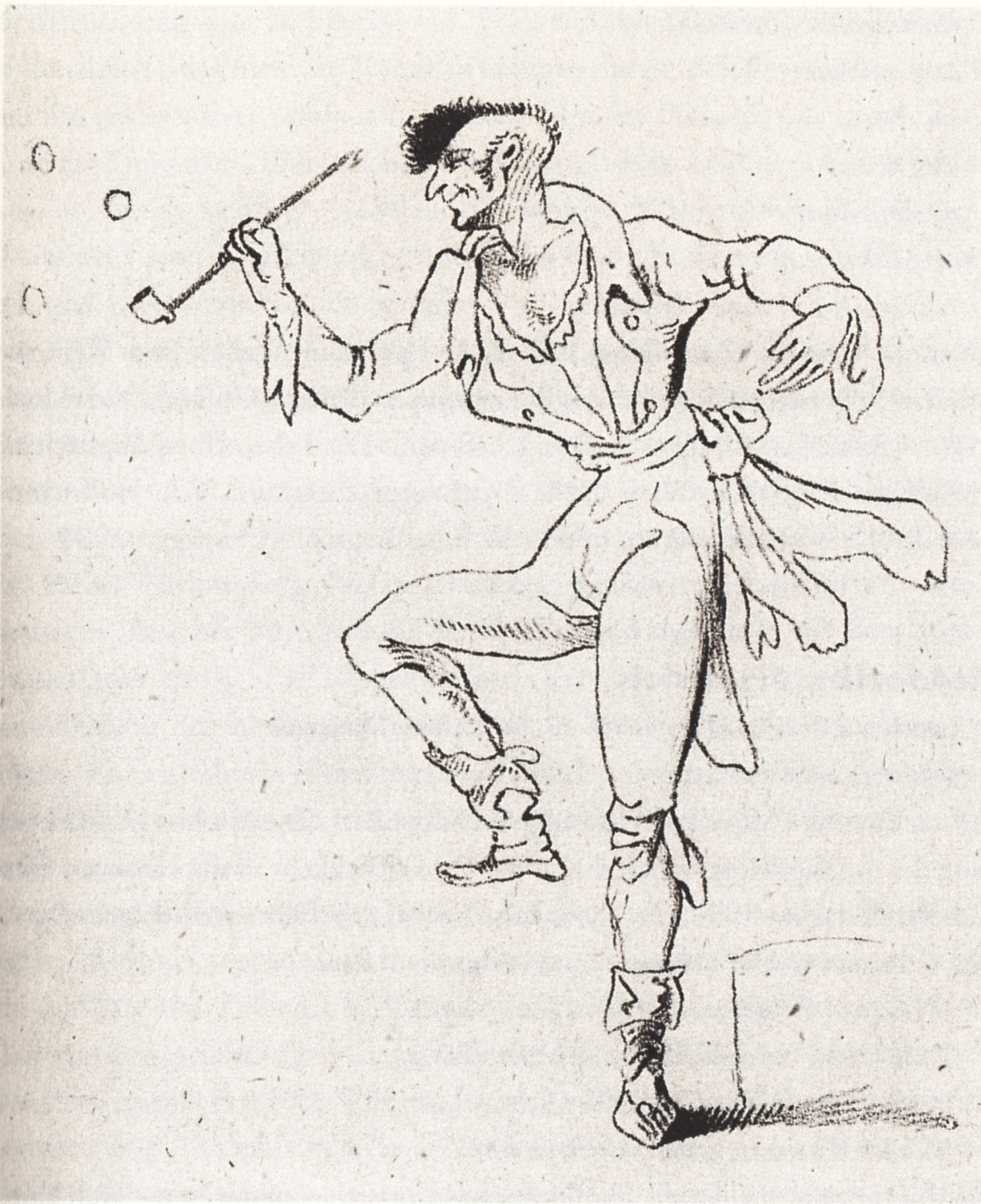
Hoffmann's portrait of Kapellmeister Kreisler

On 1 September 1808 he arrived with his wife in Bamberg, where he began a job as theatre manager. The director, Count Soden, left almost immediately for Würzburg, leaving a man named Heinrich Cuno in charge. Hoffmann was unable to improve standards of performance, and his efforts caused intrigues against him which resulted in him losing his job to Cuno. He began work as music critic for the Allgemeine musikalische Zeitung, a newspaper in Leipzig, and his articles on Beethoven were especially well received, and highly regarded by the composer himself. It was in its pages that the "Kapellmeister Johannes Kreisler" character made his first appearance.

Hoffmann's breakthrough came in 1809, with the publication of Ritter Gluck, a story about a man who meets, or believes he has met, the composer Christoph Willibald Gluck (1714–87) more than twenty years after the latter's death. The theme alludes to the work of Jean Paul, who invented the term Doppelgänger the previous decade, and continued to exact a powerful influence over Hoffmann, becoming one of his earliest admirers. With this publication, Hoffmann began to use the pseudonym E. T. A. Hoffmann, telling people that the "A" stood for Amadeus, in homage to the composer Wolfgang Amadeus Mozart (1756–91). However, he continued to use Wilhelm in official documents throughout his life, and the initials E. T. W. also appear on his gravestone.

The next year, he was employed at the Bamberg Theatre as stagehand, decorator, and playwright, while also giving private music lessons. He became so enamored of a young singing student, Julia Marc, that his feelings were obvious whenever they were together, and Julia's mother quickly found her a more suitable match. When Joseph Seconda offered Hoffmann a position as musical director for his opera company (then performing in Dresden), he accepted, leaving on 21 April 1813.

=== Dresden and Leipzig ===
Prussia had declared war against France on 16 March during the War of the Sixth Coalition, and their journey was fraught with difficulties. They arrived on the 25th, only to find that Seconda was in Leipzig; on the 26th, they sent a letter pleading for temporary funds. That same day Hoffmann was surprised to meet Hippel, whom he had not seen for nine years.

The situation deteriorated, and in early May Hoffmann tried in vain to find transport to Leipzig. On 8 May, the bridges were destroyed, and his family were marooned in the city. During the day, Hoffmann would roam, watching the fighting with curiosity. Finally, on 20 May, they left for Leipzig, only to be involved in an accident which killed one of the passengers in their coach and injured his wife.

They arrived on 23 May, and Hoffmann started work with Seconda's orchestra, which he found to be of the best quality. On 4 June an armistice began, which allowed the company to return to Dresden. But on 22 August, after the end of the armistice, the family was forced to relocate from their pleasant house in the suburbs into the town, and during the next few days the Battle of Dresden raged. The city was bombarded; many people were killed by bombs directly in front of him. After the main battle was over, he visited the gory battlefield. His account can be found in Vision auf dem Schlachtfeld bei Dresden. After a long period of continued disturbance, the town surrendered on 11 November, and on 9 December the company travelled to Leipzig.

On 25 February, Hoffmann quarrelled with Seconda, and the next day he was given notice of twelve weeks. When asked to accompany them on their journey to Dresden in April, he refused, and they left without him. But during July his friend Hippel visited, and soon he found himself being guided back into his old career as a jurist.

=== Berlin ===
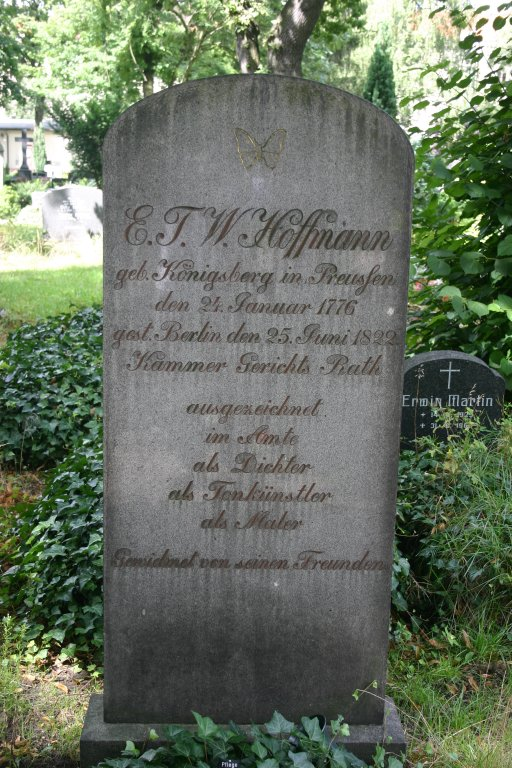
Grave of E. T. A. Hoffmann. Translated, the inscription reads: E. T. W. Hoffmann, born on 24 January 1776, in Königsberg, died on 25 June 1822, in Berlin, Councillor of the Court of Justice, excellent in his office, as a poet, as a musician, as a painter, dedicated by his friends.

At the end of September 1814, in the wake of Napoleon's defeat, Hoffmann returned to Berlin and succeeded in regaining a job at the Kammergericht, the chamber court. His opera Undine was performed by the Berlin Theatre. Its successful run came to an end only after a fire on the night of the 25th performance. Magazines clamoured for his contributions, and after a while his standards started to decline. Nevertheless, many masterpieces date from this time.

During the period from 1819, Hoffmann was involved with legal disputes, while fighting ill health. Alcohol abuse and syphilis eventually caused weakening of his limbs during 1821, and paralysis from the beginning of 1822. His last works were dictated to his wife or to a secretary.

Prince Metternich's anti-liberal programs began to put Hoffmann in situations that tested his conscience. Thousands of people were accused of treason for having certain political opinions, and university professors were monitored during their lectures.

King Frederick William III of Prussia appointed an Immediate Commission for the investigation of political dissidence; when he found its observance of the rule of law too frustrating, he established a Ministerial Commission to interfere with its processes. The latter was greatly influenced by Commissioner Kamptz. During the trial of "Turnvater" Jahn, the founder of the gymnastics association movement, Hoffmann found himself annoying Kamptz, and became a political target. When Hoffmann caricatured Kamptz in a story (Meister Floh), Kamptz began legal proceedings. These ended when Hoffmann's illness was found to be life-threatening. The King asked for a reprimand only, but no action was ever taken. Eventually Meister Floh was published with the offending passages removed.

=== Death ===
Hoffmann died of respiratory paralysis due to neurosyphilis in Berlin on 25 June 1822 at the age of 46. He had acquired the infection, which went untreated, in 1807. His grave is preserved in the Protestant Cemetery No. III of the congregations of Jerusalem Church and New Church (German: Friedhof III der Jerusalems- und Neuen Kirchengemeinde) in Berlin-Kreuzberg, south of Hallesches Tor at the underground station Mehringdamm.

== Assessment ==
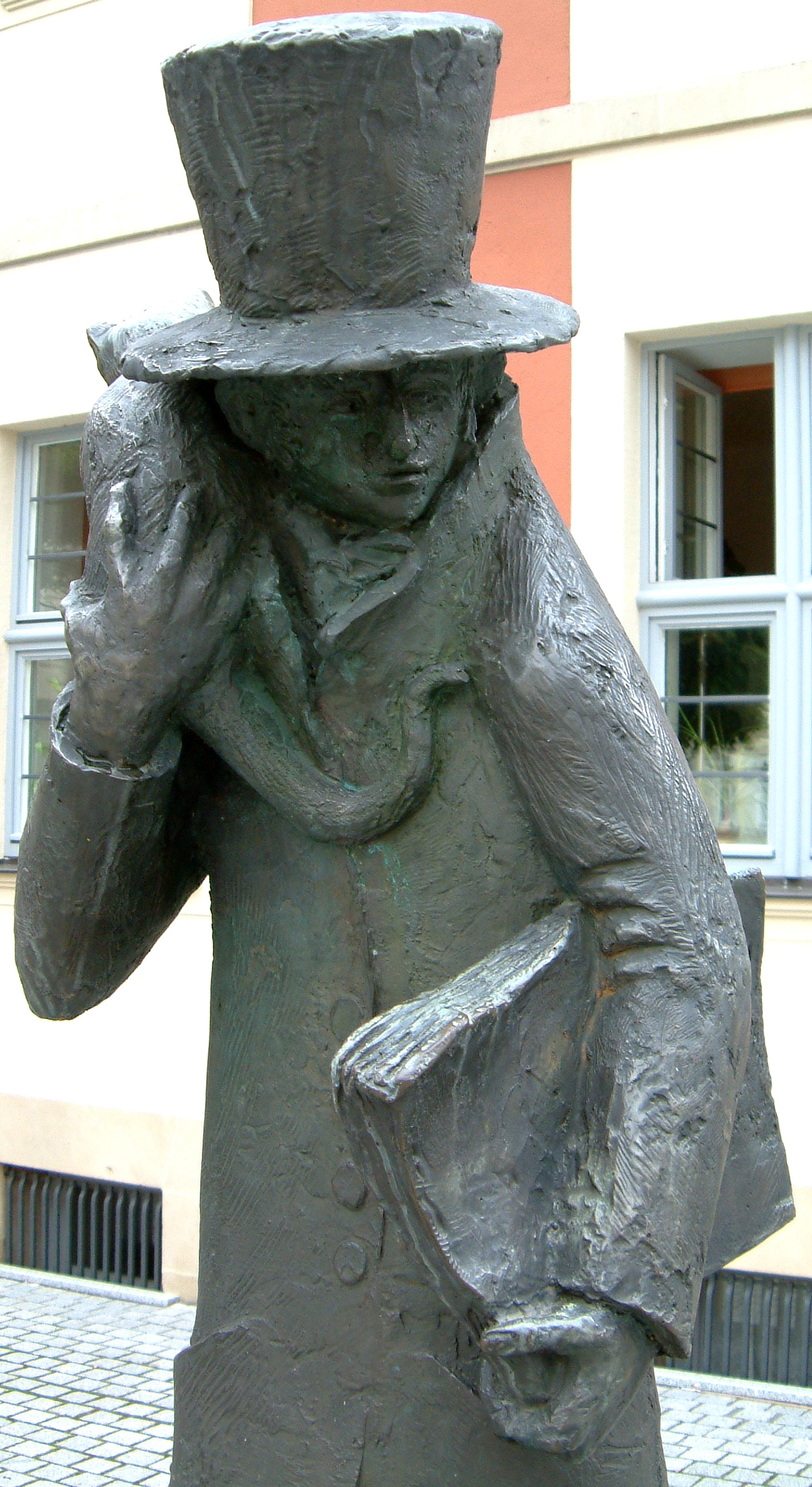
Statue of "E. T. A. Hoffmann and his cat" in Bamberg

Hoffmann is one of the best-known representatives of German Romanticism, and a pioneer of the fantasy genre, with a taste for the macabre combined with realism that influenced such authors as Edgar Allan Poe (1809–1849), Nikolai Gogol (1809–1852), Charles Dickens (1812–1870), Charles Baudelaire (1821–1867), George MacDonald (1824–1905), Fyodor Dostoevsky (1821–1881), Vernon Lee (1856–1935), Franz Kafka (1883–1924) and Alfred Hitchcock (1899–1980). Hoffmann's story Das Fräulein von Scuderi is sometimes cited as the first detective story and a direct influence on Poe's "The Murders in the Rue Morgue"; Characters from it also appear in the opera Cardillac by Paul Hindemith.

The twentieth-century Russian literary theorist Mikhail Bakhtin characterised Hoffmann's works as Menippean Satire, essentially satirical and self-parodying in form, thus including him in a tradition that includes Cervantes, Diderot and Voltaire.

Robert Schumann's piano suite Kreisleriana (1838) takes its title from one of Hoffmann's books (and according to Charles Rosen's The Romantic Generation, is possibly rather inspired by The Life and Opinions of Tomcat Murr, in which Kreisler appears). Jacques Offenbach's masterwork, the opera Les contes d'Hoffmann ("The Tales of Hoffmann", 1881), is based on the stories, principally "Der Sandmann" ("The Sandman", 1816), "Rat Krespel" ("Councillor Krespel", 1818), and "Das verlorene Spiegelbild" ("The Lost Reflection") from Die Abenteuer der Silvester-Nacht (The Adventures of New Year's Eve, 1814). Klein Zaches genannt Zinnober (Little Zaches called Cinnabar, 1819) inspired an aria as well as the operetta Le Roi Carotte (1872). Pyotr Ilyich Tchaikovsky's ballet The Nutcracker (1892) is based on "The Nutcracker and the Mouse King", and the ballet Coppélia, with music by Delibes, is based on two eerie Hoffmann stories.

Hoffmann also influenced 19th-century musical opinion directly through his music criticism. His reviews of Beethoven's Symphony No. 5 in C minor, Op. 67 (1808) and other important works set new literary standards for writing about music, and encouraged later writers to consider music as "the most Romantic of all the arts." Hoffmann's reviews were first collected for modern readers by Friedrich Schnapp, ed., in E.T.A. Hoffmann: Schriften zur Musik; Nachlese (1963) and have been made available in an English translation in E.T.A. Hoffmann's Writings on Music, Collected in a Single Volume (2004).

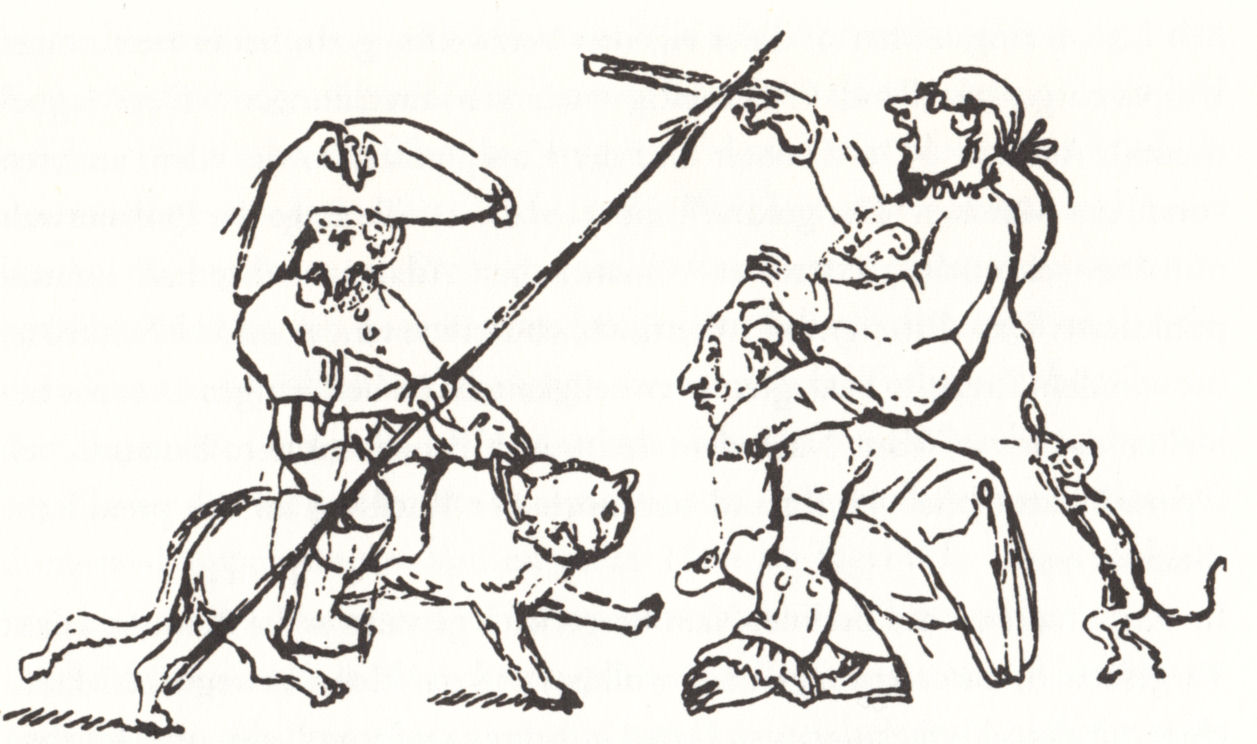
Hoffmann's drawing of himself, riding on Tomcat Murr and fighting "Prussian bureaucracy"

Hoffmann strove for artistic polymathy. He created far more in his works than mere political commentary achieved through satire. His masterpiece novel Lebensansichten des Katers Murr (The Life and Opinions of Tomcat Murr, 1819–1821) deals with such issues as the aesthetic status of true artistry and the modes of self-transcendence that accompany any genuine endeavour to create. Hoffmann's portrayal of the character Kreisler (a genius musician) is wittily counterpointed with the character of the tomcat Murr – a virtuoso illustration of artistic pretentiousness that many of Hoffmann's contemporaries found offensive and subversive of Romantic ideals.

Hoffmann's literature indicates the failings of many artists to differentiate between the superficial and the authentic aspects of such Romantic ideals. The self-conscious effort to impress must, according to Hoffmann, be divorced from the self-aware effort to create. This essential duality in Kater Murr is conveyed structurally through a discursive "splicing together" of two biographical narratives.

=== Science fiction ===
While disagreeing with E. F. Bleiler's claim that Hoffmann was "one of the two or three greatest writers of fantasy", Algis Budrys of Galaxy Science Fiction said that he "did lay down the groundwork for some of our most enduring themes".

Historian Martin Willis argues that Hoffmann's impact on science fiction has been overlooked, saying "his work reveals a writer dynamically involved in the important scientific debates of the late eighteenth and early nineteenth centuries." Willis points out that Hoffmann's work is contemporary with Frankenstein (1818) and with "the heated debates and the relationship between the new empirical science and the older forms of natural philosophy that held sway throughout the eighteenth century." His "interest in the machine culture of his time is well represented in his short stories, of which the critically renowned The Sandman (1816) and Automata (1814) are the best examples. ...Hoffmann's work makes a considerable contribution to our understanding of the emergence of scientific knowledge in the early years of the nineteenth century and to the conflict between science and magic, centred mainly on the 'truths' available to the advocates of either practice. ...Hoffmann's balancing of mesmerism, mechanics, and magic reflects the difficulty in categorizing scientific knowledge in the early nineteenth century."

== Works ==
=== Literary ===
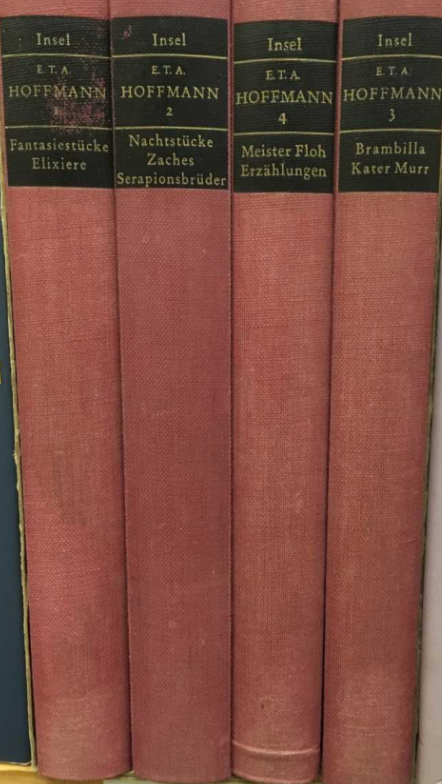
Four volume set of Hoffmann's writings

- Fantasiestücke in Callots Manier (collection of previously published stories, 1814)
  - "Ritter Gluck", "Kreisleriana", "Don Juan", "Nachricht von den neuesten Schicksalen des Hundes Berganza"
  - "Der Magnetiseur", "Der goldne Topf" (revised in 1819), "Die Abenteuer der Silvesternacht"
- Die Elixiere des Teufels (1815)
- Nachtstücke (1817)
  - "Der Sandmann", "Das Gelübde", "Ignaz Denner", "Die Jesuiterkirche in G."
  - "Das Majorat", "Das öde Haus", "Das Sanctus", "Das steinerne Herz"
- Seltsame Leiden eines Theater-Direktors (1819)
- Little Zaches (1819)
- Die Serapionsbrüder (1819)
  - "Der Einsiedler Serapion", "Rat Krespel", "Die Fermate", "Der Dichter und der Komponist"
  - "Ein Fragment aus dem Leben dreier Freunde", "Der Artushof", "Die Bergwerke zu Falun", "Nußknacker und Mausekönig" (1816)
  - "Der Kampf der Sänger", "Eine Spukgeschichte", "Die Automate", "Doge und Dogaresse"
  - "Alte und neue Kirchenmusik", "Meister Martin der Küfner und seine Gesellen", "Das fremde Kind"
  - "Nachricht aus dem Leben eines bekannten Mannes", "Die Brautwahl", "Der unheimliche Gast"
  - "Das Fräulein von Scuderi", "Spielerglück" (1819), "Der Baron von B."
  - "Signor Formica", "Zacharias Werner", "Erscheinungen"
  - "Der Zusammenhang der Dinge", "Vampirismus", "Die ästhetische Teegesellschaft", "Die Königsbraut"
- Prinzessin Brambilla (1820)
- Lebensansichten des Katers Murr (1820)
- "Die Irrungen" (1820)
- "Die Geheimnisse" (1821)
- "Die Doppeltgänger" (1821)
- Meister Floh (1822)
- "Des Vetters Eckfenster" (1822)
- Letzte Erzählungen (1825)

=== Musical ===
==== Vocal music ====
- Mass in D minor (1805)
- Trois Canzonettes à 2 et à 3 voix (1807)
- 6 Canzoni per 4 voci alla capella (1808)
- Miserere in B Minor (1809)
- In des Irtisch weiße Fluten (Kotzebue), Lied (1811)
- Recitative and Aria Prendi l'acciar ti rendo (1812)
- Tre Canzonette italiane (1812)
- 6 Italian Duets (1812)
- Nachtgesang, Türkische Musik, Jägerlied, Katzburschenlied für Männerchor (1819–21)

==== Works for stage ====
- Die Maske (libretto by Hoffmann), Singspiel (1799)
- Die lustigen Musikanten (libretto: Clemens Brentano), Singspiel (1804)
- Incidental music to Zacharias Werner's tragedy Das Kreuz an der Ostsee (1805)
- Liebe und Eifersucht (libretto by Hoffmann after Calderón, translated by August Wilhelm Schlegel) (1807)
- Arlequin, ballet (1808)
- Der Trank der Unsterblichkeit (libretto: Julius von Soden), romantic opera (1808)
- Wiedersehn! (libretto by Hoffmann), prologue (1809)
- Dirna (libretto: Julius von Soden), melodrama (1809)
- Incidental music to Julius von Soden's drama Julius Sabinus (1810)
- Saul, König von Israel (libretto: Joseph von Seyfried), melodrama (1811)
- Aurora (libretto: Franz von Holbein), heroic opera (1812)
- Undine (libretto: Friedrich de la Motte Fouqué), Zauberoper (1816)
- Der Liebhaber nach dem Tode (unfinished)

==== Instrumental ====
- Rondo für Klavier (1794/95)
- Overture and Music for the Church in D minor (Ouvertura. Musica per la chiesa d-moll) (1801)
- Piano Sonatas: A major, F♯ minor, F major, F minor, C♯ minor (1805–1808)
- Grand Fantasy for Piano (Große Fantasie für Klavier) (1806)
- Symphony in E♭ Major (1806)
- Harp Quintet in C minor (1807)
- Grand Trio in E Major (1809)
- Walzer zum Karolinentag (1812)
- Teutschlands Triumph in der Schlacht bei Leipzig, (by "Arnulph Vollweiler", 1814; lost)
- Serapion's Waltz (1818–1821)

== In popular culture ==
- Robertson Davies includes Hoffmann as a character (with the pet name of 'ETAH') trapped in Limbo, in his novel The Lyre of Orpheus (1988).
- Alexandre Dumas, père translated The Nutcracker into French, which aided in making the tale popular and widespread.
- The exotic and supernatural elements in the storyline of Ingmar Bergman's 1982 film Fanny and Alexander derive largely from the stories of Hoffmann.
- Freud gives an extensive psychoanalytic analysis of Hoffmann's "The Sandman" in his 1919 essay Das Unheimliche.
- Coppelius is a German classical metal band whose name is taken from a character in Hoffmann's "The Sandman". The band's 2010 album Zinnober includes a track titled "Klein Zaches".
- The Russian show Puppets was cancelled by government officials after an episode in which Vladimir Putin was portrayed as Hoffmann's Klein Zaches.

== See also ==
- The Tales of Hoffmann for Offenbach's opera.
- The Tales of Hoffmann for the film
- Gofmaniada, a Russian puppet-animated feature film about Hoffmann and several of his stories.
- German science fiction literature

== Sources ==
- Jaffé, Aniela (1978). Bilder und Symbole aus E. T. A. Hoffmann's Märchen "Der Goldne Topf" (in German) (2nd ed.). Gerstenberg Verlag Hildesheim.
