= Paul Berry (animator) =

British animator (1961–2001)

- Born: March 13, 1961
- Died: June 26, 2001 (aged 40)
- Occupation: Animator

Paul Thomas Berry (13 March 1961 – 26 June 2001) was a British stop-motion animator who first worked on Cosgrove Hall's Wind in the Willows before directing the 1991 Oscar-nominated short horror stop-motion animation film The Sandman. In 1992, the film was awarded the Craft Prize for Best Animation at Ottawa International Animation Festival.

== Career ==
Other projects Paul Berry worked on included The Nightmare Before Christmas (animator), James and the Giant Peach (animation supervisor), Monkeybone (supervising animator) and the music video for Primus' cover of "The Devil Went Down to Georgia".

== Death ==
On 26 June 2001 Berry died of a brain tumour. He had stayed strong for several months prior to his death. He was 40 years old.
