= 1809 in literature =

Events from the year 1809 in literature.

== Events ==
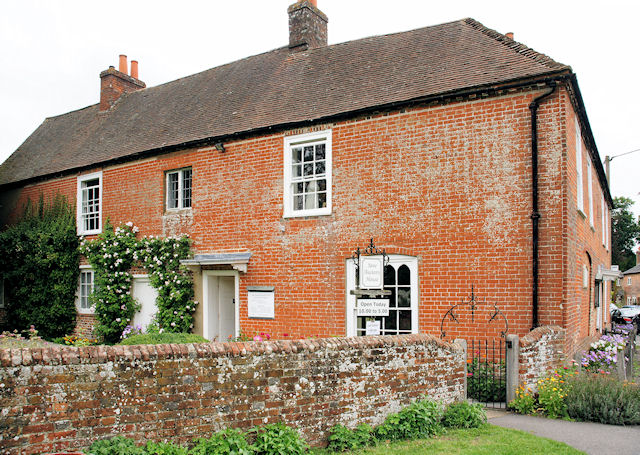
Chawton Cottage

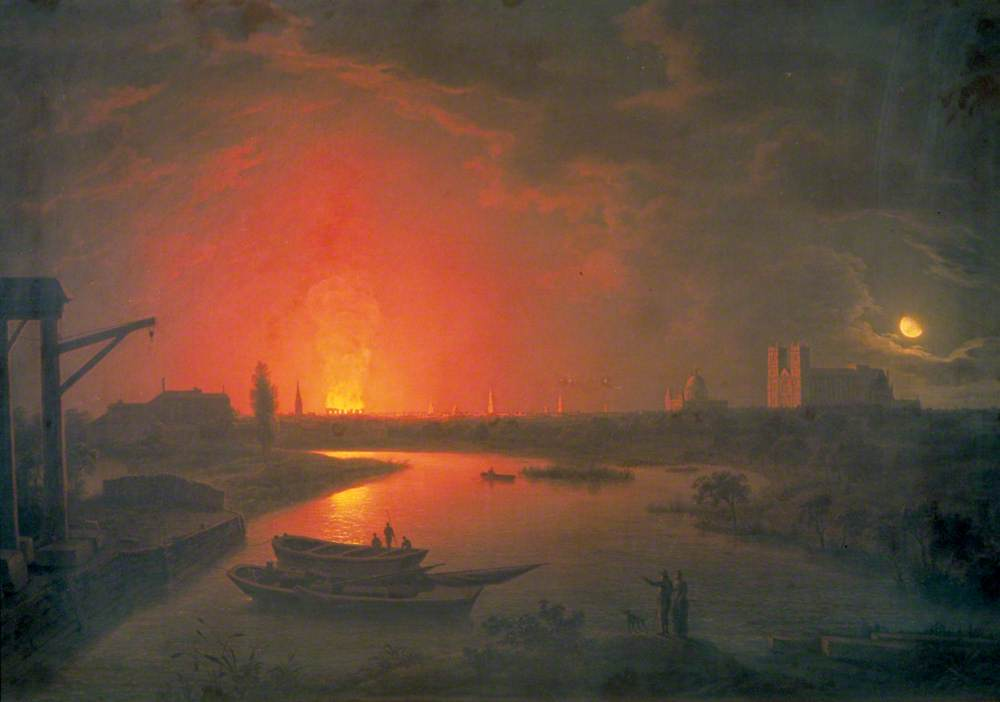
Old Drury Lane Theatre on Fire by Abraham Pether, 1809

- February 24 – The Theatre Royal, Drury Lane, London, is destroyed by fire. When found drinking wine in the street while watching the conflagration, Richard Brinsley Sheridan, the proprietor, is reported as saying: "A man may surely be allowed to take a glass of wine by his own fireside." The putative manuscript of The History of Cardenio may have been lost in the blaze.
- March 1 – The literary and political periodical The Quarterly Review is first published by John Murray in London.
- June 1 – Samuel Taylor Coleridge founds The Friend, a weekly periodical which runs for some 25 issues.
- July 7 – Jane Austen settles with her sister and mother at Chawton Cottage in Chawton, near Alton, Hampshire and she resumes writing regularly.
- September 18 – A new Theatre Royal, Covent Garden, London, opens to replace the first, which burnt down in 1808. The first play performed is Macbeth. Raised ticket prices cause the Old Price Riots, which last for 64 days, until the manager, John Philip Kemble, reverses the increases.
- Uncertain dates
  - The Walnut Street Theatre, Philadelphia, United States, is opened as "The New Circus" by the Circus of Pepin and Breschard. It becomes the oldest continually operating playhouse in the English-speaking world and the oldest in the United States.
  - William Combe begins publication of the verse Tour of Dr Syntax in search of the Picturesque in Ackermann's Political Magazine (London), illustrated by Thomas Rowlandson, satirising William Gilpin's views on the picturesque.

== New books ==
=== Fiction ===
- Thomas Campbell – Gertrude of Wyoming
- François-René de Chateaubriand – Les Martyrs
- Richard Cumberland – John de Lancaster
- Catherine Cuthbertson – Romance of the Pyrenees
- Thomas Frognall Dibdin – Bibliomania; or Book-Madness: a bibliographical romance
- Maria Edgeworth – Ennui and Manœuvering
- E. M. Foster – The Corinna of England, and a Heroine in the Shade: A Modern Romance
- Johann Wolfgang von Goethe – Elective Affinities (Die Wahlverwandtschaften)
- Stéphanie Félicité, Comtesse de Genlis – Alphonso
- Anne Grant – Memoirs of an American Lady
- Sarah Green – Tales of the Manor
- E. T. A. Hoffmann - Ritter Gluck
- Washington Irving – A History of New-York from the Beginning of the World to the End of the Dutch Dynasty, by Diedrich Knickerbocker
- Ivan Krylov – Basni (Fables)
- Catherine Manners – The Lords of Erith
- Mary Meeke – Laughton Priory
- Hannah More – Coelebs in Search of a Wife
- Mary Pilkington – The Mysterious Orphan
- Anna Maria Porter – Don Sebastian
- Shikitei Sanba (式亭 三馬) – Ukiyoburo (publication begins)
- Louisa Stanhope – The Age We Live In
- Elizabeth Thomas – Monte Video

=== Drama ===
- William Dimond – The Foundling of the Forest
- Richard Leigh – Grieving's a Folly
- Heinrich von Kleist – Die Hermannschlacht
- Adam Oehlenschläger – Palnatoke

=== Poetry ===
- John Wilson Croker – The Battles of Talavera

=== Non-fiction ===
- Jacob Boehme – De la Triple Vie de l'homme (translated into French by Louis Claude de Saint-Martin)
- Lord Byron – English Bards and Scotch Reviewers
- James Stanier Clarke and John McArthur – The Life of Lord Nelson
- Jean-Baptiste Lamarck – Philosophie Zoologique
- John Roberton – A Treatise on Medical Police, and on Diet, Regimen, &c

== Births ==
- January 19 – Edgar Allan Poe, American poet, short story writer and literary critic (died 1849)
- March 6 – David Bates, American poet (died 1870)
- March 31
  - Edward Fitzgerald, English poet (died 1883)
  - Nikolai Gogol, Russian dramatist, novelist and short story writer (died 1852)
- June 3 – Margaret Gatty, English children's writer (died 1873)
- June 13 – Heinrich Hoffmann, German author and children's poet (died 1894)
- June 19 – Monckton Milnes, English man of letters, poet and politician (died 1885)
- August 6 – Alfred Tennyson, English poet (died 1892)
- August 29 – Oliver Wendell Holmes Sr., American poet (died 1894)
- September 7 – Wilhelmina Gravallius, Swedish novelist (died 1884)
- November 27 – Fanny Kemble, English actress (died 1893)
- unknown date – George Ayliffe Poole, English writer and cleric (died 1883)

== Deaths ==
- January 3 – Richard Shepherd, English theologian (born c. 1732)
- February – John Andrews, English historical writer and pamphleteer (born 1736)
- March 11 – Hannah Cowley, English dramatist and poet (born 1743)
- March 23 – Thomas Holcroft, English dramatist and miscellanist (born 1745)
- March 25 – Anna Seward, English poet (born 1747)
- June 8 – Thomas Paine, English political theorist (born 1737)
- August 8 – Ueda Akinari, Japanese writer (born 1734)
- August 29 – Lucy Barnes, American writer (born 1780)
- October 19 – Jean-Henri Gourgaud, French actor (born 1746)
- December 20 – Joseph Johnson, English publisher (born 1738)
- December 21 – Tiberius Cavallo, Italian physicist and natural philosopher (born 1749)
- December 23 – József Fabchich, Hungarian translator of Greek poetry and lexicographer (born 1753)
