= John Andrews =

John Andrews may refer to:

== Sports ==
- John Andrews (baseball) (born 1949), American baseball pitcher
- John Andrews (cyclist) (1934–2000), British cyclist
- John Andrews (footballer, born 1950), English footballer
- John Andrews (footballer, born 1978), Irish footballer and manager
- John Andrews (tennis) (born 1952), tennis player from the United States
- John "Tiny" Andrews (1951–2015), American football defensive tackle
- John Andrews (American football) (born 1948), American football tight end

== Politicians ==
- John Andrews (Colorado politician) (born 1944), state senator, 1998–2005
- Jack Andrews (John Lawson Ormrod Andrews, 1903–1986), Northern Irish politician
- J. M. Andrews (John Miller Andrews, 1871–1956), Northern Irish politician
- John T. Andrews (politician) (1803–1894), U.S. Representative from New York
- John Andrews (New Zealand politician) (1892–1983), Mayor of Lower Hutt, New Zealand
- John Andrews (Maine politician), state representative (2018–2024)

== Military ==
- John Andrews (Medal of Honor) (c. 1821–?), U.S. Navy sailor awarded the Medal of Honor for actions during the Korean Expedition
- John Oliver Andrews (1896–1989), English World War I flying ace

== Writers ==
- John Andrews (historical writer) (1736–1809), historical writer and pamphleteer
- John Andrews (poet), English poet
- John Arthur Andrews (1865–1903), Australian anarchist journalist
- John Williams Andrews (1898–1975), journalist, public relations professional and author
- John Andrews (writer, born 1936), crime (as John Malcolm) and antiques writer
- John G. Andrews, pen name of Emma Huntington Nason (1845–1921), American writer and composer

== Religious figures ==
- J. N. Andrews (John Nevins Andrews, 1829–1883), Seventh-day Adventist leader
- John Andrews (priest) (1746–1813), Colonial American clergyman

== Others ==
- John Andrews (architect) (1933–2022), architect for the CN Tower in Toronto and Gund Hall at Harvard University
  - John Andrews Building at the University of Toronto Scarborough
- John Bertram Andrews (1880–1943), American economist
- John T. Andrews (geologist) (born 1937), professor of geological and atmospheric and oceanic sciences
- John Andrews, conductor The Brook Street Band

== See also ==
- John Andrew (disambiguation)
