= Nelson and the Bear =

Painting by Richard Westall

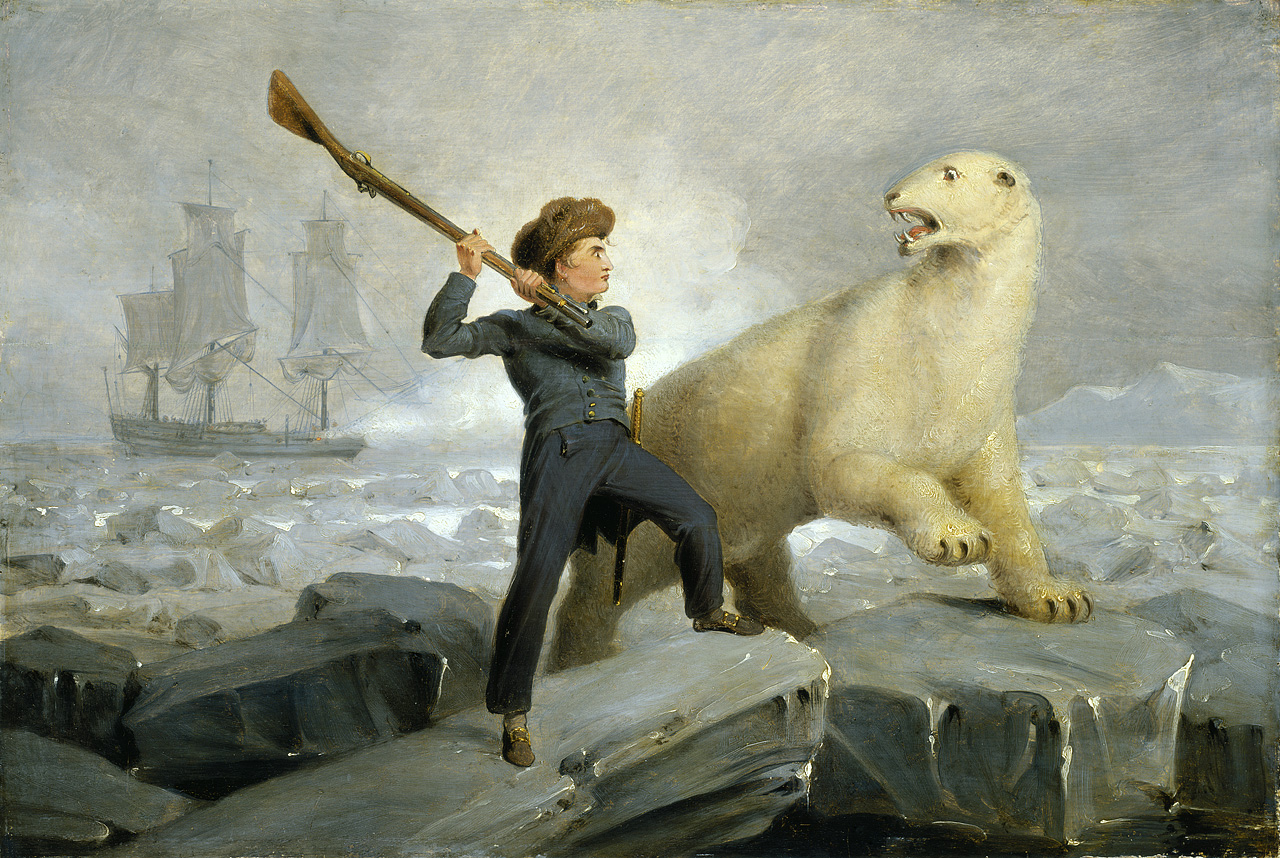
- Artist: Richard Westall
- Year: 1809
- Type: Oil on oak panel, history painting
- Dimensions: 36.8 cm × 55.8 cm (14.5 in × 22.0 in)
- Location: National Maritime Museum; Greenwich, London

Nelson and the Bear is an 1809 painting by the British artist Richard Westall. It depicts an incident in 1773 involving Horatio Nelson, then a fifteen-year-old midshipman accompanying a polar expedition to try and find the Northeast Passage. Nelson and a friend were at one point attacked by a polar bear. Nelson's musket misfired and he reversed it to try to beat the bear off with the butt end. His life was likely saved when the ice split in two separating him from the animal. In the background is the bomb vessel HMS Carcass on which Nelson was a crewmember. One of the ship's guns is seen firing in an attempt to scare off the bear. It omits the presence of Nelson's comrade, showing him confidently standing up to the bear alone.

The painting was commissioned by John McArthur and an engraving made from it by John Landseer. It was then included as one of the illustrations in the two-volume book The Life of Lord Nelson (1809), one of the first biographies of Lord Horatio Nelson, which McArthur co-authored with James Stanier Clarke. The painting is in the collection of the National Maritime Museum in Greenwich.

== See also ==
- Portrait of Horatio Nelson by William Beechey, 1801

== Bibliography ==
- Broglio, Ron. Beasts of Burden: Biopolitics, Labor, and Animal Life in British Romanticism. State University of New York Press, 2017.
- Hill, Jen. White Horizon: The Arctic in the Nineteenth-Century British Imagination. State University of New York Press, 2009.
