= Thomas Alphonso Hayley =

English sculptor (1780–1800)

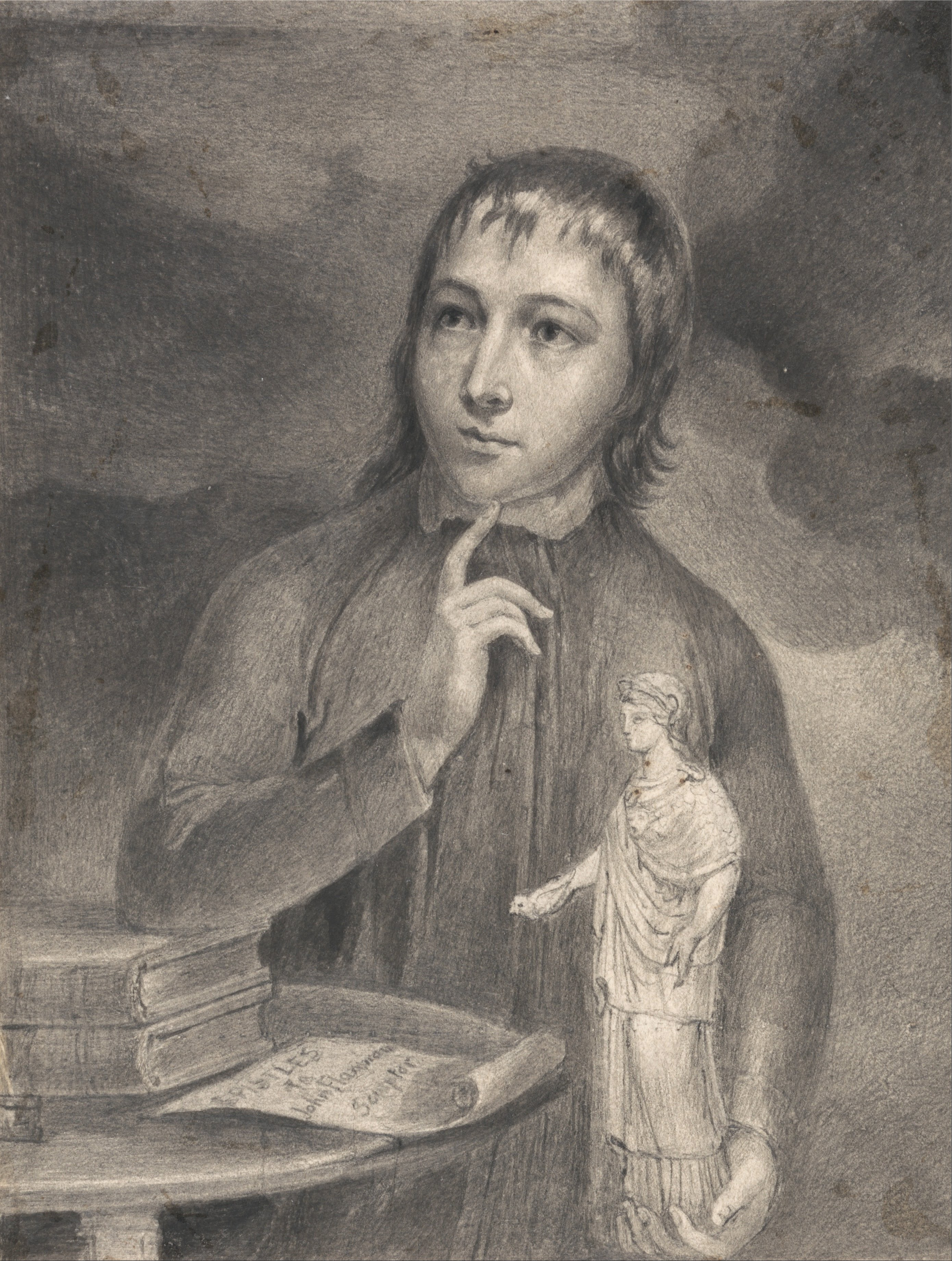
- Drawing of Hayley by William Blake
- Born: 5 October 1780
- Died: 2 May 1800 (aged 19); Felpham, Sussex, England
- Resting place: Eartham, Sussex, England
- Known for: English sculptor

Thomas Alphonso Hayley (5 October 1780 – 2 May 1800) was an English sculptor.

== Life ==
Hayley, the natural son of William Hayley, was born in 1780, and showed in 1794 signs of a love for sculpture. He was encouraged to learn drawing by Joseph Wright of Derby, and having attracted the attention of the painter George Romney, and of John Flaxman, was in 1795 articled to Flaxman as a resident pupil for three years. He appears to have shown much promise, even experimenting in oil-painting. In 1798, however, he showed symptoms of ill-health, arising from curvature of the spine, and was compelled to return to his father's cottage at Felpham in Sussex, where, after two years of suffering, he died on 2 May 1800. He was buried nearby at Eartham; his monument there was carved and erected by Flaxman, with an epitaph composed by his father.

Hayley modelled busts of Flaxman, Lord Thurlow, and James Stanier Clarke. A medallion by him of Romney was engraved by Caroline Watson for his father's Life of Romney. In his father's Essays on Sculpture (1800), there are a portrait of young Hayley from a medallion by Flaxman, and a drawing by him of The Death of Demosthenes, both engraved by William Blake. His father wrote many sonnets to his memory.
