= John Andrew =

John Andrew may refer to:

== Politicians ==
- John Andrew (Wallingford MP), MP for Wallingford, 1360
- John Andrew (Cricklade MP), MP for Cricklade, 1378–1388
- John Andrew (Cambridgeshire MP), MP for Cambridgeshire, 1383
- John Andrew (Ipswich MP), MP for Ipswich (1442, 1449) and Bletchingley (Nov 1449)
- John Albion Andrew (1818–1867), governor of Massachusetts
- John Andrew (Australian politician) (1819–1902), member of the Victorian Parliament between 1877 and 1880
- John Chapman Andrew (1822–1907), New Zealand politician
- John F. Andrew (1850–1895), U.S. representative from Massachusetts
- Neil Andrew (John Neil Andrew, born 1944), Australian politician

== Religion ==
- John Andrew (archdeacon) (fl. 1798–1799), British Anglican priest
- John Andrew (priest, born 1931) (1931–2014), British-American Anglican priest, rector of St. Thomas Church, Manhattan

== Sport ==
- John Andrew (rugby union, born 1870) (1870–1911), South African international rugby union player
- John Andrew (rugby league) (fl. 1960–1962), Australian rugby league player
- John Andrew (rugby union, born 1993), Irish rugby union player

== Others ==
- John Andrew (engraver), English engraver and printmaker; see Louis Prang
- John Andrew (trade negotiator) (1896–1968), New Zealand farmer and trade negotiator

== See also ==
- John Andrews (disambiguation)
- John Andrew Wilson (fl. 1921–1938), member of the Legislative Assembly of Saskatchewan
