= James Stanier Clarke =

English cleric and writer (1766–1834)

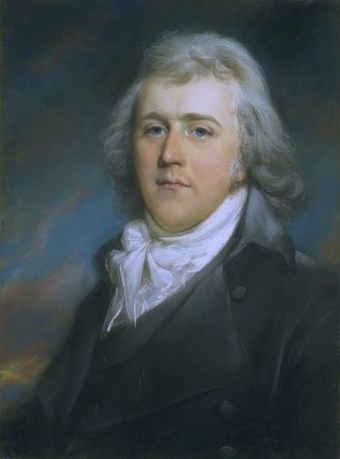
James Stanier Clarke

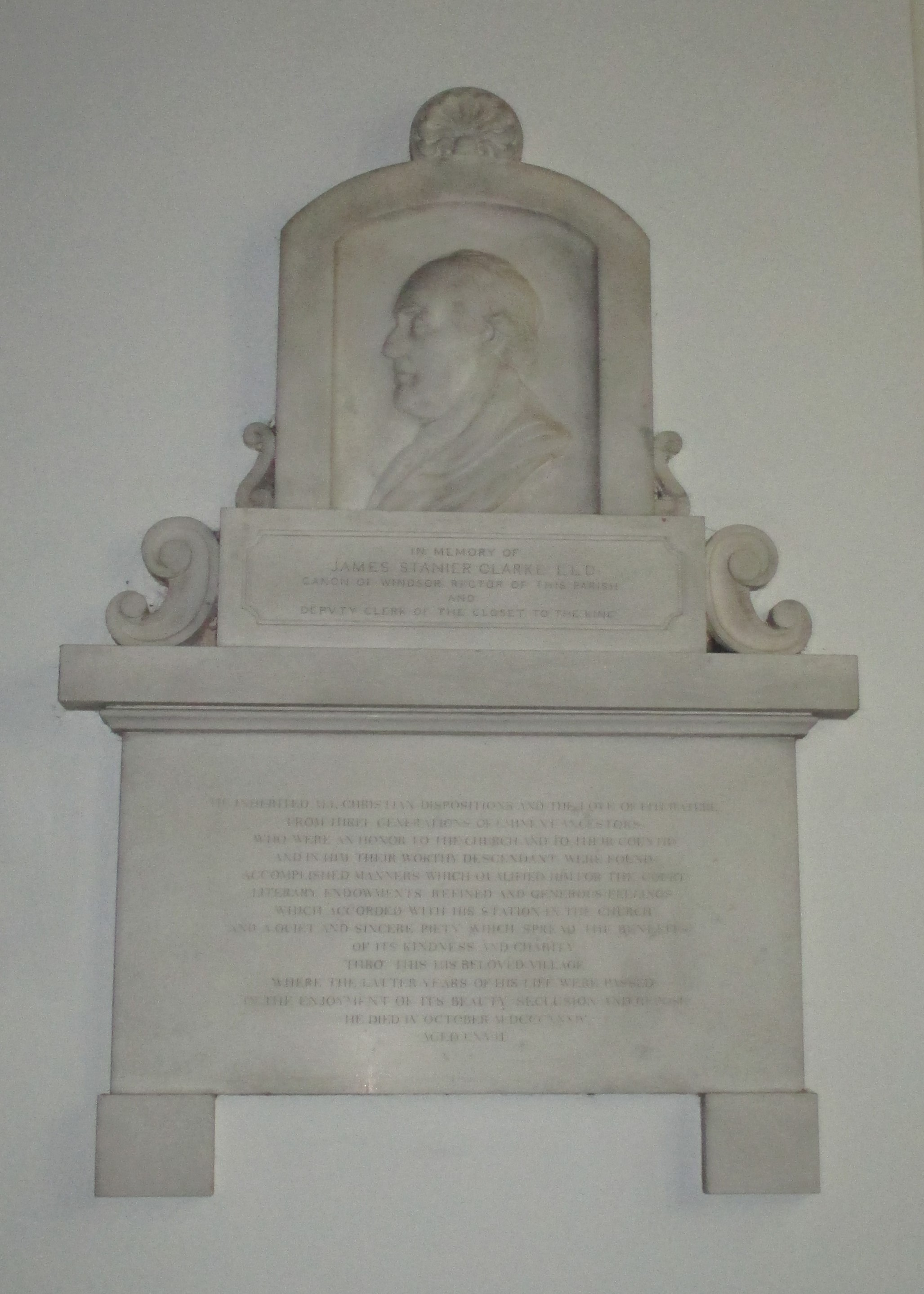
Memorial tablet to Clarke in All Hallows Church, Tillington, West Sussex

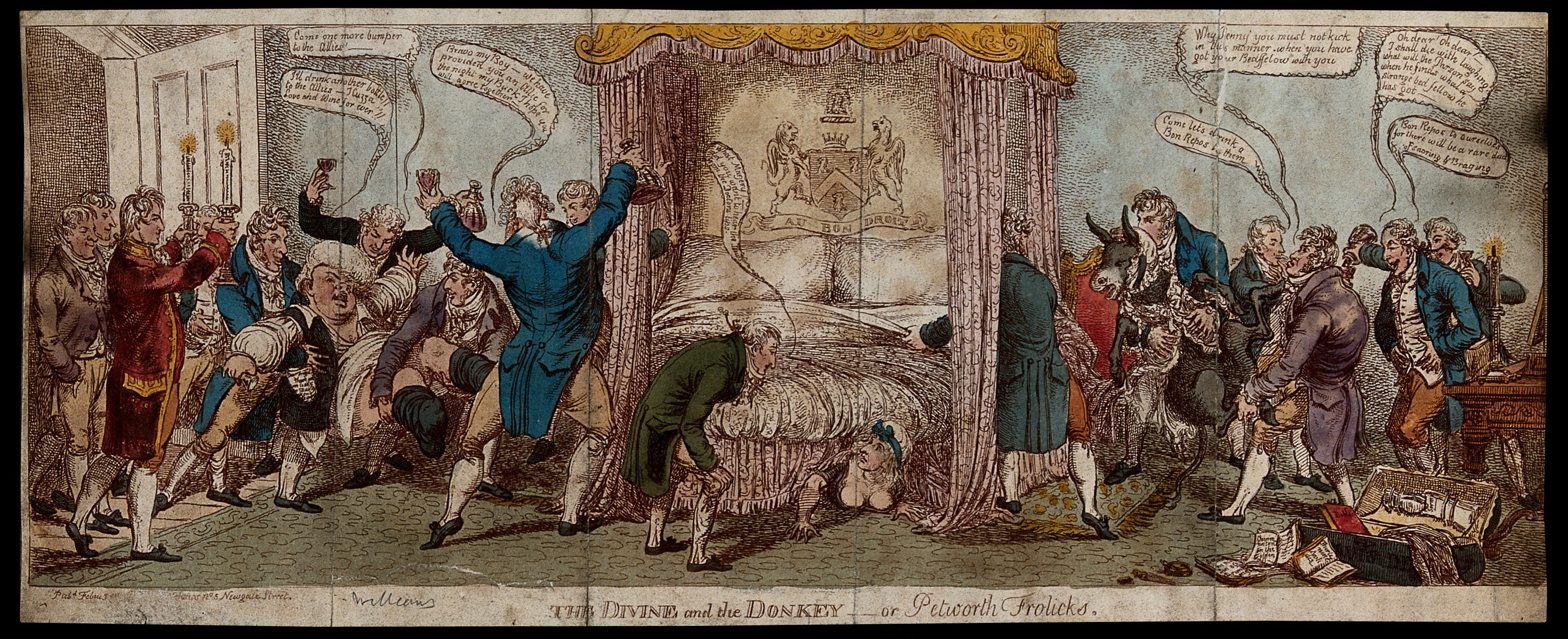
Satirical print from 1814, The Divine and the Donkey–or Petworth Frolicks against George (the Prince Regent) and James Stanier Clarke. A drunken parson is being put to bed with an ass-foal wrapped in a petticoat, a prank after celebrations of the battle of Leipzig. The parson is identified in the Oxford Dictionary of National Biography as Clarke: he was being 'punished' for setting up an assignation with a servant-girl. The incident at Petworth House was real, but the presence of George seems to be fictional.

James Stanier Clarke (1766 – 4 October 1834) was an English cleric, naval author and man of letters. In 1799, he became the librarian to the Prince of Wales.

== Early life ==
The eldest son of Edward Clarke and Anne Grenfield, and brother of Edward Daniel Clarke, he was born on 17 December 1766 at Mahon, Minorca where his father was at the time chaplain to the governor. He was educated at Uckfield School and then at Tonbridge School under Vicesimus Knox. Matriculating at St John's College, Cambridge in 1784, he did not complete a first degree.

Having taken holy orders, Clarke was in 1790 appointed to the rectory of Preston, Sussex. About the beginning of 1791 he was living in Sussex with his mother, taking in the refugee Anthony Charles Cazenove for half a year. In 1792 he was living at Eartham with William Hayley; Thomas Alphonso Hayley made a bust of him.

== Courtier ==
Clarke in February 1795 entered the Royal Navy as a chaplain; and served, 1796–99, on board HMS Impetueux in the Channel fleet, under the command of captain John Willett Payne, by whom he was introduced to George, Prince of Wales. It was the end of his service afloat, after George appointed him his domestic chaplain and librarian.

In 1806, Clarke took the degree of Bachelor of Laws (LLB) at Cambridge, and in 1816 the further degree of Legum Doctor (LLD) was conferred on him per literas regias. George had him made historiographer to the king on the death of Louis Dutens in 1812. He was also a Fellow of the Royal Society.

From 1815 for a short period Clarke was in contact with Jane Austen about her novel-writing: they were introduced by Austen's friend the surgeon Charles Thomas Haden. Having shown Austen round the library at Carlton House in November, and arranged that George should have Emma dedicated to him, Clarke also made suggestions in correspondence for Austen's future writing. These she mocked in the satirical manuscript Plan of a Novel, According to Hints from Various Quarters, not published in her lifetime.

Clarke was installed canon of Windsor, 19 May 1821; and was Deputy Clerk of the Closet to the king. The canonry came about by compromise between George IV (as George had become) and Robert Jenkinson, 2nd Earl of Liverpool the Prime Minister, in a clash over preferment for Charles Sumner. Under a deal struck, Sumner took on Clarke's royal appointments.

Clarke died on 4 October 1834.

== Works ==
In 1798, Clarke published a volume of Sermons preached in the Western Squadron during its services off Brest, on board HM ship Impetueux (1798; 2nd edit. 1801). With John McArthur, a purser in the navy and secretary to Samuel Hood, 1st Viscount Hood at Toulon, he started the Naval Chronicle, a monthly magazine of naval history and biography, which ran for twenty years. In 1803 he published the first volume of The Progress of Maritime Discovery, which was not continued. He issued in 1805 Naufragia, or Historical Memoirs of Shipwrecks (3 vols.). Its subtitle "of the Providential Deliverance of Vessels" reflects its traditional content, harking back to James Janeway.

In 1809, with McArthur, Clarke published his major work, The Life of Lord Nelson (2 vols.; 2nd edit. 1840). It mixed official and private letters, and made questionable use of its sources. Robert Southey criticised it destructively in the Quarterly Review, a culmination of his literary feud with Clarke that led also to Southey writing his own Nelson biography.

In 1816, Clarke published a Life of King James II, from the Stuart MSS. in Carlton House (2 vols.). The work contains portions of the king's autobiography, the original of which is now lost; in the Dictionary of National Biography it was considered to be the work of Lewis Innes, where Clarke attributed it to his brother Thomas Innes. A modern scholarly view is that the work was written in two parts by different Jacobite courtiers, the first part (to 1677) being by John Caryll, the second by William Dicconson. David Nairne assisted Caryll.

Clarke also edited William Falconer's The Shipwreck, with life of the author and notes (1804), which ran to several editions, and Lord Clarendon's Essays (1815, 2 vols.).
