= Ritter Gluck =

1809 story by E. T. A. Hoffmann

Ritter Gluck is an 1809 short story by E. T. A. Hoffmann. It was the first short story Hoffmann published when it appeared in the 15 February 1809 edition of the Allgemeine musikalische Zeitung. Ritter Gluck was later republished in 1814 in Hoffmann's Fantasy Pieces in Callot's Manner. The story features German composer Christoph Willibald Gluck as a ghostly figure; the story is set in 1809, and Gluck died in 1787.

== Plot summary ==
The story is told in the first person. The narrator meets a peculiar man in Berlin. Whilst the pair sit in the Tiergarten listening to the performance of a waltz, they begin conversing. The strange man reveals that he is a talented composer himself. The two men talk; they are both familiar with the works of Gluck and Mozart but disdain how their works are performed in Berlin. After the mysterious man disappears, the two men lose contact. A few months later, as the opera Armide (composed by Gluck) is being performed, the men meet again. Both are unsatisfied with how the piece is performed, and the mysterious man decides to show the narrator how Armide should be played. He brings the narrator to his house and plays the piece on his old piano. The narrator is given the task of turning over the pages of the virtuoso, but the paper is empty of any notation. The unknown man sings the final scene of the opera. The events unfolding unnerve the narrator, but he admits that the other man has played Armide as he would himself. At the end of the story, Gluck appears and identifies himself to the narrator: "I am Ritter Gluck!" (German: "Ich bin der Ritter Gluck!").

== Reception ==
Christoph Willibald Gluck died in 1787, and the story was published in 1809. This fact led to some disagreement as to whether Hoffmann intended Ritter Gluck to be a fantasy story, or whether "Gluck" was instead a mad stranger who has convinced himself to be the composer. According to Gerhard Schulz, Hoffmann leaves it up to the reader's interpretation.

== Sources ==
- Kremer, Detlev, ed. (2012). E.T.A. Hoffmann. Leben – Werk – Wirkung (in German). De Grutyer. doi:10.1515/9783110240009. ISBN 9783110240009.
- Schulz, Gerhard (1989). Die deutsche Literatur zwischen Französischer Revolution und Restauration. Munich: Beck. ISBN 3-406-09399-X.
