= Naval Chronicle =

British periodical published from 1799 to 1818

The Naval Chronicle was a British periodical published monthly between January, 1799 and December, 1818 (Huntington). It contained information about the Royal Navy of the United Kingdom, including biographies, histories, news, and essays on nautical subjects, as well as poems and ballads on a variety of related topics (Jeffery).

The founders were James Stanier Clarke and John McArthur, and the editorial staff included Stephen Jones and his brother John Jones (father of John Winter Jones). Contributors included Francis Gibson, and Charles Vinicombe Penrose under initials as pseudonyms. Nicholas Pocock provided a long series of illustrations.

== Notes ==
- Huntington Library Catalog
- Jeffery, Walter James. Index to The Naval Chronicle 1798-1818. Publisher: S.N., 1933.
