= Richard Meredith (author) =

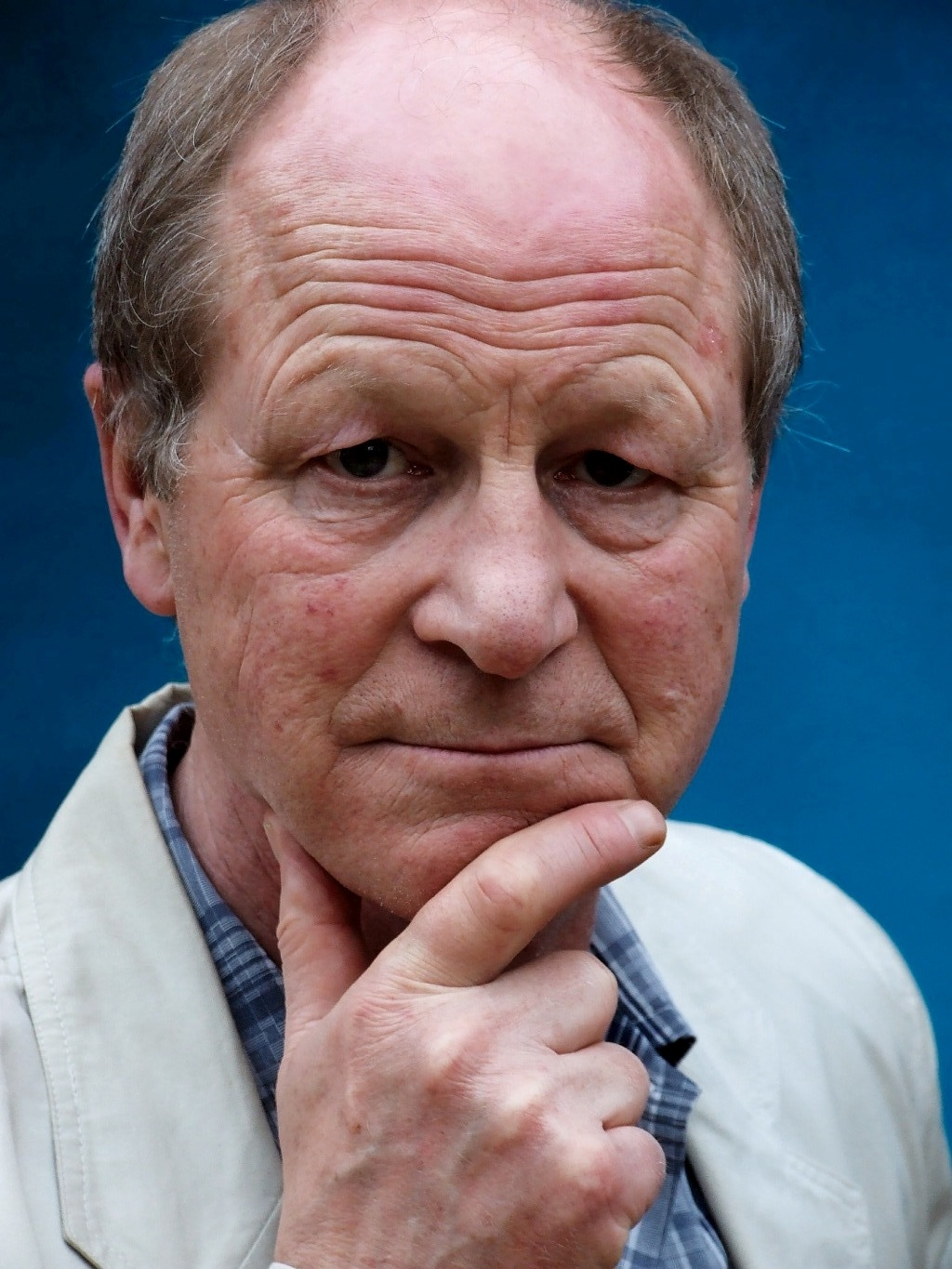
- Richard Meredith
- Born: 7 September 1948 (age 77); London, England
- Occupation: Author
- Writing career
- Genre: Adventure travel
- Notable works: One Way or Another, Which Way Next, Driven Together
- Website: mercurybooks.co.uk

Richard Meredith (Born 7 September 1948) is a British writer of adventure travel novels best known for Driven Together, his account of the 2007 first car crossing of the new Asian Highway.

Meredith and his co-driver Phil Colley drove from Tokyo (the Highway's farthest point East) to Istanbul (farthest West) in a journey facilitated by the United Nations, whose Commission in Bangkok had finally secured a pan-Asia agreement on the new road network in 2005 after nearly 50 years of negotiations.

== Silk Roads Revisited ==
Intended as a major benefit for international trade and towards alleviating poverty among Asia's poorer nations, the system is one of the most important developments in global transportation for centuries and resurrects many of the ancient Silk Road trading routes between Asia and Europe.

Meredith, from Newport Pagnell, Buckinghamshire, recruited Colley, a linguist and travel expert from south London, after being lent a V8 Vantage sports car for the trip by Aston Martin who wanted to put the car through a live durability test and to demonstrate its prowess to China's car-buyers.

From Japan, they followed the Highway's main AH1 and AH5 routes along the system's ‘central corridor’ across China and many of the former Russian states in central Asia and eastern Europe.

Including considerable customs clearance problems, ferry trips and minor crash repairs, the journey of approx. 10,000 miles from Tokyo to Istanbul and then onto London, took 49 days. It was independently logged and monitored throughout and ended with a reception and press conference hosted by Aston Martin's then-CEO Dr Ulrich Bez at the Hilton Hotel in Park Lane. China's President Xi Jinping has committed $1 trillion (£750bn) to what he calls the Belt and Road initiative.

== As an author ==
A former national newspaper journalist and business magazine publisher, Meredith turned to adventure travel writing after selling his Holcot Press business in 2000.

He published his first novel One Way or Another in 2002 after what he called a 'Gap Year for Grown-ups' in which he described falling into a series of adventures and misadventures while armed with a back-packers' round-the-world ticket from British Airways.

His second book Which Way Next came after he drove a Daewoo family hatchback saloon from Luton to South Korea with a young student companion in a hair-raising journey that included running the gauntlet across war-ravaged Afghanistan and the Khyber Pass.

A member of the Society of Authors and a card-carrying journalist, Meredith has also published an anthology of his experiences as a writer titled Views From the Front Line and a number of local history publications under a pen name including Cromwell's Garrison Town. and a series of articles titled Bond in Bucks. A non-profit imprint to encourage local authors was launched in 2016.

== Philanthropy ==
By linking his various activities to fund-raising for charity and major events, he has helped to generate more than £535,000 in recent years for causes including the Great Ormond Street Children's Hospital in the UK, the SOS Children's Villages organisation in Nepal which he re-visited on the 10th anniversary in 2013, and UNICEF programmes to reduce the number of deaths of young people on the roads of China.

== Biography ==
Meredith was born in Barnet, Hertfordshire (now north London) to a family whose name of Reynolds on his maternal side can trace their ancestry to before the English Civil War. His great uncle was Air Marshal Sir Brian Reynolds (1902–1965), the former CinC of Coastal Command, while Lt Thomas E.S. Reynolds, another uncle, won the Military Cross at Ypres in 1918. The painter Sir Joshua Reynolds (1723–1792) was believed to be a distant relative.

He was educated at Great Ballard School near Chichester and Allhallows (now closed) outside Lyme Regis which he left before his 16th birthday. In 1988 he took a short degree course in Business Growth Management at Cranfield School of Management.

As a journalist, he trained with the Herts Advertiser in St Albans and reached the Daily Express in Fleet Street via Thomson newspapers and the Press Association. At Thomson's Evening Echo at Hemel Hempstead his newsroom colleagues included John Clare and John Coldstream (later with the Daily Telegraph), Tony Holden, the Royal biographer and Stephen Pile, the TV critic and author; while at the Express, his era included the brief editorship of former ITN newscaster Sir Alastair Burnet, Chapman Pincher, the Defence Correspondent, and Jean Rook, Women's Editor.

His time there added to the family's long association with Express and Standard newspapers. His grandfather Harry was a printer with the Evening Standard, his mother was billeted in World War II with the family of Reg Wootton, the Express's Sporting Sam cartoonist, and his cousin Frances worked in the commercial department.

In 1975, in partnership with friends from the Express and elsewhere, he launched the Northants Post weekly newspaper in Northampton (closed Dec. 2016) and later sold his shares to start the Holcot Press Group, a publisher of business magazines and directories which grew into a national organisation from a base in Milton Keynes. It was sold in 2000 to the Zoa Corporation.

A keen sportsman, Meredith is a former playing member of the Saracens and Northampton rugby clubs and once played tennis at Junior Wimbledon. His daughter Clare is a barrister and son Robert was a finalist in BBC2's Design for Life competition with Philippe Starck in 2009.

In recent years he has taught English-related subjects at secondary school level and as a visiting university lecturer. Richard currently lives in Newport Pagnell.

Richard is divorced with a son and daughter and – when he is not travelling abroad – lives in an Edwardian, former farmworker’s cottage in Buckinghamshire with a pub at the end of the lane.
