= Great Ballard School =

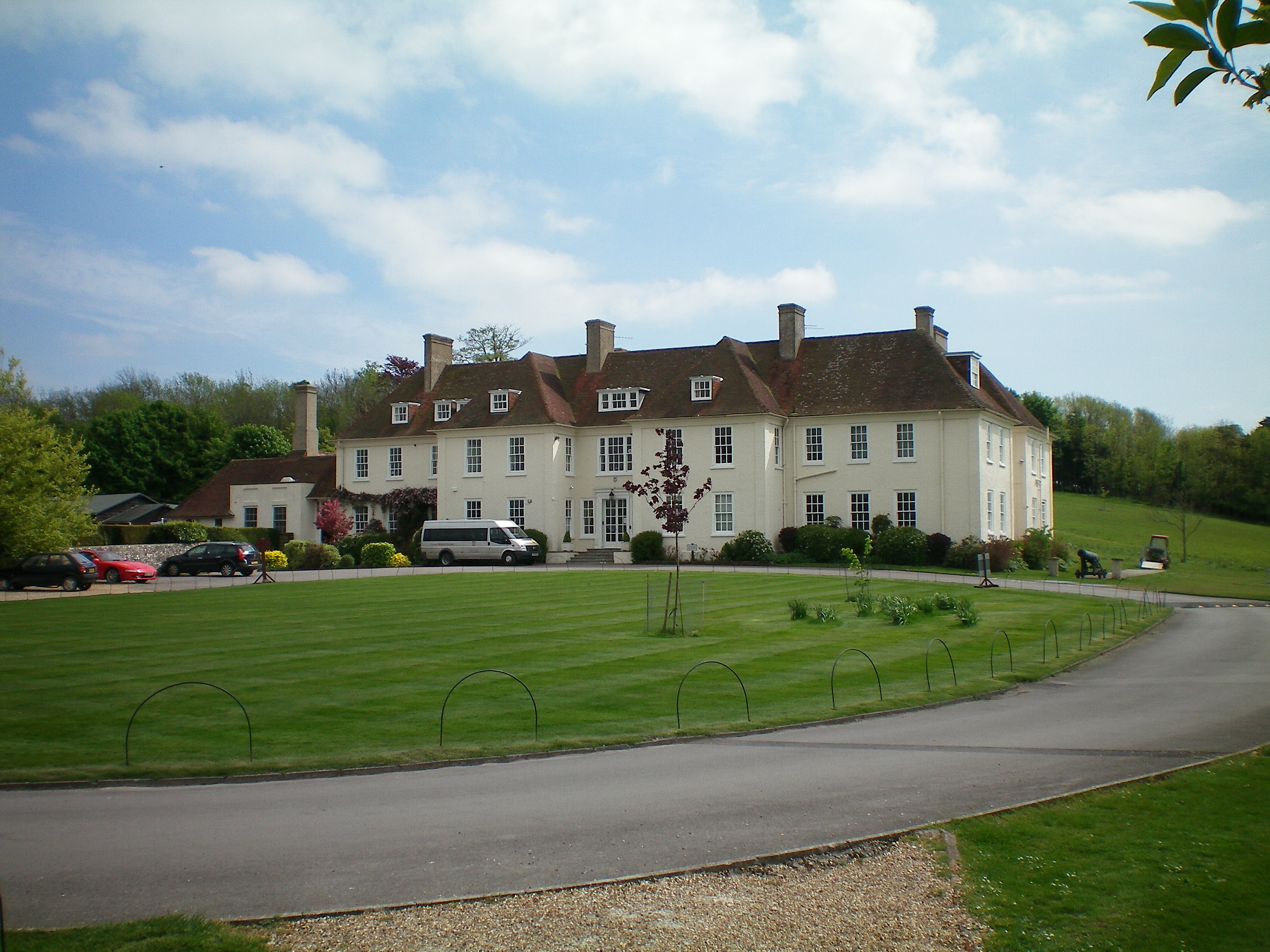

Location
- Eartham; Chichester, West Sussex, PO18 0LR; England; 50°52′31″N 0°40′00″W

Information
- Type: Independent school
- Motto: Vincit qui se vincit
- Established: 1924
- Local authority: West Sussex
- Department for Education URN: 126130 Tables
- Acting Head: Matthew King
- Gender: Coeducational
- Age: 2½ to 16
- Enrolment: 140 (in 2016)
- Website: http://greatballard.co.uk

Listed Building – Grade II
- Official name: Eartham House
- Designated: 5 June 1958
- Reference no.: 1026365

Great Ballard School is a co-educational independent school for children aged 2½ to 16 years. It was founded in 1924 and set up at its current location in Eartham, near Chichester, West Sussex, England, in 1961. The headmaster is Matthew King.

== Eartham House ==
The school's main building, Eartham House, was originally built in 1800 and was occupied by the poet William Hayley. The house was subsequently purchased by William Huskisson, a prominent nineteenth-century politician who was a member of parliament for Chichester and served in the governments of Lord Liverpool and the Duke of Wellington. Huskisson, despite his high-profile political career, is best remembered for the tragic manner of his death – he was run over by George Stephenson's locomotive engine The Rocket at the opening of the Liverpool to Manchester railway line in 1830.

Eartham House was entirely rebuilt in 1905 to designs by the architect Edwin Lutyens, but some Regency decorations and fireplaces are still retained in one room. The house was listed as a Grade II listed building by the Ministry of Works in 1958.

== School history ==
Since its founding, the school has had many homes, including the original site at New Milton Hampshire. It remained there until the Second World War, when it was relocated to Dorset and then to Stowell Park in Gloucestershire, where it stayed until 1947. For a short time it was then at Cordwalles, Camberley, Surrey, where the Queen had carried out her ATS training, until a fire forced a temporary return to Stowell Park. After repairs, the school remained in Camberley until moving to its current location in 1961, chosen because the area around its home at Camberley had become more urbanised.

== Notable alumni ==
- Julien Fountain, cricketer and baseball player
- Richard Meredith, author
- Honeysuckle Weeks, actress
