= Eliza Hayley =

English translator and essayist

- Born: Chichester
- Died: London
- Occupations: Translator, essayist
- Known for: Married to William Hayley
- Notable work: Essays on Friendship and Old Age by the Marchioness de Lambert; The Triumph of Acquaintance over Friendship: an Essay for the Times

Eliza Ball Hayley (18 June 1750 – 8 November 1797) was an English translator and essayist, best known for having translated into English two essays by the French salonnière and intellectual Anna Thèrese de Lambert: Traité de l’Amitié (1732) and Traité de la Vieillesse (1732), published in 1780 as Essays on Friendship and Old Age by the Marchioness de Lambert. Sixteen years later she published an original work, The Triumph of Acquaintance over Friendship: an Essay for the Times (1796). Some of the letters from Ball Hayley's that have survived, stored at The Fitzwilliam Museum, Cambridge University, will be a part of the pilot digital edition of the correspondence of William Hayley: "A Museum of Relationships", a work in progress co-led by Dr Lisa Gee.

== Biography ==
Eliza Ball was the daughter of Thomas Ball (1698-1770), dean of Chichester, and Margaret Mill (1712-1783).

In 1768 she was married to William Hayley, her father's godson, whom she knew from infancy, and settled at Eartham, the Hayleys ancestral home, in June 1774

The couple separated in 1789, and Ball Hayley moved to Derby. Ball Hayley's mental health, quoted by Thomas as a reason for their estrangement, was a subject of interest for her contemporaries and her husband’s biographers, and it remains a matter of speculation. Between 1794 and until her death, the author often visited London, residing near Hyde Park.

If Seward’s letters to Ball Hayley are any indicator of the former’s social life, Ball Hayley was very active during those years. She was in her residence in London, when she died the 8th of November 1797 of an "epidemic fever"

She was buried in Eartham on the 17th of November 1797. Her husband William wrote an epitaph intended for her funeral monument:

“If lovely features and a lofty mind
Tender as charity as bounty kind
If these were blessings that to life could give
A lot which makes it happiness to live
Thou Eliza hadst been blest on earth
But Seraphs in compassion wept thy birth
For thy deep nervous woes of wondrous weight
Love could not heal nor sympathy relate
Yet pity trusts with hallowed truth serene
Thy God repays them in a purer scene
Peace to thy ashes to thy memory love
And to thy spirit in the realms above
All that from blameless sufferings below
Mortality can hope or angels know”

Her obituary, published in the Gentleman's Magazine, described her as “Mrs Hayley, wife of Wm. H. esq. of Eartham, Sussex, the celebrated poet, and daughter of the late Rev. Thomas Ball, dean of Chichester.”, making no references to her publications.

== Works ==
- Essays on Friendship and Old Age by the Marchioness de Lambert (1780).
- The Triumph of Acquaintance over Friendship: an Essay for the Times (1796).

== Literary circle ==
During the first half of 1781 Eliza resided in Bath, where she met, amongst others, William Melmoth Jr, to whom she had dedicated her Essays on Friendship and Old Age by the Marchioness de Lambert the year before. Between January and February, she attended Anna, Lady Miller’s Bath-Easton assembly. She was friends with the poet and literary critic Anna Seward.
