= Fantasy Pieces in Callot's Manner =

1814–1815 short story collection by E. T. A. Hoffmann

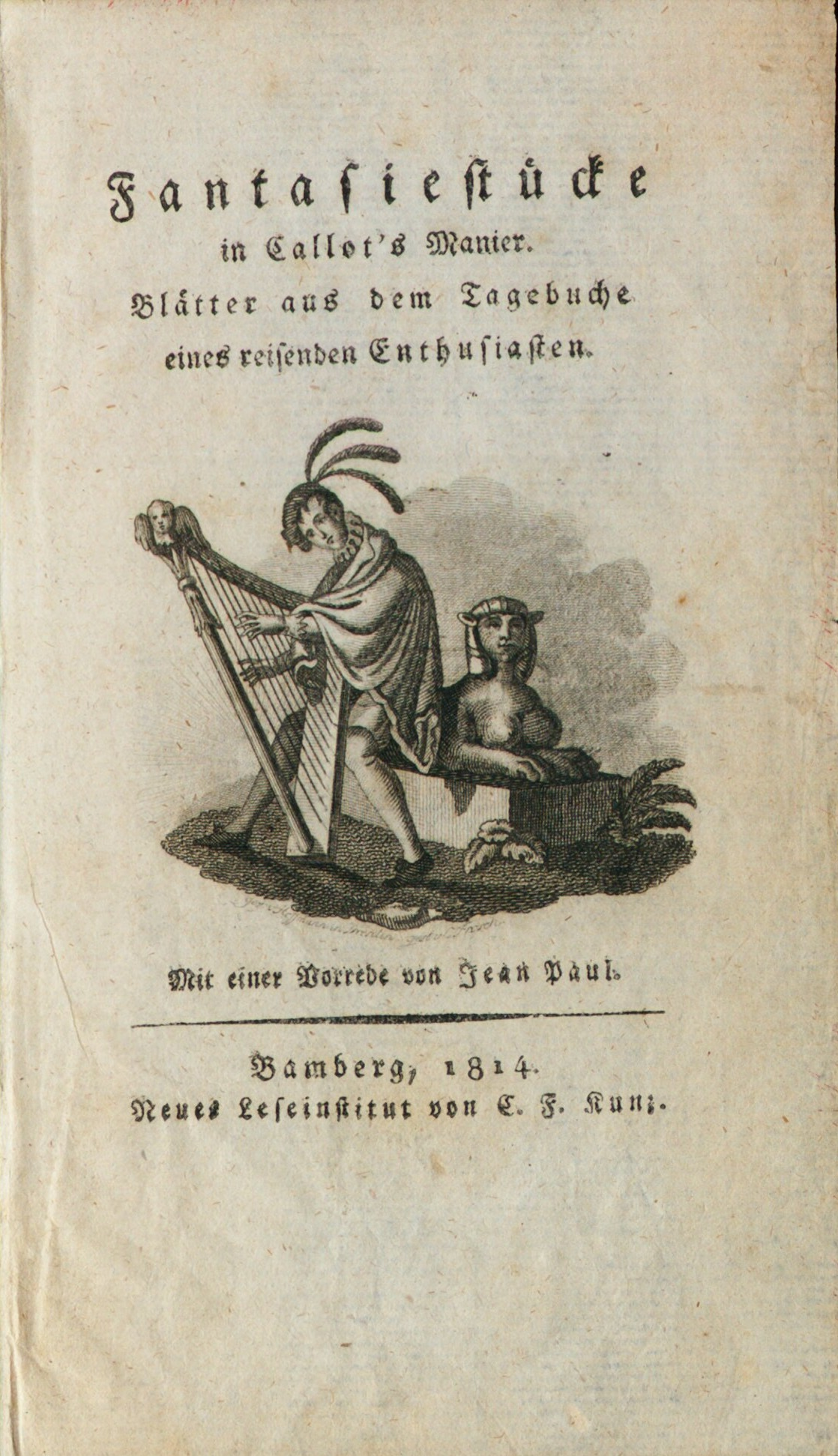
- Title page of the first volume, 1814
- Author: E. T. A. Hoffmann
- Original title: Fantasiestücke in Callots Manier
- Language: German
- Publisher: Carl Friedrich Kunz
- Publication date: 1814–1815
- Publication place: Bavaria
- Pages: 1262 (1814–1815); 633 (1819)

Fantasy Pieces in Callot's Manner: Pages from the Diary of a Travelling Romantic (German: Fantasiestücke in Callots Manier. Blätter aus dem Tagebuche eines reisenden Enthusiasten) is the first prose collection by the Prussian writer E. T. A. Hoffmann, consisting of fantastical short stories, novellas and music criticism. It was published in four volumes in 1814–1815 and in a revised two-volume version in 1819.

== Contents ==
1819 version:

First volume

- Preface by Jean Paul (Vorrede von Jean Paul)
1. "Jaques Callot"
2. "Ritter Gluck" (Ritter Gluck. Eine Erinnerung aus dem Jahre 1809)
3. "Kreisleriana: Nos. 1–6" (Kreisleriana (Erster Theil). Nro. 1 – 6)
  1. "The Kapellmeister's Musical Sorrows (Johannes Kreisler's, des Kapellmeisters, musikalische Leiden)
  2. "Ombra Adorata!"
  3. "Thoughts on the Great Value of Music" (Gedanken über den hohen Werth der Musik)
  4. "Beethoven's Instrumental Music" (Beethovens Instrumental-Musik)
  5. "Extremely Random Thoughts" (Höchst zerstreute Gedanken)
  6. "The Compleat Stage Manager" (Der vollkommene Maschinist)
4. "Don Juan" (Don Juan. Eine fabelhafte Begebenheit, die sich mit einem reisenden Enthusiasten zugetragen)
5. "A Report on the Latest Adventures of the Dog Berganza" (Nachricht von den neuesten Schicksalen des Hundes Berganza)

Second volume

1. "The Mesmerist" (Der Magnetiseur. Eine Familienbegebenheit)
2. "The Golden Pot: A Modern Fairy Tale" (Der goldne Topf. Ein Mährchen aus der neuen Zeit. [In zwölf Vigilien])
3. "The New Year's Eve Adventure" (Die Abentheuer der Sylvester-Nacht))
4. "Kreisleriana: [Second Section]" (Kreisleriana (Zweiter Theil))
  1. "Baron Wallborn to Kapellmeister Kreisler" (Brief des Barons Wallborn an den Kapellmeister Kreisler) (by Friedrich de la Motte Fouqué)
  2. "Kapellmeister Kreisler to Baron Wallborn" (Brief des Kapellmeisters Kreisler an den Baron Wallborn)
  3. "Kreisler's Musical-Poetic Club" (Kreislers musikalisch-poetischer Klubb)
  4. "Report from an Educated Young Man" (Nachricht von einem gebildeten jungen Mann)
  5. "The Music Hater" (Der Musikfeind)
  6. "On a Remark by Sacchini and On the Effect of Music" (Ueber einen Ausspruch Sacchini’s, und über den sogenannten Effekt in der Musik)
  7. "Johannes Kreisler's Apprentice Letter" (Johannes Kreislers Lehrbrief)

The original version incorporated the beginning of the novella Princess Brambilla in "Kreisler's Musical-Poetic Club". The 1819 version omitted this story.

== Publication ==
Much of the material had been published previously in periodicals. The collection was published in four volumes by Carl Friedrich Kunz in Bamberg in 1814 and 1815, and in a revised two-volume version in 1819. The initiative to include the name of the 17th-century printmaker Jacques Callot in the title came from Kunze. Hoffmann knew little about Callot and his work at the time, but at Kunze's suggestion he looked through a collection of Callot's prints, enjoyed them and wrote an essay about Callot that opens the book. Kunze was also the one who got Jean Paul to write a preface.

== Legacy ==
The book established the model for stories that Hoffmann would follow and develop further in his collections Night Pieces (1816–1817) and The Serapion Brethren (1819–1821).
