= Don Juan (short story) =

1813 story by E. T. A. Hoffmann

Don Juan is an 1812 short story by E. T. A. Hoffmann, which was first published on 31 March 1813 in the Allgemeine musikalische Zeitung and later republished in Hoffmann's 1814 collection Fantasiestücke in Callots Manier.

The story is told in the first person by a traveller who describes his experience watching Mozart's opera Don Giovanni in a theatre adjacent to his hotel.

== Plot summary ==
A waiter draws the traveller's attention to a door in his hotel room, which leads directly into room 23, the Fremdenloge (literal translation: "stranger box") of a theatre which attaches to the hotel. In the theatre, Mozart's Don Giovanni is being performed. The traveller sits in his box and enjoys the opera, with which he is very familiar. Whilst he sits there engrossed in the performance and his own thoughts, he feels that someone has come into his box. He decides not to turn around, as he does not want to be distracted from the poetic-musical exaltation he is experiencing. During the interlude, the traveller turns around and sees that the stranger is Donna Anna, a character from Don Giovanni. The traveller and Donna Anna talk in Tuscan about the opera; she offers insight which makes the narrator see the opera in a new light. The woman uses the "du" form and calls the traveller by his name.

Donna Anna disappears and the opera resumes. The narrator is satisfied with the rest of the performance. Afterwards, he goes to dine in the hotel restaurant and overhears other audience members discussing the performance; they do not rate it highly, and focus on the appearances of the actors. The narrator retreats to his room. He re-enters the box of the theatre and calls down to the empty stage: "Donna Anna!". Anna then appears to the narrator a second time. At two o'clock, the narrator thinks he hears Donna Anna's voice talking to him.

The following noon, at the hotel restaurant, the narrator learns from other hotel guests that the singer who played Donna Anna had died earlier that morning, at two o'clock.

== Analysis ==
Don Juan has spawned many different interpretations, although most critics accept that the story plays out on two "diametrically opposed planes"; that of the opera and that of the real world outside. These two worlds cross over when Donna Anna appears to the narrator in his box, and the narrator finds himself implicated in the drama himself.

The tale has strong Romantic themes — the narrator, himself an artist, finds no comfort in the world of philistines in which he finds himself (as represented by the other hotel guests), and the experience of finding a soul mate in Donna Anna is "almost overwhelming". Donna Anna is, to Birgit Röder, "an example of the extreme Romantic individual who can find fulfilment only in death".

== Sources ==
- Röder, Birgit (2003). "7: Don Juan". A Study of the Major Novellas of E.T.A Hoffmann. Boydell and Brewer. ISBN 9781571136305.
