= John Andrew (rugby union, born 1870) =

South African rugby union player (b. 1870, d. 1911)

John Ben Andrew
- Born: John Benjamin Andrew; 15 May 1870 Hey, Lancashire, England
- Died: 9 April 1911 (aged 40)
- School: De La Salle College

Rugby union career
- Position: Forward
Provincial / State sides
Years	Team	Apps	(Points)
1896	Transvaal	0	(0)
International career
Years	Team	Apps	(Points)
1896	South Africa	1	(0)
- Correct as of 27 May 2019

John Ben Andrew (15 May 1870 – 9 April 1911) was a South African international rugby union player who played as a forward.

He made 1 appearance for South Africa against the British Lions in 1896.
