= The Life of Lord Nelson =

1809 biography

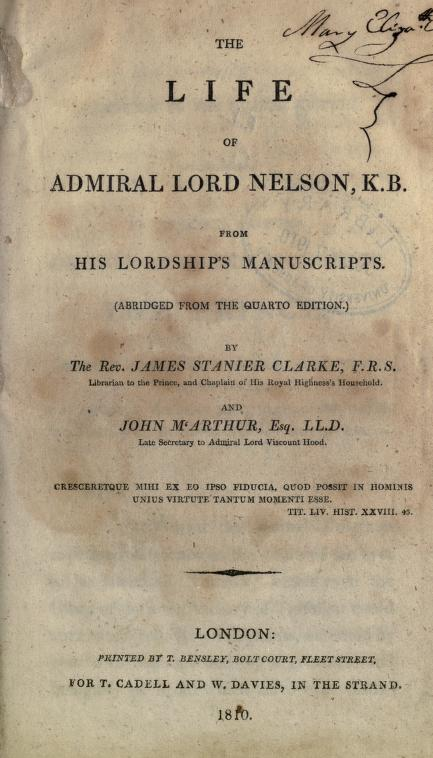
- Author: James Stanier Clarke; John McArthur
- Language: English
- Publisher: Cadell and Davies
- Publication date: 1809
- Publication place: United Kingdom
- Media type: Print

The Life of Nelson is an 1809 two-volume biography written by James Stanier Clarke and John McArthur. Published in London by Cadell and Davies, it charts the life of the British Admiral Horatio Nelson, 1st Viscount Nelson from birth to his death during his greatest victory at the Battle of Trafalgar in 1805. Nelson had become a national hero Trafalgar, ending the threat of an invasion by France, been given a state burial at St. Paul's Cathedral.

At a time when Britain was still fighting the Napoleonic Wars, the authors looked to promote Nelson's role as a patriotic hero to inspire the British public. It glossed over Nelson's private life, which included a long-standing affair with Lady Hamilton.

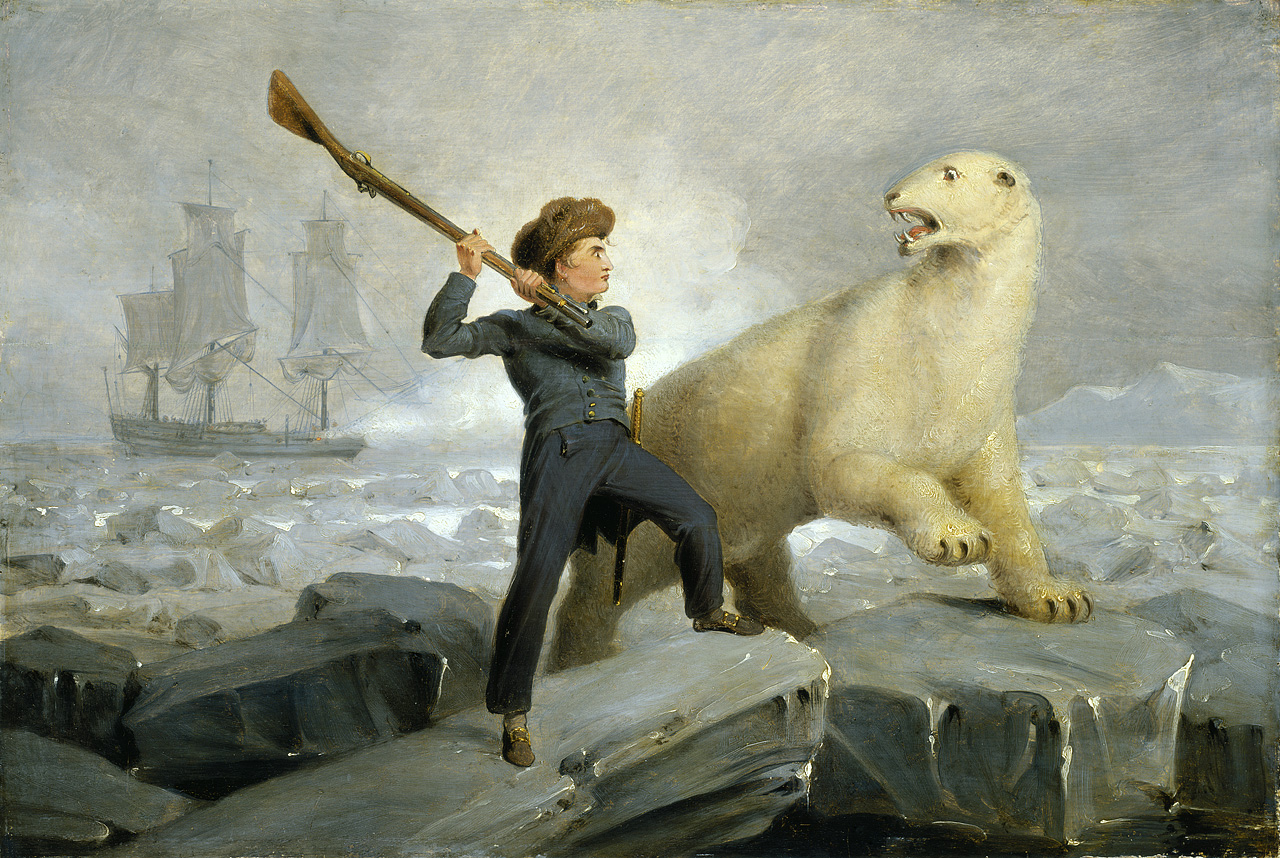
Nelson and the Bear by Richard Westall, 1809. Commissioned to illustrate the book.

To illustrate the book with scenes from Nelson's life McArthur commissioned paintings from the artist Richard Westall including Nelson and the Bear. These were turned into engravings by John Landseer. The images were romantic in nature.

== Bibliography ==
- Cannadine, David (ed.) Admiral Lord Nelson: Context and Legacy. Springer, 2005.
- Phillips, Mark Salber. Society and Sentiment: Genres of Historical Writing in Britain, 1740-1820. Princeton University Press, 2000.
- Range, Matthias. British Royal and State Funerals: Music and Ceremonial Since Elizabeth I. Boydell & Brewer, 2016.
