= E.T.A. Hoffmann. Leben – Werk – Wirkung =

2009 book edited by Detlef Kremer

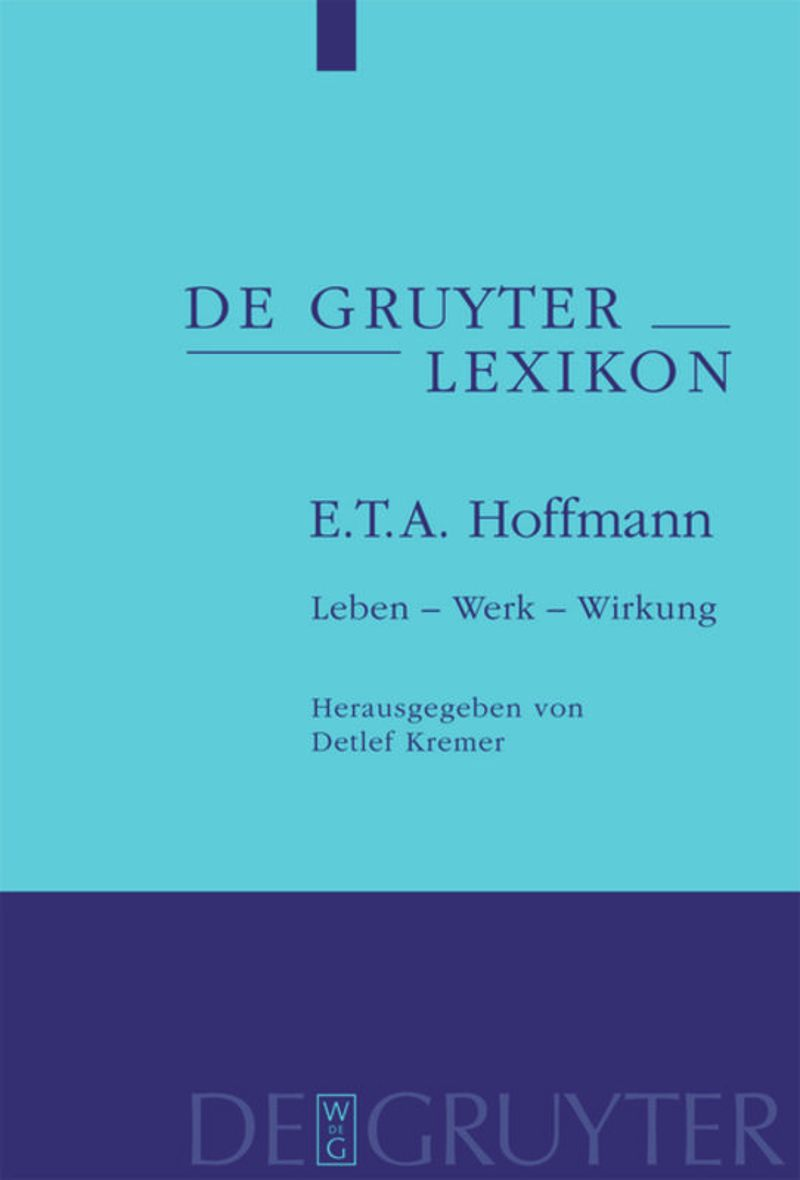
- Cover of the first edition
- Author: Detlef Kremer
- Language: German
- Series: De Gruyter Lexikon
- Subject: E. T. A. Hoffmann
- Genre: reference work
- Publisher: de Gruyter
- Publication date: 5 May 2009
- Publication place: Germany
- Pages: 666
- ISBN: 978-3-11-018382-5

E.T.A. Hoffmann. Leben – Werk – Wirkung (lit. 'Life – Work – Impact') is a German reference book about the Prussian jurist, writer, composer and artist E. T. A. Hoffmann, edited by Detlef Kremer and published by de Gruyter in 2009 as part of its De Gruyter Lexikon series. A second, expanded edition was published in 2010.

Monika Schmitz-Emans wrote in Zeitschrift für Germanistik that the book opens new perspectives on Hoffmann by bringing together the breadth of current Hoffmann research and making it comprehensible in its proper context.
