= John Andrews (footballer, born 1950) =

English footballer (born 1950)

Personal information
- Full name: John Edward Andrews
- Date of birth: 3 February 1950 (age 76)
- Place of birth: York, England
- Position: Goalkeeper

Youth career
- Moor Lane YC

Senior career*
Years	Team	Apps	(Gls)
1968–1969	York City	11	(0)
- * Club domestic league appearances and goals

John Edward Andrews (born 3 February 1950) is an English former footballer who played as a goalkeeper. He played for York City in the English Football League and he later worked as a referee.

== Career ==
Andrews was born in York and played for Moor Lane Youth Club before joining hometown club York City in August 1968 as an amateur. Following an injury to goalkeeper Bob Widdowson, Andrews made his first team debut in a Fourth Division match against Rochdale on 5 April 1969, which was lost 2–1. He featured in all of York's remaining games of the 1968–69 season, making 11 appearances. He was not retained by the club after the end of the season. As of 1997 he was working as a referee in the York Football League.
