= John Andrews (poet) =

English poet

John Andrews (17th century), was an English poet.

Andrews was the author of a poem called the "Anatomie of Basenesse" (1615), which was reprinted in the "Miscellanies of the Fuller Worthies' Library" (vol. ii.). The "Anatomie" was published with only the initials I. A. in the epistle dedicatory to Sir Robert Sydney, but this epistle guides to the authorship. Apologising for his dedication, the writer says, among other things, that he prints not "vaine-gloriously", or he would have "subscribed his name", and that he forbore to have his name published "out of some respects". The "some respects" probably refer to his being a minister of the Gospel; he seems to have held that his satire was too drastic and vehement for a clergyman, and might lay him open to misconstruction. Anthony à Wood in his "Athenæ", and his editor Dr. Bliss, filled in the initials thus—"I[ohn] A[ndrews]"—and wrote of him:

"John Andrews, a Somersetshire man born, was entered a student in Trinity College 1601, aged 18, took one degree in arts [viz. M.A., Fasti Oxon.], left the university, became a painfull preacher of God's word, and a publisher of [certain books] ... When he died, or where he was buried, I know not".

According to Dr. Bliss he "seems to have been the same person with John Andrews, minister and preacher of the word of God at Berwick Bassett, in the county of Wilts, who was the author of "Christ's Cross; or the most comfortable Doctrine of Christ crucified, and joyful Tidings of his Passion". Oxon. 1614, qu. in two parts. To this writer we may ascribe a very rare poetical work entitled the "Anatomie of Basenesse". Sir Richard Hoare, the historian of Wiltshire, makes no mention of Andrews. It would therefore appear that he was curate or assistant or lecturer rather than incumbent.

All the religious books of John Andrews have interspersed verses of the same stamp as those to be found in the "Anatomie of Basenesse". They include:

- "Andrewes' Golden Chaine to linke the penitent sinner unto Almighty God" (1645).
- "Brazen Serpent … at Paules Crosse" (1621).
- "Converted Man's New Birth" (1629).
- "Andrewes' Repentance, sounding alarum to returne from his sinne unto Almighty God, declaring his repentance. Published by John Andrewes, minister of the Word of God in the county of Wilts" (1623).
- "A Golden Trumpet sounding an Alarum to Judgement", by "John Andrewes, minister and preacher of God's Word", of which the twenty-ninth impression appeared in 1648.
- "A Celestiall Looking-Glasse" by "John Andrewes, preacher of God's Word" (1639).
- "Andrewes' Caveat to win Sinners … newly published by John Andrewes, preacher of God's Word" (1655).

Of the "Anatomie of Basenesse" only the solitary exemplar in the Bodleian is known. It is a vivid poem, and its terse aphoristic sayings linger in the memory. The "Feast of the Envious" will still bear quotation. It contains these lines:—

Nor can the hand of reconciling Death
Free men from this injurious monster's sting,
Which through the bowels of the Earth doth pierce,
And in the quiet vault appeares more fierce
Than Death—the grave's sterne tyrannising king.
