= William Hayley =

English biographer (1745–1820)

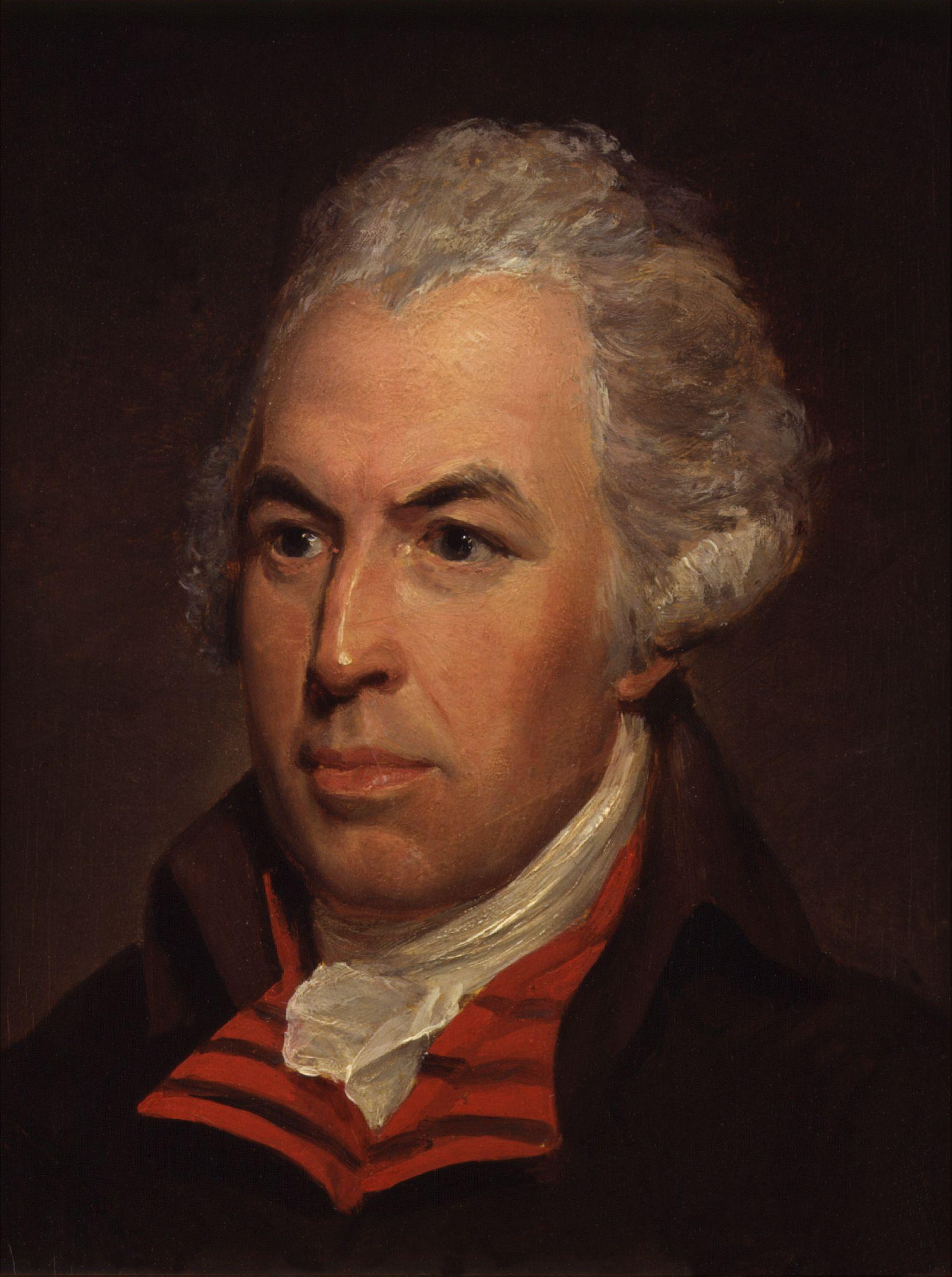
William Hayley by Henry Howard

William Hayley (9 November 1745 – 12 November 1820) was an English writer, best known as the biographer of his friend William Cowper.

== Biography ==
Plaque at site of Hayley's home in Felpham, Sussex

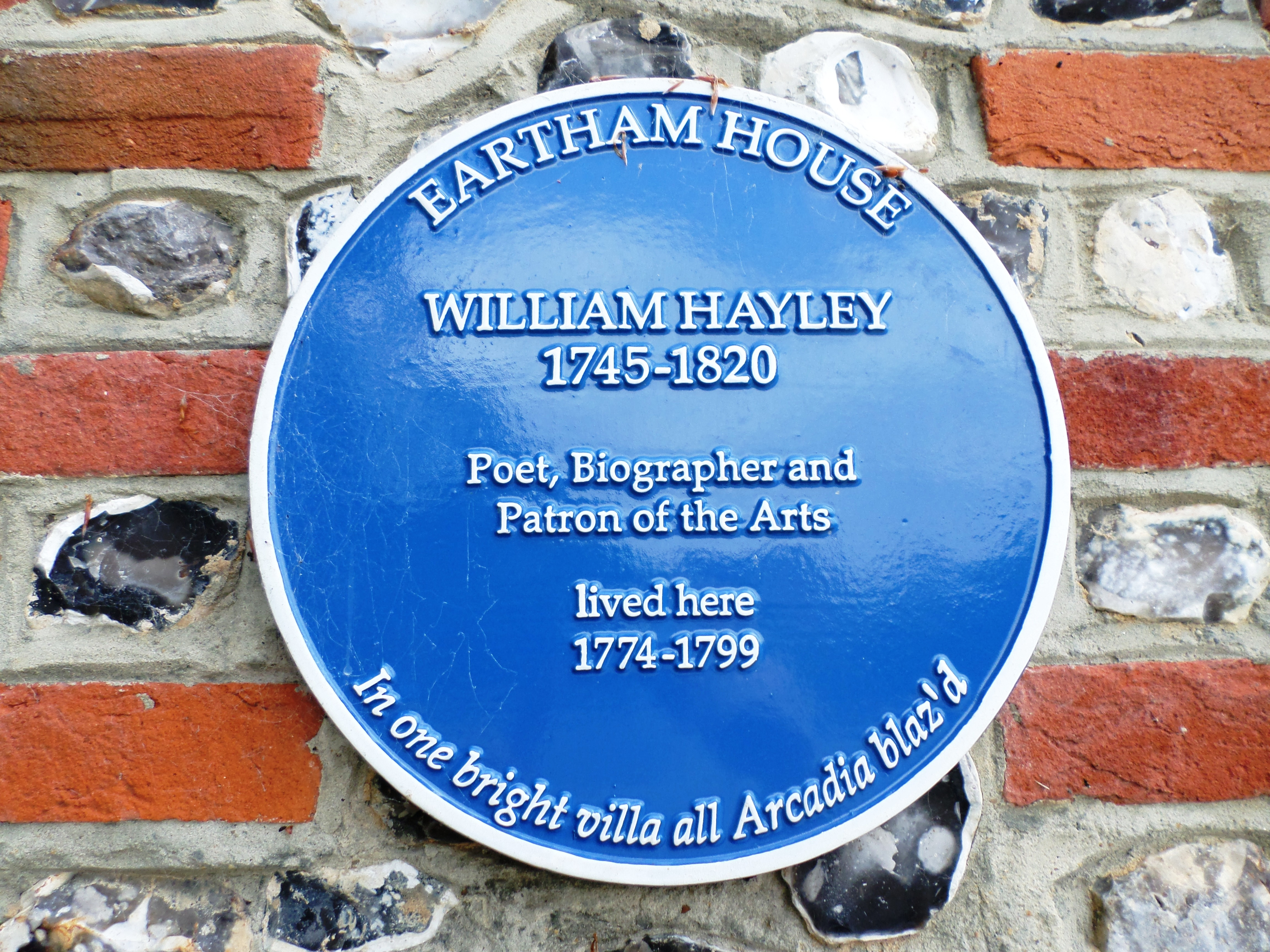
Plaque at site of Hayley's home in Eartham, Sussex

Born at Chichester, he was sent to Eton in 1757, and to Trinity Hall, Cambridge, in 1762; his connection with the Middle Temple, London, where he was admitted in 1766, was merely nominal. In 1767 he left Cambridge and went to live in London. His private means enabled Hayley to live on his patrimonial estate at Eartham, Sussex, and he retired there in 1774. The location of this house in Eartham is now occupied by the Great Ballard School.

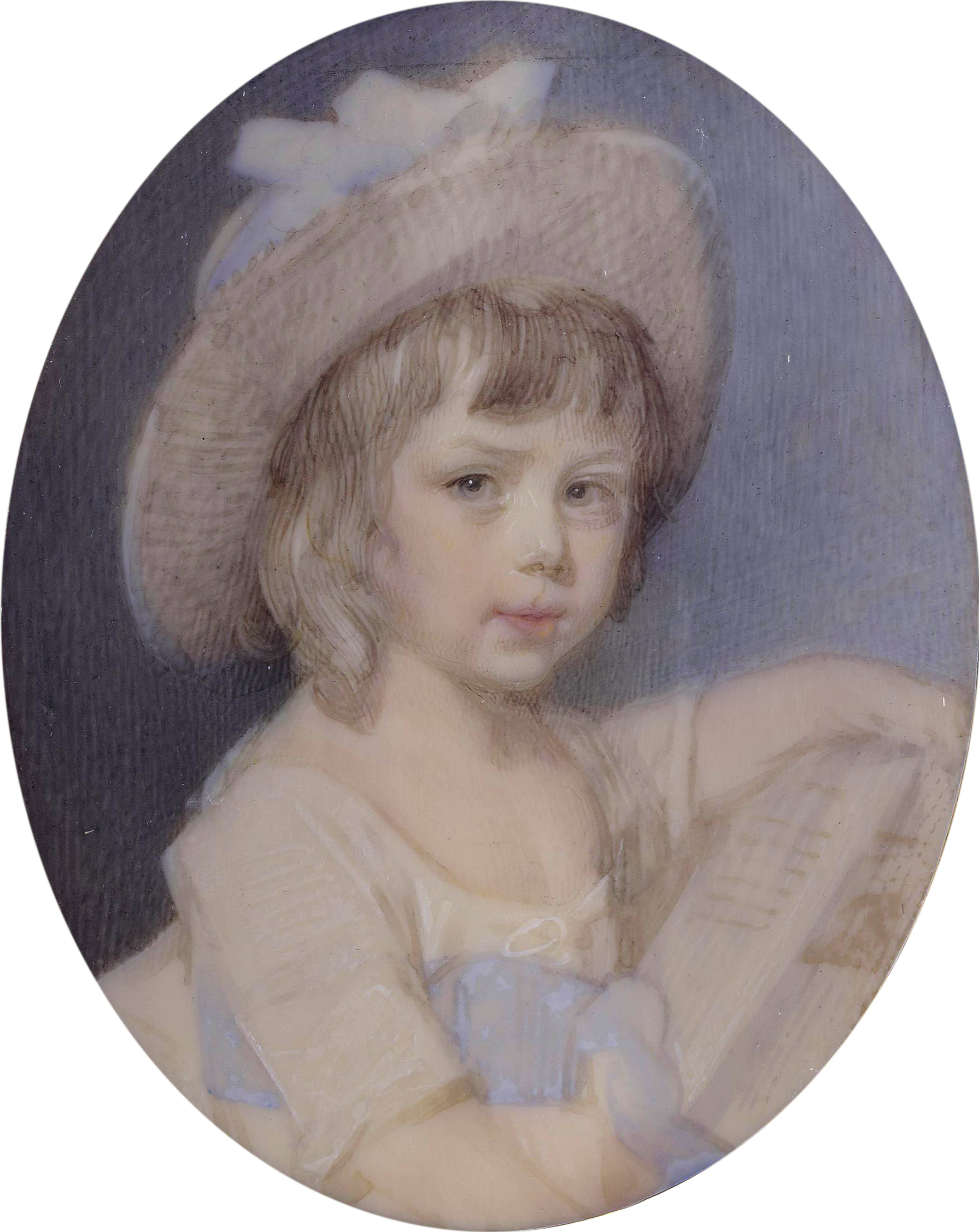
Hayley's son, Thomas Alphonso. (Jeremiah Meyer)

So great was Hayley's fame that on Thomas Warton's death in 1790 he was offered the laureateship, which he refused. In 1792, while writing the Life of Milton, Hayley made Cowper's acquaintance. A warm friendship sprang up between the two which lasted till Cowper's death in 1800. Hayley indeed was mainly instrumental in getting Cowper his pension. In 1800 Hayley also lost his natural son, Thomas Alphonso Hayley, to whom he was devotedly attached. He had been a pupil of John Flaxman's, to whom Hayley's Essay on Sculpture (1800) is addressed. Flaxman introduced William Blake to Hayley, and after the latter had moved in 1800 to his marine hermitage at Felpham, Sussex. Blake settled near him for three years to engrave the illustrations for the Life of Cowper. This, Hayley's best known work, was published in 1803–1804 (Chichester) in 5 vols.

Hayley died at Felpham on 12 November 1820. His library was sold at auction by Evans, in London, on 13 February (and twelve following days), in 2649 lots. A copy of the catalogue is at Cambridge University Library (Munby.c.123(4)).

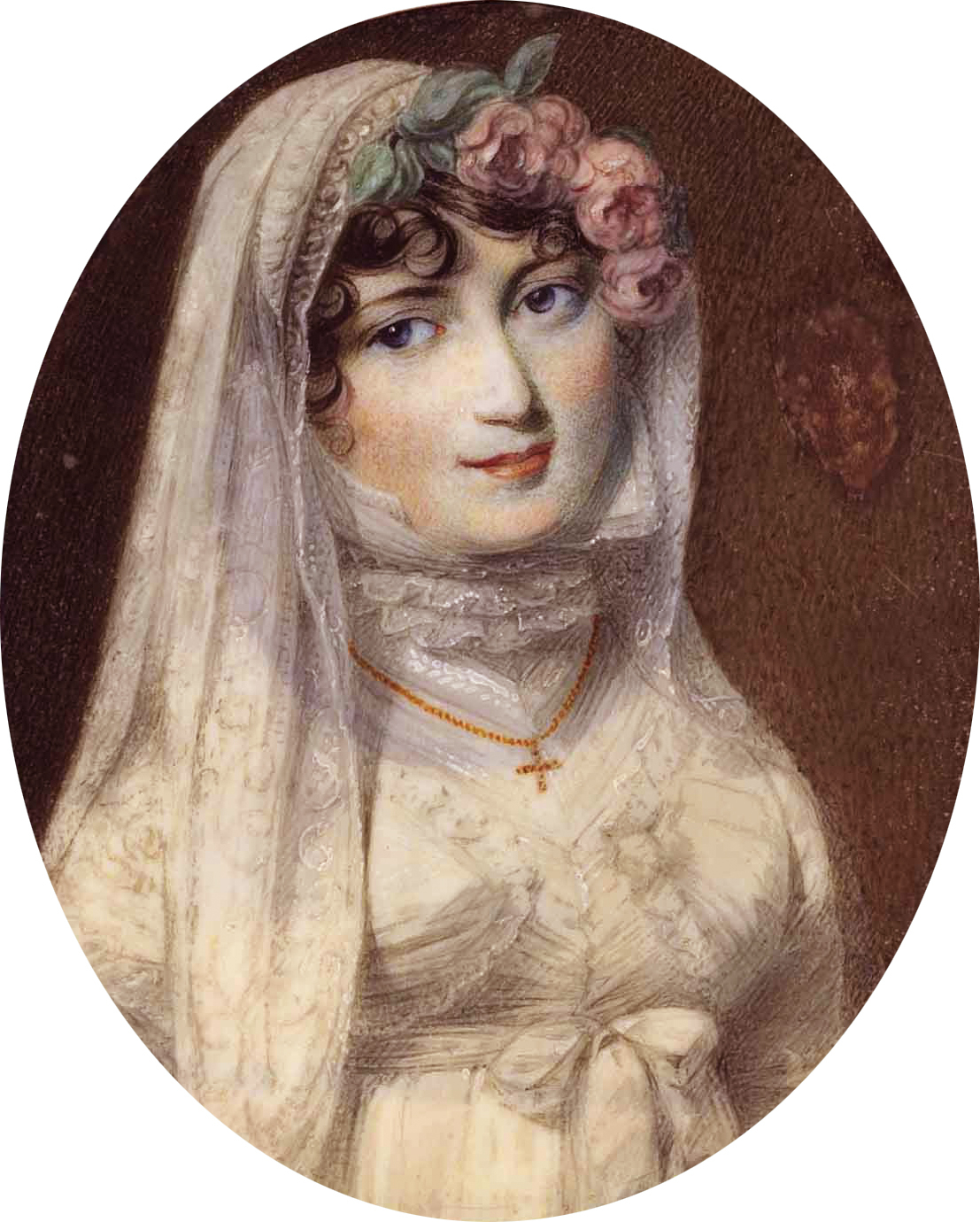
Mary Welford (after George Engleheart, circa 1790)

== Works ==
Hayley had already written occasional poems, when in 1771 his tragedy, The Afflicted Father, was rejected by David Garrick. In the same year his translation of Pierre Corneille's Rodogune as The Syrian Queen was also declined by George Colman. Hayley won the fame he enjoyed amongst his contemporaries by his poetical Essays and Epistles; a Poetical Epistle to an Eminent Painter (1778), addressed to his friend George Romney, an Essay on History (1780), in three epistles, addressed to Edward Gibbon; Essay on Epic Poetry (1782) addressed to William Mason; A Philosophical Essay on Old Maids (1785); and the Triumphs of Temper (1781). The last-mentioned work was so popular as to run to twelve or fourteen editions; together with the Triumphs of Music (Chichester, 1804) it was ridiculed by Byron in English Bards and Scotch Reviewers. His 1789 tragedy Marcella was performed at Drury Lane.

In 1805 he published Ballads founded on Anecdotes of Animals (Chichester), with illustrations by Blake, and in 1809 The Life of Romney. For the last twelve years of his life Hayley received an allowance for writing his Memoirs.

== Legacy ==
In 2007, the exhibition "Poets in the Landscape: the Romantic Spirit in British Art" curated by Simon Martin and held at Pallant House Gallery in Chichester explored Hayley's role as patron and friend of artists including William Blake, George Romney, John Flaxman and Joseph Wright of Derby. It was appropriate that the gallery's new wing is situated on 8 North Pallant, which formed part of the house in which Hayley was born. A portrait of Hayley by George Romney is currently on long-term display in the gallery.

== Family ==
In 1769 Hayley married Eliza Ball (1750-1797), daughter of Thomas Ball, dean of Chichester. Eliza Ball Hayley was a translator and an essayist. She translated into English two essays by the French essayist Anna Thèrese de Lambert (1647 – 1733), Traité de l’Amitié (1732) and Traité de la Vieillesse (1732), published in 1780 as Essays on Friendship and Old Age by the Marchioness de Lambert. Sixteen years later she published an original essay, The Triumph of Acquaintance over Friendship: an Essay for the Times (1796). She died in 1797; after being separated from William since 1789. He attributed the mental illness she suffered as reasoning for the separation. He married in 1809 Mary Welford, but they also separated after three years. He left no child.
