= John Williams Andrews =

American poet (1898–1975)

John Williams Andrews (November 10, 1898 – March 18, 1975) was an American journalist, public relations professional, poet and author of non-fiction.

== Biography ==
Andrews was born in Bryn Mawr, Pennsylvania, on November 10, 1898, to Evangeline Holcombe Walker and noted historian Charles McLean Andrews. During his journalistic career he worked for Chung Mei in China before joining the Connecticut-based New Haven Register. After Yale Law School and acceptance to the New York State Bar Association, he began practicing with the law firm Root, Clark Buckner & Ballentine before leaving to write History of the Founding of Wolf's Head, and then became involved in the publication of poetry journals. In 1936, he wrote Prelude to 'Icaros', designed as the introduction to an epic about Charles Lindbergh's transatlantic flight.

In 1940, he joined the United States Justice Department as chief of the Federal-State Relations Section, and later as a trial attorney in the Antitrust Division.

He was director of the Washington Institute of Mental Health in 1951, then joined the public relations firm Hill & Knowlton before forming his own firm, Andrews Associaresm Inc., and retiring from the field in 1962.

In 1963, he was co-recipient of the Robert Frost Poetry Award, and edited Literary Quarterly and Poet Lore.

He died on March 18, 1975, aged 76.
