= John Andrews (historical writer) =

English historical writer and pamphleteer (1736–1809)

John Andrews (1736–1809) was a historical writer and pamphleteer.

== Works ==
Andrews produced numerous works. Among these are:

- History of the Revolutions of Denmark, etc., 1774.
- History of War with America, France, Spain, and Holland, commencing in 1775 and ending in 1783, four vols., London, 1785–86.
- Letters to his Excellency the Count de Welderen on the present Situation of Affairs between Great Britain and the United Provinces, London, 1781 (of which a Dutch translation appeared in the same year at Amsterdam).
- Letters to a Young Gentleman on his setting out for France, containing a survey of Paris and a review of French literature, 1784.
- Historical Review of the Moral, Religious, Literary, and Political Character of the English Nation, 1806.

The Gentleman's Magazine for February 1809 has the following obituary announcement: "At his house at Kennington, Surrey, in his seventy-third year, Dr. John Andrews, a gentleman well known in the literary world. By his death the nation is deprived of an able historian, a profound scholar and politician, and a man ever ready to take up his pen in his country's cause".
