= Eartham =

Village and parish in West Sussex, England

Coordinates: 50.87679°N 0.66671°W

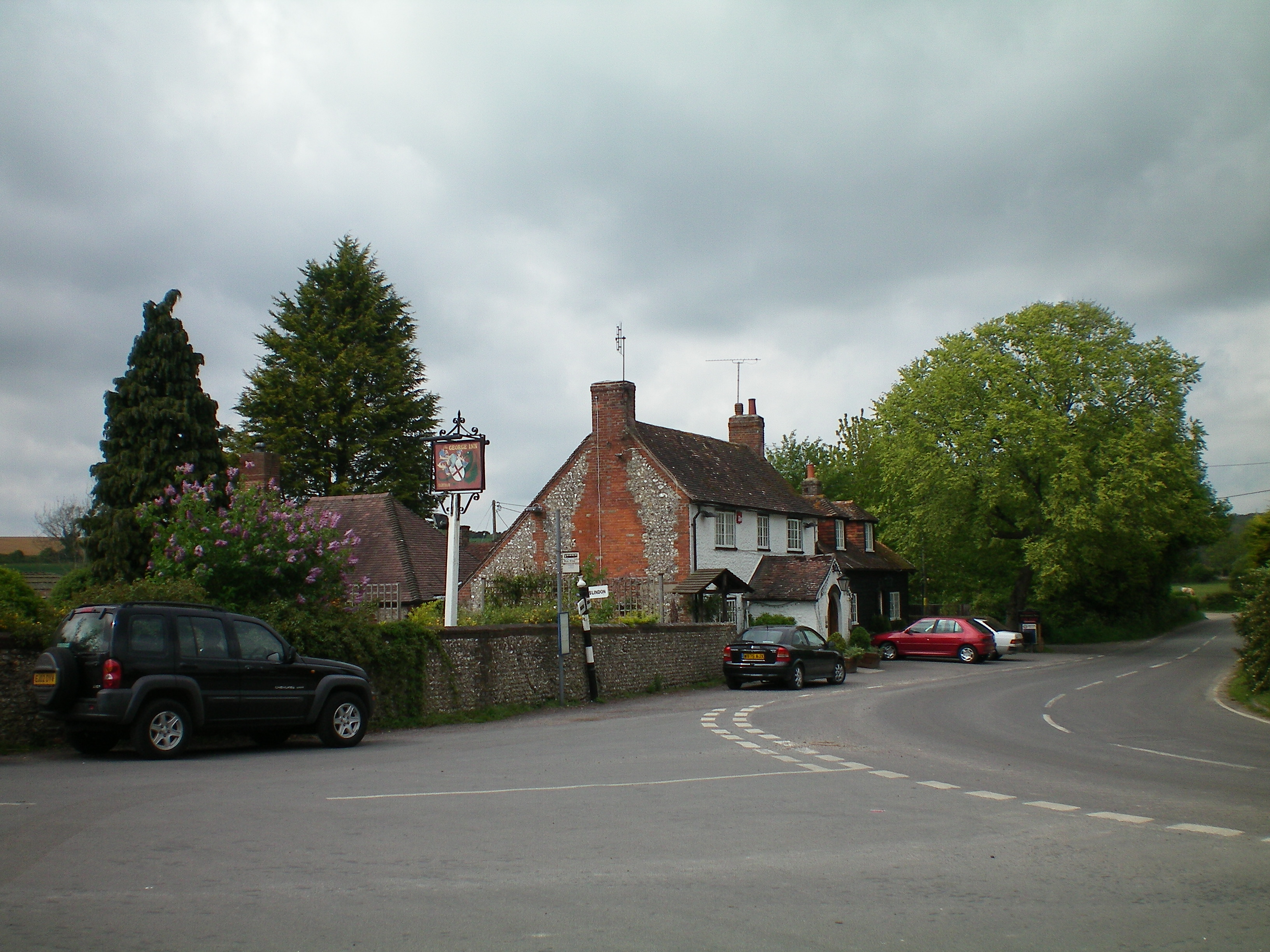
- The George pub

- Location within West Sussex
- Area: 8.36 km^{2} (3.23 sq mi)
- Population: 111. 2011 Census
  - Density: 12/km^{2} (31/sq mi)
- OS grid reference: SU939094
  - London: 49 miles (79 km) NNE
- Civil parish: Eartham
- District: Chichester
- Shire county: West Sussex
- Region: South East
- Country: England
- Sovereign state: United Kingdom
- Post town: CHICHESTER
- Postcode district: PO18
- Dialling code: 01243
- Police: Sussex
- Fire: West Sussex
- Ambulance: South East Coast
- UK Parliament: Chichester

Eartham is a village and civil parish in the District of Chichester in West Sussex, England located 8.5 kilometres (5.3 mi) northeast of Chichester east of the A285 road.

There is an Anglican parish church dedicated to St Margaret and a public house, The George, formerly The George and Dragon. The adjoining Manor Farm is the centre of a large farming enterprise. Nearby is Eartham House designed by Sir Edwin Lutyens which has been used since the 1920s as a private preparatory (junior) school, Great Ballard School. Eartham Wood to the north is an area of open access woodland, mostly beech trees through which the Roman road Stane Street runs. The route here today is followed only by bridleways and footpaths, and within Eartham Wood is part of the Monarch's Way long-distance path.

The parish has a land area of 836 hectares (2066 acres). In the 2001 census 104 people lived in 42 households, of whom 48 were economically active. At the 2011 Census the population including the hamlet of Upwaltham was 111.

== Eartham House ==
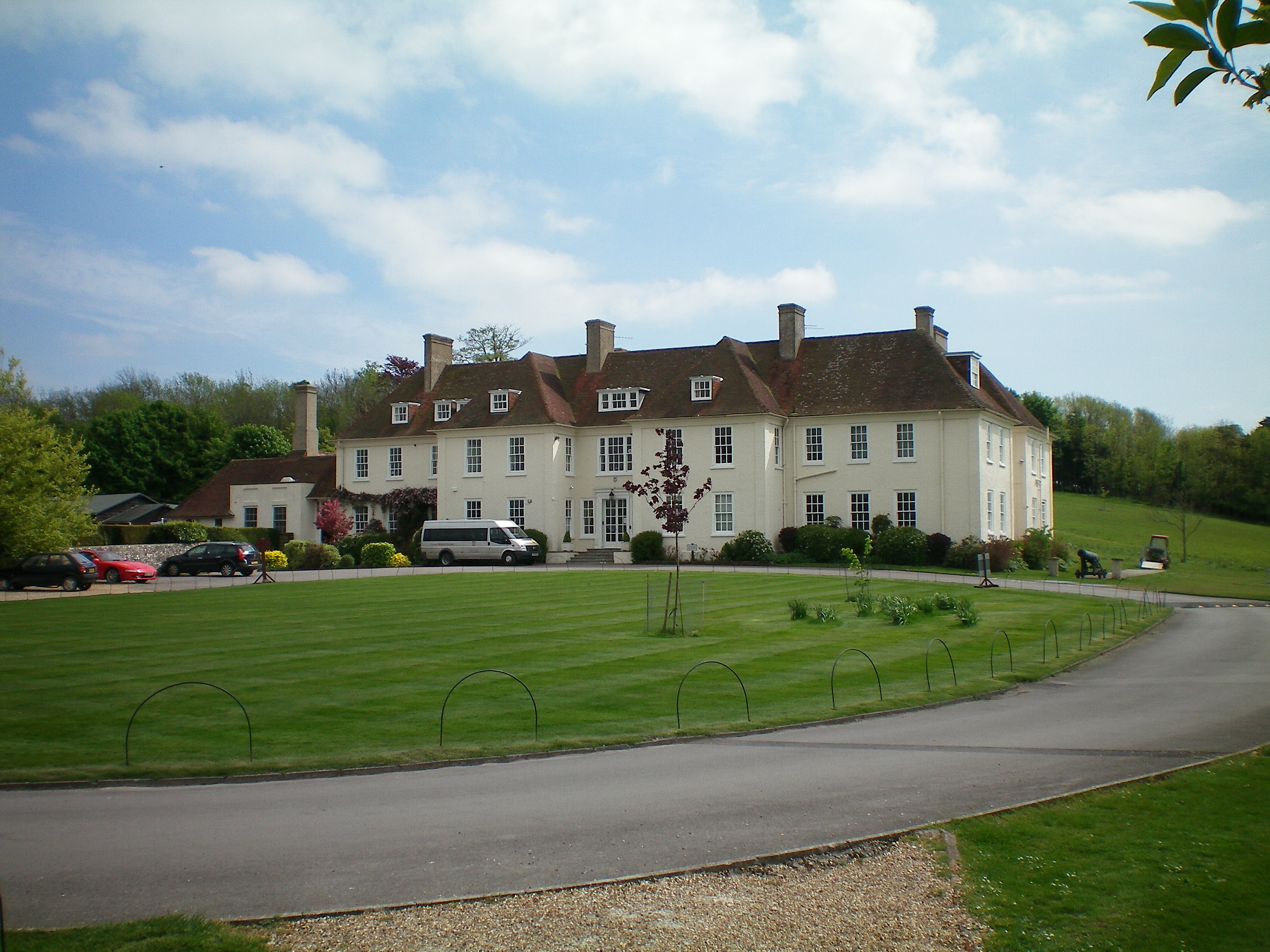
Great Ballard School at Eartham House

Eartham House was established by Thomas Hayley in 1743. Following his death the house became home to his son the poet William Hayley from 1774 to 1800. It was enlarged before he sold it to MP and statesman William Huskisson. The church contains a memorial to Hayley's son Thomas by his friend sculptor John Flaxman. The present building was designed by Sir Edwin Lutyens following the purchase of the house by William Bird in 1905.

The house is now occupied by Great Ballard School a co-educational independent school for children aged 2 to 13 years. It was founded in 1924 and moved to Eartham in 1961. The school caters for both day and boarding pupils.

== Notable residents ==
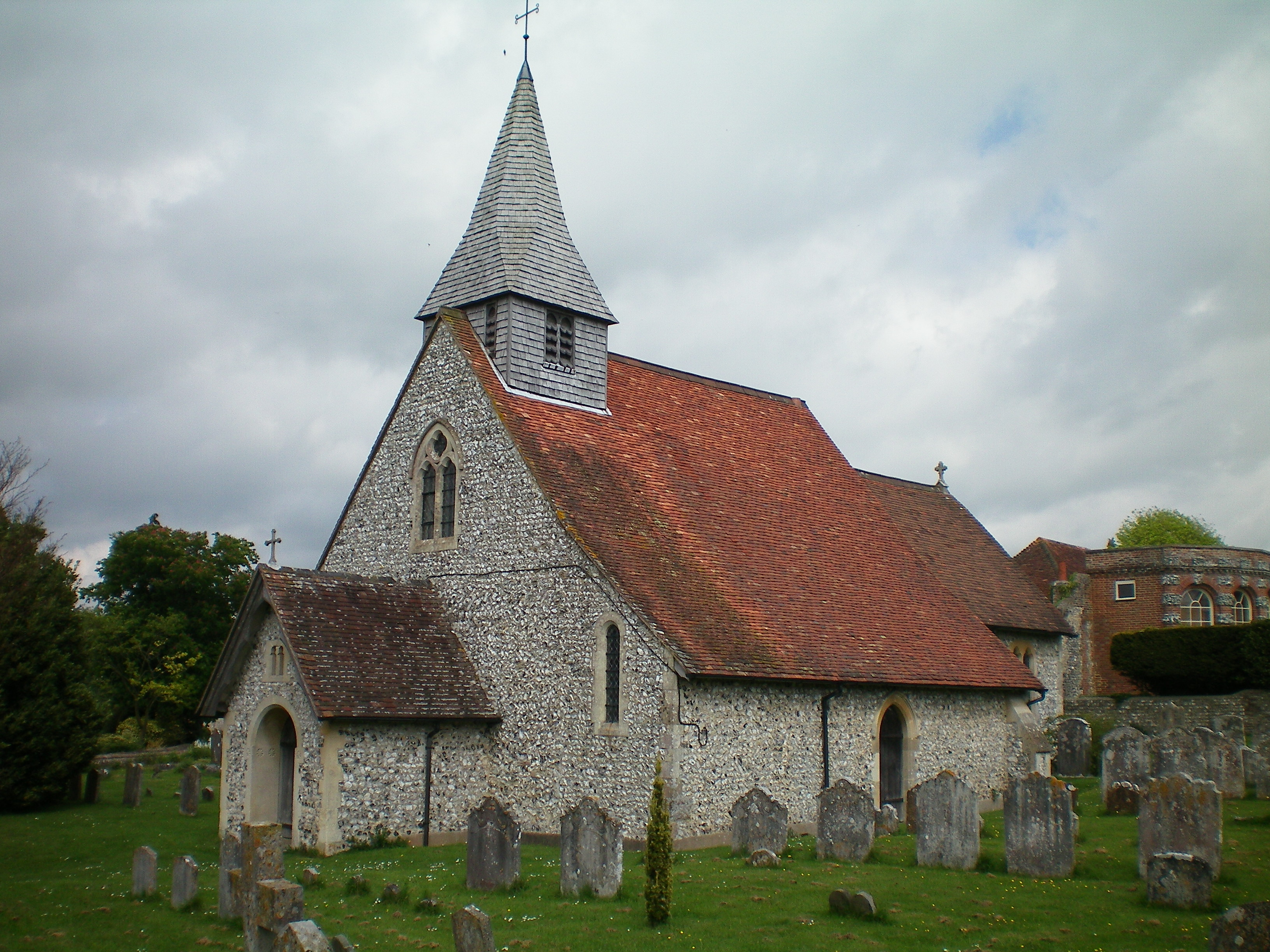
St. Margaret's Church

Richard Nyren, the famous Hambledon cricketer and landlord of the Bat & Ball Inn was born in Eartham c.1734.
