= John McArthur (Royal Navy officer) =

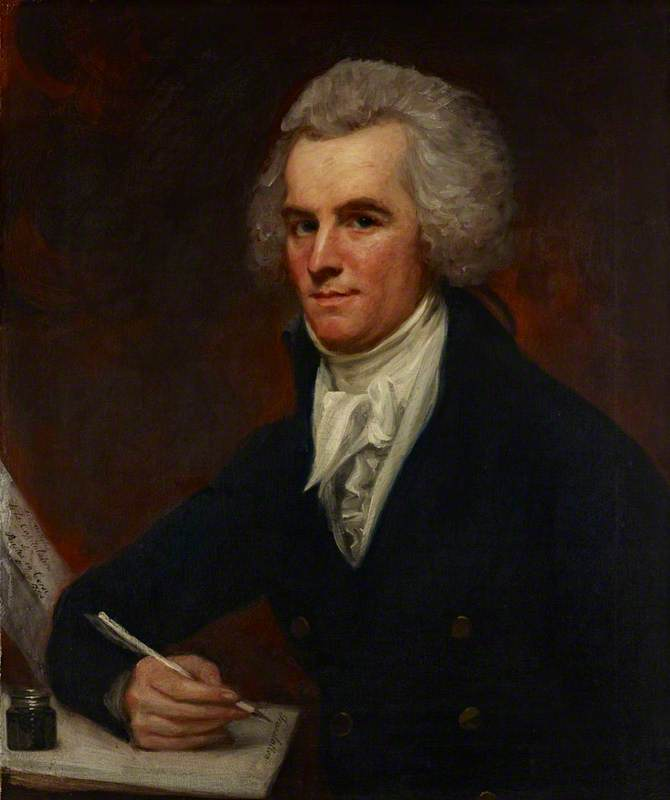
Portrait of John McArthur (1755–1840), painted by George Romney, 1795.

John McArthur (1755 – 29 July 1840) was a British sailor and author who served in the Royal Navy.

== Early life ==
McArthur entered the Royal Navy in 1778, as assistant clerk on board HMS Eagle on the North American station. When Eagle came home McArthur was moved into the cutter HMS Rattlesnake, and on 22 March 1779 was promoted to be purser of her, for his gallantry in boarding a French privateer in an engagement of the American Revolutionary War off Le Havre on 14 March. In November Rattlesnake lent her small assistance to HMS Tartar in capturing the Spanish frigate Santa Margarita; and, when the prize was commissioned for the Royal Navy, McArthur was promoted to be her purser.

== Work on signalling ==
During the war McArthur was often on duty, observing signals. In 1790, on his own account, he proposed a new code of signals to the Admiralty, which caught the attention of Lord Hood, then First Sea Lord, and when in the Russian armament of 1791, he hoisted his flag in command, he made McArthur his secretary. He hoped to try out McArthur's signals; but there was an issue about introducing a new code to supersede that of Lord Howe, and McArthur is said to have recast his, remodelling it on the basis of Howe's. After approval by Howe, it was tested and used in the experimental cruise of 1792.

While the new code was then adopted, Sir Home Popham's had generally taken over by the middle of the next decade. By 1799 McArthur was claiming to be the real author of the code known by the name of Lord Howe, but may have only seen it into print.

== Purser of Victory ==
In 1793, when Hood went out as commander-in-chief in the Mediterranean, McArthur was again his secretary, being appointed also purser of HMS Victory. His duties at this time were complex: correspondence in three foreign languages, interpreter, and as Hood's representative in disbursements of public money, both to the British forces and to those of the allies. For some time there was no English commissary-general, and he had to act in that capacity. He was also prize agent for the fleet; his duties as purser of Victory were performed by a deputy.

When Hood, after returning to England, was ordered to strike his flag, McArthur went back to the Mediterranean as simple purser of Victory. As soon as the ship joined the fleet, Rear-Admiral Robert Man hoisted his flag on board, and in the action of 14 July 1795 (see Battle of Hyères Islands) McArthur volunteered to observe the signals, in place of the admiral's secretary. He was later secretary to Sir Hyde Parker, and returned to England with him early in 1796.

== Later life ==
In 1803, when Lord Nelson was going out to the Mediterranean, he offered to take McArthur as his secretary. McArthur, however, declined, because Lord Hood's accounts were being audited. This was perhaps a pretext, however, since he was by then committed to writing.

On 22 July 1806 the university of Edinburgh conferred on him the degree of LL.D. He was at this time living in London, in York Place, Portman Square. Later he settled at Hayfield near Warblington in Hampshire, where he died 29 July 1840.

== Works ==
McArthur's major literary work, with James Stanier Clarke, was The Life of Lord Nelson, 1809, 2 vols. In 1799, also with Clarke, he founded the monthly Naval Chronicle, which ran to forty half-yearly volumes; it was mainly devoted to current naval matters, and biographical notes of the leading naval officers of the day, who often supplied material themselves. So far as it treats of contemporary events or persons, it is of very high authority. Other works were:

- The Army and Navy Gentleman's Companion, or a new and complete Treatise on the Theory and Practice of Fencing (1780).
- A Treatise of the Principles and Practice of Naval Courts-martial (1792), second edition Principles and Practice of Naval and Military Courts-martial (1805, 2 vols.) which became a standard work.
- Financial and Political Facts of the Eighteenth Century (1801), several editions.
- A Translation from the Italian of the Abbé Cesarotti's Historical and Critical Dissertation respecting the Controversy on the Authenticity of Ossian's Poems: with Notes and Observations by the Translator (1806), in which he described himself as one of the committee of the Highland Society of London appointed to superintend the publication of Ossian in the original Scottish Gaelic.

== Family ==
McArthur left a widow and, apparently, a daughter, Mrs. Conway.

== Notes ==
Attribution

This article incorporates text from a publication now in the public domain: Lee, Sidney, ed. (1893). "McArthur, John". Dictionary of National Biography. Vol. 34. London: Smith, Elder & Co.
