= List of vocal compositions by Robert Schumann =

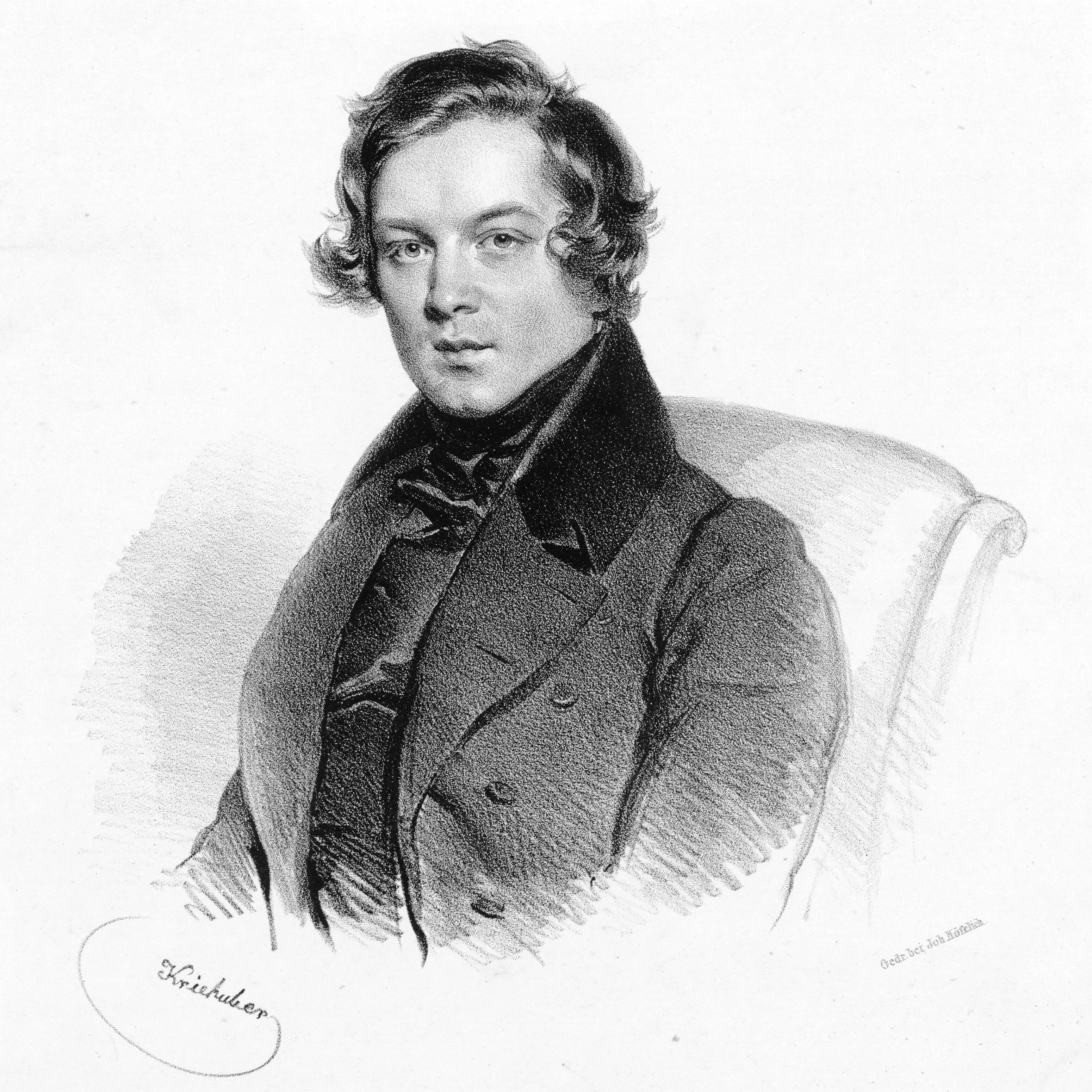
Schumann in a Josef Kriehuber etching from 1839, the year preceding his marriage to Clara. It was at this time that he began to compose vocal music prolifically.

The following is a list of the complete vocal output of Robert Schumann (8 June 1810 – 29 July 1856). Schumann was one of the most prolific composers of the nineteenth century. After producing almost only piano music during the early part of his career, he turned with such vigour in 1839–40 to vocal music that it made up the majority of his published work afterwards. His songs, part-songs and larger-scale vocal works were well-known and lucrative in his lifetime, and they have remained some of his most popular compositions.

This list is based upon the Thematisch-Bibliographisches Werkverzeichnis, a comprehensive catalogue of Schumann's works compiled by Margit L. McCorkle and published in 2003. Since Schumann's death scholars have made several separate attempts to catalogue his works not published with Opus number. The result is that one work may bear several separate tags, as designated by the various cataloguers. The list gives as a lemma any WoO (Werke ohne Opuszahl) number assigned traditionally to works published, or prepared for publication, by Schumann himself. Posthumous publication of a work prepared for the press by Schumann is indicated in brackets.

For works neither published nor prepared for publication by Schumann, RSW (Robert-Schumann-Werkverzeichnis) numbers, as assigned by McCorkle, are used. Hofmann-Keil (H/K) WoO numberings are given for some items in brackets; the catalogue Hofman and Keil prepared, though incomplete, was the most popular before the publication of McCorkle's, and the numbers they assigned are still occasionally used.

For a list of all Schumann's compositions, see List of compositions by Robert Schumann.

== Works for solo voice and piano ==
=== Lieder ===
==== Lieder published with Opus number ====
- Op. 24, Liederkreis (1840)

Texts by Heine.
1. Morgens steh' ich auf
2. Es treibt mich hin
3. Ich wandelte unter den Bäumen
4. Lieb' Liebchen
5. Schöne Wiege meine Leiden
6. Warte, warte, wilder Schiffsmann
7. Berg und Burgen schau'n herunter
8. Anfangs wollt' ich fast verzagen
9. Mit Myrthen und Rosen

- Op. 25, Myrthen, (published in 4 books) (1840)

1. Widmung; text by Friedrich Rückert

This song, whose title means 'dedication', is famous for its lyrical expression of Schumann's love for Clara. It has been arranged several times, most famously by Liszt for solo piano, and it appears thematically in the biographical film Song of Love.

2. Freisinn; text by Goethe
3. Der Nussbaum; text by Julius Mosen
4. Jemand; text by Wilhelm Gerhard (1780-1858), after Burns
5. Sitz' ich allein; text by Goethe
6. Setze mir nicht; text by Goethe
7. Die Lotosblume; text by Heine
8. Talismane; text by Goethe
9. Lied der Suleika; text by Marianne von Willemer and Goethe
10. Die Hochländer-Witwe; text by Wilhelm Gerhard, after Burns
11. Lied der Braut I (Mutter! Mutter!); text by Friedrich Rückert
12. Lied der Braut II (Lass mich ihm am Busen hangen); text by Friedrich Rückert
13. Hochländers Abschied; text by Wilhelm Gerhard, after Burns
14. Hochländers Wiegenlied; text by Wilhelm Gerhard, after Burns
15. Aus den hebräischen Gesängen (Mein Herz ist schwer); text by Karl Julius Körner (1793-1873), after Byron
16. Rätsel; text by Kannegiesser, after Catherine Maria Fanshawe
17. Zwei Venetianische Lieder I (Leis' rudern hier); text by Freiligrath, after Thomas Moore
18. Zwei Venetianische Lieder II (Wenn durch die Piazza); text by Freiligrath, after Thomas Moore
19. Hauptmanns Weib; text by Wilhelm Gerhard, after Burns
20. Weit, weit; text by Wilhelm Gerhard, after Burns
21. Was will die einsame Träne; text by Heine
22. Niemand; text by Wilhelm Gerhard, after Burns
23. Im Westen; text by Wilhelm Gerhard, after Burns
24. Du bist wie eine Blume; text by Heine
25. Aus den östlichen Rosen; text by Friedrich Rückert
26. Zum Schluss; text by Friedrich Rückert

- Op. 27, Lieder und Gesänge, Vol. I (1840)

1. Sag' an, o lieber Vogel mein; text by Friedrich Hebbel
2. Dem roten Röslein gleicht mein Lieb; text by Wilhelm Gerhard, after Burns
3. Was soll ich sagen?; text by Chamisso
4. Jasminenstrauch; text by Friedrich Rückert
5. Nur ein lächelnder Blick; text by Georg Wilhelm Zimmermann

- Op. 30, 3 Gedichte (1840)

Texts by Emanuel Geibel.
1. Der Knabe mit dem Wunderhorn
2. Der Page
3. Der Hidalgo

- Op. 31, 3 Gesänge (1840)

Texts by Chamisso.
1. Die Löwenbraut
2. Die Kartenlegerin
3. Die rote Hanne

Chorus ad libitum in this song, doubling piano and singer at various times.

- Op. 35, 12 Gedichte (1840)

Texts by Justinus Kerner.
1. Lust der Sturmnacht
2. Stirb, Lieb' und Freud'
3.Wanderlied
4. Erstes Grün
5. Sehnsucht nach der Waldgegend
6. Auf das Trinkglas eines verstorbenen Freundes
7. Wanderung
8. Stille Liebe
9. Frage
10. Stille Tränen
11. Wer machte dich so krank?
12. Alte Laute

- Op. 36, 6 Gedichte (1840)

Texts by Robert Reinick.
1. Sonntags am Rhein
2. Ständchen
3. Nichts Schöneres
4. An den Sonnenschein
5. Dichters Genesung
6. Liebesbotschaft

- Op. 39, Liederkreis (1840)

Texts by Eichendorff.
1. In der Fremde
2. Intermezzo
3. Waldesgespräch
4. Die Stille
5. Mondnacht
6. Schöne Fremde
7. Auf einer Burg
8. In der Fremde
9. Wehmut
10. Zwielicht
11. Im Walde
12. Frühlingsnacht

- Op. 40, 5 Lieder (1840)

Texts all by Chamisso, after Andersen's Danish, except No. 5, adapted from a French poem by Claude Charles Fauriel.
1. Märzveilchen
2. Muttertraum
3. Der Soldat
4. Der Spielmann
5. Verratene Liebe

- Op. 42, Frauenliebe und -leben (1840)

Texts by Chamisso.
1. Seit ich ihn gesehen
2. Er, der Herrlichste von allen
3. Ich kann's nicht fassen
4. Du Ring an meinem Finger
5. Helft mir, ihr Schwestern
6. Süsser Freund, du blickest
7. An meinem Herzen
8. Nun hast du mir der ersten Schmerz getan

- Op. 45, Romanzen und Balladen, Vol. I (1840)

1. Der Schatzgräber; text by Eichendorff
2. Frühlingsfahrt; text by Eichendorff
3. Abends am Strand; text by Heine

- Op. 48, Dichterliebe, (1840)

Texts by Heine.
1. Im wunderschönen Monat Mai
2. Aus meinen Tränen sprießen
3. Die Rose, die Lilie
4. Wenn ich in deine Augen seh'
5. Ich will meine Seele tauchen
6. Im Rhein, im heiligen Strome
7. Ich grolle nicht
8. Und wüssten's die Blumen
9. Das ist ein Flöten und Geigen
10. Hör' ich das Liedchen klingen
11. Ein Jüngling liebt ein Mädchen
12. Am leuchtenden Sommermorgen
13. Ich hab' im Traum geweinet
14. Allnächtlich im Traume
15. Aus alten Märchen winkt es
16. Die alten, bösen Lieder

- Op. 49, Romanzen und Balladen, Vol. II (1840)

1. Die beiden Grenadiere; text by Heine
2. Die feindlichen Brüder; text by Heine
3. Die Nonne; text by Abraham Emanuel Fröhlich

- Op. 51, Lieder und Gesänge, Vol. II (1842)

1. Sehnsucht; text by Emanuel Geibel
2. Volksliedchen; text by Friedrich Rückert
3. Ich wandre nicht; text by Carl Christern
4. Auf dem Rhein; text by Karl Immermann
5. Liebeslied; text by Goethe

- Op. 53, Romanzen und Balladen, Vol. III (1840)

1. Blondels Lied; text by Johann Gabriel Seidl
2. Loreley; text by Wilhelmine Lorenz
3. Der arme Peter; text by Heine

This song, like the poem it sets, is in three sections.

- Op. 57, Ballad 'Belsazar' (1840); text by Heine
- Op. 64, Romanzen und Balladen, Vol. IV (1841-1847)

1. Die Soldatenbraut; text by Eduard Mörike
2. Das verlassene Mägdelein; text by Mörike
3. Tragödie; text by Heine

This song, like the poem it sets, is in three sections.

- Op. 77, Lieder und Gesänge, Vol. III (1841-1850)

1. Der frohe Wandersmann; text by Eichendorff
2. Mein Garten; text by Fallersleben
3. Geisternähe; text by Friedrich Halm
4. Stiller Vorwurf; text by Oscar Ludwig Bernhard Wolff (1799-1851)
5. Aufträge; text by Christian L'Egru

- Op. 83, 3 Gesänge (1850)

1. Resignation
2. Die Blume der Ergebung; text by Friedrich Rückert
3. Der Einsiedler; text by Eichendorff

- Op. 87, Ballad 'Der Handschuh' (1850); text by Schiller
- Op. 89, 6 Gesänge (1850)

Texts by Wilfried von der Neun (1826-1916)
1. Es stürmet am Abendhimmel
2. Heimliches Verschwinden
3. Herbstlied
4. Abschied vom Walde
5. Ins Freie
6. Röselein, Röselein!

- Op. 90, 6 Gedichte und Requiem (1850)

All texts by Nikolaus Lenau, except No. 7, a translation from an anonymous Latin poem by Lebrecht Blücher Dreves.
1. Lied eines Schmiedes
2. Meine Rose
3. Kommen und Scheiden
4. Die Sennin
5. Einsamkeit
6. Der schwere Abend
7. Requiem

- Op. 95, 3 Gesänge (1849)

Texts by Karl Julius Körner (1793-1873), after Byron. Dedicated to Constanze Jacobi. Accompaniment may be played by either piano or harp.
1. Die Tochter Jephtas
2. An den Mond
3. Dem Helden

- Op. 96, Lieder und Gesänge, Vol. IV (1850)

1. Nachtlied; text by Goethe
2. Schneeglöckchen
3. Ihre Stimme; text by August von Platen-Hallermünde
4. Gesungen!; text by Wilfried von der Neun
5. Himmel und Erde; text by Wilfried von der Neun

- Op. 98a, Lieder und Gesänge aus 'Wilhelm Meister' (1849)

This work sets poems by Goethe from the novel Wilhelm Meister's Apprenticeship. It was published as a companion to the choral work with orchestra Requiem für Mignon, Op. 98b, composed immediately afterwards and based upon the same novel. Each song is for solo voice, but this is a dramatic work, a complete performance of which typically requires at least two voices and often three. No. 1 identical to Op. 79, No. 28.
1. Mignon (Kennst du das Land)
2. Ballade des Harfners
3. Nur wer die Sehnsucht kennt
4. Wie nie sein Brot mit Tränen aß
5. Heiss' mich nicht reden
6. Wer sich der Einsamkeit ergibt
7. Singet nicht in Trauertönen
8. An die Thüren will ich schleichen
9. So lasst mich scheinen, bis ich werde

- Op. 104, 7 Lieder (1851)

Texts by Elisabeth Kulmann.

1. Mond, meiner Seele Liebling
2. Viel Glück zur Reise
3. Du nennst mich armes Mädchen
4. Der Zeisig
5. Reich' mir die Hand
6. Die letzten Blumen starben
7. Gekämpft hat meine Barke

- Op. 107, 6 Gesänge (1851-1852)
- Op. 117, 4 Husarenlieder (1851)
- Op. 119, 3 Gedichte (1851)
- Op. 125, 5 heitere Gesänge (1851)
- Op. 127, 5 Lieder und Gesänge (1850-1851)
- Op. 135, Gedichte der Königin Maria Stuart (1852)
- Op. 142 (posthumous), 4 Gesänge (1852)

==== Lieder without Opus number published by Schumann or prepared by Schumann for publication ====
- WoO 5 (H/K WoO 1), Der deutsche Rhein (Patriotic Song) (1840)
- WoO 6 (H/K WoO 7), Soldatenlied (1844)

==== Lieder never published by Schumann ====
- RSW:op59:Anh (H/K WoO 18), Hirtenknaben-Gesang (1846)
- RSW:op79:Anh:1, Die Ammenuhr (1849)
- RSW:op79:Anh:2, Der weisse Hirsch (1848) (sketches)
- RSW:op79:Anh:3, Das Schwert (1849)
- RSW:op127:Anh (H/K WoO 26,1), Ein Gedanke (1840)
- RSW:Anh:M1,1, Verwandlung (1827)
- RSW:Anh:M1,2, Lied für XXX (1827)
- RSW:Anh:M2,1-11, 11 Songs (1827–28)

1. Die Weinende; text by Theodor Körner, after Byron
2. Kurzes Erwachen; text by Justinus Kerner
3. Gesanges Erwachen; text by Kerner
4. An Anna (I); text by Kerner
5. Sehnsucht; text by Schumann himself
6. Der Fischer; text by Goethe
7. An Anna (II); text by Kerner

This song formed the basis for the second movement of the first piano sonata in F♯ minor.

8. Im Herbste; text by Kerner
9. Hirtenknabe; text by Schumann himself
10. Erinnerung; text by Johann Georg Jacobi
11. Klage

This song is now lost.

- RSW:Anh:M2,1-5,10 (H/K WoO 21), 6 Jugendlieder for Voice and Piano (1827–28)
- RSW:Anh:M2,7-9 (H/K WoO 10, 2–4), Drei Jugendlieder for voice and piano (1827–28)
- RSW:Anh:M2,6 (H/K WoO 19), Der Fischer (Jugendlied) (1827–28)
- RSW:Anh:M3, Die Wallfahrt nach Kevelaer (1840)

A fragment.

- RSW:Anh:M4,1-2 (H/K WoO 11), Zwei Balladen for voice and piano (1840)
- RSW:Anh:M6 (H/K WoO 8), Albumblatt 'Auf Wiedersehn' für Niels W. Gade for Voice and Piano (1844)
- RSW:Anh:M11,1 (H/K WoO 26,2), Frühlingsgrüße (1851)

==== Arrangements of other composers' Lieder ====
- RSW:Anh:O7, E. Müller Sechs Lieder, revised (lost, 1837)

=== Declamations for speaker and piano ===
- Op. 106, Schön Hedwig (1849)
- Op. 122, 2 Ballads for Declamation (1852)

1. Ballade vom Heideknaben
2. Die Flüchtlinge

== Works for duet and piano ==
=== Duets published with Opus number ===
- Op. 34, 4 Duets for soprano and tenor (1840)
- Op. 37, Gedichte aus 'Liebesfrühling' (1840)

Mostly solo Lieder; No. 12 only for duet.

- Op. 43, 3 Zweistimmige Lieder (1840)
- Op. 78, 4 Duets, Op.78 (1849)
- Op. 79, Liederalbum für die Jugend (1849)

Nos. 9, 15, 18, 20 are duets; No. 24 is a trio ad libitum; No. 17 is with chorus ad libitum; No. 28 is identical to Op. 98a, No. 1.

- Op. 103, Mädchenlieder (4 duets) (1851)

=== Duets without Opus number published by Schumann or prepared by Schumann for publication ===
- WoO 7 (H/K WoO 9), Sommerruh for two voices and Piano (1849)

=== Duets never published by Schumann ===
- RSW:Anh:M14 (H/K WoO 26,3), Liedchen von Marie und Papa in F major for Two voices (1852)

== Part-songs ==
=== Part-songs for soloists and piano ===
- Op. 74, Spanisches Liederspiel (1849) (SATB)
- Op. 101, Minnespiel (1849)

Nos. 3 and 7 are duets; Nos. 5 and 10 are for SATB; the rest are solo songs.

- Op. 114, 3 Lieder für 3 Frauenstimmen (1853)
- Op. 138 (posthumous), Spanische Liebeslieder (1849)

For 4 voices, accompanied by 4-hands.

- Op. 29, 3 Gedichte (1840) (2-4 voices)

=== Part-songs for male chorus ===
==== Part-songs for male chorus published with Opus number ====
- Op. 33, 6 Lieder (1840)
- Op. 62, 3 Lieder für Männerchor (1847)
- Op. 65, Ritornelle in canonischen Weisen (1847)
- Op. 137 (posthumous), Jagdlieder (1849) (TTBB and 4 horns ad lib.)

==== Part-songs for male chorus without Opus number published by Schumann or prepared by Schumann for publication ====
- WoO 4 (H/K WoO 13–15), Drei Freiheitsgesänge (1848) für Männerchor mit Harmoniemusik

==== Part-songs for male chorus never published by Schumann ====
- RSW:op65:Anh:1-2, 2 Partsongs for Men's voices (1847) (supplement to Op.65)
- RSW:op65:Anh:1 (H/K WoO 12), Kanon für Männerstimmen (Rückert) (1847)
- RSW:op65:Anh:2 (H/K WoO 17), Kanon für Männerstimmen (Rückert) (1847)

=== Part-songs for female chorus ===
==== Part-songs for female chorus published with Opus number ====
- Op. 69, 6 Romanzen für Frauenstimmen Vol. I (1849) (piano ad libitum)
- Op. 91, 6 Romanzen für Frauenstimmen Vol. II (1849) (piano ad libitum)

==== Part-songs for female chorus never published by Schumann ====
- RSW:Anh:K1, Liederheft (lost, 1840)

=== Part-songs for mixed chorus ===
==== Part-songs for mixed chorus published with Opus number ====
- Op. 55, 5 Lieder (1846)

Texts by Wilhelm Gerhard (1780-1858), after Burns.
1. Das Hochlandmädchen
2. Zahnweh
3. Mich zieht es nach dem Dörfchen hin
4. Die alte gute Zeit
5. Hochlandbursch

This song uses SATB soloists as well as the chorus.

- Op. 59, 4 Gesänge (1846)
- Op. 67, Romanzen und Balladen, Vol. I (1849)

1. Der König von Thule; text by Goethe

This song uses a tenor soloist.

2. Schön-Rohtraut; text by Eduard Mörike
3. Heidenröslein; text by Goethe
4. Ungewitter; text by Adelbert von Chamisso
5. John Anderson; text by Wilhelm Gerhard after Burns

- Op. 75, Romanzen und Balladen, Vol. II (1849)
- Op. 84, Beim Abschied zu singen (1848)

With wind orchestra accompaniment.

- Op. 141 (posthumous), 4 doppelchörige Gesänge for two choruses (1849)
- Op. 145 (posthumous), Romanzen und Balladen, Vol. III (1849-1851)
- Op. 146 (posthumous), Romanzen und Balladen, Vol. IV (1849)

No. 5 calls for a soprano soloist, and introduces solo flute and horn parts.

==== Part-songs for mixed chorus never published by Schumann ====
- RSW:Anh:L3, Glockentürmers Töchterlein (1851)
- RSW:Anh:M15 (H/K WoO 26,4), Die Orange und Myrte for Choir SATB and Piano (1853)

== Canons ==
- Op. 68 Anh., Fest im Takt, im Tone rein (1850)

A canon intended for performance by voices a cappella

== Choral works with orchestra ==
=== Religious choral works ===
==== Religious choral works published with Opus number ====
- Op. 71, Adventlied (1848)

For soprano, chorus, and orchestra.

- Op. 93, Motet 'Verzweifle nicht im Schmerzenstal' (1849-1852)

For two TTBB choirs; organ ad libitum.

- Op. 147 (posthumous), Mass in C minor (1852) (with organ)
- Op. 148 (posthposthumous, Requiem (1852)

==== Religious choral works never published by Schumann ====
- RSW:Anh:I10, Psalm 150 for Choir and Orchestra (1822)

An early work which the twelve-year-old Schumann designated his Opus 1, despite its never being published.

==== Arrangements of other composers' religious choral Works ====
- RSW:Anh:O1, J.S. Bach Johannespassion BWV 245 (1848/1851)

Schumann produced an arrangement for full Romantic orchestra, with added clarinet, oboe and trumpet parts.

=== Dramatic choral works ===
==== Dramatic choral works published with Opus number ====
- Op. 50, Oratorio, Das Paradies und die Peri (1841-1843)
- Op. 112, Oratorio, Der Rose Pilgerfahrt (1851)
- Op. 115, Manfred (1848)

Overture and incidental music using the text of Byron's play; uses a speaking narrator.

- Op. 116, Der Königssohn (1851)
- Op. 140 (posthumous), Vom Pagen und der Königstochter

Uses SATB soloists.

- Op. 143 (posthumous), Das Glück von Edenhall

For tenor and bass soloists, TTBB choir and orchestra.

==== Dramatic choral works without Opus number published by Schumann or prepared by Schumann for publication ====
- WoO 3, (H/K WoO 3) Szenen aus Goethes Faust (1844–53)

=== Secular choral works ===
==== Secular choral works published with Opus number ====
- Op. 98b, Requiem für Mignon (1849)

Uses several soloists.

- Op. 108, Nachtlied (1849)
- Op. 123, Overture 'Rheinweinlied' (1853)

Uses a tenor soloist and SATB, but also arranged by Schumann for tenor soloist with TTBB.

- Op. 139 (posthumous), Des Sängers Fluch (1852)

Uses several soloists.

- Op. 144 (posthumous), Neujahrslied (1849)

Uses a baritone soloist.

==== Secular choral works never published by Schumann ====
- RSW:op64:Anh, Tragödie for Choir and Orchestra (1841)
- RSW:Anh:I9, Chor von Landleuten, Overture & Chorus for Choir and Orchestra (1822)

An early work.

== Opera ==
=== Opera published with Opus number ===
- Op. 81, Genoveva (1847-1850)

=== Opera never published by Schumann ===
- RSW:Anh:H5, Der Corsar (1844)

One chorus and one aria survive.

== Unpublished notebooks containing vocal music ==
- RSW:Anh:R11, Brautbuch (1837–39)
- RSW:Anh:R12, Liederbuch 1 (1840)
- RSW:Anh:R13, Liederbuch 2 (1840)
- RSW:Anh:R14, Liederbuch 3 (1840–47)
- RSW:Anh:R18, Choralsätze (1854–56)

== Sortable list of songs ==
Work number	Cycle	Title	Translation	Librettist(s)	Scoring	Date of composition	Date of publication	Publisher	Notes
Op. 24, No. 1	Liederkreis	Morgens steh' ich auf	Each morning I get up	Heine	Solo voice and piano	1840	1840		
Op. 24, No. 2	Liederkreis	Es treibt mich hin	It urges me here	Heine	Solo voice and piano	1840	1840		
Op. 24, No. 3	Liederkreis	Ich wandelte unter den Bäumen	I strolled beneath the trees	Heine	Solo voice and piano	1840	1840		
Op. 24, No. 4	Liederkreis	Lieb' Liebchen	Dear Darling	Heine	Solo voice and piano	1840	1840		
Op. 24, No. 5	Liederkreis	Schöne Wiege meine Leiden	Lovely cradle of my sorrows	Heine	Solo voice and piano	1840	1840		
Op. 24, No. 6	Liederkreis	Warte, warte, wilder Schiffsmann	Wait, wait, wild seaman	Heine	Solo voice and piano	1840	1840		
Op. 24, No. 7	Liederkreis	Berg und Burgen schau'n herunter	Mountain and castles look down below	Heine	Solo voice and piano	1840	1840		
Op. 24, No. 8	Liederkreis	Anfangs wollt' ich fast verzagen	At first I almost wanted to despair	Heine	Solo voice and piano	1840	1840		
Op. 24, No. 9	Liederkreis	Mit Myrthen und Rosen	With myrtles and roses	Heine	Solo voice and piano	1840	1840		
Op. 25, Book 1, No. 1	Myrthen	Widmung	Dedication	Friedrich Rückert	Solo voice and piano	1840	1840		
Op. 25, Book 1, No. 2	Myrthen	Freisinn	Free spirit	Goethe	Solo voice and piano	1840	1840		
Op. 25, Book 1, No. 3	Myrthen	Der Nussbaum	The (Wal)nut Tree	Julius Mosen	Solo voice and piano	1840	1840		
Op. 25, Book 1, No. 4	Myrthen	Jemand	Someone	Burns, trans. Wilhelm Gerhard	Solo voice and piano	1840	1840		
Op. 25, Book 1, No. 5	Myrthen	Sitz' ich allein	I sit alone	Goethe	Solo voice and piano	1840	1840		
Op. 25, Book 1, No. 6	Myrthen	Setze mir nicht	Do not set down for me	Goethe	Solo voice and piano	1840	1840		
Op. 25, Book 2, No. 7	Myrthen	Die Lotosblume	The Lotus Flower	Heine	Solo voice and piano	1840	1840		
Op. 25, Book 2, No. 8	Myrthen	Talismane	Talisman	Goethe	Solo voice and piano	1840	1840		
Op. 25, Book 2, No. 9	Myrthen	Lied der Suleika	Suleika's Song	Marianne von Willemer, Goethe	Solo voice and piano	1840	1840		
Op. 25, Book 2, No. 10	Myrthen	Die Hochländer-Witwe	The Highlander's Widow	Burns, trans. Wilhelm Gerhard	Solo voice and piano	1840	1840		
Op. 25, Book 2, No. 11	Myrthen	Lied der Braut I (Mutter! Mutter!)	The Bride's Song I (Mother! Mother!)	Friedrich Rückert	Solo voice and piano	1840	1840		
Op. 25, Book 2, No. 12	Myrthen	Lied der Braut II (Lass mich ihm am Busen hangen)	The Bride's Song II (Let me rest upon his chest)	Friedrich Rückert	Solo voice and piano	1840	1840		
Op. 25, Book 3, No. 13	Myrthen	Hochländers Abschied	Highlander's Farewell	Burns, trans. Wilhelm Gerhard	Solo voice and piano	1840	1840		
Op. 25, Book 3, No. 14	Myrthen	Hochländers Wiegenlied	Highlander's Lullaby	Burns, trans. Wilhelm Gerhard	Solo voice and piano	1840	1840		
Op. 25, Book 3, No. 15	Myrthen	Aus den hebräischen Gesängen (Mein Herz ist schwer)	From the "Hebrew Melodies" (My heart is heavy)	Byron, trans. Karl Julius Körner (1793-1873)	Solo voice and piano	1840	1840		
Op. 25, Book 3, No. 16	Myrthen	Rätsel	Riddle	Catherine Maria Fanshawe, trans. Kannegiesser	Solo voice and piano	1840	1840		
Op. 25, Book 3, No. 17	Myrthen	Zwei Venetianische Lieder I (Leis' rudern hier)	Two Venetian songs I (Row softly here)	Thomas Moore, trans. Freiligrath	Solo voice and piano	1840	1840		
Op. 25, Book 3, No. 18	Myrthen	Zwei Venetianische Lieder II Wenn durch die Piazza	Two Venetian songs II (When through the piazza)	Thomas Moore, trans. Freiligrath	Solo voice and piano	1840	1840		
Op. 25, Book 4, No. 19	Myrthen	Hauptmanns Weib	The Captain's Wife	Burns, trans.Wilhelm Gerhard	Solo voice and piano	1840	1840		
Op. 25, Book 4, No. 20	Myrthen	Weit, weit	Far, far	Burns, trans. Wilhelm Gerhard	Solo voice and piano	1840	1840		
Op. 25, Book 4, No. 21	Myrthen	Was will die einsame Träne	What does the lonely tear want	Heine	Solo voice and piano	1840	1840		
Op. 25, Book 4, No. 22	Myrthen	Niemand	Nobody	Burns, trans. Wilhelm Gerhard	Solo voice and piano	1840	1840		
Op. 25, Book 4, No. 23	Myrthen	Im Westen	In the west	Burns, trans. Wilhelm Gerhard	Solo voice and piano	1840	1840		
Op. 25, Book 4, No. 24	Myrthen	Du bist wie eine Blume	You are like a flower	Heine	Solo voice and piano	1840	1840		
Op. 25, Book 4, No. 25	Myrthen	Aus den östlichen Rosen	From the eastern roses	Friedrich Rückert	Solo voice and piano	1840	1840		
Op. 25, Book 4, No. 26	Myrthen	Zum Schluss	To the last	Friedrich Rückert	Solo voice and piano	1840	1840		
Op. 27, No. 1	Lieder und Gesänge, Vol. I	Sag' an, o lieber Vogel mein	Say, o dear bird of mine	Friedrich Hebbel	Solo voice and piano	1840	May 1849		
Op. 27, No. 2	Lieder und Gesänge, Vol. I	Dem roten Röslein gleicht mein Lieb	My love's like a red, red rose	Burns, trans. Wilhelm Gerhard	Solo voice and piano	1840	May 1849		
Op. 27, No. 3	Lieder und Gesänge, Vol. I	Was soll ich sagen?	What should I say?	Chamisso	Solo voice and piano	1840	May 1849		
Op. 27, No. 4	Lieder und Gesänge, Vol. I	Jasminenstrauch	The Jasmine Bush	Friedrich Rückert	Solo voice and piano	1840	May 1849		
Op. 27, No. 5	Lieder und Gesänge, Vol. I	Nur ein lächelnder Blick	Only a smiling look	Georg Wilhelm Zimmermann	Solo voice and piano	1840	May 1849		
Op. 30, No. 1	3 Gedichte	Der Knabe mit dem Wunderhorn	The Boy with the Magic Horn	Emanuel Geibel	Solo voice and piano	1840	December 1840		
Op. 30, No. 2	3 Gedichte	Der Page	The Page	Emanuel Geibel	Solo voice and piano	1840	December 1840		
Op. 30, No. 3	3 Gedichte	Der Hidalgo	The Hidalgo	Emanuel Geibel	Solo voice and piano	1840	December 1840		
Op. 31, No. 1	3 Gesänge	Die Löwenbraut	The Lion's Bride	Chamisso	Solo voice and piano	1840			
Op. 31, No. 2	3 Gesänge	Die Kartenlegerin	The Tarot Woman	Chamisso	Solo voice and piano	1840			
Op. 31, No. 3	3 Gesänge	Die rote Hanne	Redhead Hanne	Chamisso	Solo voice and piano	1840			Chorus ad libitum
Op. 35, No. 1	12 Gedichte	Lust der Sturmnacht	Stormy Night's Pleasure	Justinus Kerner	Solo voice and piano	1840			
Op. 35, No. 2	12 Gedichte	Stirb, Lieb' und Freud	Die, Love and Joy	Justinus Kerner	Solo voice and piano	1840			
Op. 35, No. 3	12 Gedichte	Wanderlied	Travelling Song	Justinus Kerner	Solo voice and piano	1840			
Op. 35, No. 4	12 Gedichte	Erstes Grün	First Green	Justinus Kerner	Solo voice and piano	1840			
Op. 35, No. 5	12 Gedichte	Sehnsucht nach der Waldgegend	Longing for Woodland	Justinus Kerner	Solo voice and piano	1840			
Op. 35, No. 6	12 Gedichte	Auf das Trinkglas eines verstorbenen Freundes	To the drinking-glass of a friend passed away	Justinus Kerner	Solo voice and piano	1840			
Op. 35, No. 7	12 Gedichte	Wanderung	Wandering	Justinus Kerner	Solo voice and piano	1840			
Op. 35, No. 8	12 Gedichte	Stille Liebe	Silent Love	Justinus Kerner	Solo voice and piano	1840			
Op. 35, No. 9	12 Gedichte	Frage	Question	Justinus Kerner	Solo voice and piano	1840			
Op. 35, No. 10	12 Gedichte	Stille Tränen	Silent Tears	Justinus Kerner	Solo voice and piano	1840			
Op. 35, No. 11	12 Gedichte	Wer machte dich so krank?	Who made you so ill?	Justinus Kerner	Solo voice and piano	1840			
Op. 35, No. 12	12 Gedichte	Alte Laute	Olden sounds	Justinus Kerner	Solo voice and piano	1840			
Op. 36, No. 1	6 Gedichte	Sonntags am Rhein	Sunday on the Rhine	Robert Reinick	Solo voice and piano	1840			
Op. 36, No. 2	6 Gedichte	Ständchen	Serenade	Robert Reinick	Solo voice and piano	1840			
Op. 36, No. 3	6 Gedichte	Nichts Schöneres	Nothing more beautiful	Robert Reinick	Solo voice and piano	1840			
Op. 36, No. 4	6 Gedichte	An den Sonnenschein	To the Sunshine	Robert Reinick	Solo voice and piano	1840			
Op. 36, No. 5	6 Gedichte	Dichters Genesung	Poet's Convalescence	Robert Reinick	Solo voice and piano	1840			
Op. 36, No. 6	6 Gedichte	Liebesbotschaft	News of Love	Robert Reinick	Solo voice and piano	1840			
Op. 39, No. 1	Liederkreis	In der Fremde	In Foreign Lands	Eichendorff	Solo voice and piano	1840			
Op. 39, No. 2	Liederkreis	Intermezzo	Intermezzo	Eichendorff	Solo voice and piano	1840			
Op. 39, No. 3	Liederkreis	Waldesgespräch	Forest Conversation	Eichendorff	Solo voice and piano	1840			
Op. 39, No. 4	Liederkreis	Die Stille	Silence	Eichendorff	Solo voice and piano	1840			
Op. 39, No. 5	Liederkreis	Mondnacht	Moon-night	Eichendorff	Solo voice and piano	1840			
Op. 39, No. 6	Liederkreis	Schöne Fremde	Beautiful foreign lands	Eichendorff	Solo voice and piano	1840			
Op. 39, No. 7	Liederkreis	Auf einer Burg	At a Castle	Eichendorff	Solo voice and piano	1840			
Op. 39, No. 8	Liederkreis	In der Fremde	In Foreign Lands	Eichendorff	Solo voice and piano	1840			
Op. 39, No. 9	Liederkreis	Wehmut	Wistfulness	Eichendorff	Solo voice and piano	1840			
Op. 39, No. 10	Liederkreis	Zwielicht	Twilight	Eichendorff	Solo voice and piano	1840			
Op. 39, No. 11	Liederkreis	Im Walde	In the Woods	Eichendorff	Solo voice and piano	1840			
Op. 39, No. 12	Liederkreis	Frühlingsnacht	Spring Night	Eichendorff	Solo voice and piano	1840			
Op. 40, No. 1	5 Lieder	Märzveilchen		Andersen, trans. Chamisso	Solo voice and piano	1840			
Op. 40, No. 2	5 Lieder	Muttertraum		Andersen, trans. Chamisso	Solo voice and piano	1840			
Op. 40, No. 3	5 Lieder	Der Soldat		Andersen, trans. Chamisso	Solo voice and piano	1840			
Op. 40, No. 4	5 Lieder	Der Spielmann		Andersen, trans. Chamisso	Solo voice and piano	1840			
Op. 40, No. 5	5 Lieder	Verratene Liebe		Fauriel, trans. Chamisso	Solo voice and piano	1840			
Op. 42, No. 1	Frauenliebe und -leben	Seit ich ihn gesehen		Chamisso	Solo voice and piano	1840			
Op. 42, No. 2	Frauenliebe und -leben	Er, der Herrlichste von allen		Chamisso	Solo voice and piano	1840			
Op. 42, No. 3	Frauenliebe und -leben	Ich kann's nicht fassen		Chamisso	Solo voice and piano	1840			
Op. 42, No. 4	Frauenliebe und -leben	Du Ring an meinem Finger		Chamisso	Solo voice and piano	1840			
Op. 42, No. 5	Frauenliebe und -leben	Helft mir, ihr Schwestern		Chamisso	Solo voice and piano	1840			
Op. 42, No. 6	Frauenliebe und -leben	Süsser Freund, du blickest		Chamisso	Solo voice and piano	1840			
Op. 42, No. 7	Frauenliebe und -leben	An meinem Herzen		Chamisso	Solo voice and piano	1840			
Op. 42, No. 8	Frauenliebe und -leben	Nun hast du mir der ersten Schmerz getan		Chamisso	Solo voice and piano	1840			
Op. 42, No. 1	Romanzen und Balladen, Vol. I	Der Schatzgräber		Eichendorff	Solo voice and piano	1840			
Op. 42, No. 2	Romanzen und Balladen, Vol. I	Frühlingsfahrt		Eichendorff	Solo voice and piano	1840			
Op. 42, No. 3	Romanzen und Balladen, Vol. I	Abends am Strand		Heine	Solo voice and piano	1840			
Op. 48, No. 1	Dichterliebe	Im wunderschönen Monat Mai		Heine	Solo voice and piano	1840			
Op. 48, No. 2	Dichterliebe	Aus meinen Tränen sprießen		Heine	Solo voice and piano	1840			
Op. 48, No. 3	Dichterliebe	Die Rose, die Lilie		Heine	Solo voice and piano	1840			
Op. 48, No. 4	Dichterliebe	Wenn ich in deine Augen seh		Heine	Solo voice and piano	1840			
Op. 48, No. 5	Dichterliebe	Ich will meine Seele tauchen		Heine	Solo voice and piano	1840			
Op. 48, No. 6	Dichterliebe	Im Rhein, im heiligen Strome		Heine	Solo voice and piano	1840			
Op. 48, No. 7	Dichterliebe	Ich grolle nicht		Heine	Solo voice and piano	1840			
Op. 48, No. 8	Dichterliebe	Und wüssten's die Blumen		Heine	Solo voice and piano	1840			
Op. 48, No. 9	Dichterliebe	Das ist ein Flöten und Geigen		Heine	Solo voice and piano	1840			
Op. 48, No. 10	Dichterliebe	Hör' ich das Liedchen klingen		Heine	Solo voice and piano	1840			
Op. 48, No. 11	Dichterliebe	Ein Jüngling liebt ein Mädchen		Heine	Solo voice and piano	1840			
Op. 48, No. 12	Dichterliebe	Am leuchtenden Sommermorgen		Heine	Solo voice and piano	1840			
Op. 48, No. 13	Dichterliebe	Ich hab' im Traum geweinet		Heine	Solo voice and piano	1840			
Op. 48, No. 14	Dichterliebe	Allnächtlich im Traume		Heine	Solo voice and piano	1840			
Op. 48, No. 15	Dichterliebe	Aus alten Märchen winkt es		Heine	Solo voice and piano	1840			
Op. 48, No. 16	Dichterliebe	Die alten, bösen Lieder		Heine	Solo voice and piano	1840			
Op. 49, No. 1	Romanzen und Balladen, Vol. II	Die beiden Grenadiere		Heine	Solo voice and piano	1840			
Op. 49, No. 2	Romanzen und Balladen, Vol. II	Die feindlichen Brüder		Heine	Solo voice and piano	1840			
Op. 49, No. 3	Romanzen und Balladen, Vol. II	Die Nonne		Abraham Emanuel Fröhlich	Solo voice and piano	1840			
Op. 51, No. 1	Lieder und Gesänge, Vol. II	Sehnsucht		Emanuel Geibel	Solo voice and piano	1842			
Op. 51, No. 2	Lieder und Gesänge, Vol. II	Volksliedchen		Friedrich Rückert	Solo voice and piano	1842			
Op. 51, No. 3	Lieder und Gesänge, Vol. II	Ich wandre nicht		Carl Christern	Solo voice and piano	1842			
Op. 51, No. 4	Lieder und Gesänge, Vol. II	Auf dem Rhein		Karl Immermann	Solo voice and piano	1842			
Op. 51, No. 5	Lieder und Gesänge, Vol. II	Liebeslied		Goethe	Solo voice and piano	1842			
Op. 53, No. 1	Romanzen und Balladen, Vol. III	Blondels Lied		Johann Gabriel Seidl	Solo voice and piano	1840			
Op. 53, No. 2	Romanzen und Balladen, Vol. III	Loreley		Wilhelmine Lorenz	Solo voice and piano	1840			
Op. 53, No. 3	Romanzen und Balladen, Vol. III	Der arme Peter		Heine	Solo voice and piano	1840			In three sections
Op. 57		Ballad "Belsazar"		Heine	Solo voice and piano	1840			
Op. 64, No. 1	Romanzen und Balladen, Vol. IV	Die Soldatenbraut		Eduard Mörike	Solo voice and piano	1847			
Op. 64, No. 2	Romanzen und Balladen, Vol. IV	Das verlassene Mägdelein		Eduard Mörike	Solo voice and piano	1847			
Op. 64, No. 3	Romanzen und Balladen, Vol. IV	Tragödie		Heine	Solo voice and piano	1841			In three sections
Op. 77, No. 1	Lieder und Gesänge, Vol. III	Der frohe Wandersmann		Eichendorff	Solo voice and piano	1840	1851		
Op. 77, No. 2	Lieder und Gesänge, Vol. III	Mein Garten		Fallersleben	Solo voice and piano	1850	1851		
Op. 77, No. 3	Lieder und Gesänge, Vol. III	Geisternähe		Friedrich Halm	Solo voice and piano	1850	1851		
Op. 77, No. 4	Lieder und Gesänge, Vol. III	Stiller Vorwurf		Oscar Ludwig Bernhard Wolff 1799-1851	Solo voice and piano	1850	1851		
Op. 77, No. 5	Lieder und Gesänge, Vol. III	Aufträge		Christian L'Egru	Solo voice and piano	1850	1851		
Op. 83, No. 1	3 Gesänge	Resignation		Julius Buddeus?	Solo voice and piano	1850			
Op. 83, No. 2	3 Gesänge	Die Blume der Ergebung		Friedrich Rückert	Solo voice and piano	1850			
Op. 83, No. 3	3 Gesänge	Der Einsiedler		Eichendorff	Solo voice and piano	1850			
Op. 87		Ballad "Der Handschuh"		Schiller	Solo voice and piano	1850			
Op. 89, No. 1	6 Gesänge	Es stürmet am Abendhimmel		Wilfried von der Neun	Solo voice and piano	1850			
Op. 89, No. 2	6 Gesänge	Heimliches Verschwinden		Wilfried von der Neun	Solo voice and piano	1850			
Op. 89, No. 3	6 Gesänge	Herbstlied		Wilfried von der Neun	Solo voice and piano	1850			
Op. 89, No. 4	6 Gesänge	Abschied vom Walde		Wilfried von der Neun	Solo voice and piano	1850			
Op. 89, No. 5	6 Gesänge	Ins Freie		Wilfried von der Neun	Solo voice and piano	1850			
Op. 89, No. 6	6 Gesänge	Röselein, Röselein!		Wilfried von der Neun	Solo voice and piano	1850			
Op. 90, No. 1	6 Gedichte und Requiem	Lied eines Schmiedes		Nikolaus Lenau	Solo voice and piano	1850			
Op. 90, No. 2	6 Gedichte und Requiem	Meine Rose		Nikolaus Lenau	Solo voice and piano	1850			
Op. 90, No. 3	6 Gedichte und Requiem	Kommen und Scheiden		Nikolaus Lenau	Solo voice and piano	1850			
Op. 90, No. 4	6 Gedichte und Requiem	Die Sennin		Nikolaus Lenau	Solo voice and piano	1850			
Op. 90, No. 5	6 Gedichte und Requiem	Einsamkeit		Nikolaus Lenau	Solo voice and piano	1850			
Op. 90, No. 6	6 Gedichte und Requiem	Der schwere Abend		Nikolaus Lenau	Solo voice and piano	1850			
Op. 90, No. 7	6 Gedichte und Requiem	Requiem		Anonymous, trans. Lebrecht Blücher Dreves	Solo voice and piano	1850			
Op. 95, No. 1	3 Gesänge	Die Tochter Jephtas		Byron, trans. Karl Julius Körner (1793-1873)	Solo voice and piano or harp	1849			Published with a dedication to Constanze Jacobi
Op. 95, No. 2	3 Gesänge	An den Mond		Byron, trans. Karl Julius Körner (1793-1873)	Solo voice and piano or harp	1849			Published with a dedication to Constanze Jacobi
Op. 95, No. 3	3 Gesänge	Dem Helden		Byron, trans. Karl Julius Körner (1793-1873)	Solo voice and piano or harp	1849			Published with a dedication to Constanze Jacobi
Op. 96, No. 1	Lieder und Gesänge, Vol. IV	Nachtlied		Goethe	Solo voice and piano	1850			
Op. 96, No. 2	Lieder und Gesänge, Vol. IV	Schneeglöckchen		Anonymous	Solo voice and piano	1850			
Op. 96, No. 3	Lieder und Gesänge, Vol. IV	Ihre Stimme		August von Platen-Hallermünde	Solo voice and piano	1850			
Op. 96, No. 4	Lieder und Gesänge, Vol. IV	Gesungen!		Wilfried von der Neun	Solo voice and piano	1850			
Op. 96, No. 5	Lieder und Gesänge, Vol. IV	Himmel und Erde		Wilfried von der Neun	Solo voice and piano	1850			
Op. 98a, No. 1	Lieder und Gesänge aus 'Wilhelm Meister'	Mignon (Kennst du das Land)		Goethe	Solo voice (Mignon) and piano	1849			Identical to Op. 79, No. 28
Op. 98a, No. 2	Lieder und Gesänge aus 'Wilhelm Meister'	Ballade des Harfners		Goethe	Solo voice (Harfner) and piano	1849			
Op. 98a, No. 3	Lieder und Gesänge aus 'Wilhelm Meister'	Nur wer die Sehnsucht kennt		Goethe	Solo voice (Mignon) and piano	1849			
Op. 98a, No. 4	Lieder und Gesänge aus 'Wilhelm Meister'	Wie nie sein Brot mit Tränen aß		Goethe	Solo voice (Harfner) and piano	1849			
Op. 98a, No. 5	Lieder und Gesänge aus 'Wilhelm Meister'	Heiss' mich nicht reden		Goethe	Solo voice (Mignon) and piano	1849			
Op. 98a, No. 6	Lieder und Gesänge aus 'Wilhelm Meister'	Wer sich der Einsamkeit ergibt		Goethe	Solo voice (Harfner) and piano	1849			
Op. 98a, No. 7	Lieder und Gesänge aus 'Wilhelm Meister'	Singet nicht in Trauertönen		Goethe	Solo voice (Philine) and piano	1849			
Op. 98a, No. 8	Lieder und Gesänge aus 'Wilhelm Meister'	An die Thüren will ich schleichen		Goethe	Solo voice (Harfner) and piano	1849			
Op. 98a, No. 9	Lieder und Gesänge aus 'Wilhelm Meister'	So lasst mich scheinen, bis ich werde		Goethe	Solo voice (Mignon) and piano	1849			
Op. 104, No. 1	7 Lieder	Mond, meiner Seele Liebling		Elisabeth Kulmann	Solo voice and piano	1851			
Op. 104, No. 2	7 Lieder	Viel Glück zur Reise		Elisabeth Kulmann	Solo voice and piano	1851			
Op. 104, No. 3	7 Lieder	Du nennst mich armes Mädchen		Elisabeth Kulmann	Solo voice and piano	1851			
Op. 104, No. 4	7 Lieder	Der Zeisig		Elisabeth Kulmann	Solo voice and piano	1851			
Op. 104, No. 5	7 Lieder	Reich' mir die Hand		Elisabeth Kulmann	Solo voice and piano	1851			
Op. 104, No. 6	7 Lieder	Die letzten Blumen starben		Elisabeth Kulmann	Solo voice and piano	1851			
Op. 104, No. 7	7 Lieder	Gekämpft hat meine Barke		Elisabeth Kulmann	Solo voice and piano	1851			
RSW:Anh:M2,1-11, No. 1	11 Songs	Die Weinende		Byron, trans. Theodor Körner	Solo voice and piano	1827-28			
RSW:Anh:M2,1-11, No. 2	11 Songs	Kurzes Erwachen		Justinus Kerner	Solo voice and piano	1827-28			
RSW:Anh:M2,1-11, No. 3	11 Songs	Gesanges Erwachen		Kerner	Solo voice and piano	1827-28			
RSW:Anh:M2,1-11, No. 4	11 Songs	An Anna I		Kerner	Solo voice and piano	1827-28			
RSW:Anh:M2,1-11, No. 5	11 Songs	Sehnsucht		Schumann himself	Solo voice and piano	1827-28			
RSW:Anh:M2,1-11, No. 6	11 Songs	Der Fischer		Goethe	Solo voice and piano	1827-28			
RSW:Anh:M2,1-11, No. 7	11 Songs	An Anna II		Kerner	Solo voice and piano	1827-28			
RSW:Anh:M2,1-11, No. 8	11 Songs	Im Herbste		Kerner	Solo voice and piano	1827-28			
RSW:Anh:M2,1-11, No. 9	11 Songs	Hirtenknabe		Schumann	Solo voice and piano	1827-28			
RSW:Anh:M2,1-11, No. 10	11 Songs	Erinnerung		Johann Georg Jacobi	Solo voice and piano	1827-28			
RSW:Anh:M2,1-11, No. 11	11 Songs	Klage			Solo voice and piano	1827-28			Lost

== Sources ==
- McCorkle, Margit L. (2003). Robert Schumann: thematisch-bibliographisches Werkverzeichnis. Munich: G. Henle Verlag. ISBN 9783873281103.
- Hoffman; Keil (1982). Robert Schumann: thematisches Verzeichnis sämtlicher im Druck erschienenen musikalischen Werke mit Angabe des Jahres ihres Entstehens und Erscheinens, 5th ed. Schuberth. ISBN 9783922074021.
