= Christopher Maltman =

British operatic baritone (born 1970)

- Born: 6 February 1970 (age 55); Cleethorpes, England
- Education: Royal Academy of Music
- Occupation: Baritone
- Organization: The Royal Opera

Christopher Maltman (born 6 February 1970) is a British operatic baritone who has appeared internationally. He has sung many leading roles first at the Royal Opera House, the title role of Enescu's Œdipe at the Salzburg Festival, and Jochanaan in Salome by Richard Strauss at the Oper Frankfurt. He made many recordings of song repertoire.

== Life and career ==
Maltman was born in Cleethorpes, and was educated at Warwick University where he received a degree in Biochemistry. He subsequently studied music at the Royal Academy of Music and trained at British Youth Opera. In 1997 he received the Lieder Prize at the BBC Cardiff Singer of the World Competition. He made his debut with The Royal Opera in 1997 and has since sung over fifteen principal roles there including Don Carlo di Vargas in Verdi's La forza del destino, Conte di Luna in Il trovatore, Enrico in Donizetti's Lucia di Lammermoor, Papageno in Mozart's Die Zauberflöte, Count Almaviva in Le nozze di Figaro, Guglielmo in Così fan tutte, the Forester in Janacek's The Cunning Little Vixen, and Lescaut in Puccini's Manon Lescaut. He has entered an international career in the great opera houses of Europe and North America specialising in Italian dramatic baritone repertoire, especially the role of Verdi's Rigoletto, but also Rodrigo in Don Carlo, the title role of Simon Boccanegra, Ford in Falstaff, and Guy de Montfort in Les Vêpres siciliennes.

Maltman appeared at the Salzburg Festival in the title role of Enescu's Œdipe in 2019. In 2020, he performed first the role of Jochanaan in Salome by Richard Strauss, at the Oper Frankfurt, directed by Barrie Kosky and conducted by Joana Mallwitz, alongside Ambur Braid in the title role. A reviewer noted his firm but lyrical voice.

He married Audrey Saint-Gil, a French conductor and pianist, in 2021.

== Recordings ==
Maltman recorded Vaughan Williams's Serenade to Music, and participated in a project to record all of Beethoven Folk Songs. He recorded Schumann's Dichterliebe and Liederkreis, Op. 24, with pianist Graham Johnson, a Debussy album with pianist Malcolm Martineau, and English songs with Roger Vignoles. He appeared in a film of John Adams' The Death of Klinghoffer.

Maltman has taken part in several broadcast performances later issued on video, and appeared as Mozart's Don Giovanni in the 2009 Kasper Holten film Juan.

In 2023, he records Berlioz's Roméo et Juliette with Joyce DiDonato, Cyrille Dubois, le Choeur de l'OnR, l'Orchestre philarmonique de Strasbourg, conducted by John Nelson. 2 CD Warner classics 2023. Choc de Classica
