= Liederkreis =

Liederkreis means song cycle in German, and may refer to:

- Liederkreis an die ferne Geliebte (To the distant beloved), Op. 98, a song cycle by Ludwig van Beethoven written in April 1816
- Liederkreis Op. 24, a song cycle by Robert Schumann
- Liederkreis Op. 39, a song cycle by Robert Schumann
- Liederkreis, a series of paintings in two cycles based on Schumann's Op.39 by Sebastian Spreng
