= Frauen-Liebe und Leben =

Cycle of poems by Adelbert von Chamisso

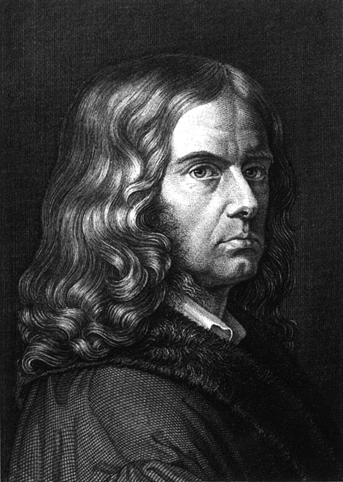
Adalbert von Chamisso in 1831

Frauen-Liebe und Leben (Woman's Love and Life) is a cycle of poems by Adelbert von Chamisso, written in late 1829 and early 1830. They describe the course of a woman's love for a man, from their first meeting to her widowhood. The poems were widely popular and set to music by many composers, including Carl Loewe and Franz Lachner. Robert Schumann's song cycle on the text is the most widely known.

== Text ==
Adelbert von Chamisso wrote the cycle of nine poems in late 1829 and early 1830. It was first published in Franz Kugler's Skizzenbuch (Sketchbook, 1830) as "Frauen Liebe und Leben". They were part of a "Musical Appendix" where Kugler set Chamisso's words to music. Kugler socialized with Chamisso and dedicated the Skizzenbuch to him. Amadeus Wendt soon included the poems as "Frauen-Liebe und Leben" in his Musenalmanach (Muses' Almanac), which was published in 1830 for the following year.

In 1831, the poems were published twice in the first editions of Chamisso's poetry and his complete works. The cycle was widely admired in Germany, particularly by young women.

The nine poems in the cycle are untitled.

1. "Seit ich ihn gesehen" [Since I first saw him]: The woman is blinded by her love for the man she has met.
2. "Er, der herrlichste von allen" [He, the most marvelous of all]: She believes only the worthiest woman will capture his love.
3. "Ich kann's nicht fassen, nicht glauben" [I cannot grasp it, nor believe it]: She is astounded the man would choose a woman as lowly as her.
4. "Du Ring an meinem Finger" [Thou ring upon my finger]: She is transfigured by his love and vows to serve him.
5. "Helft mir, ihr Schwestern" [Help me, you sisters]: She asks other women to help her prepare for her marriage and laments leaving their company.
6. "Süßer Freund, du blickest" [Sweet friend, you look]: She blissfully tells her husband that she is pregnant.
7. "An meinem Herzen, an meiner Brust" [Against my heart, against my breast]: The new mother relishes nursing her child.
8. "Nun hast du mir den ersten Schmerz getan" [Now you have caused me the first grief]: She laments the death of her husband.
9. "Traum der eignen Tage" [Dream of my own days]: She blesses her granddaughter.

Chamisso classified the cycle as lyric narrative poems. His decision to write from the woman's perspective was also in the German tradition of role-playing poems (Rollengedichte). The poet's wife, Antonie, was nineteen years younger than him and the foster daughter of his friend Eduard Hitzig. She is supposedly the model for the woman in Chamisso's cycle.

The heroine's subservience and naivety have been summed up as "an elegant view of how the more authoritarian paterfamilias hoped to be regarded by his wife, and particularly how he assumed she would greet his death". She has also been dismissed as "a doormat". Chamisso filled a gap in contemporary poetry by writing from a woman's perspective. Likewise, the songs composed to his poems gave female singers a rare opportunity to sing first-person material.

== Adaptations ==
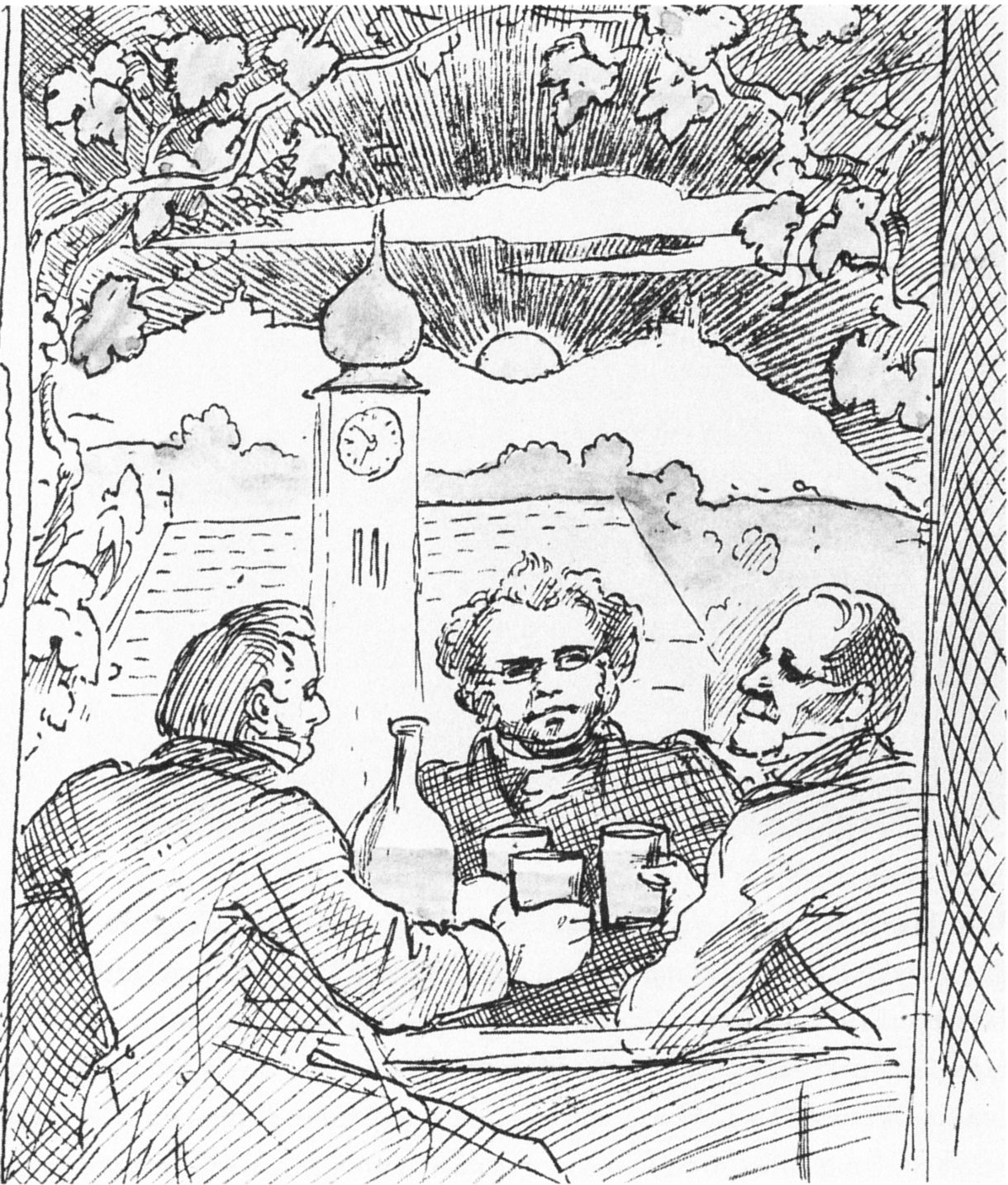
(from left) Franz Lachner, Schubert, and Eduard von Bauernfeld at a heuriger in Grinzing

Frauen-Liebe und Leben's first appearance in print were as lyrics for Franz Kugler's songs. Dozens of the cycle's poems were individually set to music by other composers. Chamisso was a botanist by trade, and he was stunned by the fondness composers had for his verse. In 1832, he wrote to a friend, "People sing my songs, they are sung in the salons, composers scramble for them, children recite them in school, my portrait appears after Goethe, Tieck and Schlegel as the fourth in the row of contemporary German poets."

In September 1836, Carl Loewe set the poems as Frauenliebe, Op. 60, for mezzo-soprano and piano. Only the first seven were published together during his life. The ninth song was published in 1869. In 1904, Breitkopf & Härtel published the eighth song for the first time in a complete edition of Loewe's works.

Around 1839, Franz Lachner composed Frauenliebe und -leben, Op. 59, for soprano, horn or cello, and piano. He returned to the text in 1847 and created an arrangement for soprano, clarinet, and piano.

=== Robert Schumann ===
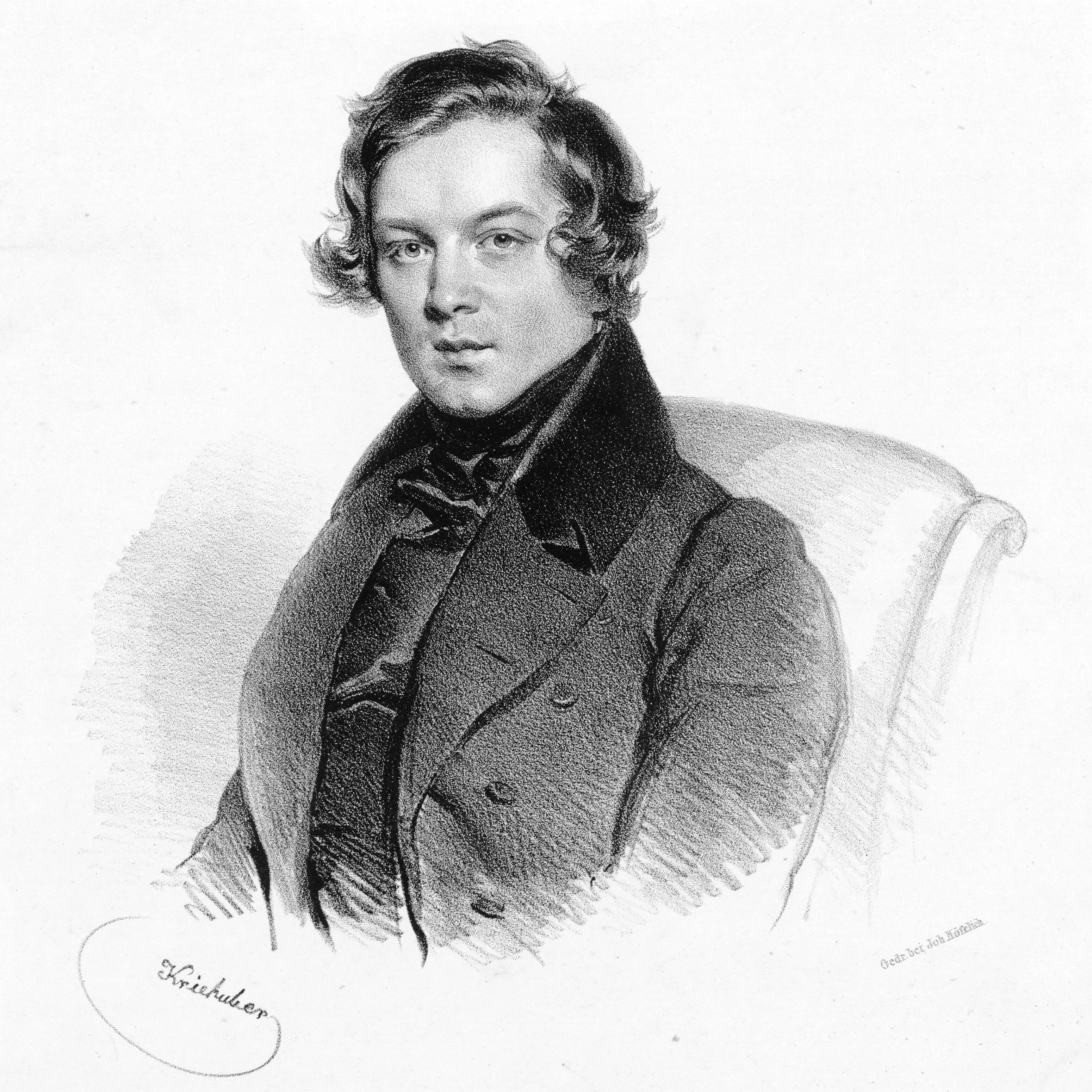
Robert Schumann in 1839; lithograph by Josef Kriehuber

1. "Seit ich ihn gesehen"

4. "Du Ring an meinem Finger"
Callista Huffman, mezzo soprano; Giorgi Latso, piano

Robert Schumann set Chamisso's poems on July 11 and 12, 1840. His manuscripts are still extant. They mostly outline the voice part on single staves, with just a few bars of piano postlude at the very end of No. 8. He dedicated the cycle to Oswald Lorenz.

1840 was Schumann's "year of song" in which he wrote numerous lieder and several song cycles: Liederkreis, Op. 24, Liederkreis, Op. 39, Frauen-Liebe und Leben, Op. 42, and Dichterliebe, Op. 48.

Chamisso's text mirrored Schumann's personal life at the time. He had been courting Clara Wieck, but her father refused permission for the marriage. Schumann compared Clara's father to a character in Chamisso's poetry. Clara sued her father in order to marry without his permission. She won the case, and five days after that Schumann drafted Frauenliebe und Leben.

The composer's major editorial decision was to jettison the ninth poem in the cycle. He made several minor changes to the source material, reversing lines and changing words. In both the second and third songs, Schumann repeats the first stanza as a coda. In the sixth song, he omits the third stanza.

1. "Seit ich ihn gesehen": Larghetto in B♭ major.
2. "Er, der Herrlichste von allen": Innig, lebhaft [Intimate, lively] in E♭ major.
3. "Ich kann's nicht fassen, nicht glauben": Mit leidenschaft [With passion] in C minor.
4. "Du Ring an meinem Finger": Innig in E♭ major.
5. "Helft mir, ihr Schwestern": Ziemlich schnell [Rather fast] in B♭ major.
6. "Süßer Freund, du blickest mich verwundert an": Langsam, mit innigem Ausdruck [Slowly, with heartfelt passion] in G major.
7. "An meinem Herzen, an meiner Brust": Fröhlich, innig [Happy, heartfelt] in D major.
8. "Nun hast du mir den ersten Schmerz getan": Adagio in D minor with a postlude in B♭ major.

The postlude returns to the initial key and reprises material from the first song. The quotation emphasizes the cyclicality of the material. The device yielded frequent comparisons to Ludwig van Beethoven's 1816 song cycle An die ferne Geliebte.

The prevalence of the word "innig" (intimate/inner) in the tempo markings is typical for the composer's songs. Schumann illustrates the narrator's simplicity with clean vocal lines and an almost spare piano part. The accompaniment is so frequently chordal that the cycle is hymnlike. Instead of elevating Chamisso's mediocre verse, Schumann seemed to succumb to it. Nonetheless, the cycle has been called Schumann's "greatest achievement in song".

Clara Schumann frequently performed the piano part in the cycle. When she heard Wilhelmine Schröder-Devrient perform the cycle in 1848, she concluded, "I cannot imagine 'Du Ring an meinem Finger' more beautifully sung". The German baritone Julius Stockhausen added the cycle to his repertoire in 1862. He also taught it to his students.

== Discography ==
Schumann

- Julia Culp and Otto Bake, Frauenliebe und -Leben (Odeon Records, 1910) – Reissued (His Master's Voice, 1983).
- Lotte Lehmann, Frauenliebe und -Leben (Parlophone-Odeon, 1928) – Chamber orchestra, conducted from the piano by Frieder Weissmann.
- Germaine Martinelli and Jean Doyen, L'Amour et la vie d'une femme (Columbia Records, 1935).
- Emmy Bettendorf (Parlophone) – Omits songs 5 and 7.
- Lotte Lehmann and Bruno Walter, Schumann: Frauenliebe und Leben, Op. 42 / Dichterliebe, Op. 48 (Columbia Odyssey, 1951).
- Elena Gerhardt and Gerald Moore, (His Master's Voice, 1947–1948) – three 12-inch 78 rpm privately published on White Label.
- Astra Desmond and Phyllis Spurr, (Decca, 1947).
- Elisabeth Schumann, An Elisabeth Schumann Program (His Master's Voice, 1953) – With Gerald Moore.
- Kathleen Ferrier and John Newmark, Schumann: Frauenliebe Und Leben, Opus 42 / Brahms: Vier Ernste Gesänge, Opus 121 (Decca, 1953).
- Kathleen Ferrier and Bruno Walter, Schubert - Schumann - Brahms (Decca, 1975) – Live recording from the BBC broadcast at the 1949 Edinburgh Festival.
- Christa Ludwig and Gerald Moore, Brahms and Schumann Lieder (Columbia, 1960).
- Kirsten Flagstad, A Song Recital (His Master's Voice, 1955) – With Edwin McArthur.
- Erna Berger, Frauenliebe Und Leben And A Group Of Songs By Mendelssohn (His Master's Voice, 1958) – With Ernst-Günther Scherzer.
- Irmgard Seefried, Irmgard Seefried Singt (Concert Hall) – With Walter Klien.
- Leontyne Price, Sings Robert Schumann (RCA 1971) – With David Garvey.
- Edith Mathis, Frauenliebe Und Leben / Lied Der Suleika ∙ Liebeslied ∙ Mond, Meiner Seele Liebling ∙ U.A., (Deutsche Grammophon, 1981) – With Christoph Eschenbach.
- Janet Baker, Schumann, Schubert and Brahms (Saga, 1994) – With Martin Isepp.
- Janet Baker, Frauenliebe Und Leben / Liederkreis (EMI, 1976) – With Daniel Barenboim
- Brigitte Fassbaender, Frauenliebe Und Leben Op. 42 • Liederkreis Op. 24 • Tragödie I-III • 3 Lieder (Deutsche Grammophon, 1985) – With Irwin Gage.
- Anne Sofie von Otter and Bengt Forsberg, Schumann: Frauenliebe Und Leben ‧ 5 Lieder Op.40 ‧ 15 Lieder (Deutsche Grammophon, 1995).
- Sarah Connolly, Schumann: Songs of Love & Loss (Chandos, 2008) – With Eugene Asti.
- Elīna Garanča and Malcolm Martineau, Lieder (Deutsche Grammophon, 2020).

Loewe

- Brigitte Fassbaender and Cord Garben, Carl Loewe: Lieder - Frauenliebe (Deutsche Grammophon, 1988)
- Karin Ott and Jean Lemaire, Carl Loewe: Frauen-Liebe Und Leben, Balladen (Ex Libris, 1988)

Lachner

- Evelyn Tubb, Lesley Schatzberger, Richard Burnett, The Journey of Love Through Life: Lieder by Schumann, Schubert, Spohr, Lachner (Serendipity, 1996).
- Aríon Trio, Schubert & Co. (Antes Edition, 1998).
