= Sechs Gedichte und Requiem =

Song cycle by Robert Schumann

- by Robert Schumann
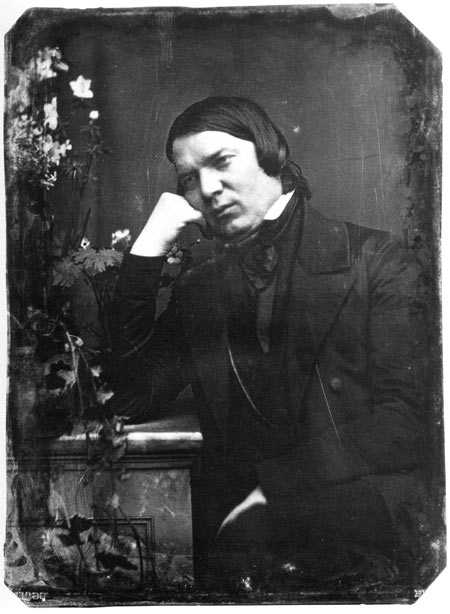
- Robert Schumann in an 1850 daguerreotype
- Opus: 90
- Period: Romantic period
- Genre: Song cycle
- Composed: 1850
- Scoring: Voice and piano

Sechs Gedichte und Requiem, Op. 90, (English: Six Poems and Requiem) also called the Lenau-Lieder, is a song cycle by Robert Schumann. It was composed in 1850, shortly before the Schumanns moved to Düsseldorf.

The cycle consists of seven songs. The first six are settings of poems by Nikolaus Lenau. The final song, "Requiem", is a setting of a translation by Lebrecht Blücher Dreves of an anonymous mediaeval poem in Latin.

== Composition ==
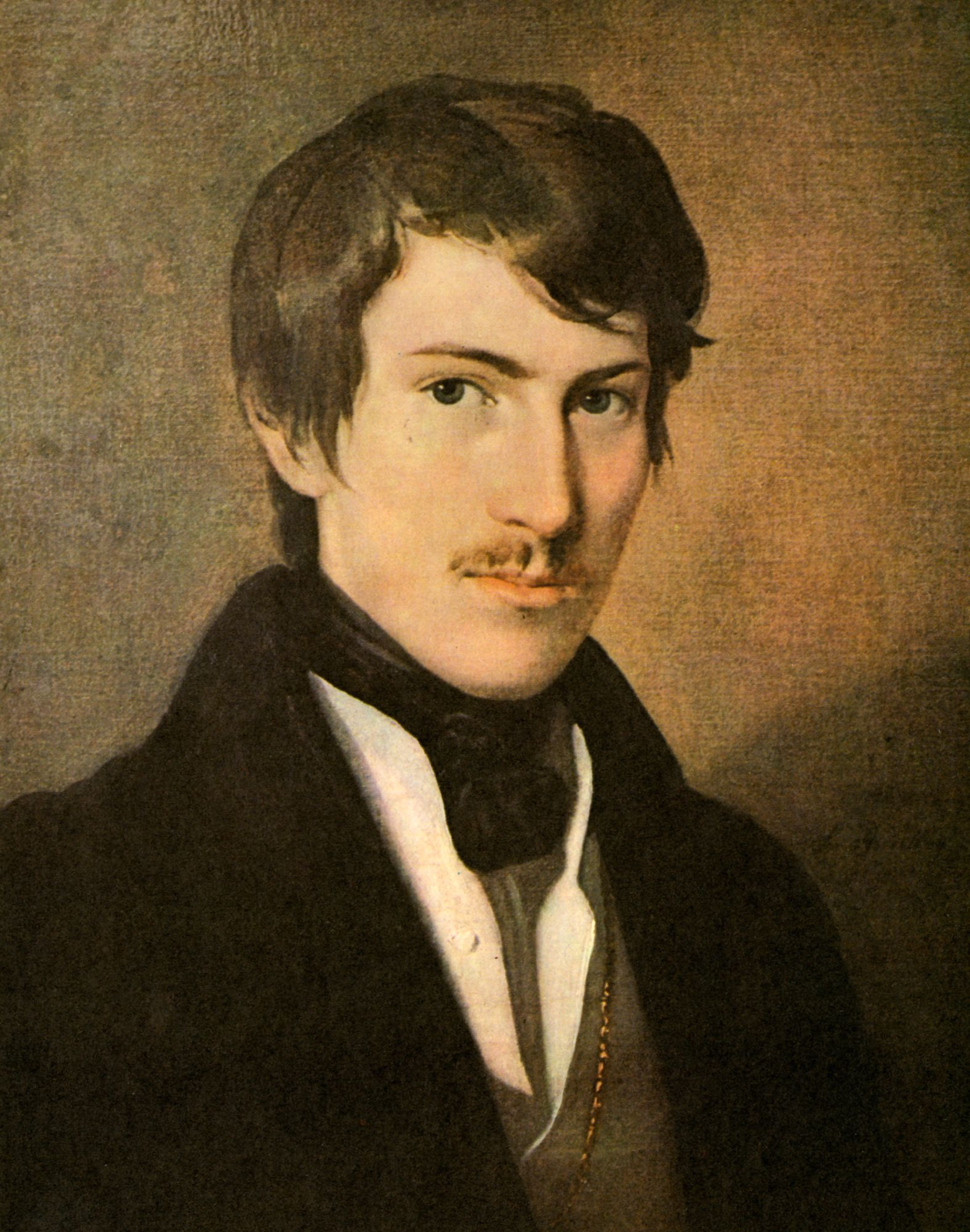
Nikolaus Lenau in a portrait by Friedrich von Amerling

In 1829 Schumann had met the cycle's main librettist, Nikolaus Lenau, in Vienna. But it was in the summer of 1850 that he undertook to set his poems in a cycle. This came at the end of his period in Dresden, where the Schumanns' lives had lately been upturned by the violence of 1849.

For Schumann, 1850 followed an extremely productive year which saw the composition of piano music such as the Waldszenen; works for solo voice such as the Spanisches Liederspiel and the declamation Schön Hedwig; two concertante works, the Konzertstück for Four Horns and Orchestra and the Introduction and Allegro appassionato for Piano and Orchestra; chamber works such as the Five Pieces in Folk Style and the Adagio and Allegro for Horn and Piano; and many choral and part-song works, such as the Requiem for Mignon, the Nachtlied for chorus and orchestra and the song cycle Minnespiel.

The beginning of 1850 saw sketches for Schumann's Neujahrslied, Op. 144, and several successful productions of the popular Paradise and the Peri. In February, Clara Schumann and her husband travelled from Dresden to Leipzig, to prepare for the premiere of Robert's opera Genoveva. However, Genoveva's staging was delayed in favour of a production of Meyerbeer's Le prophète, whose premiere at Paris the previous year had been met very warmly. Nevertheless, the Schumanns stayed a month in Leipzig, where performances of Schumann's works were received well, returning at last to Dresden via concerts in the north-west and a visit to relatives of Clara's in Berlin.

It was at this time that Schumann accepted the post of musical director in Düsseldorf. Upon his return home, Schumann became extremely productive in vocal music, working on his Scenes from Goethe's Faust and completing many songs. In the summer, the Schumanns returned to Leipzig for the actual premiere of Genoveva. The opera was received poorly, and received only three performances.

Disappointed, Schumann returned to Dresden in July. That month he worked on several vocal works, including the Sechs Gedichte, which was supposed to be tribute to Lenau. At the time of the completion of the cycle on 5 August, Schumann believed Lenau dead. Lenau was syphilitic, as some have conjectured was Schumann, and like Schumann again he struggled his entire life long with mental illness and died in an asylum. In fact Schumann was mistaken, and Lenau would not eventually die until 22 August, by coincidence the day of the Sechs Gedichte's premiere.

To six of Lenau's poems Schumann appended the "Requiem": a text which he described as an "old Catholic poem". It is not a requiem at all, but an anonymous lament supposed by tradition to be Héloïse's upon the death of Abélard.

== Songs ==
The songs are:

1. "Lied eines Schmiedes" (Song of a Blacksmith)
2. "Meine Rose" (My Rose)
3. "Kommen und Scheiden" (Arriving and Departing)
4. "Die Sennin" (The Alpine Shepherdess)
5. "Einsamkeit" (Solitude)
6. "Der schwere Abend" (The Oppressive Evening)
7. "Requiem"

The songs' texts concern lost love. John Daverio writes that in the course of the cycle "the poet's grief steadily intensifies", so that the poems "unfold a kind of Künstlerleben or 'Artist's life' that makes the cycle into a pendant to Dichterliebe".

== Reception ==
This cycle was one of few works not by a French composer which Francis Poulenc and Pierre Bernac performed in a series of concerts given during World War II.
