= Germaine Martinelli =

French opera singer

Germaine Martinelli, née Germaine Jeanne Jobert, (30 September 1887 in the 9th arrondissement of Paris – 8 April 1964 at her home in the 1st arrondissement of Paris), was a 20th-century French opera singer.

== Biography ==
Daughter of Doctor Jobert, settled in Montmartre, doctor of the Moulin-Rouge, she studied literature without going through the Conservatory and had as teachers the baritone Jean Lassalle, creator of Saint-Saens's Henry VIII and Massenet's Le roi de Lahore and Albert Petit, adherent to the García method (father of la Malibran).

She began as a mezzo-soprano before becoming dramatic soprano. In 1908, she married Charles Martinet, singer and actor under the name of Charles Martinelli, creator of Massenet's Panurge and who performed Boubouroche by Courteline, with whom she had a son, the actor Jean Martinelli (1909–1983).

She withdrew from the stage in 1941 and became a teacher at the Fontainebleau Schools along Nadia Boulanger.

A special prize from the Académie nationale du disque lyrique, dedicated to melody, bears her name.

She had been made chevalier of the Légion d'honneur in 1938.

== Roles ==
Her greatest role remains Marguerite in Berlioz's La damnation de Faust (she only sang in French both the German lieder by Schubert, Die schöne Müllerin and Schumann's Frauen-Liebe und Leben).

She has left many recordings.

After she died in Paris, she was buried at the Père Lachaise Cemetery (16th division).

== Publication ==
- L'Art du chant, Durassié, 1929
