= Kasper Holten =

Danish stage director

Kasper Holten (born 29 March 1973) is a Danish stage director. From 2011 until 2017 he was Director of Opera for the Royal Opera House in London. He is Vice President of the Board of the European Academy of Music Theatre.

== Career ==
Born in Copenhagen, Holten began his career in opera as a director's assistant to such figures as Harry Kupfer, John Cox and David Pountney. In 2000, at age 27, Holten became artistic director of the Royal Danish Opera. His work there included a highly acclaimed production of Der Ring des Nibelungen, which was released on DVD as "The Copenhagen Ring". This DVD won the Gramophone Award in 2009 for Best DVD. He held this post until 2011.

In March 2011, Holten was named the new Director of Opera at the Royal Opera House, Covent Garden, and formally assumed the post in the autumn of 2011 with an initial contract of 5 years. His directorial debut at Covent Garden was in February 2013. In December 2015, the company announced the scheduled departure of Holten as Director of Opera in March 2017, to return with his family to Denmark, after declining an offer of a 5-year extension to his contract.

Holten is the director and writer (alongside Mogens Rukov) of Juan, a movie based on Mozart's Don Giovanni, shot in 2009 and starring Christopher Maltman and Mikhail Petrenko.

== Personal life ==
He and his partner have two children.
