= Wilhelm Gerhard =

German merchant, playwright and poet (1780–1858)

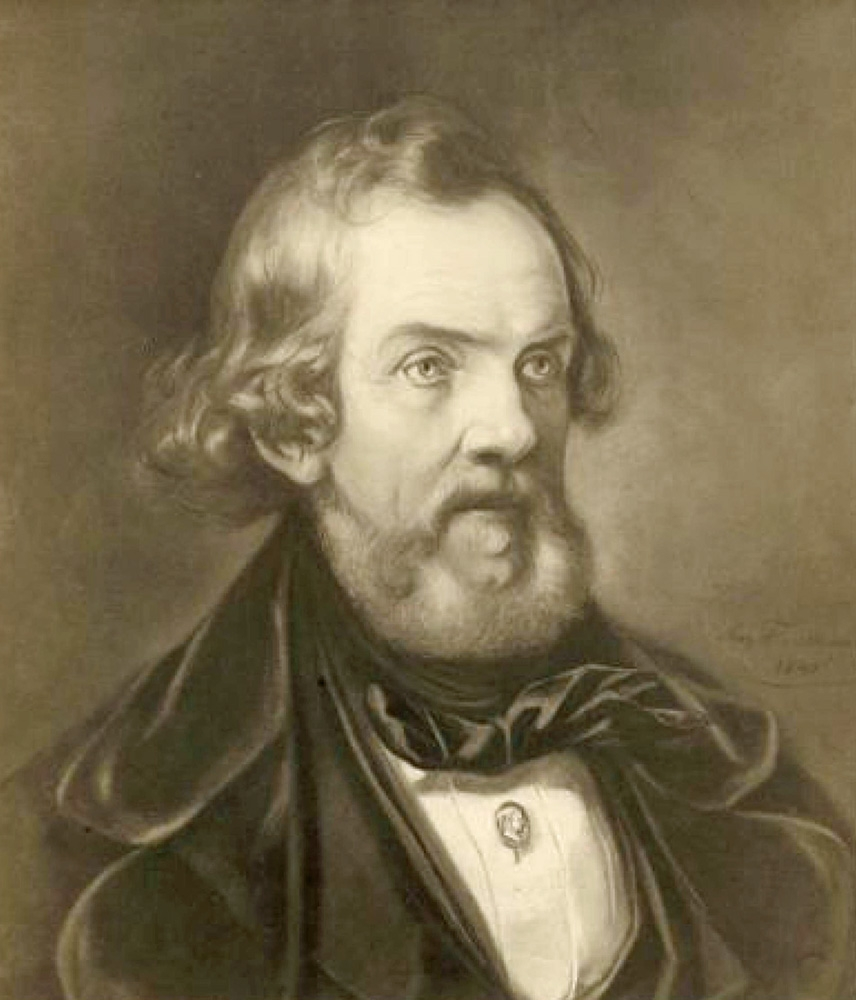
Wilhelm Gerhard noframe

Christoph Wilhelm Leonhard Gerhard (b. 29 November 1780 at Weimar; d. 2 October 1858 at Heidelberg) was a German merchant, playwright and poet.

== Life ==
Gerhard was a merchant's son. He completed a four-year-long apprenticeship as a merchant's assistant at Zittau and then went to work at a firm in Leipzig; in 1805 he became a citizen there. With a business partner he founded a firm dealing fabrics and millinery supplies.

In 1807 the writer Siegfried August Mahlmann brought him to the Masonic lodge in Leipzig, Minerva zu den Drei Palmen, where he became a member; his career as a poet was initiated with the composition of several Masonic chants. In some time he had given up his business and devoted himself to writing poems, as well as plays and dramatic adaptations of other poets' work. He was the dramaturge of the Leipziger Stadttheater. He also translated material from English and other languages.

In 1827 he purchased a house with expansive gardens in Leipzig; the gardens he redesigned in the English style and were known afterwards as "Gerhards Garten". At his new home he received important intellectuals and personalities of the 19th century, including Ludwig Tieck, Friedrich Rückert, Heinrich Marschner, Albert Lortzing and Felix Mendelssohn Bartholdy. Well-known artists such as Bertel Thorvaldsen and Johan Christian Clausen Dahl also visited. He was a friend of Goethe's. Gerhard grew to be an important patron of intellectual activity at Leipzig. In 1853 he had an open-air theatre erected in his garden.

Besides his literary career he was also an enthusiast of mineralogy and botany. Gerhard distributed the exsiccata-like duplicate specimen series Plantae exsiccatae.

He was married to Caroline, née Richter (1797–1879).

In 1832 he was appointed to the Duchy of Sachsen-Meiningenschen Legationrat. He died at Heidelberg while returning from Switzerland.

== Selection of works ==
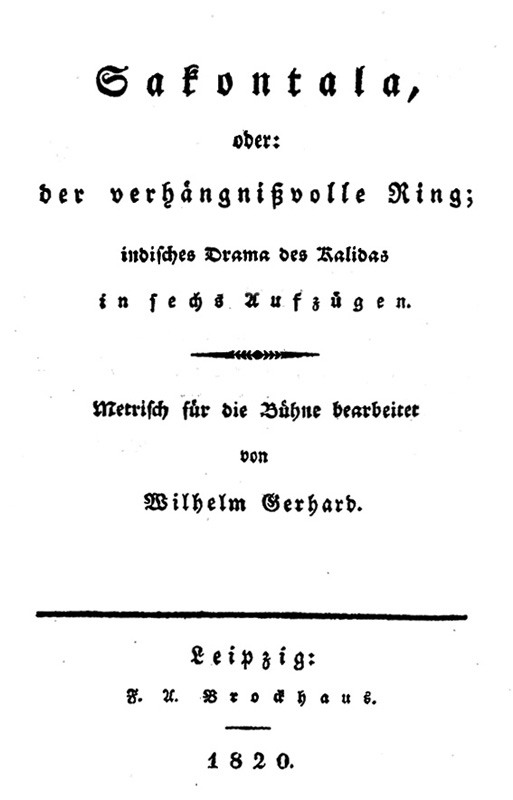
Title page of Sakontala

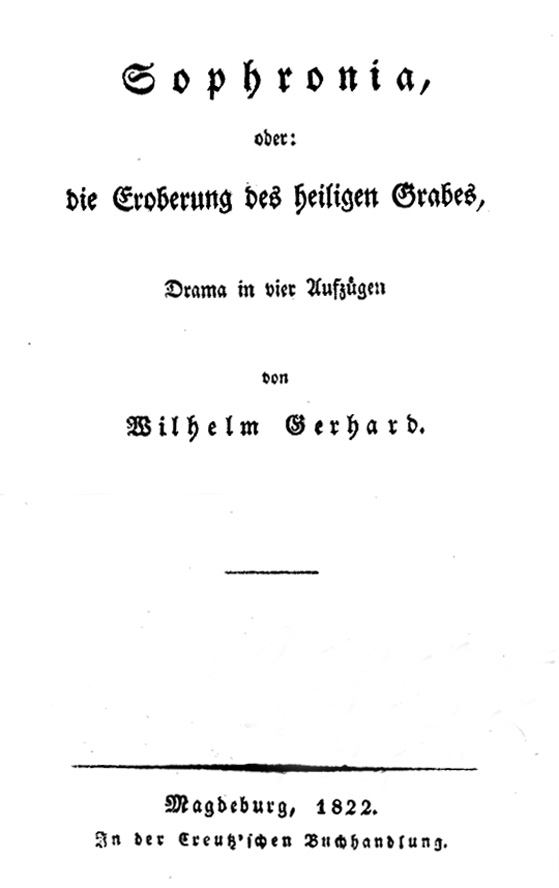
Title page of Sophronia

- Das Maurerlicht und der flammende Stern, 1812
- Maskenkalender auf das Jahr 1817, 1817
- Anakreon und Sappho, free translation in German song, 1818
- Sakontala oder Der verhängnisvolle Ring, Indian Drama for the stage, 1820
- Sophronia oder Die Eroberung des heiligen Grabes, Drama, 1822
- Spaziergang über die Alpen, 1824
- Gedichte, 4 volumes, 1826–1828
- Wiegenweihe, festival play, 1828
- Blick auf einige Steuerverhältnisse im Königreich Sachsen, 1831
- Der Jahrmarkt zu Borgo di Trastullo, festival play, 1835
- Prologus, der Narrenfresser und Narrenauszug, Masque for the benefit and amusement of all carnival fools, given on 18 February 1840 by the company Concordia
- Frühlings Erwachen, Festival scene with song and dance, 1846
- Numerous translations

== Legacy ==
- Since 1897, Gerhardstraße in the Plagwitz locality of Leipzig has been named after him.
