= Elisabeth Kulmann =

Russian-born poet and translator (1808-1825)

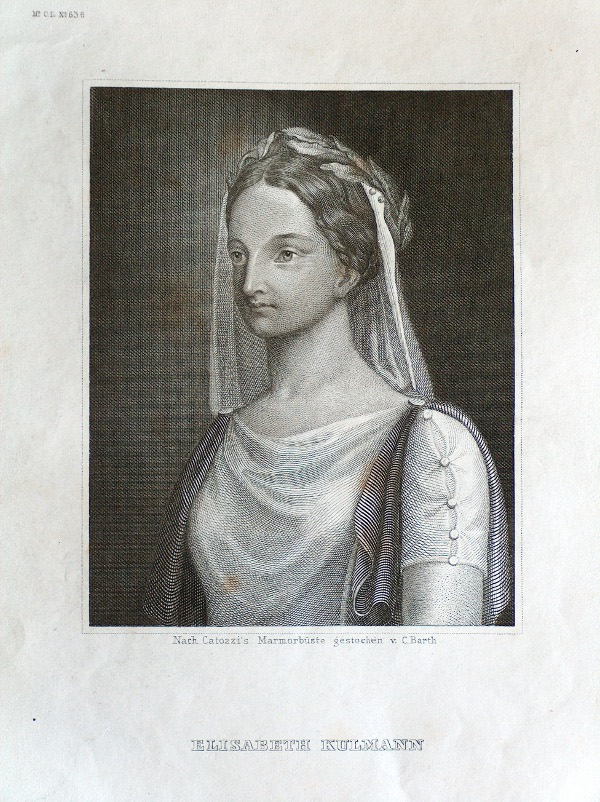
Portrait of Elisabeth Kulmann, after a bust by Paolo Catozzi

Elisabeth Kulmann (Russian: Елисавета Борисовна Кульман/Jelissaweta Borissowna Kulman; July 17 [O.S. 7] 1808 – December 1 [O.S. November 25] 1825) was a Russian-born poet and translator who worked in Russian, German and Italian.

== Biography ==
Kulmann was born in the Russian Empire, one of the several children of Boris Fedorovich, and Mary (née Rosenberg) Kulmann. Her father, a collegiate councilor and a retired captain, died early. The family lived on Vasilyevsky Island in St. Petersburg.

As a child, Kulman showed phenomenal philological abilities, learning ancient and modern languages under the direction of Karl Grosgeynrikh. She achieved fluency in 11 languages.

Kulman wrote over 1,000 poems before her death at age 17. Robert Schumann considered her a wunderkind and set some of her poems to music including "Mailied" ["May Song"] and "An den Abendstern" ["To the Evening Star"].

Kulman was buried in the Smolensky Cemetery in St. Petersburg, in a tomb bearing a carving by Alexander Triscorni - a marble sculpture of a girl on a bed of roses. The monument bears inscriptions in several languages, including Latin: Prima Russicarum operam dedit idiomati graeco, undecim novit linguas, loquebatur octo, quamquam puella poetria eminens (The first Russian young girl, who knew the Greek language, and learned eleven languages, spoken in eight, and was an excellent poet).

In the 1930s, the Soviet authorities moved Kulman's remains to the Tikhvin Cemetery in the Alexander Nevsky monastery.

== Selected works ==
- Kulmann Elisabeth. Sämmtliche Gedichte — S.-Pb., 1835. — 200 S.
- Kulmann E. Saggi poetici. — S.-Pietroburgo, 1839. — XXIII, 191 S.
- Kulmann Elisabeth. Sämmtliche Gedichte — Leipzig, 1844. — 132; 288 S.
- Kulmann E. Saggi Poetici di Elisabetta Kulmann. — Milano, 1845, 1846, 1847.
- Kulmann Elisabeth. Sämmtliche Dichtungen — Frankfurt am Main, 1851. — CXXXIII, 670 S.; 1857. — CXXVIII, 724 S.
- Kulmann E. Dichtungen. Ausgewahlt und mit einer Einleitung versehen von Franz Miltner. — Heidelberg, 1875. — XXII, 145 S.
- Kulmann E. Mond, meiner Seele Liebling: e.Ausw. ihrer Gedichte. — Heidelberg, 1981.

== Musical works in Kulmann verses ==
- Schumann R. Mädchenlieder von Elisabeth Kulmann für 2 Sopran-St. jder Sopran u. Alt mit Begleitung des Pianoforte. Op. 103. — Leipzig: Fr. Kistner, [1851]. — 11 S.
- Schumann R. Sieben Lieder von Elisabeth Kulmann zur Erinnerung an die Dichterin für eine Singstimme mit Begleitung des Pianoforte componirt von Rob. Schumann. Op.104. — Leipzig: Fr. Kistner, [1851]. — 18 S.
