= Abraham Emanuel Fröhlich =

Swiss poet (1796–1865)

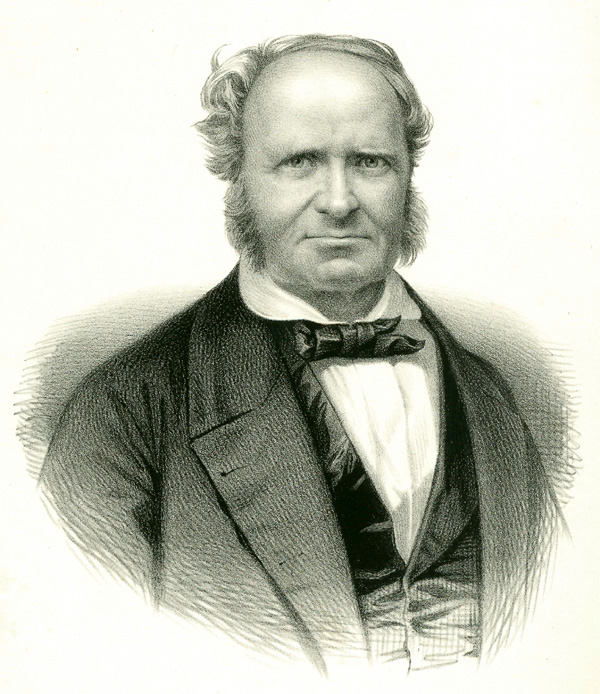
Abraham Emanuel Fröhlich

Abraham Emanuel Fröhlich (1 February 1796, Brugg, Aargau – 1 December 1865) was a Swiss poet.

== Biography ==
He was born in Brugg in the canton of Aargau, where his father was a teacher. After studying theology at Zurich he became a pastor in 1817 and returned as teacher to his native town, where he lived for ten years. He was then appointed professor of German language and literature in the cantonal school in Aargau. However, he lost the post in the political quarrels of 1830. He afterwards obtained the post of teacher and rector of the cantonal college, and was also appointed assistant minister at the parish church. He died in Baden, Aargau.

Fröhlich is best known for his two heroic poems, Ulrich Zwingli and Ulrich von Hutten, and especially for his fables, which have been ranked with those of Hagedorn, Lessing and Gellert.

== Works ==
An edition of his collected works, in 5 vols., was published at Frauenfeld in 1853. His main works include:

- 170 Fabeln (1825)
- Schweizer Lieder (1827)
- Des Evangelium St. Johannis, in Liedern (1830)
- Elegien an Wieg und Sarg (1835)
- Die Epopöen (1840)
- Ulrich Zwingli (1840)
- Ulrich von Hutten (1845)
- Auserlesene Psalmen und geistliche Lieder für die Evangelisch-reformirte Kirche des Cantons Aargau (1844)
- Über den Kirchengesang der Protestanten (1846)
- Trostlieder (1852)
- Der Junge Deutsch-Michel (1846)
- Reimsprüche aus Staat, Schule, und Kirche (1820)
