= Karl Ludwig Kannegiesser =

Karl Friedrich Ludwig Kannegiesser (1781–1861) was a German writer, translator, and critic.

== Biography ==
He was born at Wendemark, and was educated at Halle.

== Work ==
He translated Beaumont and Fletcher (1808), the Divina Commedia (5th ed. 1873), Dante's lyrics (2nd ed. 1842), and many others, ranging from Horace's Odes, Anacreon, and Sappho to Chaucer, Byron, and Scott. He was also famed as an exegete of Goethe, and edited with valuable notes a selection from that author's lyrical verse (1835).
