= Liederkreis, Op. 24 (Schumann) =

Song cycle

Liederkreis
- Song cycle by Robert Schumann
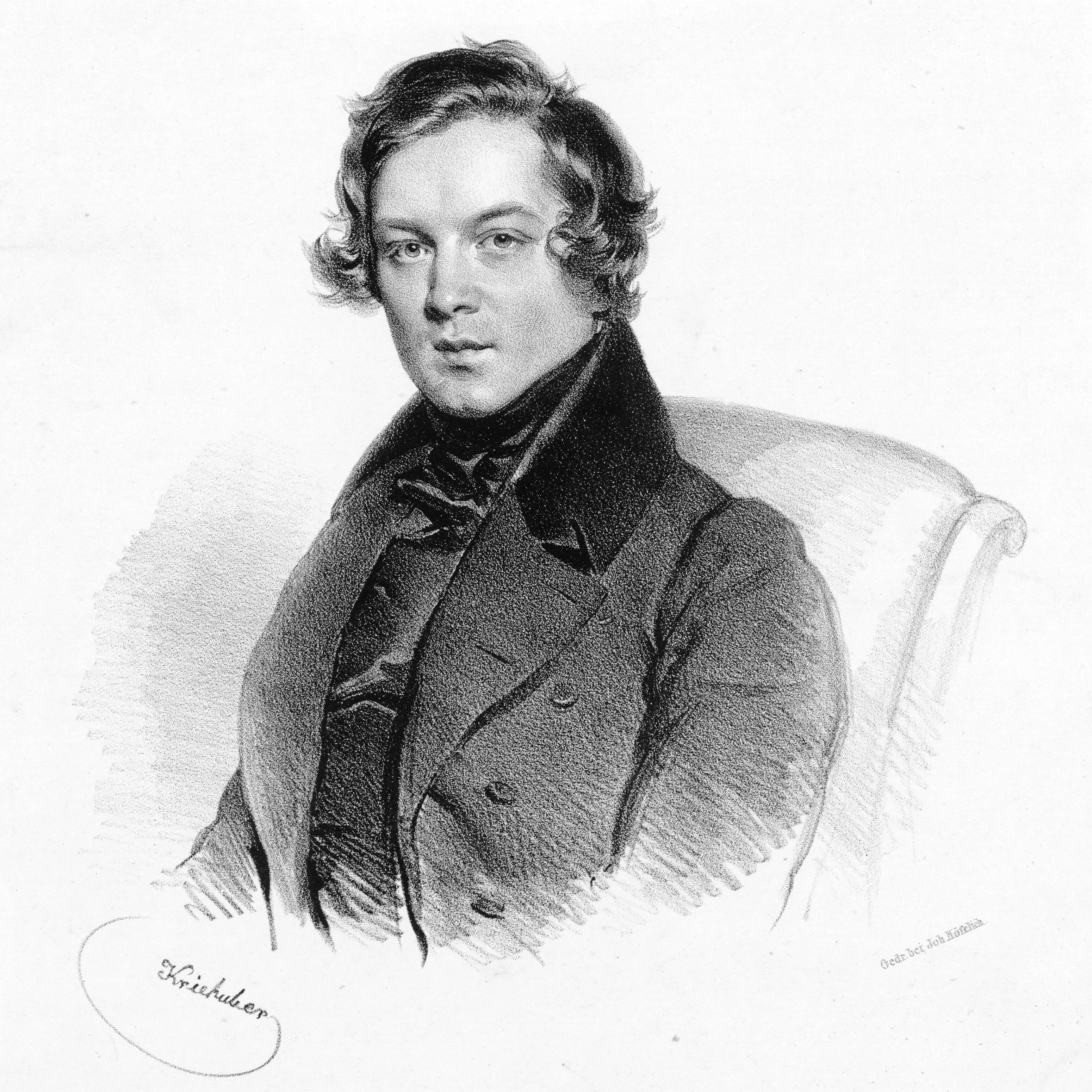
- Robert Schumann in 1939
- English: Round of Songs
- Opus: 24
- Text: poems by Heinrich Heine
- Language: German
- Composed: 1840
- Published: 1840
- Movements: nine
- Scoring: voice; piano

Liederkreis, Op. 24, is a song cycle for voice and piano composed by Robert Schumann on nine poems by Heinrich Heine. The cycle was composed and published in 1840 and dedicated to Pauline Garcia.

This song cycle was one of the earlier products of Schumann’s Liederjahr (Year of Song), referring to his nearly exclusive devotion to song composition from 1840-1841, immediately after his marriage to Clara Wieck. A letter from Schumann to his wife likely places the date of composition in February. This places the cycle shortly before other well-known song cycles and collections such as Myrthen, Liederkreis, Op.39, Frauenliebe und -leben and Dichterliebe.

== Songs ==
I. "Morgens steh' ich auf und frage" — The narrator speaks of his daily hope for his beloved to come to him, and his nightly disappointment when she does not. In D major.

II. "Es treibt mich hin" — The narrator is driven hither and thither in excitement about seeing his beloved, but the hours go too slowly for him. In B minor.

III. "Ich wandelte unter den Bäumen" — The grieving narrator wanders in the woods and finds that the birds already know the word that brings back his sorrow: they heard it from a pretty young woman. In B major.

IV. "Lieb' Liebchen" — The narrator compares his own heartbeat to a carpenter making a coffin; he wishes the pounding would stop so that he can sleep. In E minor.

V. "Schöne Wiege meiner Leiden" — The narrator bids farewell to the town in which he first saw his beloved and laments that he ever met her, as he would then never have become so miserable as he is now. In E major.

VI. "Warte, warte, wilder Schiffmann" — The narrator tells a boatman that he will come to the harbor to leave both Europe and his beloved. He compares the latter to Eve, who brought evil upon mankind. In E major.

VII. "Berg und Burgen schaun herunter" — The narrator is in a boat on the Rhine, which he describes as beautiful but also harboring death within it, like his beloved. In A major.

VIII. "Anfangs wollt' ich fast verzagen" — The narrator remembers how he used to think he could never bear his sorrow. Although he has done so, he does not want to be asked how. In D minor.

IX. "Mit Myrten und Rosen" — The narrator speaks of his wish to bury his book of songs, now that the songs lie cold and dead. But he also hopes that one day the spirit of love will rejuvenate them and that his beloved will see the book and the songs will speak to her. In D major.
