= Lebrecht Blücher Dreves =

German poet (1816–1870)

Lebrecht Blücher Dreves (12 September 1816 – 19 December 1870) was a German poet and translator of poetry from Hamburg.

== Biography ==
The Prussian general Blücher was his baptismal sponsor, whence his name. At age nineteen he submitted a volume of poems for the judgment of Adelbert von Chamisso and Gustav Schwab, and both expressed favourable opinions. This was followed shortly by another volume entitled Lyrische Anklange (Lyrical Melodies), grafted on the music of his favourites, Chamisso, Ludwig Uhland, Heinrich Heine, Friedrich Rückert, Schwab, and others. Over the next three years he studied jurisprudence, gaining the degree of doctor of laws summa cum laude. Another volume, entitled Vigilien (Vigils), followed, and in 1843 he published anonymously a third volume, Schlichte Lieder (Unpretentious Songs) embodying his battle-songs, Lieder eines Hanseaten. He converted to Catholicism in 1846, and took a job as notary out of financial difficulties. He also wrote the two-act comedy Der Lebensretter (The Life-Saver) inscribing it: "A manuscript printed for (improvised) private theatricals".

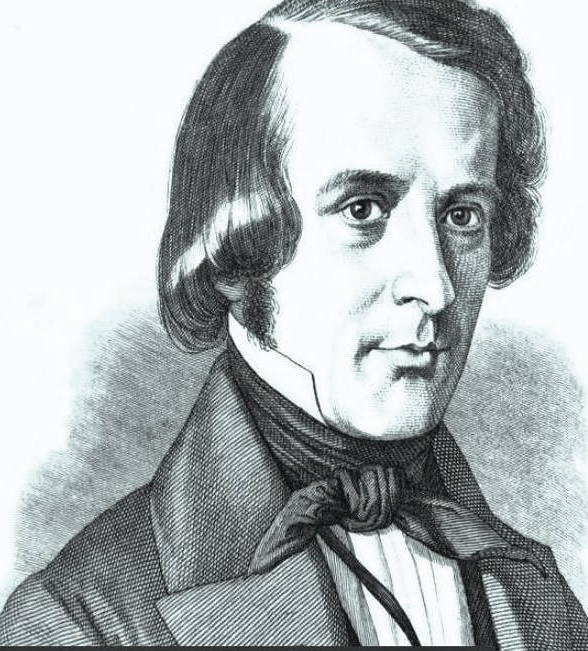
Lebrecht Dreves

His Lieder der Kirche (Church Hymns) paved his way to becoming a translator of hymns (2d ed., 1868). He also wrote a History of the Catholic Congregations in Hamburg and Altona. He likewise translated the Nachtigallenlied by the anonymous author known as "Pseudo-Bonaventura" and Rimbert Vita Ansgari. He undertook the task of editing (in 1867) sources regarding the history of his native city in the Annuae Missionis Hamburgensis 1589-1781. About this time he revised and republished his own poetical works, in which work he was aided by the poet Joseph Freiherr von Eichendorff who had become his good friend. He moved to Feldkirch in the Vorarlberg, and became friendly with the poet Gall Morel. His son, Guido Maria Dreves, was a Jesuit and the editor of the Analecta hymnica medii aevi, a large collection of medieval hymnology. Dreves died in Feldkirch.
