= Liederkreis, Op. 39 (Schumann) =

Song cycle composed by Robert Schumann

Liederkreis
- Song cycle by Robert Schumann
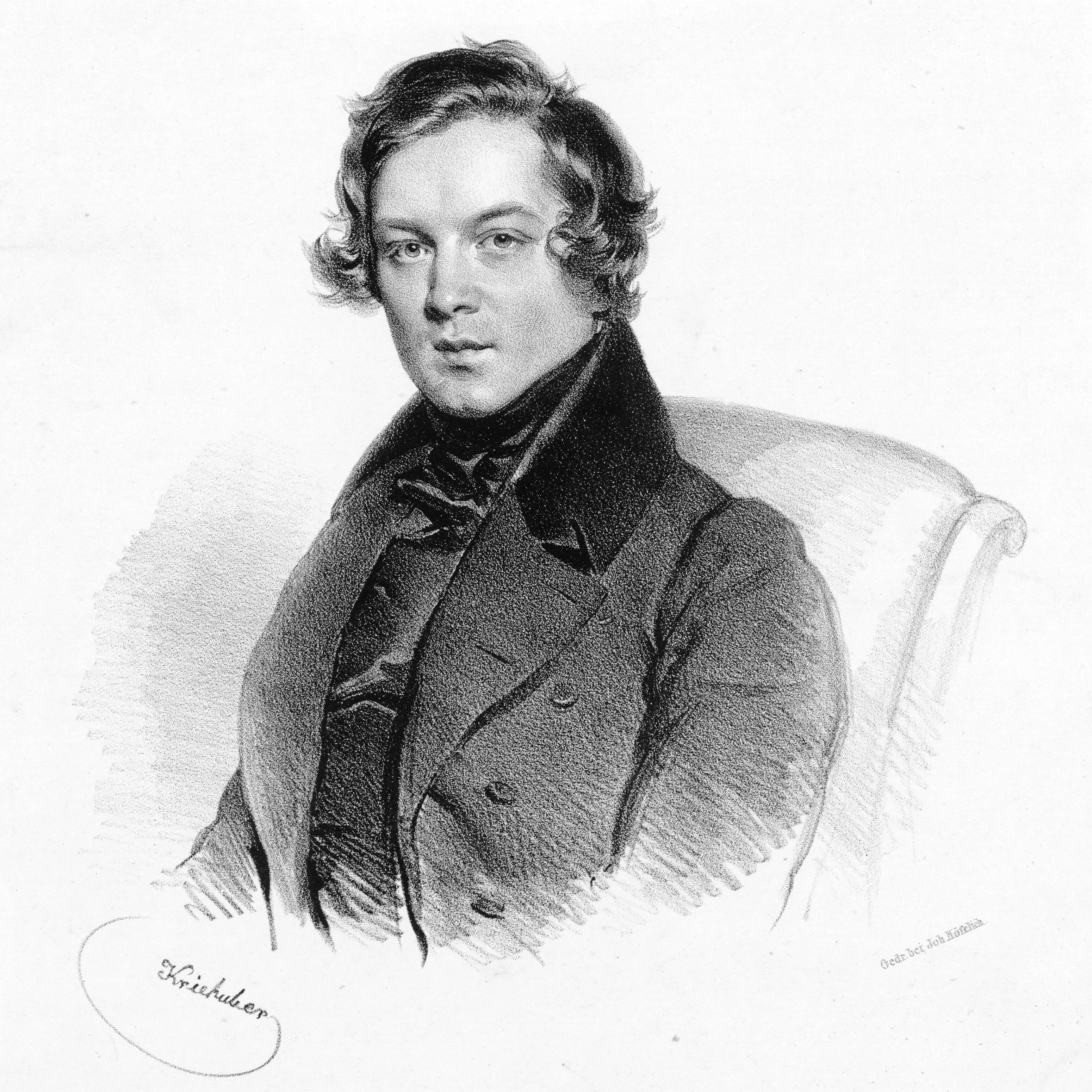
- The composer in 1839, lithograph by Josef Kriehuber
- English: Round of Songs
- Opus: 39
- Text: poems from Joseph von Eichendorff's Intermezzo
- Language: German
- Composed: 1840
- Movements: twelve
- Scoring: voice; piano

Liederkreis, Op. 39, is a song cycle composed by Robert Schumann. Its poetry is taken from Joseph von Eichendorff's collection entitled Intermezzo. Schumann wrote two cycles of this name – the other being his Opus 24, to texts by Heinrich Heine – so this work is also known as the Eichendorff Liederkreis. Schumann wrote, "The voice alone cannot reproduce everything or produce every effect; together with the expression of the whole the finer details of the poem should also be emphasized; and all is well so long as the vocal line is not sacrificed." Liederkreis, Op. 39, is regarded as one of the great song cycles of the 19th century, capturing, in essence, the Romantic experience of landscape. Schumann wrote it starting in May 1840, the year in which he wrote such a large number of lieder that it is known as his "year of song" or Liederjahr.

== Songs ==
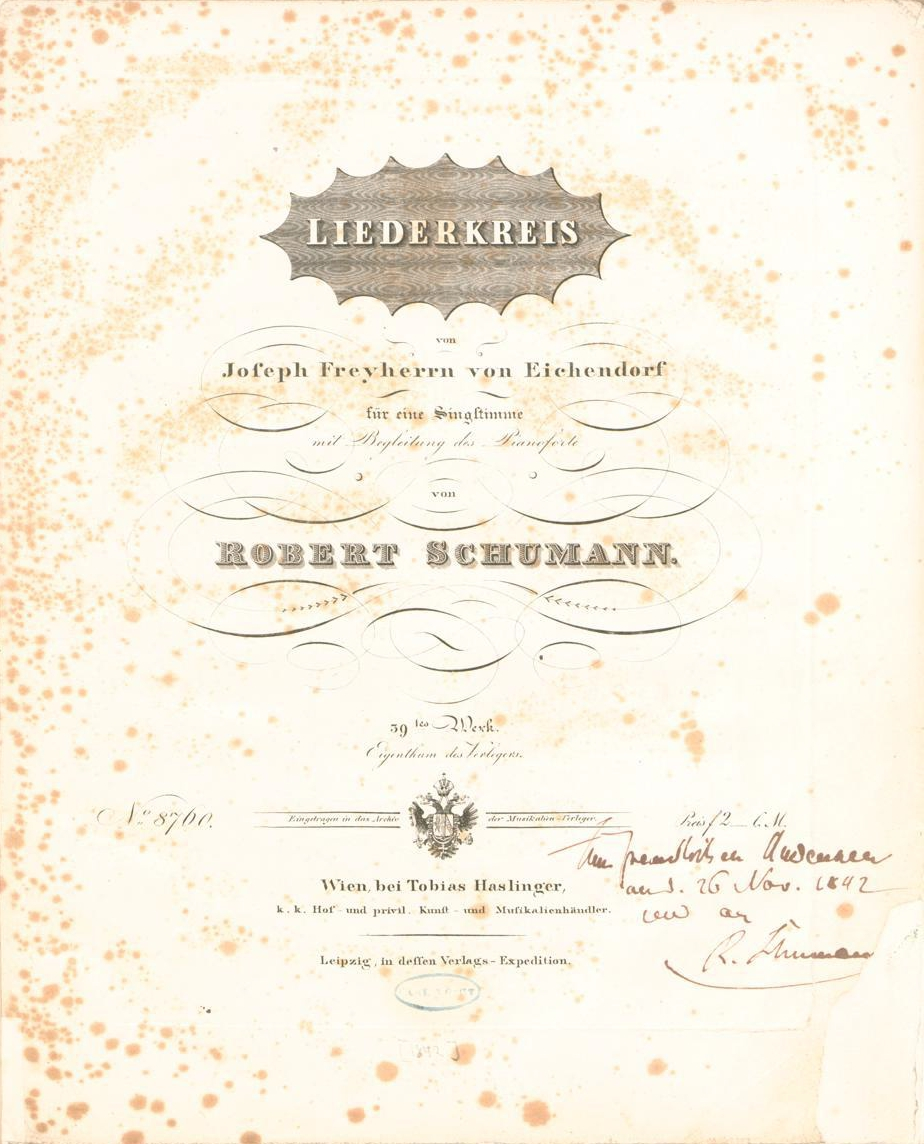
Title page, first edition (1842)

The cycle consists of twelve songs:

1. "In der Fremde" I
2. "Intermezzo"
3. "Waldesgespräch"
4. "Die Stille"
5. "Mondnacht"
6. "Schöne Fremde"
7. "Auf einer Burg"
8. "In der Fremde" II
9. "Wehmut"
10. "Zwielicht"
11. "Im Walde"
12. "Frühlingsnacht"

=== "In der Fremde" I ===
==== Form ====
The form of "In der Fremde" is ambiguous: there are arguments that it is through-composed and arguments that it is in the A–B–A form.

The evidence that "In der Fremde" is through-composed is found in both the melody and the harmony. The harmonic pattern is inconsistent enough to be through composed: The piece modulates from F♯ minor, to A major, to B minor, then back to F♯ minor. Within each of these keys, the general structure is comparable, but the last significant section (mm 22–28) is strikingly different. With each modulation, the melody changes. The modulations are not directly congruent with the stanza changes, which points to a through-composed piece.

It can be argued that "In der Fremde" takes an A–B–A–C form. Though they are in different keys, the first and third sections (A) have nearly the same melody and comparable harmonic structures. The second section (B) has all new melodic material and is in a major mode which contrasts with the A section. The final section is new material; it "echoes the last line of the first quatrain [and] stands in for a return of the entire quatrain", but does not constitute a restatement of the A section.

The form could also be interpreted as A–B–A′ if the focus is predominantly on the vocal line. There is a recurring motif between the A and A′ sections, and the difference between the two sections can be found in sparse accidentals and different intervals that make the variations on the original motif. The big difference is the change in key, as the A′ section is in B minor before the song modulates back to the home key, F♯ minor.

==== Text ====
German original

Aus der Heimat hinter den Blitzen rot
Da kommen die Wolken her,
Aber Vater und Mutter sind lange tot,
Es kennt mich dort keiner mehr.

Wie bald, ach wie bald kommt die stille Zeit,
Da ruhe ich auch, und über mir
Rauscht die schöne Waldeinsamkeit,
Und keiner kennt mich mehr hier.

Literal translation

From the homeland beyond the red lightning,
There come the clouds,
But father and mother are long dead,
Nobody knows me there any more.

How soon, oh how soon comes the silent time
When I also rest, and above me
Murmurs the sweet loneliness of the woods,
And nobody knows me here any more.

==== Setting to music ====
"In der Fremde"

Schumann opens this song cycle with the lied In der Fremde in F♯ minor with arpeggiated chords in the piano. These broken chords impart a feeling of perpetual motion, reflecting the stormy scene set up by the narrator. The dynamics (mostly piano) suggest that the storm is far away, yet the sense of urgency is still present in the single line of continuous, moving 16th notes. In the conjunct vocal line we feel the loneliness the narrator feels as he remembers his parents and reflects on his struggle.

The first stanza is accompanied completely in F♯ minor and ends with a perfect authentic cadence. Once the tone of the poem changes, the harmonic structure follows suit. At the beginning of the second stanza, Schumann modulates to A major to reflect the narrators hopeful longing for the "quiet time to come". The style of accompaniment in the A major section also changes, with a light and hopeful counter-melody in the right hand that stands in contrast to the metronomic urgency of the 16th notes. As the angst bleeds through from the pain of the realization that the narrator is alone, with no parents, the music lingers around the dominant in the uneasy A major. The applied chords in the beginning of this section help by tonicizing the dominant.

The A major section modulates to B minor, giving a dark and unexpected ending that transitions back into the home key. When we return to the home key of F♯ minor there is a tonic pedal that helps drive the movement to a close, giving a harmonic grounding as the moving 16th notes continue. With the addition of Neapolitan chords in measures 22 and 24, we as listeners feel the tension and unease that the narrator feels as he returns to his dark, lonely thoughts and continues towards death.

The only dynamic markings in the piece are in measures 1 and 5, indicating a piano or pianissimo dynamic. Schumann's choice of such minimal dynamics reflect the narrator's quiet resignation and longing for death. Later, specifically in the A major section, there are some crescendos and diminuendos marked in the piano part. The piece also has a relatively smooth texture, since the piano is playing legato arpeggios and the voice is singing a flowing, conjunct melody.

This movement of Liederkreis has several applied chords, such as V/V. Almost exclusively, these applied chords do not resolve to the expected chord. Instead, they resolve to different chords with the same harmonic functions. Throughout, there are applied chords of both the dominant (V) and subdominant (iv), which resolve to vii° and a Neapolitan chord (N), respectively. This has the effect of creating unexpected harmonic tension, heightening the emotions of the narrator.

=== "Intermezzo" ===
==== Text ====
German original

Dein Bildnis wunderselig
Hab' ich im Herzensgrund,
Das sieht so frisch und fröhlich
Mich an zu jeder Stund'.

Mein Herz still in sich singet
Ein altes, schönes Lied,
Das in die Luft sich schwinget
Und zu dir eilig zieht.

Literal translation

Your wondrous portrait
Have I in the bottom of my heart,
Which looks so freshly and cheerfully
Upon me at every hour.

My heart sings silently in itself
An old, beautiful song,
Which soars up into the air
And hurries to you.

=== "Waldesgespräch" ===
==== Text ====
German original

Es ist schon spät, es ist schon kalt,
Was reit'st du einsam durch den Wald?
Der Wald ist lang, du bist allein,
Du schöne Braut! Ich führ' dich heim!

„Groß ist der Männer Trug und List,
Vor Schmerz mein Herz gebrochen ist,
Wohl irrt das Waldhorn her und hin,
O flieh! Du weißt nicht, wer ich bin."

So reich geschmückt ist Roß und Weib,
So wunderschön der junge Leib,
Jetzt kenn' ich dich—Gott steh' mir bei!
Du bist die Hexe Loreley.

„Du kennst mich wohl—von hohem Stein
Schaut still mein Schloß tief in den Rhein.
Es ist schon spät, es ist schon kalt,
Kommst nimmermehr aus diesem Wald!“

Literal translation

It is already late, it is already cold,
Why are you riding alone through the woods?
The woods are long, you are alone,
You lovely bride! I'll lead you home!

"Great is the deceit and cunning of men,
For pain is my heart broken,
The hunting horn wanders to and fro,
Oh, flee! You do not know who I am."

So richly decorated are horse and woman,
So wondrously beautiful the youthful body,
Now I recognise you–God help me!
You are the witch Loreley.

"You know me well–from a high stone
My palace looks silently deep into the Rhine.
It is already late, it is already cold,
Nevermore leave these woods!"

=== "Die Stille" ===
==== Text ====
German original

Es weiß und rät es doch Keiner,
Wie mir so wohl ist, so wohl!
Ach, wüßt' es nur Einer, nur Einer,
Kein Mensch es sonst wissen soll!

So still ist's nicht draußen im Schnee,
So stumm und verschwiegen sind
Die Sterne nicht in der Höh',
Als meine Gedanken sind.

Ich wünscht', ich wär' ein Vöglein
Und zöge über das Meer,
Wohl über das Meer und weiter,
Bis daß ich im Himmel wär'!

Literal translation

Nobody knows or guesses,
How I am so happy, so happy!
Oh, only one knew, only one,
No other man might know!

It is not so quiet outside in the snow,
Not so silent and secretive are
The stars in the heavens,
As my thoughts are.

I wish I were a little bird
And flew over the sea,
Over the sea and beyond,
Until I were in heaven!

=== "Mondnacht" ===
"Mondnacht", first page

==== Form ====
It can be argued that the form of "Mondnacht" is strophic, with some slight deviations from the norm. The first two stanzas of the poetry are set to identical melodies in the vocal line, and there is also very strong similarity in the piano accompaniment, with only a few chords that differ. The digressions from the norm occur in the last stanza, where the vocal line varies in pitch, but retains the same rhythmic structure. Additionally, the repeated, blocked chords in the piano accompaniment become much thicker with the doubling of notes.

==== Text ====
"Mondnacht"
Elisabeth Schumann (no relation)

German original

Es war, als hätt' der Himmel
die Erde still geküsst,
dass sie im Blütenschimmer
von ihm nur träumen müsst!

Die Luft ging durch die Felder,
die Ähren wogten sacht,
es rauschten leis' die Wälder,
so sternklar war die Nacht.

Und meine Seele spannte
weit ihre Flügel aus,
flog durch die stillen Lande,
als flöge sie nach Haus.

Literal translation

It was as if the heavens had
Silently kissed the earth,
So that in a shower of blossoms she
Must only dream of him.

The breeze wafted through the fields,
The ears of corn waved gently,
The woods rustled faintly,
So starry-clear was the night.

And my soul stretched
its wings out far,
Flew through the quiet lands,
as if it were flying home.

=== "Schöne Fremde" ===
==== Text ====
German original

Es rauschen die Wipfel und schauern,
Als machten zu dieser Stund'
Um die halb versunkenen Mauern
Die alten Götter die Rund'.

Hier hinter den Myrtenbäumen
In heimlich dämmernder Pracht,
Was sprichst du wirr, wie in Träumen,
Zu mir, phantastische Nacht?

Es funkeln auf mich alle Sterne
Mit glühendem Liebesblick,
Es redet trunken die Ferne
Wie von künftigem großen Glück!

Literal translation

The treetops murmur and shudder,
As though at this hour
Around the half-sunken walls
The old gods were doing their rounds.

Here beyond the myrtle trees
In secret half-light magnificence,
What do you say wildly, as in dreams,
To me, fantastical night?

All the stars glimmer above me
With the glowing gaze of love,
They speak drunkenly of the far-away
As of great future happiness!

=== "Auf einer Burg" ===
==== Text ====
German original

Eingeschlafen auf der Lauer
Oben ist der alte Ritter;
Drüben gehen Regenschauer,
Und der Wald rauscht durch das Gitter.

Eingewachsen Bart und Haare,
Und versteinert Brust und Krause,
Sitzt er viele hundert Jahre
Oben in der stillen Klause.

Draußen ist es still und friedlich,
Alle sind in's Tal gezogen,
Waldesvögel einsam singen
In den leeren Fensterbogen.

Eine Hochzeit fährt da unten
Auf dem Rhein im Sonnenscheine,
Musikanten spielen munter,
Und die schöne Braut, die weinet.

Literal translation

Asleep on the look-out,
Up there is the old knight.
Above pass showers of rain,
And the wood rushes through the portcullis.

Beard and hair grown into one,
And breast and ruff fossilised,
He sits for many hundreds of years
Up there in the silent cell.

Outside it is quiet and peaceful,
Everyone has gone into the valley,
Birds of the woods sing solitarily
In the empty window arches.

A wedding processes beneath
On the Rhine in sunshine,
Musicians play merrily,
And the beautiful bride, she weeps.

=== "In der Fremde" II ===
==== Text ====
German original

Ich hör' die Bächlein rauschen
Im Walde her und hin,
Im Walde, in dem Rauschen
Ich weiß nicht, wo ich bin.

Die Nachtigallen schlagen
Hier in der Einsamkeit,
Als wollten sie was sagen
Von der alten, schönen Zeit.

Die Mondesschimmer fliegen,
Als säh' ich unter mir
Das Schloß im Tale liegen,
Und ist doch so weit von hier!

Als müßte in dem Garten
Voll Rosen weiß und rot,
Meine Liebste auf mich warten,
Und ist doch so lange tot.

Literal translation

I hear the brooklet rushing
In the woods, to and fro,
In the woods, in the rustling
I do not know where I am.

The nightingales sing
Here in the loneliness,
As though they wanted to speak
Of the old, beautiful time.

The moonbeams flit,
As though I saw below me
The castle which lies in the valley,
But is so far from here!

As though in the garden
Full of roses white and red,
My love might be waiting for me
But she has been dead so long!

=== "Wehmut" ===
==== Text ====
German original

Ich kann wohl manchmal singen,
Als ob ich fröhlich sei,
Doch heimlich Tränen dringen,
Da wird das Herz mir frei.

Es lassen Nachtigallen,
Spielt draußen Frühlingsluft,
Der Sehnsucht Lied erschallen
Aus ihres Kerkers Gruft.

Da lauschen alle Herzen,
Und alles ist erfreut,
Doch keiner fühlt die Schmerzen,
Im Lied das tiefe Leid.

Literal translation

I can sometimes sing,
As though I were cheerful,
And yet secretly tears penetrate,
Then my heart is freed.

Nightingales allow
As spring air plays outside
Their song of longing to ring out
From their dungeon tomb.

All hearts listen to it,
And all are overjoyed,
But nobody feels the pain,
In the song of deep sorrow.

=== "Zwielicht" ===
==== Text ====
German original

Dämmrung will die Flügel spreiten,
Schaurig rühren sich die Bäume,
Wolken ziehn wie schwere Träume—
Was will dieses Graun bedeuten?

Hast ein Reh du lieb vor andern,
Laß es nicht alleine grasen,
Jäger ziehn im Wald und blasen,
Stimmen hin und wieder wandern.

Hast du einen Freund hienieden,
Trau ihm nicht zu dieser Stunde,
Freundlich wohl mit Aug' und Munde,
Sinnt er Krieg im tück'schen Frieden.

Was heut gehet müde unter,
Hebt sich morgen neugeboren.
Manches geht in Nacht verloren—
Hüte dich, sei wach und munter!

Literal translation

Dusk is to spread its wings,
The trees stir eerily,
Clouds pass like heavy dreams–
What would this terror mean?

If you have a roe deer favoured above the rest,
Do not let it graze alone,
Hunters pass in the woods and trumpet,
Voices wander now and again.

If you have a friend here below,
Do not trust him at this hour,
Quite friendly with eye and mouth,
He plots war in deceitful peace.

What goes beneath weary today,
Rises tomorrow new-born.
Much gets lost in the night–
Watch yourself, be wakeful and brisk!

=== "Im Walde" ===
==== Text ====
German original

Es zog eine Hochzeit den Berg entlang,
Ich hörte die Vögel schlagen,
Da blitzten viel Reiter, das Waldhorn klang,
Das war ein lustiges Jagen!

Und eh' ich's gedacht, war alles verhallt,
Die Nacht bedecket die Runde;
Nur von den Bergen noch rauschet der Wald
Und mich schauert's im Herzensgrunde.

Literal translation

A wedding was drawing along the hill,
I heard the birds singing,
Then there flashed many riders, the hunting horn sounded,
It was a pleasing hunt!

And before I knew it, everything died down,
Night covers all around;
Only from the mountain does the wood still murmur
And it quakes me in the bottom of my heart.

=== "Frühlingsnacht" ===
==== Music ====
This song's title means 'spring night'. It was the most popular of the cycle's twelve during Schumann's lifetime, and one of the most popular Lieder of all the nineteenth century. The text's themes of nature and Romantic ecstasy in love, typical of Eichendorff, were dear to Schumann, and the song has captured the imaginations of many composers since. Liszt made a famous transcription for piano.

==== Text ====
German original

Über'm Garten durch die Lüfte
Hört' ich Wandervögel zieh'n,
Das bedeutet Frühlingsdüfte,
Unten fängt's schon an zu blühn.

Jauchzen möcht' ich, möchte weinen,
Ist mir's doch, als könnt's nicht sein!
Alte Wunder wieder scheinen
Mit dem Mondesglanz herein.

Und der Mond, die Sterne sagen's,
Und im Traume rauscht's der Hain
Und die Nachtigallen schlagen's:
Sie ist Deine, sie ist Dein!

Literal translation

Above the garden through the air
I heard wandering birds of passage flying,
This is a sign of the scents of spring,
Beneath it is already beginning to bloom.

I would rejoice, would weep,
For to me it is as though it could not be!
Old wonders shine again
With the moon's splendour in them.

And the moon, the stars speak it,
And in the dream the grove murmurs it
And the nightingales sing it:
She is yours, she is yours!
