= Dichterliebe =

Song cycle composed by Robert Schumann

- Song cycle by Robert Schumann
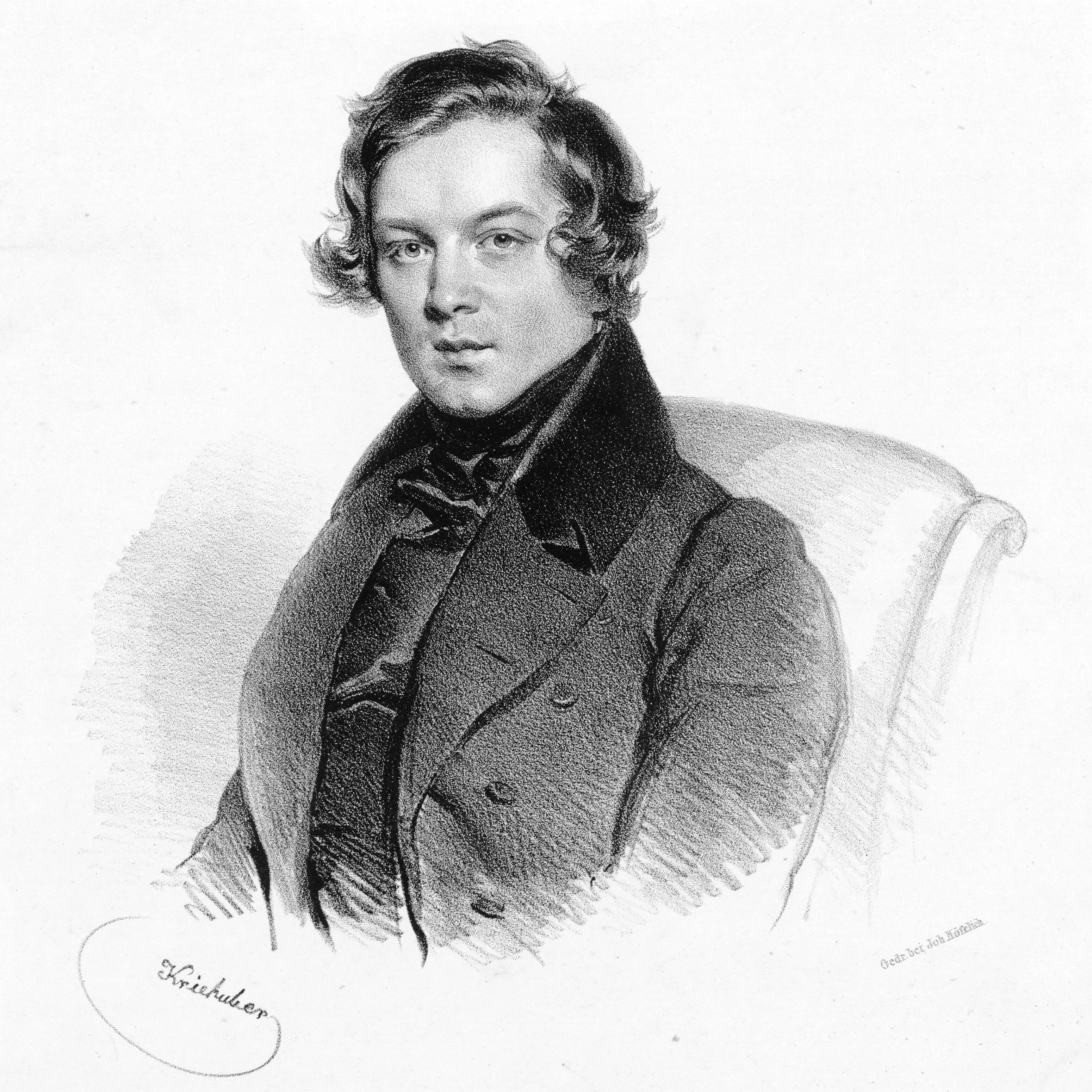
- The composer in 1839
- English: A Poet's Love
- Opus: 48
- Text: poems from Lyrisches Intermezzo by Heinrich Heine
- Language: German
- Composed: 1840
- Dedication: Wilhelmine Schröder-Devrient
- Published: 1844
- Movements: 16
- Scoring: voice (soprano or tenor); piano

Dichterliebe, A Poet's Love (composed 1840), is the best-known song cycle by Robert Schumann (Op. 48). The texts for its 16 songs come from the Lyrisches Intermezzo by Heinrich Heine, written in 1822–23 and published as part of Heine's Das Buch der Lieder. Along with the song cycles of Franz Schubert (Die schöne Müllerin and Winterreise), Schumann's form the core of the genre in musical literature.

== Source: Heine's Lyrisches Intermezzo ==
Author of the sarcastic Die Romantische Schule, Heine was a vocal critic of German romanticism, though he is often described as a quintessentially Romantic writer. In some of his poetry, and notably in Deutschland. Ein Wintermärchen (1844), romantic lyrical conventions are used as vessels to deploy biting, satirical nature. Dichterliebe was composed before Heine's Deutschland and does not appear to portray this ironic dimension: scholarship is divided as to what extent Schumann intended to express it.

Heine's Lyrisches Intermezzo consists of a verse Prologue and 65 poems. The Prologue (Es war 'mal ein Ritter trübselig und stumm – There once was a Knight, woeful and silent) tells of the sorrowful knight who sits gloomily in his house all day, but by night is visited by his fairy (nixie) bride, and dances with her until daylight returns him to his little poet's room (Poeten-stübchen). The 65 poems follow, of which the 16 of the Dichterliebe are a selection. The conclusion of it is that he is going to put the old bad songs and dreams, all his sorrowful love and suffering, into a huge coffin that 12 giants will throw into the sea. This catastrophe is slightly reminiscent of Schubert's Die schöne Müllerin, in which the hero ends by drowning himself in the brook he has followed through the cycle.

== Song cycle ==
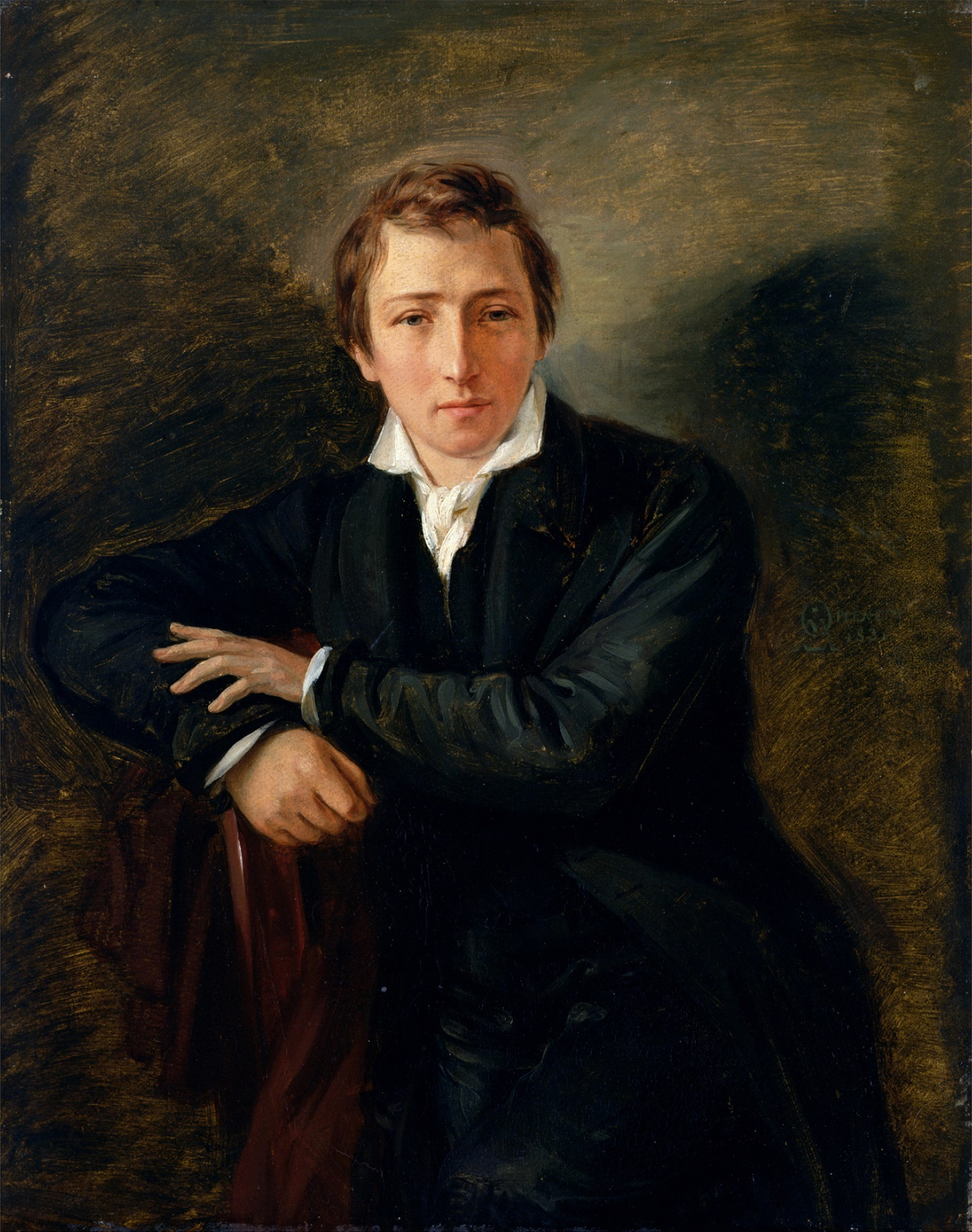
1831 portrait of Heinrich Heine

Das Buch der Lieder was given its second edition, with preface from Paris, in 1837, the songs were composed in 1840, and the first edition of Dichterliebe was published in two volumes by Peters, in Leipzig, in 1844. In the original 1840 version with the 20 songs (originally dedicated to Felix Mendelssohn Bartholdy), the cycle had the following, longer title: "Gedichte von Heinrich Heine – 20 Lieder und Gesänge aus dem Lyrischen Intermezzo im Buch der Lieder ("Poetry by Heinrich Heine – 20 Lyrics and Songs from the Lyric Intermezzo in the Book of Songs")". Though Schumann originally set 20 songs to Heine's poems, only 16 of the 20 were included in the first edition. Dein Angesicht (Heine no. 5) is one of the omitted items. Auf Flügeln des Gesanges, On Wings of Song (Heine no 9), is best known from a setting by Felix Mendelssohn.

The famed introduction to the first song, Im wunderschönen Monat Mai, is a direct quotation from Clara Wieck-Schumann's Piano Concerto in A minor (1835). It comes from the third beat of measure 30 through the second beat of measure 34 of the second movement. Robert uses the same key, same melodic pattern, similar accompaniment textures, tempo and rhythmic patterns in measures 1 through 4 of the opening to Dichterliebe.

The poems' very natural, almost hypersensitive affections are mirrored in Schumann's settings, with their miniaturist chromaticism and suspensions. The poet's love is a hothouse of nuanced responses to the delicate language of flowers, dreams and fairy tales. Schumann adapts the poems' text to his needs, sometimes repeating phrases and often rewording a line to supply the desired cadence. Dichterliebe is therefore an integral artistic work apart from the Lyrisches Intermezzo, though derived from and inspired by it. Schubert's selection of lyrics for his Heine songs sought different themes.

Although often associated with the male voice, Dichterliebe was dedicated to the soprano Wilhelmine Schröder-Devrient, so the precedent for performance by female voice is primary. The first complete public recital of the work in London was given by Harry Plunket Greene, accompanied from memory by Leonard Borwick, on 11 January 1895 at London's St James's Hall.

== Songs ==
"Ich will meine Seele tauchen", opus 48,5

(The synopses here are made from the Heine texts.)

1. Im wunderschönen Monat Mai (Heine, Lyrical Intermezzo no 1). ("In beautiful May, when the buds sprang, love sprang up in my heart: in beautiful May, when the birds all sang, I told you my desire and longing.")
2. Aus meinen Tränen sprießen (Heine no 2). ("Many flowers spring up from my tears, and a nightingale choir from my sighs: If you love me, I'll pick them all for you, and the nightingale will sing at your window.")
3. Die Rose, die Lilie, die Taube, die Sonne (Heine no 3). ("I used to love the rose, lily, dove and sun, joyfully: now I love only the little, the fine, the pure, the One: you yourself are the source of them all.")
4. Wenn ich in deine Augen seh (Heine no 4). ("When I look in your eyes all my pain and woe fades: when I kiss your mouth I become whole: when I recline on your breast I am filled with heavenly joy: and when you say, 'I love you', I weep bitterly.")
5. Ich will meine Seele tauchen (Heine no 7). ("I want to bathe my soul in the chalice of the lily, and the lily, ringing, will breathe a song of my beloved. The song will tremble and quiver, like the kiss of her mouth which in a wondrous moment she gave me.")
6. Im Rhein, im heiligen Strome (Heine no 11). ("In the Rhine, in the sacred stream, great holy Cologne with its great cathedral is reflected. In it there is a face painted on golden leather, which has shone into the confusion of my life. Flowers and cherubs float about Our Lady: the eyes, lips and cheeks are just like those of my beloved.")
7. Ich grolle nicht (Heine no 18). ("I do not chide you, though my heart breaks, love ever lost to me! Though you shine in a field of diamonds, no ray falls into your heart's darkness. I have long known it: I saw the night in your heart, I saw the serpent that devours it: I saw, my love, how empty you are.")
8. Und wüßten's die Blumen, die kleinen (Heine no 22). ("If the little flowers only knew how deeply my heart is wounded, they would weep with me to heal my suffering, and the nightingales would sing to cheer me, and even the starlets would drop from the sky to speak consolation to me: but they can't know, for only One knows, and it is she that has torn my heart asunder.")
9. Das ist ein Flöten und Geigen (Heine no 20). ("There is a blaring of flutes and violins and trumpets, for they are dancing the wedding-dance of my best-beloved. There is a thunder and booming of kettle-drums and shawms. In between, you can hear the good cupids sobbing and moaning.")
10. Hör' ich das Liedchen klingen (Heine no 40). ("When I hear that song which my love once sang, my breast bursts with wild affliction. Dark longing drives me to the forest hills, where my too-great woe pours out in tears.")
11. Ein Jüngling liebt ein Mädchen (Heine no 39). ("A youth loved a maiden who chose another: the other loved another girl, and married her. The maiden married, from spite, the first and best man that she met with: the youth was sickened at it. It's the old story, and it's always new: and the one whom she turns aside, she breaks his heart in two.")
12. Am leuchtenden Sommermorgen (Heine no 45). ("On a sunny summer morning I went out into the garden: the flowers were talking and whispering, but I was silent. They looked at me with pity, and said, 'Don't be cruel to our sister, you sad, death-pale man.'")
13. Ich hab' im Traum geweinet (Heine no 55). ("I wept in my dream, for I dreamt you were in your grave: I woke, and tears ran down my cheeks. I wept in my dreams, thinking you had abandoned me: I woke, and cried long and bitterly. I wept in my dream, dreaming you were still good to me: I woke, and even then my floods of tears poured forth.")
14. Allnächtlich im Traume (Heine no 56). ("I see you every night in dreams, and see you greet me friendly, and crying out loudly I throw myself at your sweet feet. You look at me sorrowfully and shake your fair head: from your eyes trickle the pearly tear-drops. You say a gentle word to me and give me a sprig of cypress: I awake, and the sprig is gone, and I have forgotten what the word was.")
15. Aus alten Märchen winkt es (Heine no 43). "(The old fairy tales tell of a magic land where great flowers shine in the golden evening light, where trees speak and sing like a choir, and springs make music to dance to, and songs of love are sung such as you have never heard, till wondrous sweet longing infatuates you! Oh, could I only go there, and free my heart, and let go of all pain, and be blessed! Ah! I often see that land of joys in dreams: then comes the morning sun, and it vanishes like smoke.")
16. Die alten, bösen Lieder (Heine no 65). ("The old bad songs, and the angry, bitter dreams, let us now bury them, bring a large coffin. I shall put very much therein, I shall not yet say what: the coffin must be bigger than the great tun at Heidelberg. And bring a bier of stout, thick planks, they must be longer than the Bridge at Mainz. And bring me too twelve giants, who must be mightier than the Saint Christopher in the cathedral at Cologne. They must carry away the coffin and throw it in the sea, because a coffin that large needs a large grave to put it in. Do you know why the coffin must be so big and heavy? I will put both my love and my suffering into it.")

== Recordings ==
These are some landmarks among the many recordings of Dichterliebe:

- Ian Bostridge with Julius Drake (1998)
- Suzanne Danco with Guido Agosti, 1949, (Decca 78 rpm AK 2310–12).
- Thom Denijs (tenor) with Enni Denijs-Kroyt, 1928 (First complete electric-microphone recording) (His Master's Voice 78 rpm D2062-64).
- Dietrich Fischer-Dieskau with Alfred Brendel (Philips CD Dig 416 352–2).
- Fischer-Dieskau with Jörg Demus, EMG review November 1957 (DGG LPM 18370)
- Fischer-Dieskau with Christoph Eschenbach (1973–77) (DGG CD 439 417–2).
- Fischer-Dieskau with Vladimir Horowitz (live recording, 1976) (Sony Classical 074644674323).
- Wolfgang Holzmair with Imogen Cooper (Philips Dig 446 086–2).
- Gerhard Hüsch with Hanns Udo Müller (1930s) (HMV 78 rpm).
- Lotte Lehmann with Bruno Walter (1940s) (Philips Minigroove LP ABL 3166, Columbia 10-inch LP 33C1020).
- Walther Ludwig with Michael Raucheisen, EMG review April 1955 (DGG LP 16029)
- Charles Panzéra (baritone) with Alfred Cortot, 1935 (HMV DB 4987–89).
- Ian Partridge with Jennifer Partridge, 1974 (CfP CD CFP 4651)
- Peter Pears with Benjamin Britten
- Aksel Schiøtz with Gerald Moore (1946), (HMV 78 rpm DB 6270–72, HMV BLP 1064).
- Peter Schreier with Norman Shetler (issued 1972) (DGG LP 2530 353).
- Schreier with Christoph Eschenbach (issued 1991) (Teldec 3 CDs 2292–46154).
- Bernhard Schütz with Reinhold Friedl (issued 2011) (Bôłt CD BR POP01).
- Gérard Souzay with Dalton Baldwin, 1962 (Philips CD 442 741–2).
- Souzay with Jacqueline Bonneau, 1953 (Decca CD 440 065–2)
- Souzay with Alfred Cortot (Live, Paris 1956) (Italian Cetra LP LO 501).
- José van Dam with Dalton Baldwin (Kerner lieder and Dichterliebe) (Forlane CD B0000541 FL).
- Georgy Vinogradov with Georg Orentlicher, 1950–1951. In Russian (Preiser Records, CD. PR89118).
- Fritz Wunderlich with Hubert Giesen (DGG CD 449 7472).

== In literature ==
- Dichterliebe is prominently featured in Jon Marans's play Old Wicked Songs. In the play, a young American pianist travels to Europe to overcome an artistic block that threatens his career. Through his work with a renowned Viennese musician with a checkered past, he explores the nature of meaning and artistry through Schumann's music. The play takes its name from the cycle's final song.
- The first song, Im wunderschönen Monat Mai, plays a key role in Julio Cortázar's short story "The Secret Weapons".
- In Michael Nyman's chamber opera The Man Who Mistook His Wife for a Hat, one of the protagonists sings Ich grolle nicht.
- In "Cudzoziemka" by Maria Kuncewiczowa the song Ich grolle nicht plays a crucial role for the protagonist.
