= Myrthen =

1840 song cycle by Robert Schumann

- Song cycle by Robert Schumann
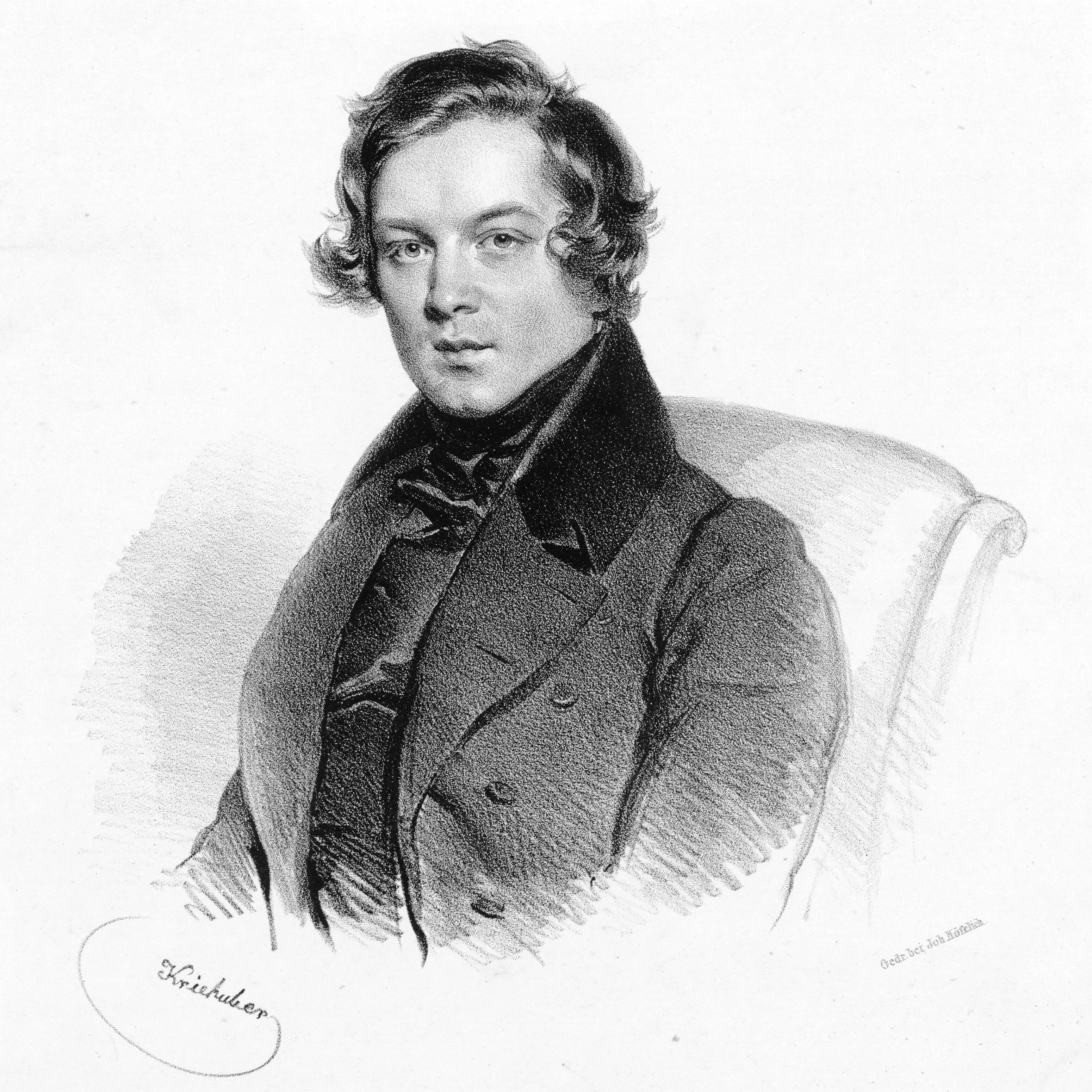
- Robert Schumann in 1839
- English: Myrtles
- Opus: 25
- Text: Poems by various authors, partly translated
- Language: German
- Composed: 1840
- Dedication: Clara Wieck
- Scoring: voice and piano

Myrthen (Myrtles), Op. 25, is a song cycle composed in the spring of 1840 by Robert Schumann. Its 26 Lieder were written as a wedding gift for his fiancée, Clara Wieck, and presented to her on the eve of their wedding which took place on 12 September that year. The cycle was published that same month, with a dedication to Clara, in four books by Kistner in Leipzig where the couple lived.

The texts are poems by various authors, including eight by Robert Burns, translated into German by the poet Wilhelm Gerhard, and several each by Friedrich Rückert, Johann Wolfgang von Goethe, and Heinrich Heine. The cycle was originally published in a version for high voice, but has been performed by singers of all voice types, sometimes with a woman and man alternating.

The opening song "Widmung" (Dedication) is the best-known song from the cycle. Regarded as a profound expression of marital devotion, it was one of Clara Schumann's favourites among her husband's Lieder.

== Composition ==
Myrthen was a product of Schumann's 1840 "year of song". On 23 January he jotted down an early version of his setting of Heine's "Du bist wie eine Blume", the first song recorded in his Berliner Liederbuch, and eventually to be published as No. 24 in the cycle. This was followed by notes for various songs later to form part of several other song cycles. Rebecca Grotjahn writes that "the notion of uniting the songs into a cycle [appears] to have arisen only gradually". She also points out that the songs were likely originally arranged into books by their librettist: "the songs later published as Myrthen were ... intended as a book of songs after Goethe, a book after Burns, and two books of songs after assorted poets." Only after the great majority of the songs in Myrthen had been worked out did Schumann begin in the late spring of 1840 to consider publication as a cycle for both this work and the Liederkreis, Op. 39. Division into four books seems to have been the intention from early on, not only in light of pragmatic consideration of publication logistics, but also as an aid to the cyclical structure of Myrthen. But even after this approach had been decided upon, Schumann changed the songs' ordering several times.

On 7 March 1840 Schumann offered Myrthen to his publisher Kistner. He wrote that he intended them to appear in print as a bridal gift in the form of a song cycle in four books. The title refers to myrtles, traditionally part of a bride's outfit. On 1 August, a court judgement gave Clara and Robert permission at last to marry, following a long legal battle in which the bride's father Friedrich Wieck had bitterly contested their union. Schumann presented Clara with an opulently decorated copy of the first edition of the Myrthen on the eve of their wedding. The printed dedication "To his beloved bride" addresses not only this private occasion, but also the public matter of the legality of their marriage; Schumann was eager to publicise the court's decision. By the publication of Myrthen, writes Grotjahn, Schumann not only positioned himself as "a man inspired to create by joyous love"; he intended by the work's symbolic title to provide "proof of his success as a commercially minded man just as well as his success as creative artist". Schumann gave the collection to Clara on the eve of their wedding which took place on 12 September that year. The musicologist Eric Sams asked in his book, The Songs of Robert Schumann, "what bride ever had a finer wedding gift?"

== Structure ==
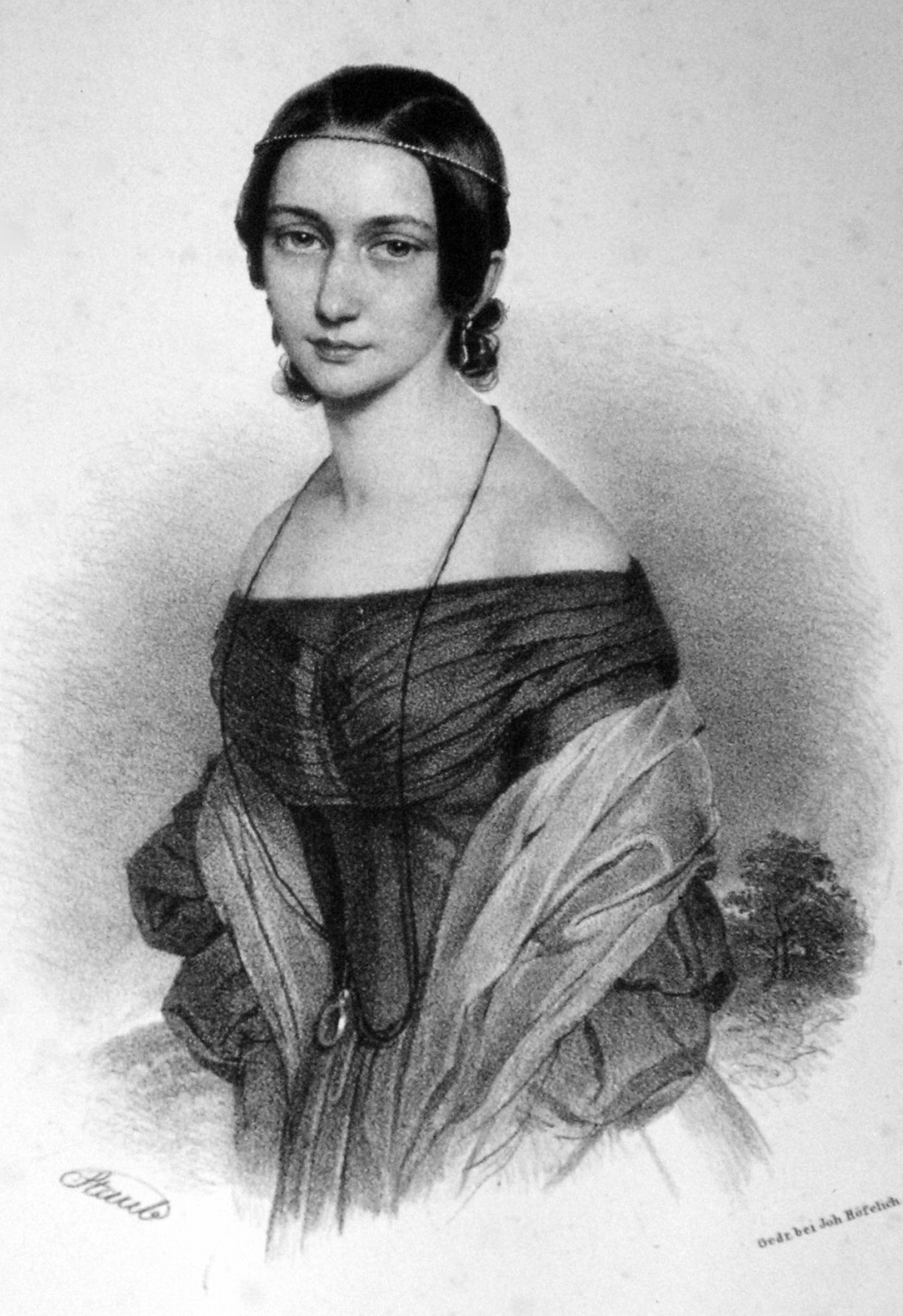
Clara Wieck in 1839

In many musicological treatments, the Myrthen have been taken to lack the systematic structure which characterises a cycle. Karl H. Wörner called them "a colourful wreath abundant in individual flowers" which have, nevertheless, no unifying idea. Peter Gülke considers it more of a "collection of songs ... than a coherent cycle" and senses that behind the cycle lies a "private motivation" more strongly motivating than the aim of well-unified art: namely that Schumann "had need of the songs in order to grow ever closer to his bride". Likewise Arnfried Edler finds that the title Myrthen relates only to the cycle's functional purpose as a sort of bride-price for Clara, the primarily personal character of the songs underlined by titles such as "Widmung" (Dedication) and "Zum Schluss" (At the End), which bear proverbial relations to opportunity and good fortune. According to a German saying, Das beste kommt zum Schluss (the best comes at the end).

These views are grounded largely in an understanding of the song cycle as a musical form, which takes songs' texts to be foremost, and ties a cycle's coherence to the unity of its texts. Such a unity Schumann is supposed to have achieved in the Eichendorff Liederkreis, the Dichterliebe and other cycles constructed similarly. Grotjahn argues that in the wake of his piano cycles of the 1830s, Schumann experimented with various song-cycle arrangements, beginning at the latest in 1840; and that the Myrthen as they stood at publication were testament to only one of several previous attempts on Schumann's part to integrate many fragmented songs into a well-formed cyclical structure. And she holds that the "composition of a song cycle [begins] with the composition of poems", so that Schumann should be regarded as the author of the Myrthen's text "even more extensively than in his other cycles".

Grotjahn writes that "the Myrthen are not simply a series of 26 songs, but four books of songs related each to the others by their structures." Books 1, 2 and 3 contain six songs each, while book 4 contains eight songs, though it is shorter than the others. Each book contains songs with texts by three or four poets, and each is closed by a pair of songs after a single poet. In designing things like this, Schumann arranges the songs of Myrthen into characteristic groupings in which formal unity arises in the resulting complementary and contrasting pairs.

In their thematic content almost all of the songs concern such contemporary issues in Robert and Clara's relationship as longing, lovers' pains, marriage and motherhood. At its core, though, the cycle is held together in its overarching themes of art, freedom and love, made apt by the circumstances of the Schumanns' lives, but having significance beyond them. Grotjahn writes: "the songs not only relate to Schumann's circumstances at the time – his approaching wedding and its troubled background – but also offer a general picture of his artistic persona." This picture is conveyed in private ciphers and musical codes, typical of Schumann's compositions, entirely comprehensible only to the pair of lovers, and some likely only to the composer himself. Throughout Myrthen, Schumann works themes into slight variations upon one another in correspondent songs and pairs of songs. Similarly, in his treatment of tonality he works to create connections and symmetries in the music; for example by employment of keys related to A♭, in which the work begins and ends, by a long and consistent digression into sharp keys in songs falling in the middle of the work, and by shifts in tonality through fifths and thirds; his motivic approach meant that he frequently fused the piano coda belonging to one song into the beginning of the following song, the result being in some instances chains of several related songs flowing continuously one into the next.

== Table of songs ==
No.	Poem	English translation	Poet	Key	Time
Book 1
1	"Widmung"	Dedication	Rückert	A♭ major	3/2
2	"Freisinn"	Free Spirit	Goethe	E♭ major	common time
3	"Der Nussbaum"	The (Wal)nut Tree	Mosen	G major	6/8
4	"Jemand"	Someone	Burns	G major/E major	2/4
	Lieder aus dem Schenkenbuch im Divan	Songs from the Book of the Cupbearer in the Divan	Goethe		
5	No. 1, "Sitz' ich allein"	I sit alone		E major	2/4
6	No. 2, "Setze mir nicht, du Grobian"	Don't set down for me, you oaf		A minor/A major	6/8
Book 2
7	"Die Lotosblume"	The Lotus-flower	Heine	F major	6/4
8	"Talismane"	Talismans	Goethe	C major	common time
9	"Lied der Suleika"	Suleika's Song	Willemer	A major	common time
10	"Die Hochländer-Witwe"	The Highlander's Widow	Burns	E minor	6/16
	Lieder der Braut	Songs of the Bride	Rückert		
11	No. 1, "Mutter, Mutter! Glaube nicht"	Mother, mother, do not believe		G major	2/4
12	No. 2, "Lass mich ihm am Busen hangen"	Let me rest upon his chest		G major	2/4
Book 3
13	"Hochländers Abschied"	Highlander's Farewell	Burns	B minor	3/8
14	"Hochländisches Wiegenlied"	Highland Lullaby	Burns	D major	common time
15	"Aus den hebräischen Gesängen"	From the Hebrew Melodies	Byron	E minor	common time
16	"Räthsel"	Riddle	Fanshawe	B major	common time
	Zwei Venetianische Lieder	Two Venetian songs	Moore		
17	"No. 1, Leis' rudern hier, mein Gondolier!"	Row gently here, my gondolier!		G major	2/4
18	"No. 2, Wenn durch die Piazzetta"	When through the piazzetta		G major	2/4
Book 4
19	"Hauptmanns Weib"	The Captain's Woman	Burns	E minor	6/8
20	"Weit, weit"	Far, far	Burns	A minor	6/8
21	"Was will die einsame Träne?	What does this lonely tear want?	Heine	A major	6/8
22	"Niemand. Seitenstück zu 'Jemand'"	Nobody. Companion to "Somebody"	Burns	F major	common time
23	"Im Westen"	In the west	Burns	F major	6/4
24	"Du bist wie eine Blume"	You are like a flower	Heine	A♭ major	2/4
25	"Aus den östlichen Rosen"	From Eastern Roses	Rückert	E♭ major	2/4
26	"Zum Schluss"	To the end	Rückert	A♭ major	common time

=== Book 1 ===
"Widmung", the first song in Myrthen, treats one of the cycle's central themes, love. The text was composed by Friedrich Rückert, though Schumann made modifications to it, changing the title in order directly to engage the dedicatee, Clara. He also doubled both the first and last verses, in order for the song to conform to a A-B-A structure. "Widmung" establishes A♭ as the home key of the cycle. The piano accompaniment is figured by broken chords doubled in octaves, set in dotted rhythms characteristic of Schumann. The second stanza is set to a key change from A♭ to E major; here the accompaniment is replaced by repeated-chord triplet figurations.

This song is the best-known of the cycle, and was among Clara Schumann's favourite songs of her husband's. It is regarded as a profound expression of love and marital devotion, having a text which encapsulates the meaning of the entire poem. The song features prominently in the film Song of Love, a fictionalisation of the Schumanns' marriage. Several famous transcriptions have been made of this song, including an especially popular one by Liszt, his S. 566, made in 1846–1847 and issued in print by Kistner in 1848. It is his most popular arrangement for the piano and one of his most frequently performed works.

"Freisinn", sung by tenor Mirko Guadagnini

A melodic idea appearing in "Widmung"'s piano coda is reused in the following song, "Freisinn" (Free Spirit), composed after a poem by Goethe. Its key of E♭ is related to "Widmung"'s A♭, and its material is connected motivically to "Widmung"'s. On this basis they are regarded as a pair, in which not only the theme of love but also Schumann's concept of the artist as a man "inspired and freed through love" is exposed.

This theme of love is explored further in "Der Nussbaum", setting a text by Julius Mosen. It is a through-composed song with a piano accompaniment in wave-like semiquaver figures; throughout dominant sixth suspensions add a characteristic harmonic flavour. The key is G, the mediant of "Freisinn"'s E♭. Heinemann describes the song: "It depicts a nut tree in blossom. For a girl in the gentle summer breeze, the tree inspires thoughts of intimate partnership which she dare not admit to herself; and thus the prospect of marriage and matrimony is revealed." The simple melodic line is in partnership with the arpeggios in the piano that represent the breeze in the tree.

The cycle's first setting of a Burns poem, "Jemand" (No. 4), is free in its form, a song with "intimate" but also "passionate" character, characterized by rests, mercurial changes in tempo and recitative-like passages. Practically every one of the ten appearances of the word Jemand (somebody) is set to a different suspension. Schumann revisits the harmonic lexicon of "Der Nussbaum" in setting the last occurrence of the word, sung to a suspended sixth.

Schumann closes the cycle's first book with settings of two poems by Goethe, whose collective title Aus dem Schenkenbuch is due to their selection from the "Book of the Cupbearer", one of twelve parts constituting the West-östlicher Divan. The first song, "Sitz' ich allein" (No. 5), is through-composed. Its formal compactness makes it the cycle's shortest. Its text dwells upon the experience of a lonely drinker and treats ideas relating to the cycle's broad theme of freedom. Schumann's freedom with form in this song manifests itself in the sudden change in the tenth bar from the key of E and the main time signature of 2/4 to C and 6/8. This hiatus lasts only four bars, before the home key and time signature are restored for a recapitulation of the song's opening phrase, which is clipped and repeated to the song's end for an echoing effect.

E is the dominant of A minor, the opening key of the second of the Schenkenbuch songs, "Setze mir nicht, du Grobian" (No. 6). This song's text also concerns drinking, but here directly engages the eponymous cupbearer of Goethe's book, addressed here as Du lieblicher Knabe (You charming boy). Possibly Schumann sought in this song to create ironic distance between himself and the homoerotic experiences of his past, his mind on his forthcoming marriage to Clara. The A-section's vigorous syncopations and the emphatic right-hand pedal on E in the opening have an exaggerated quality to match the speaker's rejection of the Grobian (oaf). Likewise the B-section's shift into the parallel major key as the speaker invites the "cupbearer-to-be" to enter is almost saccharine. The poem's final line, Jeder Wein ist schmackhaft und helle (Every wine is tasty and bright), makes plausible allusion to bisexuality and is followed in the setting by an energetic coda for the piano.

=== Book 2 ===
Schumann centres the cycle's second book around a pair of poems each by Goethe and Rückert. But as well as the opening song to a text by Heine, Schumann includes a setting of "The Highland Widow's Lament" by Burns. It is the first in a narrative set, continued in the third book, of Burns songs about highland life, though this song is unusual amongst them since it regards death. Schumann uses key relationships in order to tie this part of the cycle to later sections. The keys of songs 3 to 7 are: G major, E minor, E major, A minor/A major, and F major. An almost identical scheme of keys appears in songs 17 to 23, in the third and fourth books.

The second cycle opens with "Die Lotosblume" (No. 7), the first setting in the cycle of a poem by Heine. The poem mainly treats quiet longing, but touches upon the erotic. The song is through-composed, but Schumann sets each line of the poem in a single two-bar phrase, with some rhythmic regularity. The first stanza's setting begins with a statement in bars 2–3, a motif whose notes Sams identifies as a musical cipher for Clara, the non-diatonic letters L and R substituted for neighbouring notes: C, B♭, A, G♯, A. But the second stanza's modulation in bars 9–10 from the dominant key C major to A♭ major signals "the courting moon's passage to the island of the mediant, marked out not only by [the change of] key but by the disappearance of the bass".

The opening line of "Talismane" (No. 8), Gottes ist der Orient! ("The Orient is God's!"), is set melodically to the notes of a C-major triad. Eric Sams conjectures that this motif, sung and then echoed hy the piano, is a musical cypher for Schumann himself. The song is marked Feierlich, nicht zu langsam (Solemn, not too slow); it is a setting of the first three stanzas of another poem from Goethe's West-östlicher Divan, whose text has its origins in a Surah from the Koran; Schumann set the same three verses again in his choral cycle Vier doppelchörige Gesänge. The song's inclusion in the Myrthen owes possibly to its third verse, which deals thematically with the creation of art and God's constant love:

Mich verwirren will das Irren,
Doch du weisst mich zu entwirren.
Wenn ich handle, wenn ich dichte,
Gib du meinem Weg die Richte!

My errors would bewilder me,
But You know how to disentangle me.
When I act, when I compose poetry,
Show me the right path!

The "Lied der Suleika" (No. 9) takes its text from West-östlicher Divan, but it is one of the few poems in that collection which was probably not originally the work of Goethe, but Marianne von Willemer, an actress, singer and acquaintance of Goethe's at Frankfurt. The poem is an intimate treatment of the force of love poetry and song. Schumann's song in strophic form sets each stanza to the same melody, though the final strophe is modified. Schumann sets the words in the first stanza, "Lied, empfind' ich deinen Sinn!" ("Song, I can feel your meaning!"); Sams identifies this motif as a cryptogram for Clara. The motif's chromaticism is also in evidence in the piano coda. The vocal line is mirrored in the piano, as a reflection of the absent lover mentioned in the text.

"Die Hochländer-Witwe" (No. 10), setting a translation of a poem by Burns, uses the unusual time signature of 6/16. Its key is E minor. The poem describes the fate of an outcast widow who has lost everything, throwing the surrounding Lieder into sharp relief and leaving the highland narrative without resolution until the cycle's third book.

The book ends with two poems by Rückert, Lieder der Braut (Songs of the bride, Nos. 11 and 12). They are typically assigned to a woman singer when the cycle is performed by two singers. The poems' female speaker suggests the idealised perspective of Clara. The first song, "Mutter, Mutter! Glaube nicht" (No. 11) is marked Andantino and Sehr innig. Its time is 2/4, its key G major, and it employs strophic form. In the poem, a bride reassures her mother that her love for her has only been deepened by the love she bears her bridegroom. In the piano, a placid chordal progression plays out beneath semiquaver accompaniment in the right hand.

The second of the Lieder der Braut, "Lass mich ihm am Busen hangen" (No. 12), takes the same time signature and key as the first. From Rückert's single-stanza poem Schumann measures out a song in strophic form; the second strophe's beginning comes at the poem's repetition of the word Enden, and is heralded by a diminished seventh chord in the piano and a fermata. The song is introduced in the piano by a statement of the melody of the opening line, Lass mich ihm am Busen hangen ("Let me rest upon his chest"); this line is repeated at the song's end in bars 29–32 and the song ends with an answering phrase in the piano which mirrors the melody's rhythm and shape. With the piano's final notes the voice reenters with the words Lass mich.

=== Book 3 ===
The third book consists of six songs, all setting poems by English-language writers in translation. It begins with "Hochländers Abschied" (No. 13), setting a translation by Gerhard of Burns's poem "The Highlander's Farewell". It describes Highland life and the sadness in saying goodbye. Schumann's setting is a strophic song in B minor, though three strophes are in B major. An introduction, an interlude and a coda for the piano are identical.

The book is closed by a pair from Moore's Venetian Songs, with somewhat erotic content, "Leis' rudern hier, mein Gondolier!" (Row gently here, my gondolier!, No. 17) and "Wenn durch die Piazzetta" (When through the piazzetta, No. 18).

=== Book 4 ===
Book 4 begins as Book 3 ended, with a couple of poems, now by Burns. "Hauptmann's Weib" (No. 19) illustrates the warrior's actions dramatically in the outer sections of a ternary form, while the middle section repeats a brooding motif in the piano.

The following "Weit, weit" (No. 20) portrays a woman's desire for an absent lover with lyric expression. This simple strophic song reaches its expressive climax only in the piano postlude after the third stanza.

Heines "Du bist wie eine Blume" (You are like a flower, No. 24) is one of the poems set to music most often, and "one of Schumann's finest".

The last two songs are again based on works by one poet, Rückert, the same poet as in the first song, "Widmung". "Aus den östlichen Rosen" (From the Eastern roses, No. 25) is taken from a cycle Oestliche Rosen (Eastern Roses), which the poet titled "Ein Gruss an die Entfernte". "Zum Schluss" (To the end, No. 26) contrasts the incomplete situation on earth to an ideal love in Heaven. The key is A♭ major as in the opening song, closing a circle. The last song bears the dedication: "Here ... I have woven for you an imperfect garland, sister, bride!".

== Recordings ==
Complete recordings of Myrthen include and are not limited to those listed below:

Singer	Pianist	Year	Notes
Petre Munteanu	Franz Holetschek	1955	
Edith Mathis, Dietrich Fischer-Dieskau	Christoph Eschenbach	1975	
Nellie van der Sijde, Maarten Koningsberger	Kelvin Grout	1989	
Lynne Dawson, Ian Partridge	Julius Drake	1994	
Nathalie Stutzmann	Michel Dalberto	1995	
Juliane Banse, Olaf Bär	Helmut Deutsch	1998	
Dorothea Röschmann, Ian Bostridge	Graham Johnson	2002	
Sophie Koch	Nelson Goerner	2005	
Diana Damrau, Ivan Paley	Stephan Matthias Lademann	2006	Includes letters by the Schumanns, read by Martina Gedeck and Sebastian Koch
Andrea Brown, Thomas E. Bauer	Uta Hielscher	2011	
Christian Gerhaher, Camilla Tilling	Gerold Huber	2019	
Camilla Tilling, Christian Gerhaher	Gerold Huber	2022	

Recordings of individual selections from Myrthen abound, but complete recordings of the cycle are rare. Of the ten complete recordings listed, seven divide the songs between a male and a female singer, as the cycle's open-ended subtitle, "For singer and pianoforte", permits, though the Mathis and Fischer-Dieskau recording was apparently the result of compilation by the record label and not originally intended to be a whole-cycle recording. In these recordings, the cycle's songs are divided differently between the voices, lending special emphasis to certain songs, and drawing out new thematic and narrative strands in the cycle.

Grotjahn also observes that the structure of key relationships within the cycle is compromised by transposition for different voice types. For instance, when "Widmung" ("Dedication"), No. 1, is performed by a man, the biographical significance which Schumann's own dedication of the cycle to his bride carries is highlighted; when performed by a woman the text's principal theme of love as a springboard for artistic inspiration comes to the fore. In other songs the singer's voice type may suggest a particular biographical significance for the Schumanns. Performed by a man, "Räthsel" ("Riddle"), No. 16, takes on the tone of an address from Robert to Clara; performed by a woman, there is the sense of an inner monologue about it.

== Performances ==
An annual festival, Schumann-Woche, has been held in Leipzig for several days around the wedding day, 12 September. In 2012, Myrthen was performed by four singers at the Schumann House on that day.
