= Permanent Missions of the Federal Republic of Germany and the German Democratic Republic =

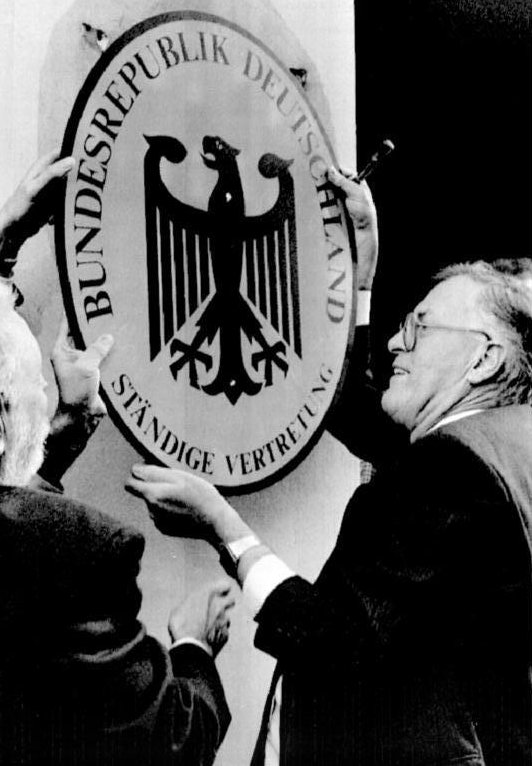
On 2 October 1990, the last head of the Permanent Mission of the Federal Republic of Germany by the GDR, Franz Bertele personally unscrewed the sign on his office building. With German reunification, the mission's work ended.

Permanent Missions of the Federal Republic of Germany (FRG) and the German Democratic Republic (GDR) (German: Ständige Vertretungen der Bundesrepublik Deutschland und der Deutschen Demokratischen Republik) were permanent representative missions established in a 1972 treaty and effective from 1973 to 1989 "in the seats of their respective governments" according to Article 8 of the Basic Treaty. They served as de facto embassies for each other.

== Origins and development ==
Preceding the permanent missions the GDR operated unofficial missions in Western countries, such as Britain, where "KfA Ltd", an agency of the Kammer für Außenhandel, or Department of Foreign Trade of the Ministry of Foreign Affairs, was established in 1959. By the early 1970s, this had begun to function as a de facto East German embassy in London, including diplomats on its staff.

The permanent seats in practice were ambassadors so the DDR also referred to them as ambassadors. They had to accredit themselves to the head of state of the other country. The representative of West Germany by the head of state council and the representative of East Germany by the president of the republic.

By contrast, East Germany did consider West Germany a completely separate country, meaning that while the East German mission in Bonn was accredited to the West German Chancellery, its West German counterpart in East Berlin was accredited to East Germany's Ministry of Foreign Affairs.

== FRG representatives in East Berlin, GDR ==
Permanent representatives of the FRG by the GDR were:

- Günter Gaus (1974–81)
- Klaus Bölling (1981–82)
- Hans-Otto Bräutigam (1982–89)
- Franz Bertele (1989–1990, replacement for Günther Gaus 1977–1980)

== GDR representatives in Bonn, FRG ==
Permanent representatives of the GDR in the FRG were:

- Michael Kohl (1974–1978)
- Ewald Moldt (1978–1988)
- Horst Neubauer (1988–1990)

== Ginkgo ==
On the main side of the Federal Ministry of Education and Research building on Hannoverschen Street on a small square between the west wing of the Ministry and a building of the Humboldt University of Berlin there were three ginkgo biloba tree. Günter Gaus, the first Permanent Representative, reported in an interview with Die Zeit in January 1981, during a visit to the Goethe House in Weimar, that a woman gave a ginkgo leaf and that he recited the poem Gingo Biloba.

The poem was from the "West-östlichen Divan". The second verse is about the characteristic shape of biloba leaves, known for being bilobed.: The artist Ben Wagin planted them on 28 November 2000. He had previously planted them in November 1988, but they had been destroyed during the renovation of the property.

Ist es Ein lebendig Wesen,
Das sich in sich selbst getrennt,
Sind es zwey die sich erlesen,
Das man sie als Eines kennt.

translation:

Is it one living being,
Which has separated in itself?
Or are these two, who chose
To be recognized as one?

In Goethe resonates with a developmental historical interest, but above all the realization that behind the cultural diversity (or, depending on the viewing restriction and weight) behind the dualism of the world (West - East) reveals a consistent pattern, an archetype. For the couple Gaus and the citizens of the GDR was the ginkgo leaf symbol of a divided, but belong together in Germany. Incidentally, it also symbolizes the history of the Ministry itself: it emerged in November 1994 of two ministries, the BMBW and the BMFT, which has entertained his field office after the dissolution of the Permanent Mission here.
