= Gingo biloba =

1815 poem by Johann Wolfgang von Goethe

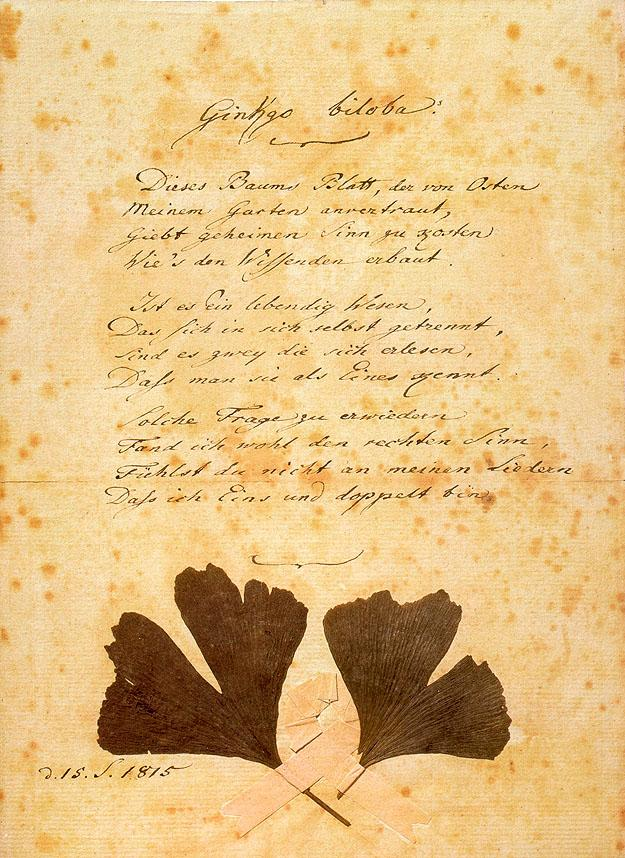
The "Ginkgo biloba" letter, 27 September 1815

"Gingo biloba" (originally "Ginkgo biloba") is a poem written in September 1815 by the German poet Johann Wolfgang von Goethe. Written as a show of friendship to Marianne von Willemer, the poem was later published in his collection West–östlicher Divan (West–Eastern Divan) in 1819. Goethe used "Gingo" instead of "Ginkgo" in later publications to avoid the hard sound of the letter "k".

The poem's inspiration came when Goethe sent Marianne (1784–1860), the wife of the Frankfurt banker Johann Jakob von Willemer (1760–1838), a ginkgo leaf as a symbol of friendship and on 15 September 1815, he read his draft of the poem to her and friends. On 23 September he saw Marianne for the last time. Then he showed her the Ginkgo tree in the garden of Heidelberg Castle from which he took the two leaves pasted onto the poem. After that he wrote the poem and sent it to Marianne on 27 September 1815. Directly across from the Ginkgo tree stands the Goethe memorial tablet. The poem was published later in the "Book of Suleika" in West–östlicher Diwan.

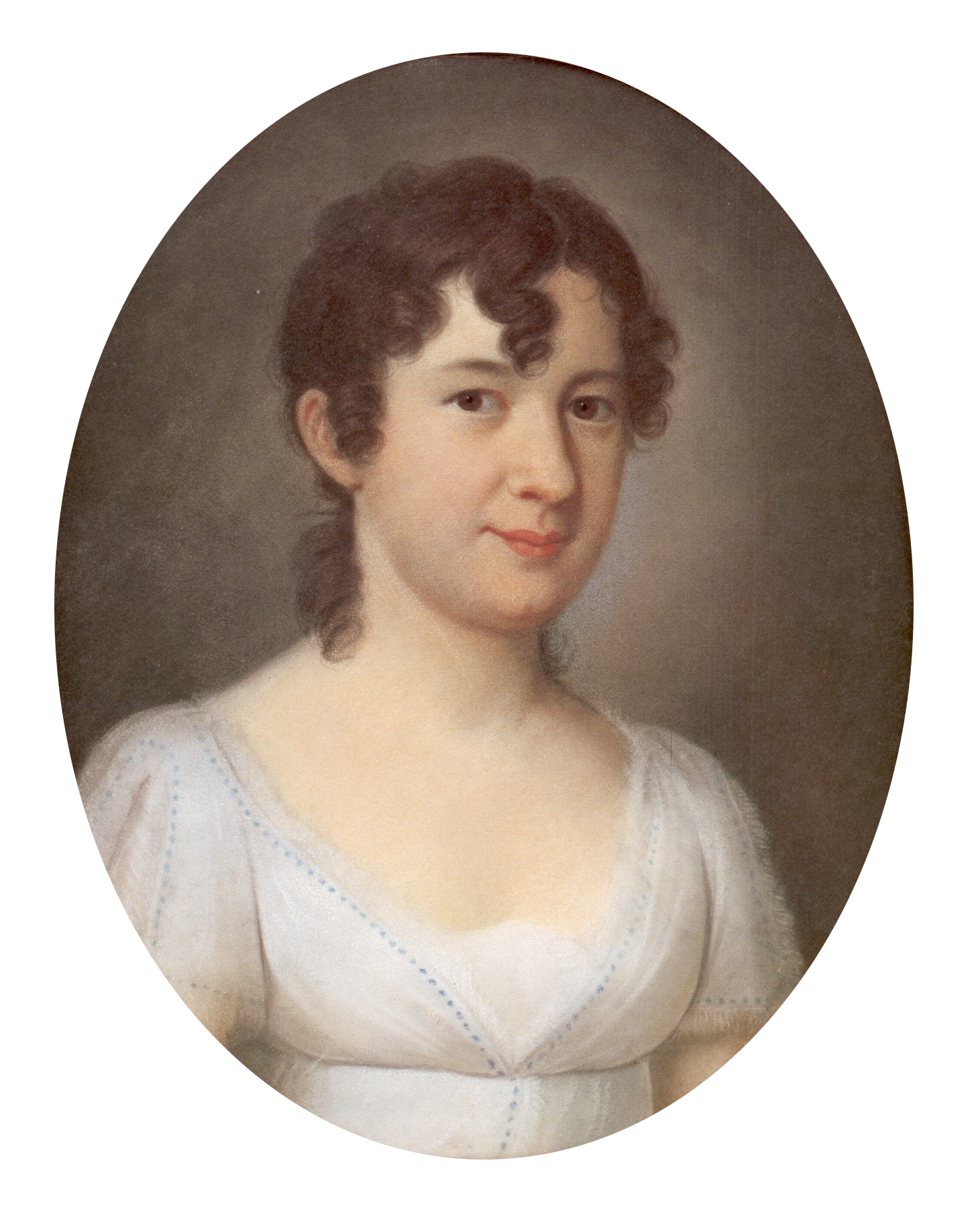
Marianne von Willemer, the poem's recipient

Dieses Baums Blatt, der von Osten
Meinem Garten anvertraut,
Giebt geheimen Sinn zu kosten,
Wie's den Wissenden erbaut,

Ist es Ein lebendig Wesen,
Das sich in sich selbst getrennt?
Sind es zwei, die sich erlesen,
Daß man sie als Eines kennt?

Solche Frage zu erwidern,
Fand ich wohl den rechten Sinn,
Fühlst du nicht an meinen Liedern,
Daß ich eins und doppelt bin?

In my garden's care and favour
From the East this tree's leaf shows
Secret sense for us to savour
And uplifts the one who knows.

Is it but one being single
Which as same itself divides?
Are there two which choose to mingle
So that each as one now hides?

As the answer to such question
I have found a sense that's true:
Is it not my songs' suggestion
That I'm one and also two?

The letter containing this poem with which Goethe included two Ginkgo leaves with two distinct lobes can be viewed in the Goethe Museum in Düsseldorf. The Ginkgo (planted in 1795) that Goethe led Marianne von Willemer to in September 1815 is no longer standing today. After 1928 the Ginkgo tree in the castle garden was labelled as "the same tree that inspired Goethe to create his fine poem". The tree was probably still standing in 1936. A Ginkgo-Museum is located in Weimar.
