= Ian Bostridge =

English tenor and historian (born 1964)

Ian Bostridge CBE
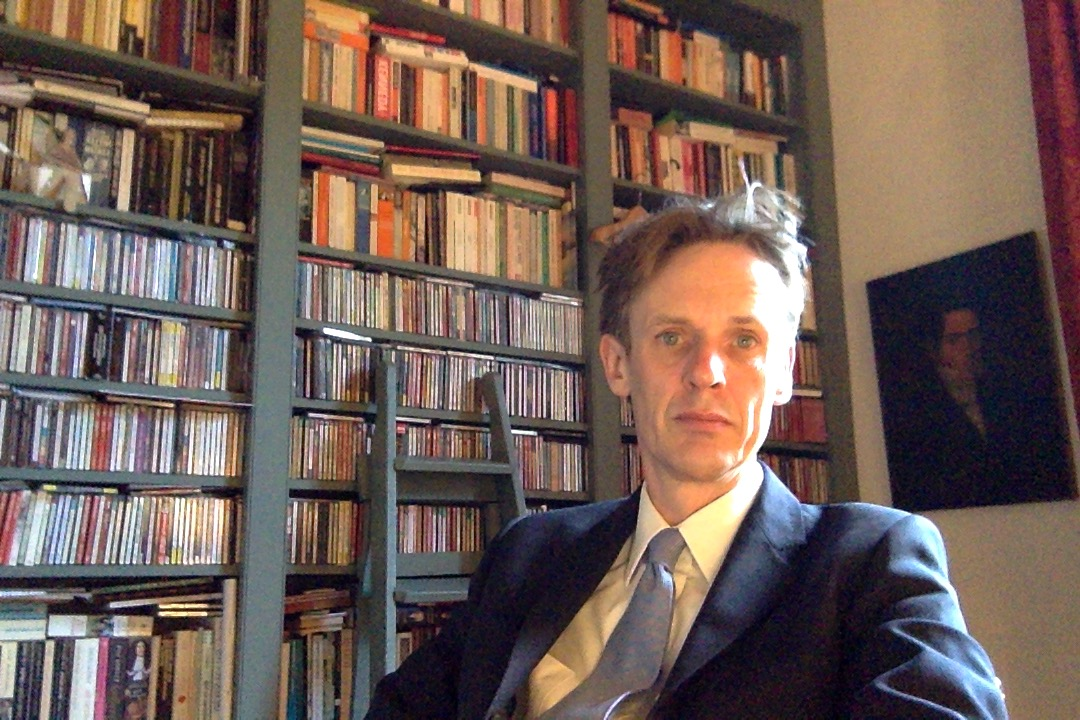
- Ian Bostridge, 2018
- Born: Ian Charles Bostridge; 25 December 1964 (age 61); London, England
- Education: Westminster School (Queen's Scholar)
- Alma mater: St John's College, Oxford (BA, MA); St John's College, Cambridge (M.Phil.); University of Oxford (D.Phil.)
- Occupation: Teacher • historian • singer (tenor)
- Known for: Witchcraft and Its Transformations, c. 1650–1750 (1997)
- Spouse: Lucasta Miller
- Children: 2
- Musical career
- Genres: Choral music; Italian opera
- Instrument: Voice (Tenor)
- Years active: 1991–present

Ian Charles Bostridge CBE (born 25 December 1964) is a renowned English tenor and historian.

== Early life ==
Bostridge was born in London, the son of Leslie Bostridge and Lillian (née Clark). His father was a chartered surveyor. He is the brother of writer and critic Mark Bostridge, and they are the great-grandsons of the Tottenham Hotspur goalkeeper from the early twentieth century, John "Tiny" Joyce.

=== Academic career ===
He was a Queen's Scholar at Westminster School. He attended St John's College, Oxford, where he attained first class honours in Modern History, and St John's College, Cambridge, where he attained an M.Phil. in the History and Philosophy of Science. He was awarded a D.Phil. degree in history from the University of Oxford in 1990, for his work on the importance of witchcraft in English public life from 1650 to 1750 that had been supervised by Sir Keith Thomas.

He worked in television news and documentaries for two years in London before becoming a British Academy postdoctoral fellow at Corpus Christi College, Oxford, where he taught political theory and eighteenth-century British history. His book Witchcraft and Its Transformations, c. 1650–1750 was published as an Oxford Historical Monograph in 1997, and was described as "the most sophisticated and original of all recent histories of early modern demonology" by Professor Stuart Clark. It "achiev[es] that rarest of feats in the scholarly world: taking a well-worn subject and ensuring that it will never be looked at in quite the same way again" (Noel Malcolm, TLS).

== Musical career ==
=== Debuts ===
Bostridge began singing professionally at age 27. In 1991 he won the National Federation of Music Societies Award and from 1992 received support from the Young Concert Artists Trust. He made his Wigmore Hall debut in 1993, followed by an acclaimed Winterreise at the Purcell Room and his Aldeburgh Festival debut in 1994. In 1995, he gave his first solo recital in the Wigmore Hall (winning the Royal Philharmonic Society's Debut Award). He gave recitals in Lyon, Cologne, London and at the Aldeburgh, Cheltenham and Edinburgh Festivals in 1996 and at the Alte Oper, Frankfurt in 1997.

On the concert platform, he has appeared with the London Symphony Orchestra under Sir Colin Davis and Mstislav Rostropovich, the Scottish Chamber Orchestra under Sir Charles Mackerras, and the City of Birmingham Symphony and Berlin Philharmonic under Sir Simon Rattle.

His first solo-featured recording was for Hyperion Records, a Britten song recital, The Red Cockatoo with Graham Johnson. His subsequent recording of Die schöne Müllerin in Hyperion's Franz Schubert Edition won the Gramophone's Solo Vocal Award for 1996. He won the prize again in 1998 for a recording of Robert Schumann Lieder with his regular collaborator, the pianist Julius Drake and again in 2003 for Schumann's Myrthen and duets with Dorothea Röschmann and Graham Johnson, as part of the Hyperion Schumann edition.

An EMI Classics exclusive artist since 1996, he is a 15-time Grammy Award nominee and 3-time winner. His CDs have won all of the major record prizes including Grammy, Edison, Japanese Recording Academy, Brit, South Bank Show Award, Diapason d'Or de l'Année, Choc de l'Année, Echo Klassik and Deutsche Schallplattenpreis. His recording of Schubert's "Die Forelle" with Julius Drake forms part of the soundtrack of the 2011 film Sherlock Holmes: A Game of Shadows. His album of Shakespeare Song for Warner Classics won the 2017 Grammy award and the Echo Klassik award for solo vocal.

Bostridge made his operatic debut in 1994, aged 29, as Lysander in A Midsummer Night's Dream with Opera Australia at the Edinburgh Festival, directed by Baz Luhrmann. In 1996, he made his debut with the English National Opera, singing his first Tamino (The Magic Flute). In 1997, he sang Quint in Deborah Warner's new production of The Turn of the Screw under Sir Colin Davis for the Royal Opera. He has recorded Flute (Britten's A Midsummer Night's Dream) with Sir Colin Davis for Philips Classics; Belmonte (Die Entführung aus dem Serail) with William Christie for Erato; Tom Rakewell (The Rake's Progress) under John Eliot Gardiner for Deutsche Grammophon (Grammy Award); and Captain Vere (Billy Budd) (Grammy Award) with Daniel Harding. In 2007 he appeared at the ENO in the role of Aschenbach in Britten's Death in Venice, in a production by Deborah Warner.

=== 1997–1999 ===
In 1997, he made a film of Schubert's Winterreise for Channel 4 directed by David Alden; he has been the subject of a South Bank Show profile documentary on ITV and presented the BBC 4 film The Diary of One Who Disappeared about Czech composer Leoš Janáček. He has written for The New York Review of Books, The New York Times,The Guardian, The Times, Financial Times,The Times Literary Supplement, Opernwelt, Gramophone, BBC Music Magazine, Opera Now and The Independent.

Later engagements included recitals in Paris, Stockholm, Lisbon, Brussels, Amsterdam and the Vienna Konzerthaus. In North America he appeared in recitals in New York City at the Frick Collection in 1998 and Alice Tully Hall in 1999 and made his Carnegie Hall debut under Sir Neville Marriner. Also in 1998, he sang Vasek in a new production of The Bartered Bride under Bernard Haitink for the Royal Opera and made his debut at the Munich Festival as Nerone (L'incoronazione di Poppea) and in recital (Winterreise at the Cuvilliés Theatre). In 1999, he made his debut with the Vienna Philharmonic under Sir Roger Norrington. He works regularly with the pianists Julius Drake, Graham Johnson, Mitsuko Uchida, composer Thomas Adès and Covent Garden music director Antonio Pappano. Other partners at the piano have included Leif Ove Andsnes, Håvard Gimse, Saskia Giorgini, Igor Levit, and Lars Vogt.

=== Since 2000 ===
In the summer of 2000 Bostridge gave the fifth annual Edinburgh University Festival Lecture entitled "Music and Magic".

In 2004, Bostridge was made CBE for his services to music. He is an Hon RAM, honorary fellow of Corpus Christi College, St John's College, and Wolfson College Oxford, and was awarded an honorary doctorate by the University of St Andrews in 2003. He was Humanitas Professor of Classical Music and Education at the University of Oxford, 2014–15 (part of the Humanitas Programme). In 2020/21 he was a visiting professor at Munich's Hochschule for Music and Theatre. From 2022 on he is giving courses on Schubert Lieder at the Music and Arts University of the City of Vienna.

He gave the inaugural Nicholas Breakspear lecture, "Classical Attitudes: Latin and music through the ages" at the University of Trondheim in 2015; and the annual BIRTHA lecture, "Humanity in Song: Schubert's Winter Journey" at the University of Bristol in the same year. He delivered the Lincoln Kirstein Lecture, "Song and Dance", at NYU in 2016. He gave the Berlin Family Lectures at the University of Chicago in April 2021 and the Anthony Hecht Lectures at Bard College in October 2025.

Bostridge had his own year-long Perspectives series at Carnegie Hall in 2005/6, and a twelve-month residency at the Barbican in 2008, "Homeward Bound". He has had a Carte Blanche season at the Concertgebouw and further artistic residencies in Luxembourg, Hamburg, the Schubertiade Schwarzenberg and the Wigmore Hall.

On 11 November 2009 Bostridge sang Agnus Dei from Benjamin Britten's War Requiem, at the Armistice Day service in Westminster Abbey. This uses the words of war poet Wilfred Owen's "At a Calvary near the Ancre". The service marked the loss of the WWI generation, whose last members died earlier the same year. Bostridge performed Kurt Weill's anti-war Four Walt Whitman Songs in 2014. He also has a long history with directing and performing The Threepenny Opera.

In 2013, he performed as part of the Barbican Britten centenary festival in London, and released a new recording of the composer's War Requiem.

Bostridge was for a time the music columnist for Standpoint magazine, the monthly publication launched in 2008 "to celebrate Western civilisation" and served on the magazine's advisory board. He has been Prospect magazine's classical columnist since 2023. He is a Youth Music Ambassador, a patron of the Music Libraries Trust and of the Macmillan Cancer Support Guards Chapel Carol Concert.

A collection of his writings on music, A Singer's Notebook, was published by Faber and Faber in September 2011. It was described by philosopher Michael Tanner, in BBC Music Magazine: "A consistently lively, learned, urbane and passionate book, once opened not likely to be closed until you have read it all."

His bestselling book Schubert's Winter Journey: Anatomy of an Obsession was published by Faber and Faber in the UK and by Knopf in the US in January 2015. It has been published in German, Finnish, Dutch, Korean, Japanese, Italian, Swedish, Polish, Mandarin, simplified Chinese, Mandarin, French, Russian, and Spanish editions. It won the Duff Cooper Prize for non-fiction for 2015, the Prix Littéraire des Musiciens in 2018 and was named the best music book of the year in the Prix de la Critique 2017/18 (Association Professionelle de la Critique de Théâtre, Musique et Danse). It went on to win the Grand Prix France Musique des Muses in 2019.

In 2023 he sang the Evangelist role in a performance of J. S. Bach's St. Matthew Passion with the French ensemble Les Talens Lyriques and the Chœur de chambre de Namur conducted by Christophe Rousset, and also gave concerts of Shakespeare's songs.

His book Song and Self: A Singer’s Reflections on Music and Performance was published in 2023 by Chicago University Press in the US, Faber and Faber in the UK and C.H Beck in Germany (das Lied und das Ich); and will be published by Acantilado in Spain, Il Saggiatore in Italy and Artes in Japan.

== Personal life ==
In 1992, Bostridge married the writer and publisher Lucasta Miller, and they have a son and a daughter.

He lists his hobbies as reading, cooking, and looking at pictures. He is a member of the Garrick Club.

== Bibliography ==
=== Books ===
- Witchcraft and its Transformations, c.1650–1750. Oxford: Clarendon Press. 1997.
- A Singer's Notebook. Faber and Faber. 2011. ISBN 978-0-571-2524-59.
- Schubert's Winter Journey: Anatomy of an Obsession. Faber and Faber. 2014. ISBN 978-0571282807.
- Song and Self: A Singer's Reflections on Music and Performance. Chicago University Press/Faber and Faber 2023

=== Book reviews ===
Year	Review article	Work(s) reviewed
2018	Bostridge, Ian (22 February 2018). "God's own music". The New York Review of Books. 65 (3): 16–18.	Gant, Andrew. O sing unto the Lord : a history of English church music. Chicago: University of Chicago Press.; Keates, Jonathan. Messiah : the composition and afterlife of Handel's masterpiece. Basic Books.

=== Critical studies and reviews of Bostridge's work ===
- Monter, William (June 1999). "[Untitled review]". Book Reviews. Journal of Modern History. 71 (2): 445–447. doi:10.1086/235253. S2CID 222436282. Reviews Witchcraft and its transformations, c.1650–1750.

== Select discography ==
- Twilight Schumann Songs with Saskia Giorgini (Pentatone 2025)
- Mustonen, Symphony no 3, Taivaanvalot, Turku Philharmonic, Olli Mustonen (Ondine 2024)
- The Folly of Desire with Brad Mehldau (Pentatone 2023)
- Schubert: Schwanengesang with Lars Vogt (Pentatone 2022)
- Tormento d'Amore with Antonio Florio and Cappella Neapolitana (Warner 2022)
- Respighi, Songs with Saskia Giorgini (Pentatone 2021)
- Schubert, Die schöne Müllerin with Saskia Giorgini (Pentatone 2020)
- Beethoven: Songs and Folksongs with Antonio Pappano (Warner Classics 2020)
- Schubert, Winterreise with Thomas Adès (Pentatone 2019)
- Handel, Ode for St Cecilia's Day with Dunedin Consort (Linn 2019)
- Berlioz, "Les Nuits d'Eté"; Ravel, "Shéhérazade"; Debussy/Adams, "Le Livre de Baudelaire", conducted by Ludovic Morlot with Seattle Symphony, (Seattle Symphony Media, 2019)
- Requiem (Butterworth, Stephan, Mahler, Weill) with Antonio Pappano (Warner Classics 2018)
- Schubert Songs 4 with Julius Drake (Wigmore Live 2018)
- Schubert Songs 3 with Julius Drake (Wigmore Live 2017)
- Songs from Our Ancestors with Xuefei Yang (Globe Music, 2016)
- Shakespeare Songs with Antonio Pappano (Warner Classics, 2016)
- Brahms: the complete songs, volume 6 with Graham Johnson (Hyperion, 2015)
- Schubert Songs 2 with Julius Drake (Wigmore Live, 2015)
- Schubert Songs 1 with Julius Drake (Wigmore Live, 2014)
- Bach: St John Passion with Stephen Layton, Polyphony and the OAE (Hyperion, 2013)
- Britten: War Requiem" with Antonio Pappano, Anna Netrebko, Thomas Hampson, Accademia di Santa Cecilia (Warner Classics, 2013)
- Britten: The Rape of Lucretia with Oliver Knussen (EMI Classics, 2013)
- Britten Songs with Antonio Pappano and Xuefei Yang (EMI Classics, 2013)
- Three Baroque Tenors Arias for Beard, Borosini and Fabri. Bernard Labadie (EMI Classics 2010)
- Adès: The Tempest with Thomas Adès (EMI Classics, 2009)
- Schubert: Schwanengesang with Antonio Pappano (EMI Classics, 2009)
- Schubert: The Wanderer: Lieder and Fragments with Leif Ove Andsnes (EMI Classics, 2008)
- Great Handel with Harry Bicket (EMI Classics, 2007)
- Schubert: Lieder and Sonata with Leif Ove Andsnes (EMI Classics, 2007)
- Wolf: Lieder with Antonio Pappano (EMI Classics, 2006)
- Britten: Les Illuminations, Serenade, Nocturne with Simon Rattle (EMI Classics, 2005)
- Schubert: 25 Lieder with Julius Drake (EMI Classics, 2005)
- Wagner: Tristan und Isolde with Antonio Pappano (EMI Classics, 2005)
- Schubert: die Schöne Müllerin with Mitsuko Uchida (EMI Classics, 2005)
- Schubert: Lieder and Sonata No.21 with Leif Ove Andsnes (EMI Classics, 2005)
- Schubert: Winterreise with Leif Ove Andsnes (EMI Classics, 2004)
- Monteverdi: Orfeo with Emmanuelle Haïm (Virgin Classics, 2004)
- Purcell: Dido and Aeneas with Emmanuelle Haïm (Virgin Classics, 2003)
- Vaughan Williams: On Wenlock Edge with Bernard Haitink (EMI Classics, 2003)
- Schubert: Lieder and Sonata D850 with Leif Ove Andsnes (EMI Classics, 2003)
- Mozart: Idomeneo with Charles Mackerras (EMI Classics, 2002)
- Britten: Canticles & Folksongs with Julius Drake (Virgin Classics, 2002)
- Britten: The Turn of the Screw with Daniel Harding (Virgin Classics, 2002)
- The Songs of Robert Schumann, Vol.7 with Dorothea Röschmann and Graham Johnson (Hyperion, 2002)
- The Noël Coward Songbook with Jeffrey Tate (EMI Classics, 2002)
- Schubert: Lieder volume II with Julius Drake (EMI Classics, 2001)
- Henze: Songs with Julius Drake (EMI Classics, 2001)
- Bach: Cantatas and Arias with Fabio Biondi (Virgin Classics, 2000)
- Handel: L'allegro, il penseroso ed il moderato with John Nelson (Virgin Classics, 2000)
- The English Songbook with Julius Drake (EMI Classics, 1999)
- Stravinsky: The Rake's Progress with John Eliot Gardiner (Deutsche Grammophon, 1999)
- Bach: St Matthew Passion (Evangelist) with Philippe Herreweghe (Harmonia Mundi, 1999)
- Schumann: Liederkreis & Dichterliebe etc. with Julius Drake (EMI Classics, 1998)
- Schubert: Lieder volume I with Julius Drake (EMI Classics, 1998)
- Britten: Our Hunting Fathers with Daniel Harding, Britten Sinfonia (Warner Classics, 1998)
- Schubert: Die schöne Müllerin (Schubert Edition, Vol.25) with Graham Johnson and Dietrich Fischer-Dieskau (Hyperion, 1996)
- Britten: The Red Cockatoo & Other Songs with Graham Johnson (Hyperion, 1995)
- Nyman: Noises, Sounds & Sweet Airs with Dominique Debart (Argo, 1995)
- Vaughan Williams: Over Hill, Over Dale with Holst Singers and Michael George (Hyperion, 1995)
