= Freisinn (Goethe) =

Poem by Goethe

- by Johann Wolfgang von Goethe
- Written: 1815
- First published in: West–östlicher Divan
- Language: German
- Publication date: 1819

"Freisinn" (free spirit, free mind) is a poem written by Johann Wolfgang von Goethe in 1815, first published in West-Eastern Divan in 1819.

== Composition ==
A reading of Freisinn from the Ingush documentary "Papakha Ingusha. Abrek Sulumbek" (2019)

The first verse is inspired by the dictum of a free-spirited Ghalghai (Ingush) highlander, who, by the account of Moritz von Engelhardt in 1811, rejected the proposition of subservience to the rule of the Tsar, with a short phrase: "Above my hat are only the stars". The second verse is derived from a passage from the Quran.

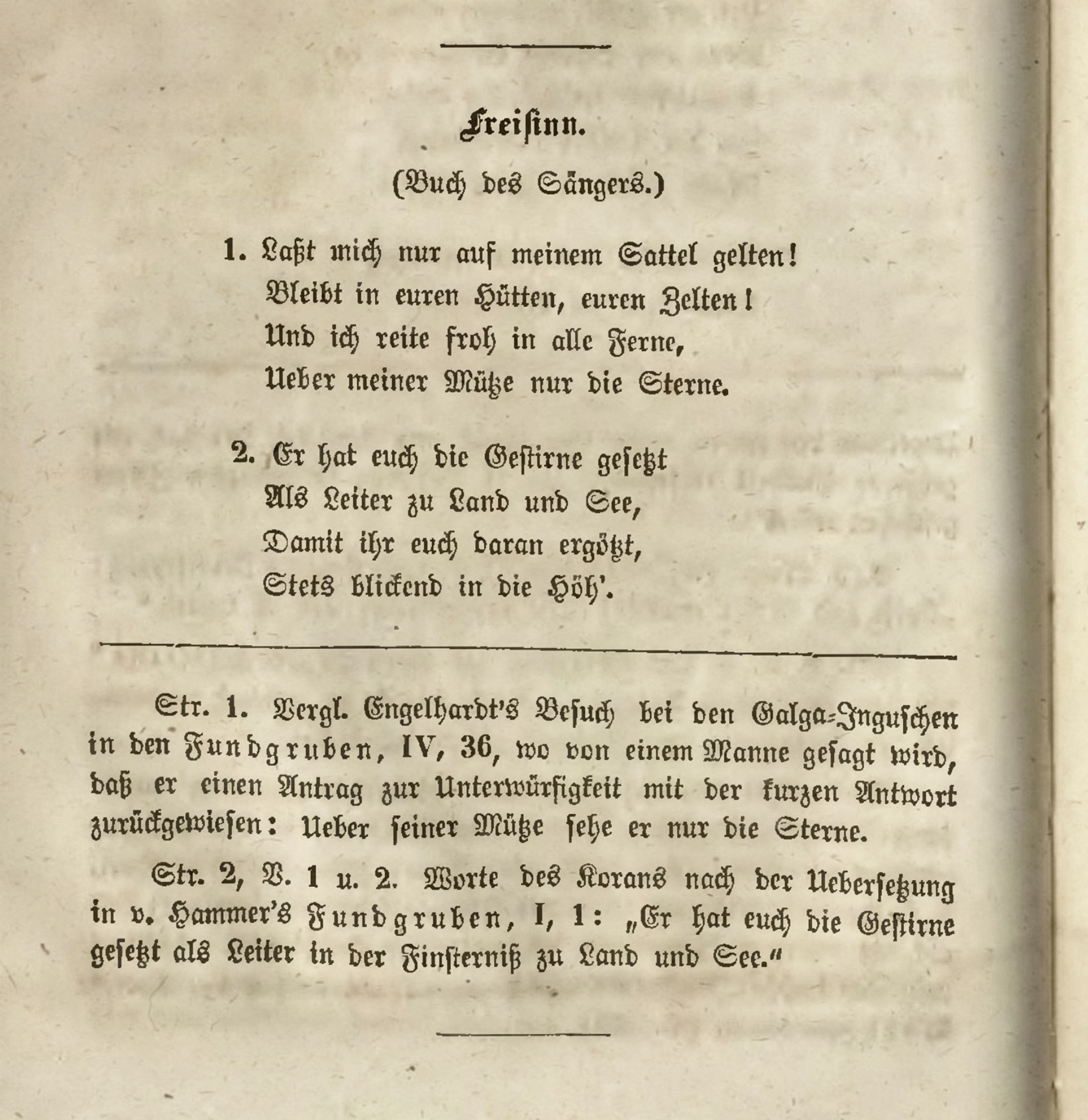

Let me hold sway in my saddle!
Stay in your huts, tents!
And I ride happily into the distance,
Above my hat are only the stars.

He has set the constellations
To guide you over land and sea,
That you may delight in them,
As you gaze forever aloft.

== Publications ==
The first German researcher to reveal the connection between the Ingush man's phrase and the poem was Christian Friedrich Wurm in his Commentary on Göthe's West-Eastern Diwan. This would later on be confirmed in the works of Joseph Kürschner, Dieter Borchmeyer and Martin Mosebach.

The following excerpt was published in the Neue Speyerer Zeitung on 11 July 1820:

A free Ingush in the Caucasus, who was told of the benefits he could receive if he went under the rule of the Russian Tsar, encouraged by his independence, proudly, boldly, and truly, replied:

"How can I accept this? Above my hat, I see nothing but a blue, starry sky."

Neither Pope Gregory VII at Canossa, nor the Emperor Napoleon at Jena, could say so surely. Although their hats are bigger than that of the Ingush; but their hearts – not likely.

== Music ==
R. Schumann's composition of Freisinn. Performed by M. Guadagnini.

On the eve of his wedding in 1840, Robert Schumann presented his wife-to-be Clara with a deluxe edition of Myrthen, a newly composed cycle of 26 songs adorned on the cover with green myrtles, the German symbol of marriage, with "Freisinn" listed as the second composition in this series.
