= Bettina Gaus =

German journalist (1956–2021)

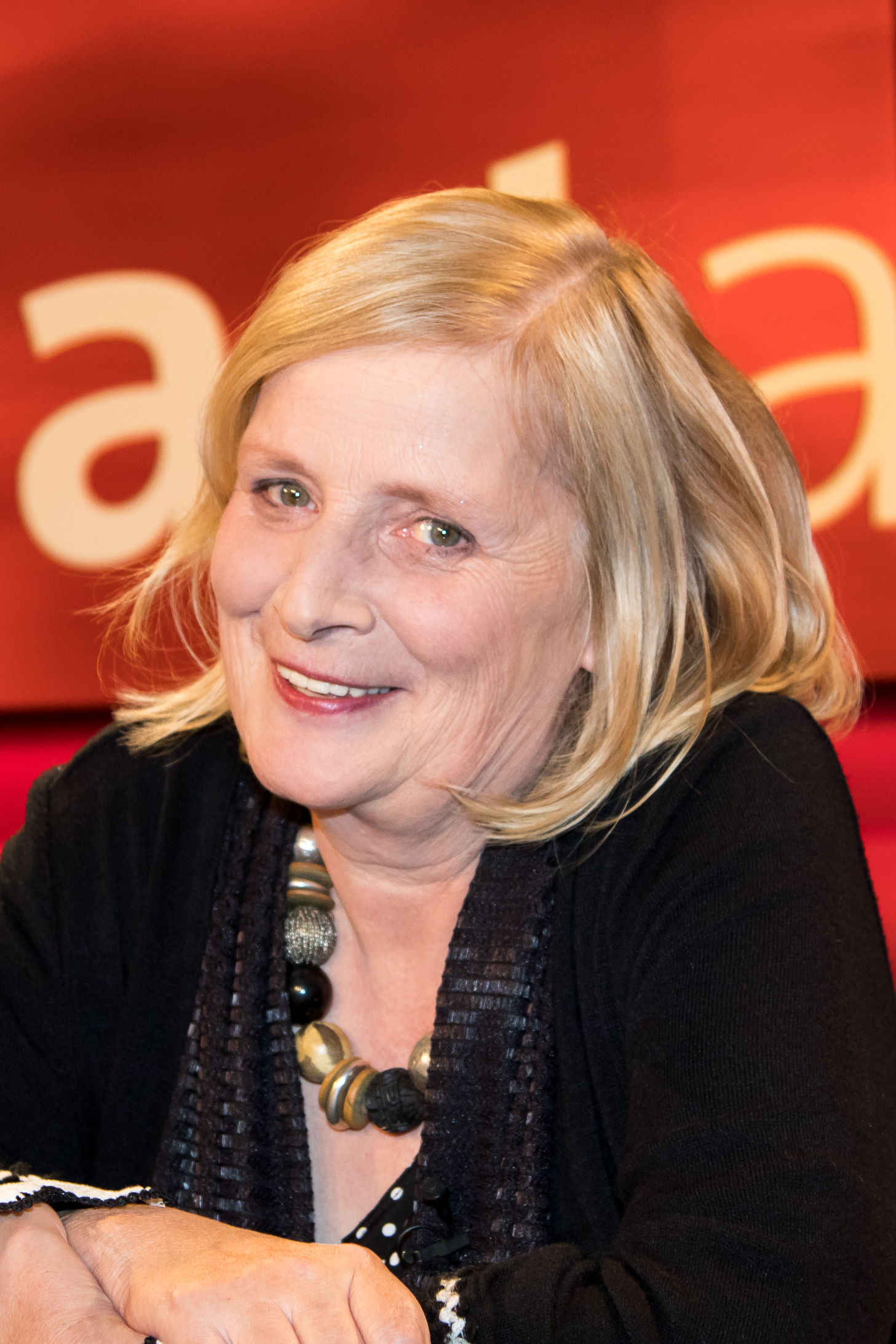
- Gaus in 2016
- Born: 5 December 1956; Munich, West Germany
- Died: 27 October 2021 (aged 64); Berlin, Germany

Bettina Gaus (5 December 1956 – 27 October 2021) was a German journalist.

== Life ==
Gaus was born in Munich in December 1956, the daughter of Erika Gaus and publicist and diplomat Günter Gaus. She attended the Deutsche Journalistenschule in Munich and studied political science at the Ludwig-Maximilians-Universität München there. In 1979 she completed an internship at the Hamburger Morgenpost, after which she worked for the Munich Abendzeitung, among others. From 1983 to 1989 she was political editor at the German-language program of Deutsche Welle. From 1989 to 1996, she reported out of Nairobi on Africa topics for the tageszeitung (taz), ARD stations and news agencies. From 1996 to 1999 Gaus headed the parliamentary office of the taz, since then she had been the political correspondent of the newspaper until 2021. Since 2021, she had been writing columns for the magazine Der Spiegel.

She died in Berlin on 27 October 2021, at the age of 64.

She leaves behind a daughter, Nora Mbagathi, born to Bettina Gaus and Stanley Mbagathi in Cologne in 1987.

== Publications ==
- Die scheinheilige Republik. Das Ende der demokratischen Streitkultur. DVA, Stuttgart/München 2000, ISBN 3-421-05336-7, aktualisierte Ausgabe: dtv, München 2002, ISBN 3-423-36277-4.
- Frontberichte. Die Macht der Medien in Zeiten des Krieges. Campus, Frankfurt/New York 2004, ISBN 3-593-37543-5.
- Auf der Suche nach Amerika. Begegnungen mit einem fremden Land. Eichborn, Frankfurt 2008, ISBN 978-3-8218-5701-5.
- Der unterschätzte Kontinent. Reise zur Mittelschicht Afrikas. Eichborn, Frankfurt 2011, ISBN 978-3-8218-6517-1.
