= Michel Dalberto =

French pianist (born 1955)

Michel Dalberto (born 2 June 1955) is a French concert pianist.

== Biography ==
Dalberto was born in Paris into a non-musical family. He began studying the piano at the age of three and a half. When he was twelve, he was introduced to Vlado Perlemuter (a favourite pupil of Alfred Cortot), and entered his class at the Paris Conservatoire in 1969 where he completed his studies over a period of nine years.

Michel Dalberto first came to prominence winning the Clara Haskil Prize in 1975. Three years later he won First Prize in the Leeds International Piano Competition.

From 1990 until 2005, Michel Dalberto was Artistic Adviser of Les Arcs Academy-Festival in Bourg-Saint-Maurice, Savoie. Between 1991 and 2009, he served as Chairman of the Jury of the Clara Haskil International Piano Competition. In May 2011, he was appointed Professor at the Paris Conservatoire.

Michel Dalberto was awarded the Knight of the Ordre National du Mérite by the French Government in 1996.

== Recordings ==
Dalberto's first recording – two piano sonatas by Schubert – was awarded the Grand Prize of the Academy Charles Cros. He has recorded the complete piano works of Schubert (14 CDs on Denon). Among other recordings are the Grieg Concerto in A minor and Richard Strauss Burleske in D minor with the London Philharmonia and Jean-Bernard Pommier, a "live" recording of the Schumann Concerto at the Vienna Festival with the Wiener Symphoniker and Eliahu Inbal, songs by Chausson with Jessye Norman and two recitals with Barbara Hendricks. Since 1997, he has recorded for the RCA Red Seal label the 1st Book of Preludes and Images by Debussy and Mozart Concerti n°20 and 22 with the Ensemble Orchestral de Paris and John Nelson. In June 2004, RCA Red Seal released a programme of Paraphrases by Liszt on Verdi and Wagner's operas.

== Discography ==
- "Capucon Septet" CD (2004)
- "Chausson: Poème De L'Amour Et De La Mer; Chanson Perpétuelle; Mélodies", CD (2003)
- "Debussy: Greatest Hits" CD (2001)
- "Very Best of Barbara Hendricks" CDs (2005)
- "Ultimate Most Relaxing Classical Piano Music in the Universe" CDs (2007)
- "Romantic Piano Classical Music For Intimate Romantic Piano: Classical Music For Intimate Moments" CD (2008)
- "F Schubert Simply Schubert" CDs (2008)
- "Simply Schumann" CDs (2008)
- "Best Romantic Classics 100" CDs (2008)
- "100 Best Romantic Classics" CDs (2008)
- Dalberto "Schumann: Myrthen; Gedichte Der Königin Maria Stuart" CD (2008)
- "Ernest Chausson: Poème De L'Amour Et De La Mer; Chanson Perpétuelle; Mélodies" CD (2008)
- "100 Best Encores Best Encores 100" CDs (2009)
- "César Franck: Piano Works and Quintet" with Novus Quartet CD (2018)
- "Franz Liszt: Années de pèlerinage, Book 2 (Italy) Denon CD (1993)
