= David Alden =

Stage and film director

David Alden (born September 16, 1949 in New York City) is a prolific theater and film director known for his post-modernist settings of opera. He is the twin brother of Christopher Alden, also an opera director in the revisionist mold. The two brothers have covered much of the same repertoire in their long careers, but whereas Christopher's operatic settings place greater emphasis on his characters' emotional range, David's protagonists are more broadly caricatured and his productions far more politically charged. Another distinguishing feature between them is that David has been more active in Europe throughout his career, having enjoyed a particularly close creative partnership with Sir Peter Jonas for more than two decades, at both the English National Opera and the Bavarian State Opera.

== Early life ==
David Alden and his identical twin Christopher were born into a show business family closely tied to Broadway. Their father was the playwright Jerome Alden, and their mother was the ballerina Barbara Gaye, who danced in the original productions of On the Town and Annie Get Your Gun with Ethel Merman. As eight-year-olds, they listened at home to recordings of Gilbert & Sullivan operettas, and as teenagers in the mid-'60s, they frequently bought standing room tickets at the Metropolitan Opera. By age 13, both had decided they wanted to direct opera.

David studied at the University of Pennsylvania and like his brother, launched his directing career with Opera Omaha in the 1970s. In 1976, he visited Europe where he immersed himself in the cultural stream of contemporary opera directors the likes of Giorgio Strehler, Harry Kupfer, Hans Neuenfels and Ruth Berghaus. Theirs was a generation of direct heirs to the Expressionist movement and, in particular, to Bertolt Brecht. For Alden, the exposure was a revelation that unlocked intense passions he had long wanted to express in musical theater. His first European production in the late ‘70s was a Rigoletto for Scottish Opera that, he says, was assailed by the critics because "in England, it was still very early to speak directly to the audience with the style I was attempting and place passion and schizophrenia on the stage."

In 1980, Alden was tapped by the Metropolitan Opera to replace the late Herbert Graf in its restaging of Wozzeck as well as the revivals in 1985 and 1988. As John Rockwell noted in The New York Times, "Alden's staging… (is) indebted to Expressionist films like The Cabinet of Dr. Caligari, full of stark silhouettes and lurching zombies."

== Powerhouse years at English National Opera ==
In 1984, Peter Jonas — formerly artistic director of the Chicago Symphony Orchestra — was named to succeed the Earl of Harewood as general director of English National Opera. Together with music director Mark Elder and stage director David Pountney, they became the ruling "Power House" triumvirate that re-invigorated the artistic direction of ENO with a series of modernist interpretations of classic operas as well as productions of newly commissioned operas. That year, David Alden staged a controversial ENO production of Tchaikovsky's Mazeppa that became emblematic of the new era. At the end of Act II when the hero Kochubey and his friend Iskra are dragged to the executioner's block, Alden shocked his audience with a gruesome chainsaw massacre that set the tone for the bloody mad scene in Act III and forever enshrined his production in the minds of London opera goers as "the Chainsaw Mazeppa" that "became a sort of shorthand for the entire Jonas project — brutal, uncompromising, unmissable, the ultimate succès de scandale." Neither Mazeppa nor Simon Boccanegra, Ballo in Maschera - or any of the other power house productions have been preserved on videotape.

Over the next decade, Alden continued in his role as provocateur and key collaborator of the ENO Power House with Giuseppe Verdi's Simon Boccanegra and Un ballo in maschera, George Frideric Handel's Ariodante, Hector Berlioz' La Damnation de Faust, Richard Wagner's Tristan und Isolde and more recently, a 2006 production of Leoš Janáček's Jenůfa that won an Olivier Award for Best New Opera Production.

== Bavarian State Opera ==
In 1993, Peter Jonas became intendant of the Bavarian State Opera, and from then to his departure in 2006, he made David Alden productions a mainstay of his tenure. Those included a Handel series with Ariodante, Orlando, Rinaldo and Rodelinda; Claudio Monteverdi's L'incoronazione di Poppea and Il ritorno d'Ulisse in patria; Richard Wagner's Tannhäuser and Der Ring des Nibelungen; Francesco Cavalli's La Calisto, Verdi's La forza del destino, Tchaikovsky's The Queen of Spades and Alban Berg's Lulu.

At the 2006 Munich Opera Festival, the Staatsoper made the extraordinary gesture of reviving eight of those productions to celebrate its association with Alden. In addition, he was awarded a special Bavarian Theater Prize for Individual Artistic Achievement in recognition of his artistic contributions to the Bavarian State Opera.

== Directing career in Europe and the U.S. ==
In Europe, Alden has also produced operas for Welsh National Opera, Vienna Volksoper and Komische Oper Berlin. He staged a new production of Thomas Adès' Powder Her Face for the Aldeburgh Festival and has mounted operas in Cologne, Frankfurt, Antwerp and Graz. In 1995 he directed in Tel Aviv the world première of Josef Tal's Joseph – a Kafkaesque story about modern society's norms and illusions.

In 2009 Alden directed Francesco Cavalli's Ercole Amante for the Dutch National Opera in Amsterdam (De Nederlandse Opera) to much critical acclaim and is returning with the same artistic team to stage Händel's 'Deidamia' in which will premiere March 15, 2012.

Alden's collaborations with American companies include operas for Lyric Opera of Chicago, Metropolitan Opera, Houston Grand Opera and the Spoleto Festival USA. He created the American premieres of Siegfried Matthus' Judith for Santa Fe Opera and Karol Szymanowski's King Roger for Long Beach Opera, a production so deconstructionist that the reviewer for The New York Times reported "the opera still awaits a true American premiere." In 1990, he mounted the world premiere of William Bolcom's cabaret opera Casino Paradise at the American Music Theater Festival in Philadelphia, and in 1992, he co-directed — with his brother Christopher — the three Mozart/Da Ponte operas in a production for the Chicago Symphony Orchestra led by Daniel Barenboim.

For film and television, Alden has directed Franz Schubert's Die Winterreise with Ian Bostridge and Julius Drake, Kurt Weill's Die sieben Todsünden and a documentary on the life of Verdi for BBC Television. Several of his stage productions have been filmed for wider video release.

== Opera as political theater ==
David Alden's opera settings are known for their expression of rage at the human condition. He has also been in the forefront of presenting opera as a running commentary on current or near current historical and political affairs. His 1988 production of Berg's Wozzeck for Los Angeles Opera was recast as a Vietnam era tale of moral corruption where "Wozzeck and his cronies are Green Berets packing machetes and M-16s", where "the Captain is a cigar-chomping skinhead in backpack and fatigues" and in whose "dreamlike escapes from reality... Wozzeck comes home to his girlfriend Marie after a hard day of defoliating forests and hunting Viet Cong. Clearly, Alden's apocalypse is here and now."

His first production of Richard Strauss' Salome in 2006, presented in Lithuania, eschewed the biblical timeframe of Oscar Wilde's original for a more contemporary, Soviet era setting exposing "fifty years of occupation, suppression and persecution" with Herod portrayed as a debauched "dictator who senses the approach of the end of his regime."

And though Alden's Munich staging of Rinaldo in 2000 pre-dated September 11 and George W. Bush's Iraq War, he had the timely insight to move the opera's action from the medieval Crusader era of Torquato Tasso's Gerusalemme liberata to the modern day Middle East and to "[make] it something of an American Radical Religious Right Crusade...[putting] a self-promoting contemporary Protestant Christian Evangelist center stage."
