= Günter Gaus =

German journalist, politician and diplomat (1929–2004)

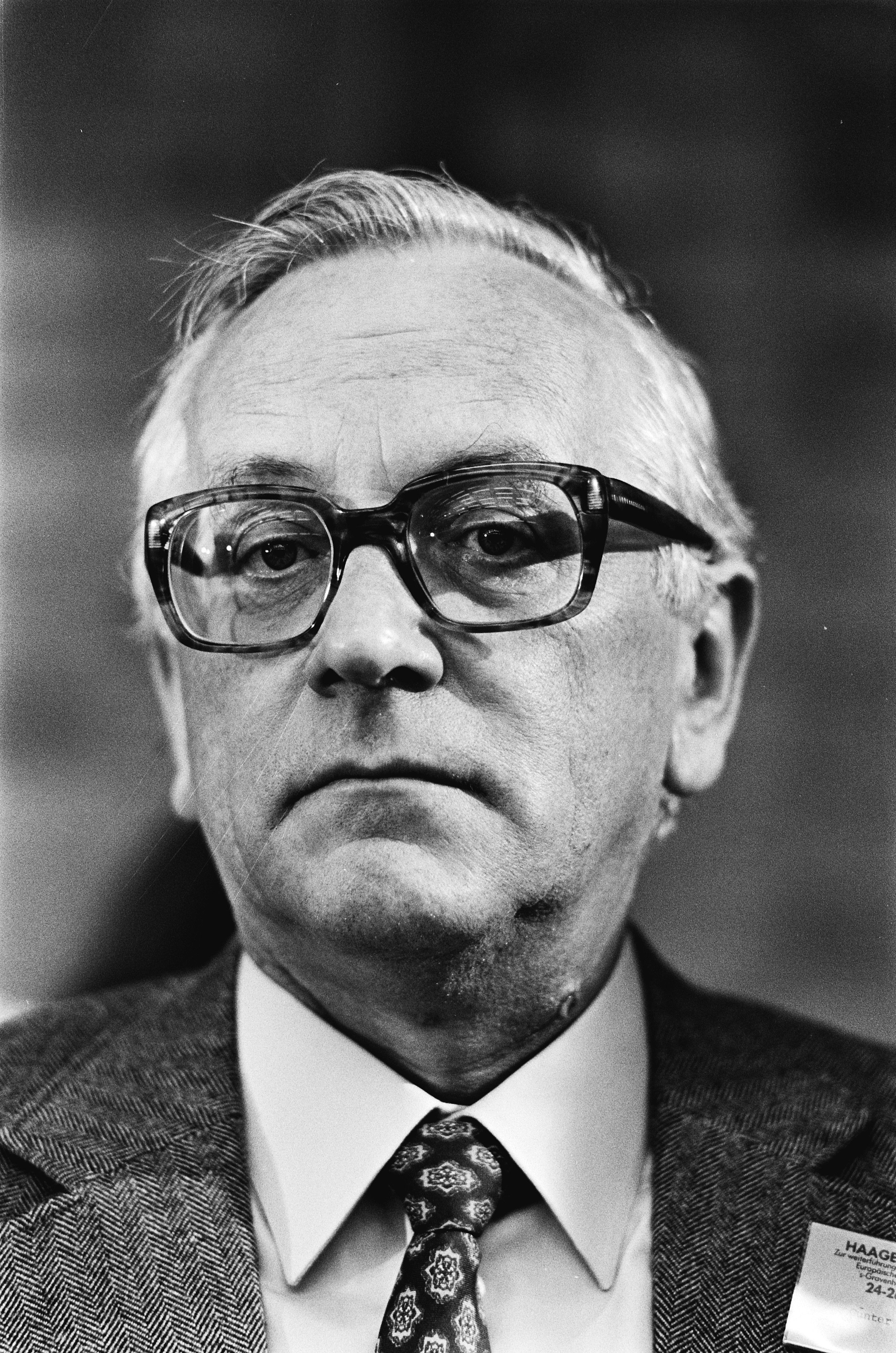
- Gaus in 1982
- Born: Günter Kurt Willi Gaus; 23 November 1929; Braunschweig (Freistaat Braunschweig), Germany
- Died: 14 May 2004 (aged 74); Altona (Hamburg), Germany
- Education: Ludwig-Maximilians-Universität München
- Occupations: Political journalist Commentator; Television interviewer Diplomat "Government fixer"
- Political party: SPD (1976–2001)
- Spouse: Erika Butzengeiger
- Children: Bettina Gaus, journalist
- Parent(s): Willi & Hedwig Gaus

Günter Gaus (23 November 1929 – 14 May 2004) was a prominent German journalist-commentator who became a diplomat and (very briefly) a regional politician in Berlin. Once he had moved on – as he probably assumed, permanently – from the worlds of print journalism and television, in 1976 Günter Gaus joined the Social Democratic Party. The party's leader (and former chancellor), Willy Brandt, was a close political ally and a friend. Gaus let it be known that he had resigned his party membership towards the end of 2001, after Chancellor Schröder had incautiously – and "without consulting the party" – pledged "unconditional/unlimited solidarity" ("bedingungslose/uneingeschränkte Solidarität") with the United States of America during the build-up to that year's United States invasion of Afghanistan.

== Life ==
=== Provenance and early years ===
Gaus was born and grew up in Braunschweig where his parents, Willi and Hedwig Gaus, owned and ran a successful fruit and vegetable retail business. Alongside the conventional greengrocer merchandise there was a complementary specialist section with a focus on exotic fruits. Many years later his journalist daughter would tell an interviewer that wartime experiences of innumerable nights spent in bomb shelters and, in particular, of the destructive English air attack of 15 October 1944, would have a lasting impact on the child. Gaus was born a couple of months too early to avoid more active participation in a war. Shortly before it ended he was sent for two weeks as part of a large schoolboy contingent to the Netherlands "to dig trenches" (intended, it would appear, to serve as "tank traps"). He was then assigned to walk the streets of his home town and the surrounding countryside in the company of other equally bemused reluctant soldiers "equipped with anti-tank weaponry and pistols". He nevertheless avoided any more personal "enemy encounters".

=== School years and war ===
May 1945 saw a return to peace and the start of a period of military occupation. Magdeburg, a short distance to the east, was administered as part of the Soviet occupation zone (relaunched in 1949 as the German Democratic Republic / East Germany) but Braunschweig found itself under British occupation. Günter Gaus was able to complete his schooling close to his parents' home at the confusingly named "Gymnasium Gaussschule" (secondary school). (Note: In defiance of recent attempts to rebrand it, the school is still named after Carl Friedrich Gauß: there is no reason beside the similarity of their family names to infer any kinship connection between Carl Friedrich Gauß (1777–1855) and Günter Gaus (1929–2004).) In 1947 he became editor-in-chief of "Der Punkt", one of the first "schoolboy newspapers" in post-war Germany. He then found time, in 1949, to pass his Abitur thereby opening the way to university admission. Gaus had already resolved to become a journalist, and before progressing to university he undertook what amounted to an informal internship with the Braunschweiger Zeitung.

=== Student years ===
In 1950, he enrolled at the Ludwig-Maximilians-Universität München, where he studied Germanistics and History. Soon after his arrival he switched to a course in journalism. His own autobiography and other sources make little mention of his university career, beyond reporting that as a student he was already undertaking regular journalistic assignments, so that as soon as he had finished his time at the university, his transfer into full-time journalism was exceptionally seamless.

=== Journalism ===
"Being a journalist seems to be like a mixture from the wider world: something between an upmarket private investigator, a political divorce court judge and a Bohemian outsider."
(""Journalist zu sein erschien wie eine Mischung aus weiter Welt, gehobenem Privatdetektiv, Schiedsrichter der Politik und gemäßigter Bohème"")

Günter Gaus, quoted from his autobiography by Carina Werner

His first permanent appointment to an editorial office came just two years after his admission as a student to the Ludwig-Maximilians-Universität München. In 1952 he joined the Freiburg-based Badische Zeitung. He moved on after four years to the Deutsche Zeitung und Wirtschaftszeitung. During this period he came to the attention of the pioneering media magnate Rudolf Augstein who assiduously – and in the end successfully – sought to recruit him for a job as a political editor at Der Spiegel in Hamburg. Still not quite 29, Günter Gaus made the move to West Germany's leading centre-right political weekly in 1958. In the words of one admirer he turned Spiegel into the "Strafbataillon des deutschen Journalismus" (loosely, "punishment battalion of German journalism"). Although this appointment lasted only for three years, his association with Der Spiegel, together with his close personal and professional friendship with the publication's proprietor, would become lifelong. In 1961 he moved on again, this time joining Süddeutsche Zeitung which, despite its Munich base, is one of the few daily newspapers with a powerful reach throughout (and beyond) Germany. Gaus worked for Süddeutsche Zeitung as the newspaper's political editor between 1961 and 1965.

=== Marriage ===
During his time with Deutsche Zeitung und Wirtschaftszeitung, Gaus married Erika Butzengeiger at Munich in 1955. A couple of years younger than her husband, Erika Gaus is a daughter of the former bank manager, Karl Butzengeiger. She succeeded in keeping out of the limelight that frequently surrounded her husband. The couple's daughter, Bettina Gaus, was born towards the end of 1956 and has followed her father into a career as a high-profile political journalist.

=== Television ===
On 10 April 1963, the German public television broadcaster ZDF transmitted the first episode of the series called "Zur Person – Porträts in Frage und Antwort". To paraphrase a later tribute from Rudolf Augstein, the show quickly became the medium whereby Günter Gaus launched himself on a completely new and very public career as a television interviewer, and before there were even talk shows (at least in Germany). The programmes were described in the series title as "portraits in questions and answers". Each programme was devoted to a single individual. The interviewee of the launch episode was Ludwig Erhard, the minister for economic affairs, who later became chancellor, widely celebrated by his admirers as an author of West Germany's post-war "economic miracle". By the time the series came to an end, Gaus had interviewed more than 250 personalities, many from the world of politics, though representatives of the arts and philosophy were also enticed into the studios. Aside from Erhard, some of the programme's best remembered subjects were Franz Josef Strauss, Christian Klar, Hannah Arendt, and Rudi Dutschke. Many of the interviews are remembered as classics of their kind, and repeats of them still run on German television more than fifty years later. The design of the television studios was deliberately minimalist, with nothing visible except a dark background, behind two armchairs containing two people. The focus was on the interviewee. When Gaus was seen at all, it was generally only from behind, so that he acquired the oft-repeated soubriquet "Germany's best-known back of the head". He also quickly acquired a reputation as a remarkable television interviewer. His questions were sharp and analytical: not infrequently they seemed disarmingly naive. One reviewer wrote: "After almost every interview, you really have the feeling of now knowing a person better about whom you previously only knew this and that: just as if you had read a detailed biography." (Note: "Tatsächlich hat man nach beinahe jedem Gespräch das Gefühl, eine Person, von der man dieses und jenes wusste, nun mehr zu kennen; ganz so, als habe man eine differenzierte Biografie gelesen.")

Gaus was employed as director of television and radio programming with the Südwestfunk between 1965 and 1968. He did not abandon journalism completely, however. In an article he wrote at this time for the conservative weekly Christ und Welt he offered the judgement that Helmut Kohl, at that time a youthful but conspicuously ambitious leader of the centre-right CDU (party) in the regional parliament at Mainz, looked like a man who might one day make it to the chancellorship. His prescience did not go unnoticed. A few years later Hannelore Kohl, who had evidently noticed the effect the article had on her husband, and who in the opinion of most commentators never relished the possibility of becoming the wife of a German chancellor, accosted Gaus with a three word accusation, "Sie sind schuld" ("It's your fault").

=== Return to Der Spiegel ===
During the mid-1960s he produced a number of well-received books on the political situation in West Germany at that time; and in 1969, having successfully persuaded him back to Der Spiegel, Rudolf Augstein installed Günter Gaus as editor-in-chief. Despite having no party membership or acknowledged party loyalties, over the next few years Gaus used the avenues available to him – principally but not solely through Der Spiegel – to turn himself into one of the most influential media backers of Chancellor Brandt's still contentious pursuit of normalised relations between East and West Germany (known to historians and others as Willy Brandt's "Ostpolitik").

=== Permanent representative of the West German government in East Berlin ===
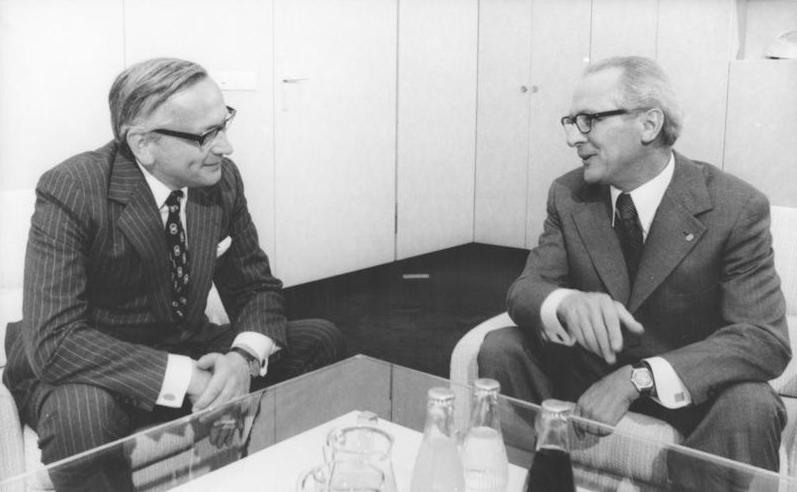
Günter Gaus in discussion with Erich Honecker September 1974

In 1973 Gaus made an abrupt switch to a form of politics, accepting a post as Secretary of state in the Chancellor's Office. The chancellor's intention was that Gaus should take on a quasi-diplomatic role in respect of the intensively political issues surrounding Intra-German relations. Everything involved in relations between West Germany and East Germany was complicated by the fact that legally – and in the eyes of conservatives on both sides of the divide, politically – there was no mutual recognition between the two "states". There could be no question of appointing an ambassador or even a conventional "chargé d'affaires" to a country that did not, under West German law, exist as a separate entity. Contemporary and subsequent sources tend to describe the posting as something along the lines "the first head of the permanent representation of the Federal Republic of Germany in the German Democratic Republic". Appropriate changes to the (West) German constitutional "Basic law", following laborious negotiations, entered into legal force for most purposes at the end of 1973. On 2 May 1974 West Germany's "Permanent Representation" office opened at Hannoversche Straße 28–30 in East Berlin under the direction of Günter Gaus. He retained the posting till 1981, despite the resignation from the chancellorship of Willy Brandt at around the same time as the mission was opened. Gaus' relationship with Brandt's successor as chancellor, Helmut Schmidt, was never a particularly easy one.

The frequently prickly relationship with Chancellor Schmidt was not allowed, by either man, to cramp the effectiveness of Günter Gaus in his job. His central duties involved taking the leading role in an endless succession of negotiations. He turned out to be exceptionally well suited for that work, with a talent for listening deeply, shrewd political insight, and a genuine empathy for the achievements in the "German Democratic Republic" of a Leninist government structure which, for all its acknowledged brutishness and economic naïveté, had engendered an absence of social hierarchies and a form of social solidarity between citizens that were conspicuously absent in the west. In retirement, looking back on his career, Gaus would insistently identify his seven years as an unconventional diplomat in East Berlin, as the most important time in his whole life. It was also "the most fascinating job that he ever had, or could have wished on himself". He chalked up 17 important agreements between the governments in Bonn and East Berlin, including the one that led to the resumption of work on building a (more modern version of) the Autobahn connecting West Berlin with Hamburg (which had been formally suspended in 1941) and another providing for important upgrades to the Teltow Canal. There was also a more wide-ranging agreement on facilitating transit through East Germany between West Germany and West Berlin. A particular visible aspect of this agreement came in October 1979 with the abolition of road tolls for motorists undertaking the journey. The common feature of the agreements between the two Germany's concluded during the aftermath of Brandt's successful Ostpolitik strategy was money. The East German government, after years of paying for its elaborate surveillance and control strategies, together with other favoured projects, through the addiction of the party leadership to eye-watering levels of deficit financing, was far closer to financial collapse than western commentators or the East German public noticed at the time. In return for West German cash, a range of humanitarian and practical objectives were secured for Germans during the later 1970s.

The writer Christoph Hein has characterised Günter Gaus as "unbequem, unbeirrbar und integer" (loosely, "... an awkward, unflappable man of total integrity"), an assessment as relevant to his diplomatic dealings as to his broadcast television interviews of the previous decade. Through his work in East Berlin Gaus acquired, as virtually no one else from the west and very few in the east could have done, profound insights into East German life. In breach of the almost universal group-think shared between West German political elite during the 1970s and 1980s, he found himself in sympathy with aspects of the eastern "social" order that had emerged with the rest of the baggage in the legacies of Stalin and Ulbricht.

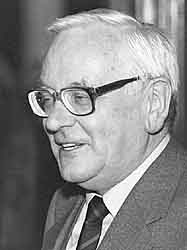
Günter Gaus 1994

The end, after not quite seven years, came to Gaus as a total surprise. Chancellor Schmidt had scheduled a visit to East Germany for the summer of 1981. Encounters between the leaders of the two Germanies were never easy. And according to Egon Bahr, who knew both Schmidt and Gaus extremely well, the working relationship between Schmidt and Gaus – two men each exceptionally confident in their own judgements and direct in the sharing of them – had never been exactly a matter of unbroken silken harmony ("...nicht gerade hinreißend und reibungslos"). It turned out that Schmidt was keen to avoid having to endure having Gaus at his side for his difficult meetings with the Honecker team on their home turf. Word came through during the spring of 1981 that Gaus was to be replaced as head of the Permanent Representation office in East Berlin. His replacement, it turned out, was to be Klaus Bölling, a man who had behind him, like Gaus, a long career at the interface between journalism and politics. One of several important differences, however, was that Bölling was a "Schmidt insider", just as Gaus had been a trusted Brandt lieutenant and effective backer during the early Ostpolitik years. According to his daughter, "those months of farewells [in East Berlin] were some of the saddest and most depressing of [her father's] life".

=== Books ===
Following the loss of his intra-German diplomatic posting, between February and June 1981 Günter Gaus served briefly as the West Berlin Senator for Sciences, Arts and Research in succession to his party colleague Peter Glotz. The post was an elective one, but the electorate in question, at that time, was restricted to the 160 members of the Berlin city parliament. However, the election results in the regional elections of February 1981 had deprived the SPD of an overall senate majority in West Berlin: in June 1981 the SPD Vogel senate was replaced by the (coalition-based) CDU-FDP Weizsäcker senate. Gaus returned to his former life as a respected political journalist-commentator. During the 1980s, in the words of one supportive commentator, "he wrote and wrote, determined to explain what the German Democratic Republic and 'Germany overall' were all about". His impact by now came not so much through newspaper contributions and interviews as through a number of well written and insightful political books. His central theme was the same as it always had been: Germany. He dissected contemporary developments in everything from intra-German relations to German security. Bettina Gaus writes: "My father had identified his life's theme, and it stayed with him till the end: the love for his own country – and the enduring worry as to where it was headed".

=== Reunification ===
In November 1989 the wall was breached by street protestors and then, piece by piece, disassembled by happy citizens through the night (and beyond). It quickly turned out that the Soviet troops watching had received no orders to intervene, while the number of the protesters rapidly increased, helped by a breathtaking piece of media mismanagement by the aging East German party leadership. (First Party Secretary Erich Honecker, terminally ill, had been forced by the speed of events on the streets and – unbeknown to the German public at the time – the politically fatal loss of Kremlin support, to resign the party leadership a few weeks earlier.) Günter Gaus was part of a generation that had seen an earlier attempt by East Germans to rid themselves of Soviet-sponsored tyranny end very differently, back in 1953. He greeted the end of the wall with massive delight that was completely unfeigned. Over the ensuing twelve months, however, he became progressively more horrified by the frenetic pace with which the western government of Helmut Kohl steam-rollered through a quasi-colonial reunificant process, committing what he viewed as a succession of serious and very basic political errors.

Like many others at the time, Gaus favoured a slower more iterative approach to unification than German government leaders. Gaus, in addition, carried a certain authority, born of long experience, coupled with the media access to share his reservations. Repeatedly, he warned that reunification should not be rushed. The serious and important business of unification must not be permitted to degenerate into a "public festival with a free beer supply" ("...Volksfest mit Freibierausschank"). Instead, he had his own vision, which he shared, for the establishment of a "Central European Confederation": this should comprise not just East and West Germany, but also Poland, Czechoslovakia and Hungary. (These last three were all undergoing their own versions of East Germany's successful and largely peaceful popular rejection of any further prolongation of domination by "Soviet Socialism"). Within a "Central European Confederation", the intra-German relationship could be expected to develop at its own speed. The vision might have been expected to stir residual folk memories of the pre-1806 Holy Roman empire, but that had collapsed nearly two centuries ago, and the Gaus blueprint for reunification gained very little traction with commentators. Meanwhile, the West German government in Bonn (and many of the newly promoted leaders in East Berlin) were simply determined to "get reunification done" as quickly as possible, for fear that the sweet "Winds of Glasnost" from Moscow or even the cautiously supportive mood music in Brussels and Washington might, at any moment, be changed.

=== Growing political detachment ===
In 1990 Gaus found a new voice, becoming a co-producer of the newly (re)launched left-wing political weekly Der Freitag. The publication's longer title included, during the early 1990s, a second line: "Die Ost-West-Wochenzeitung" ("The East-West weekly newspaper"), neatly summing up a principal preoccupation of Freitag's controlling minds. Between 1991 and 2004 he was a co-producer of "Blätter für deutsche und internationale Politik", during that period a serious minded Berlin-based monthly publication concentrating on German and international politics. In political terms, Günter Gaus felt he was becoming increasingly distanced from the mainstream following reunification, the manner of which he continued to deplore in print. He opposed what he saw as the casual militarisation of German foreign policy, and was deeply critical of Germany's participation in the Yugoslav Wars and the Iraq War during the 1990s. He also criticised the malign aspects of globalisation during the final years of the twentieth century, condemning so-called "natural law" justifications for the globalising market economy (Note: "... angeblichen Naturgesetz der globalisierten Marktwirtschaft ...") and the "licentious propensities of finance capital". (Note: "... Zügellosigkeit des Finanzkapitals ...") During the final decade of his life Günter Gaus, who had always been content to identify himself as a "Conservative Social Democrat", was disconcerted to find himself reacting to political developments as an unreformed political leftist. It was not, as he insisted, his own political compass that had moved, but society which had, "with breath-taking speed, tacked past [him] to the right". (Note: "Ich bin an den linken Rand gerutscht, was nicht daran liegt, dass ich mich verändert habe, sondern dass die Gesellschaft mit atemberaubender Geschwindigkeit rechts an mir vorbeigezogen ist.")

=== Death and tributes ===
The cancer diagnosis came through shortly after he had started work on his memoires. Günter Gaus died on 14 May 2004 at Reinbek, just outside Hamburg, where he and Erika had made their home together (subject to lengthy breaks for work-related assignments in Berlin) since 1969.

When the time came to lay his body to rest, however, it was taken for burial to the Dorotheenstadt Cemetery in central Berlin. The burial site had an added poignancy deriving from the fact that it was only a couple of streets away from the former West German "Permanent Representation" office over which he had presided, in what was at the time East Berlin, between 1974 and 1981. Tributes flowed in. His long-standing friend, the writer Christa Wolf, contributed a characteristically thoughtful obituary: "You have to use some old-fashioned words [for Gaus]: he was decent. He had moral courage. He had massive empathy, and was always ready to help people. Behind the scenes, he stood up for so many forgotten people. He was a person of great nobility".

"Widersprüche", the memoire on which Gaus had been working when he died, was published – still unfinished – at the end of 2004.

== Awards (selection) ==
- 1964: Adolf Grimme Prize in bronze for direction in "Zur Person: Gustaf Gründgens" (an episode in his much lauded ZDF TV interview series)
- 1965: Adolf Grimme Prize special press-jury recpgnition for direction in "Zur Person: Hannah Arendt" (an episode in his much lauded ZDF TV interview series)
- 1978: Great Cross of Merit Class I
- 1987: "The Political Book" prize from the Friedrich Ebert Foundation (The annual prize was inaugurated in 1982: since then has been awarded each 10 May – or as near thereto as possible – to commemorate the 1933 National Socialist book burnings.)
- 1988: Adolf Grimme special prize for substantive contributions to conversation-culture on television
- 1990: Critics' Prize
- 2001: Hanns Joachim Friedrichs Award for lifetime achievements
- 2002: Order of Merit of Berlin
- 2010: Grave of Günter Gaus declared "Grave of Honour of the State of Berlin"

== Output (selection) ==
- Bonn ohne Regierung? Kanzlerregiment und Opposition. Bericht, Analyse, Kritik. Piper, München 1965.
- Staatserhaltende Opposition oder hat die SPD kapituliert? Gespräche mit Herbert Wehner. Rowohlt, Reinbek bei Hamburg 1966.
- Gaus, Günter (1983). Wo Deutschland liegt : eine Ortsbestimmung (in German). Hamburg: Hoffmann und Campe. ISBN 3-455-08694-2. OCLC 10467684.
- Gaus, Günter (1984). Deutschland und die Nato 3 Reden (in German). Reinbek bei Hamburg. ISBN 978-3-499-15446-1. OCLC 251788957.
- Gaus, Günter (1986). Die Welt der Westdeutschen : kritische Betrachtungen (in German). Köln: Kiepenhauer & Witsch. ISBN 3-462-01774-8. OCLC 15162393.
- Gaus, Günter (1988). Deutschland im Juni (in German). Köln: Kiepenheuer & Witsch. ISBN 3-462-01889-2. OCLC 20384471.
- Gaus, Günter (1990). Wendewut : eine Erzählung (in German). Hamburg: Hoffmann und Campe. ISBN 3-455-08379-X. OCLC 23372487.
- Gaus, Günter; Schütt, Hans-Dieter (2001). Was bleibt sind Fragen : die klassischen Interviews (in German). Berlin: Edition Ost im Verlag Das Neue Berlin. ISBN 3-360-01012-4. OCLC 47935370.
- Gaus, Günter; Ostdeutscher Rundfunk Brandenburg (1998). Zur Person (in German). Berlin: Edition Ost. ISBN 3-932180-20-8. OCLC 43594237.
- Gaus, Günter (2004). Widersprüche : Erinnerungen eines linken Konservativen (in German). [Berlin]: Propyläen. ISBN 3-549-07181-7. OCLC 56533439.
