= Graham Johnson (musician) =

British pianist (b.1950)

Graham Johnson OBE (born 10 July 1950) is a British pianist best known as an accompanist of Lieder.

== Biography ==
Johnson was born in Bulawayo, Southern Rhodesia. His father played the piano and the saxophone. In 1967, Johnson began studies at the Royal Academy of Music (RAM), where his teachers included Harry Isaacs and John Streets. Johnson has acknowledged a 1972 live recital by Peter Pears and Benjamin Britten as key in directing his musical career ambitions towards being an accompanist. After leaving the RAM in 1972, he continued studies with Gerald Moore and Geoffrey Parsons.

Graham was the official pianist at Peter Pears's first masterclasses at the Snape Maltings and so was brought into contact with Benjamin Britten. In 1976, he formed The Songmakers' Almanac to explore neglected areas of piano-accompanied vocal music, along with founder singers Felicity Lott, Ann Murray, Anthony Rolfe Johnson and Richard Jackson. The Songmakers' Almanac has given over 200 programmes throughout its history and has recorded commercially for such labels as Hyperion Records.

Johnson has a long-standing artistic relationship with the Wigmore Hall, as an accompanist and in programming concert series. He devised and accompanied concerts in the hall's re-opening series in 1992, and in its centenary celebrations in 2001. He has been a member of the jury for the Wigmore Hall Song Competition since its inception.

Especially noted for his commercial recordings of Lieder, in particular for the Hyperion label, Johnson is also renowned for his scholarship in his liner notes for these recordings. His first recording for Hyperion was the album Voices of the Night (1980). His major project for Hyperion was a series of 37 CDs of the complete Lieder of Franz Schubert. Hyperion reissued their complete Schubert Edition in 2005 with 3 supplemental CDs of Lieder by contemporaries and friends of Schubert. Before its completion, Johnson undertook recording, devising the programmes for each disc, and writing the liner notes for the Complete Songs of Robert Schumann, and initiated a recorded cycle of the Lieder of Johannes Brahms. He has also served as accompanist to recordings of French songs. Johnson has also recorded commercially for Sony Classical, BMG, harmonia mundi, Forlane, Collins Classics (later reissued on Naxos), EMI Classics and Deutsche Grammophon.

Johnson is Senior Professor of Accompaniment at the Guildhall School of Music and Drama and has led a biennial scheme for Young Songmakers since 1985. He is the author of several books, including The Songmakers' Almanac: Twenty Years of Recitals in London (Thames Publishing), The French Song Companion (Oxford University Press; 2000), Britten, Voice & Piano: Lectures on the Vocal Music of Benjamin Britten (Guildhall; 2003) and Gabriel Fauré – The Songs and Their Poets (Guildhall; 2009). In 2014, Yale University Press published Johnson's three-volume study of Schubert songs and vocal ensembles, and their poets.

In 1997 Johnson met the American baritone Brandon Velarde, with whom he entered into a civil partnership in 2005.

== Honours ==
Johnson was created an Officer of the Order of the British Empire (OBE) in the 1994 Birthday Honours list. He was the Royal Philharmonic Society's Instrumentalist of the Year in 1998. In June 2000, he was elected a member of the Royal Swedish Academy of Music. In 2002, he was created Chevalier in the Ordre des Arts et des Lettres by the French government. He was granted Honorary Membership in the Royal Philharmonic Society in 2010.

Awards for his recordings include the Gramophone solo vocal award in 1989 (with Dame Janet Baker), 1996 (Die schöne Müllerin with Ian Bostridge), 1997 (for the inauguration of the Robert Schumann series with Christine Schäfer) and 2001 (with Magdalena Kožená).

In February 2013 Graham Johnson received a special citation and medal from the Jerusalem Music Centre in Jerusalem, Israel, where he also gave master classes in piano accompaniment and took part in several concerts of Lieder by Franz Schubert.

In 2018 Graham Johnson was awarded the Schubert Prize by the German Schubert Society for his life's work.

In February 2021 Graham Johnson was awarded the Cross of the Order of Merit (Bundesverdienstkreuz) by the Federal Republic of Germany in recognition of his “outstanding contribution to the art of German song in Britain.” German President Frank-Walter Steinmeier praised the British pianist’s “tireless commitment to advancing the careers of young talent” and “special contribution to British-German musical friendship”.

== Bibliography ==
- The Songmakers' Almanac. Twenty Years of Recitals in London. Thames Publishing, 1997
- The French Song Companion. Oxford University Press, 2000
- Britten, Voice & Piano. Lectures on the Vocal Music of Benjamin Britten. Guildhall, 2003
- Gabriel Fauré. The Songs and Their Poets. Guildhall, 2009
- Franz Schubert. The Complete Songs. Yale University Press, 2014
