= Saskia Giorgini =

Italian-Dutch pianist (born 1985)

Saskia Giorgini (born 1985) is an Italian-Dutch pianist who won the Salzburg International Mozart Competition in 2016. She made her debut at the Vienna Musikverein in February 2017 playing an all Mozart recital. Her recording of Liszt’s Harmonies Poétiques et Religieuses was released on the PENTATONE label in 2021 to great acclaim, winning a Diapason d’Or.

She has since released several recordings on PENTATONE: solo albums Liszt: Consolations (2023) and Debussy: Images (2024), and several albums with Ian Bostridge including Schubert – Die schöne Müllerin (2020), Respighi Songs (2021), and Twilight Schumann Songs (2025).

Her most recent release (November 2025) is Mozart and Shostakovich, Concertos for Piano and Strings and Piano Sonata. In this album she performs Mozart’s Piano Concerto in A major (KV 414) in an intimate chamber music arrangement, Shostakovich’s Concerto No. 1 for Piano, Trumpet and Strings, and Shostakovich’s Piano Sonata No. 2 in B minor.
