= Julius Drake =

English pianist

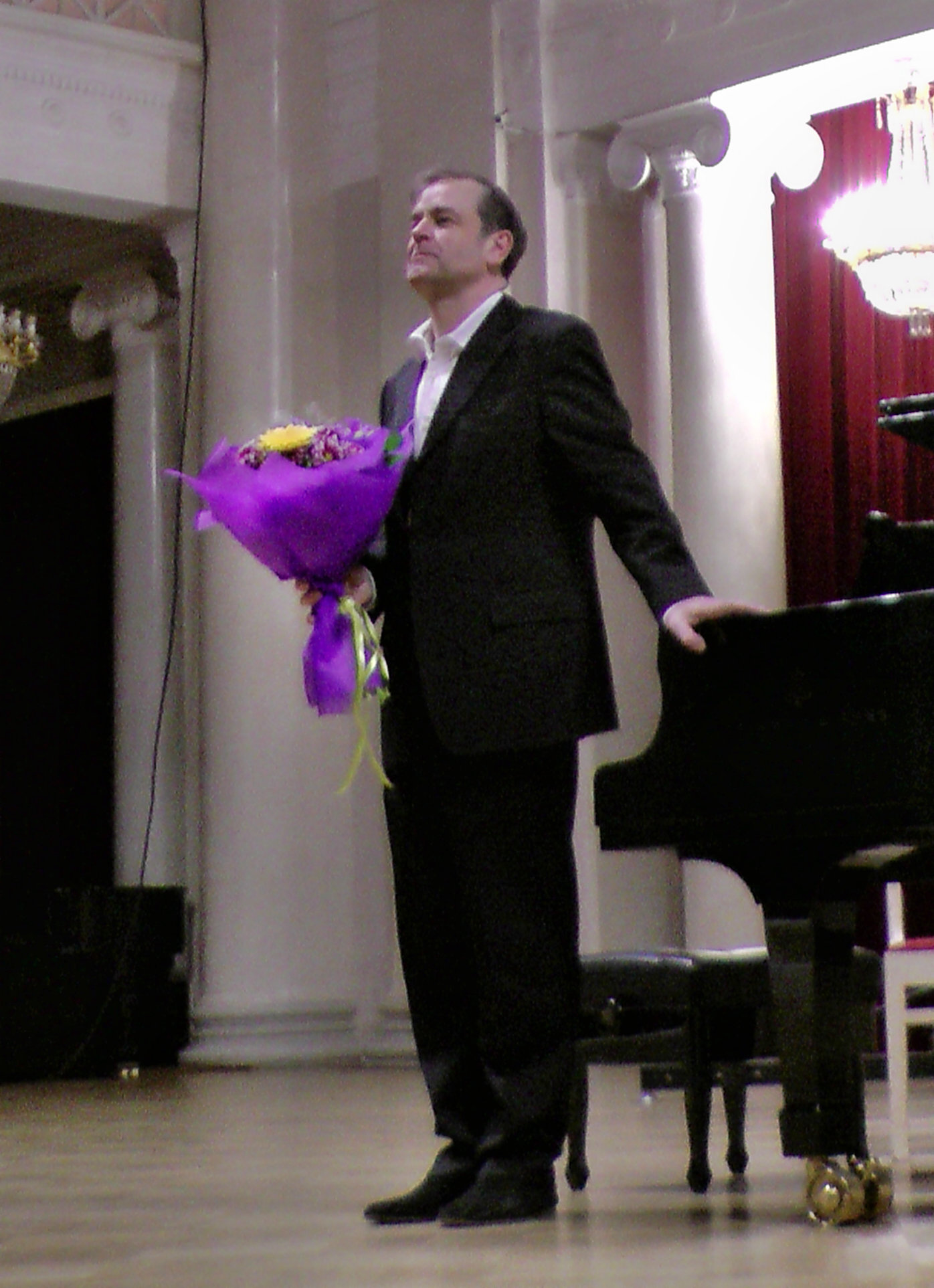
Julius Drake

Julius Drake (born 5 April 1959) is an English pianist who works as a song recital accompanist and chamber musician.

== Biography ==
Drake was educated at the Purcell School and the Royal College of Music; he made his professional debut at the Purcell Room in 1981 and developed a special affinity for the music of Robert Schumann. Drake is now a professor at the Guildhall School of Music and Drama and a visiting professor at the Royal Northern College of Music; he lives in London with his wife and two children and, between performing, recording and teaching, is actively involved in the Jean Meikle Music Trust, a charity set up in commemoration of his mother. Drake is an uncle of theatre and opera director Sophie Hunter.

Drake was director of the Perth International Chamber Music Festival in Australia from 2000 to 2003 and was musical director of Deborah Warner's staging of Janáček's Diary of One Who Vanished, touring to Munich, London, Dublin, Amsterdam and New York; he was artistic director of Leeds Lieder 2009 and directs the Machynlleth Festival in Wales from 2009 - 2011. He has devised song programmes for the Wigmore Hall, London, the BBC, the Concertgebouw, Amsterdam, and the historic Middle Temple Hall in London with such recitalists as Thomas Allen, Olaf Bär, Ian Bostridge, Alice Coote, Angelika Kirchschlager, Sergei Leiferkus, Felicity Lott, Katarina Karnéus, Christopher Maltman, Mark Padmore, Amanda Roocroft, Ann Mackay and Willard White; he also has a longstanding partnership with oboist Nicholas Daniel.

Drake's numerous recordings include playing on screen in David Alden's 1997 film of Schubert's Winterreise for Channel 4 with Ian Bostridge.

== Select discography ==
- Schubert: Die Schöne Müllerin with Gerald Finley (Hyperion, 2022)
- Tchaikovsky: Romances with Christianne Stotijn (Onyx, 2009)
- Ravel: Songs with Gerald Finley (Hyperion, 2009)
- Lorraine Hunt Lieberson live at Wigmore Hall (2008)
- Gerald Finley live at Wigmore Hall (2008)
- Schumann: Dichterliebe and other Heine settings (Hyperion, 2008)
- Grieg: Songs with Katarina Karnéus (Hyperion, 2008)
- Ives: Songs (vol.11), Romanzo di Central Park with Gerald Finley (Hyperion, 2008)
- Barber: Songs with Gerald Finley (Hyperion, 2007)
- Christopher Maltman live at Wigmore Hall (2007)
- Pasión! with Joyce DiDonato (Eloquentia, 2007)
- Gustav Mahler: Urlicht (lieder) with Christianne Stotijn (Onyx, 2006)
- Songs of Venice with Joyce DiDonato (Wigmore Hall, 2006)
- Voyage à Paris with Lynne Dawson (Berlin Classics, 2005)
- Schubert: 25 Lieder with Ian Bostridge (EMI Classics, 2005)
- French Song with Ian Bostridge (EMI Classics, 2005)
- Alice Coote - songs (EMI Classics, 2003)
- Shostakovich: Sonatas with Annette Batorldi (Naxos, 2003)
- Britten : Canticles & Folksongs with Ian Bostridge (Virgin Classics, 2002)
- The English Songbook with Ian Bostridge (EMI Classics, 2002)
- Sibelius: Songs with Katarina Karnéus (Hyperion, 2002)
- Ivor Gurney: Seaven Meadows with Paul Agnew (Hyperion, 2001)
- Schubert: Lieder volume II with Ian Bostridge (EMI Classics, 2001)
- Henze: Songs with Ian Bostridge (EMI Classics, 2001)
- Schumann: Lieder with Sophie Daneman (EMI Classics, 2001)
- Schumann: Liederkreis & Dichterliebe etc. with Ian Bostridge (EMI Classics, 1998)
- 21 Schubert Songs with Alice Coote (Hyperion, 2022)
