= Marianne von Willemer =

Austrian actress and dancer (1784–1860)

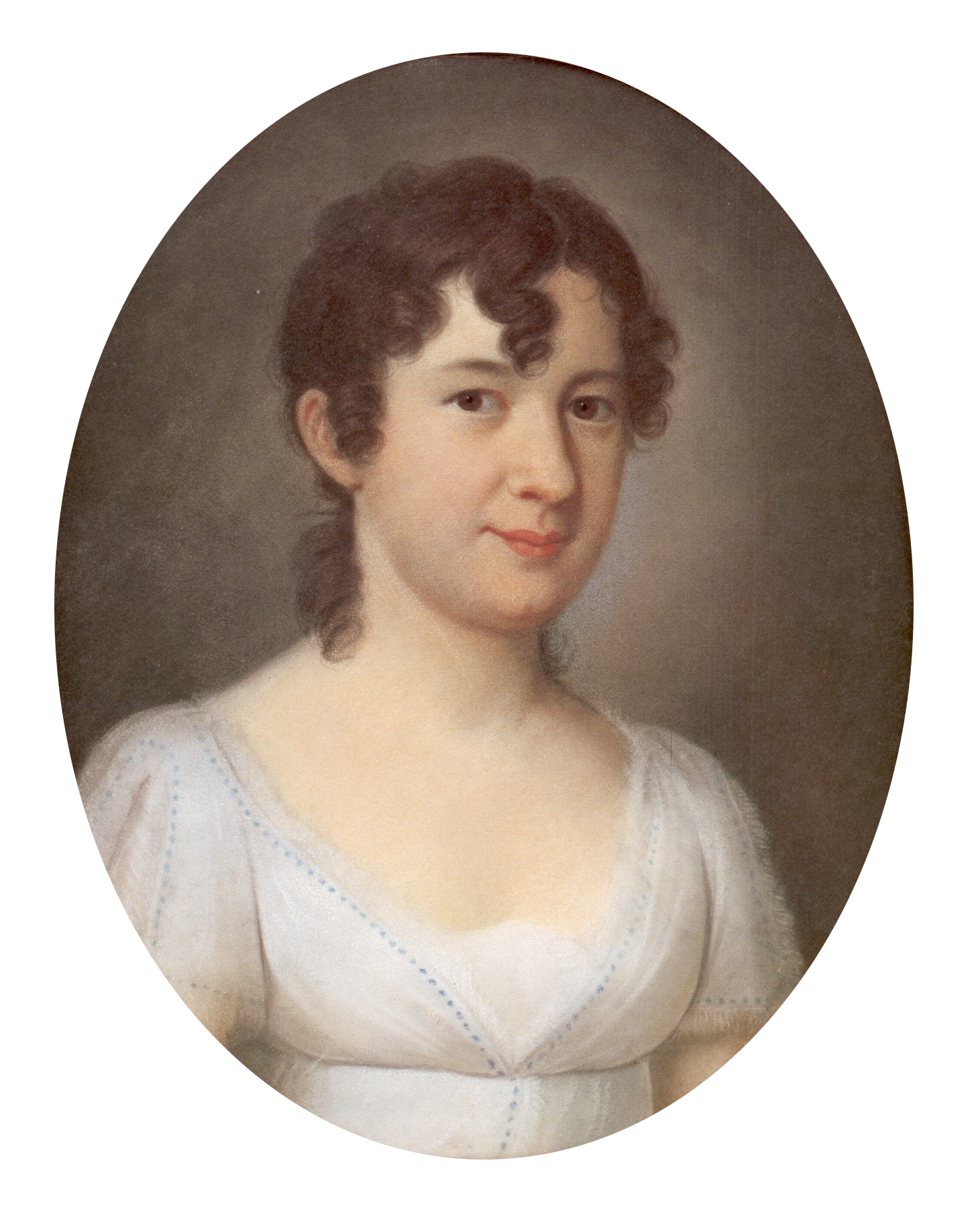
- Painting of von Willemer by Johann Jacob de Lose (1809)
- Born: 20 November 1784; Linz, Austrian Empire (probably)
- Died: 6 December 1860 (aged 76); Frankfurt
- Occupations: Actress, dancer, poet
- Spouse: Johann Jakob von Willemer

Marianne von Willemer (also known as Marianne Jung; 20 November 1784 – 6 December 1860) was an Austrian actress and dancer best known for her relationship with Johann Wolfgang von Goethe and her appearance in his poetry.

== Biography ==
She was born on 20 November 1784, probably in Linz. At the age of 14 she moved to Frankfurt, where she became the third wife of Frankfurt banker Johann Jakob von Willemer. He introduced her to Goethe, who met Marianne in 1814 and 1815. Goethe immortalised her in the Buch Suleika of his late work West-östlicher Divan; she later revealed that several of its poems were authored by her.

She died on 6 December 1860 in Frankfurt.
