= West–östlicher Divan =

1819 poem collection by Johann Wolfgang von Goethe

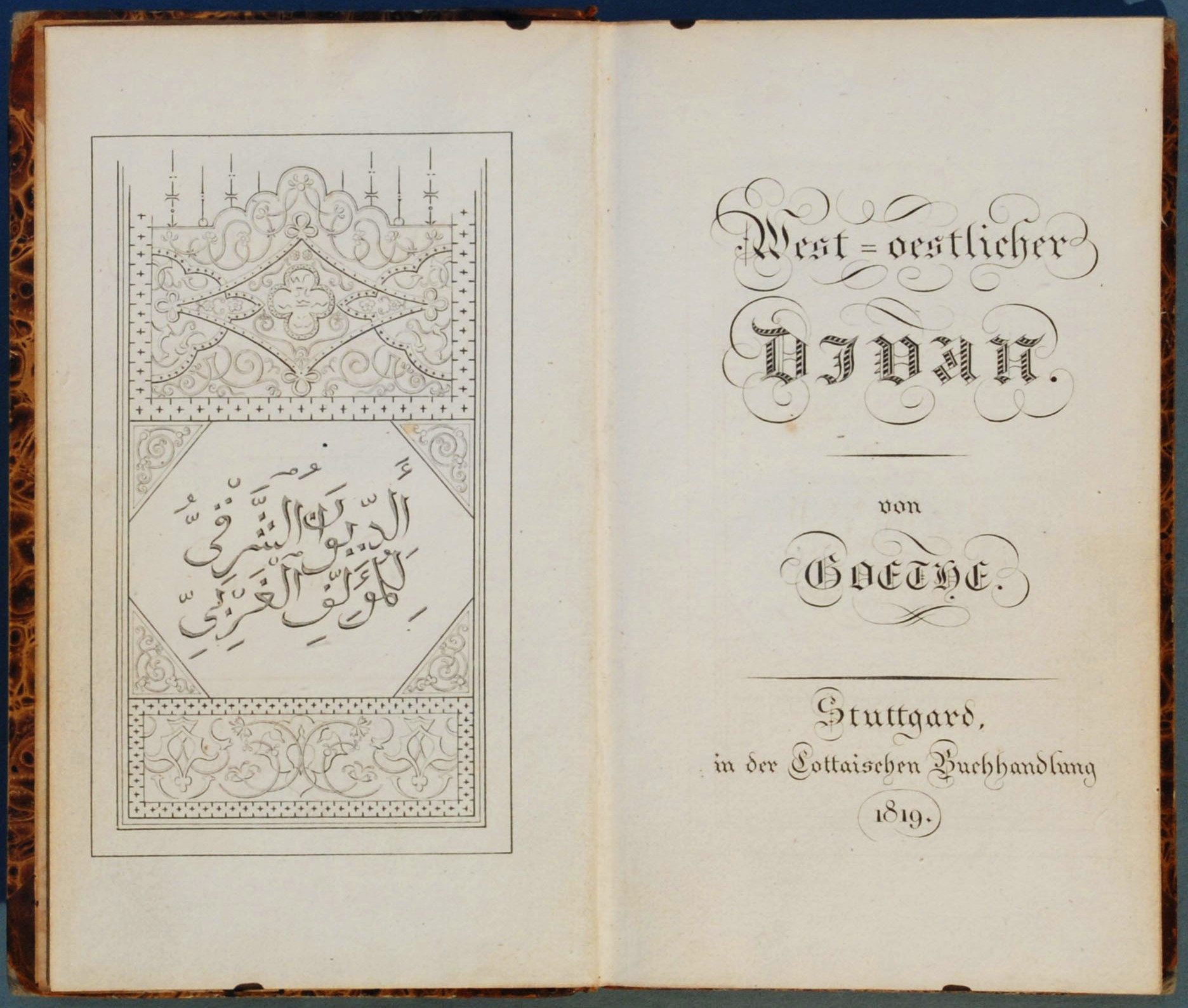
Frontispiece and title page of the first edition, Cotta publishing house, Stuttgart, 1819

West–östlicher Divan (German: [ˈvɛst ˈœstlɪçɐ ˈdiːvaːn]; West–Eastern Diwan) is a diwan, or collection of lyrical poems, by the German poet Johann Wolfgang von Goethe. It was inspired by Goethe's readings of the Persian national poet Hafez.

== Composition ==
West–Eastern Diwan was written between 1814 and 1819, the year when it was first published. It was inspired by Goethe's correspondence with Marianne von Willemer and the translation of Hafez's poems by the orientalist Joseph von Hammer. An expanded version was printed in 1827. It is part of Goethe's late work and the last great cycle of poetry he wrote.

The initial issue consisted of twelve books:

- Book of the Singer (Moganni Nameh)
- Book of Hafiz (Hafis Nameh)
- Book of Love (Uschk Nameh)
- Book of Reflection (Tefkir Nameh)
- Book of Ill Humour (Rendsch Nameh)
- Book of Maxims (Hikmet Nameh)
- Book of Timur (Timur Nameh)
- Book of Zuleika (Suleika Nameh)
- Book of the Cupbearer (Saki Nameh)
- Book of Parables (Mathal Nameh)
- Book of the Parsees (Parsi Nameh)
- Book of Paradise (Chuld Nameh)

The work can be seen as a symbol for a stimulating exchange and mixture between Orient and Occident. The phrase "west–eastern" refers not only to an exchange between Germany and the Middle East, but also between Latin and Persian cultures, as well as the Christian and Muslim cultures. The twelve books consist of poetry of all different kinds: parables, historical allusions, pieces of invective, politically or religiously inclined poetry mirroring the attempt to bring together Orient and Occident.

For a better understanding, Goethe added "Notes and Queries", in which he comments on historical figures, events, terms and places.

== Reception ==
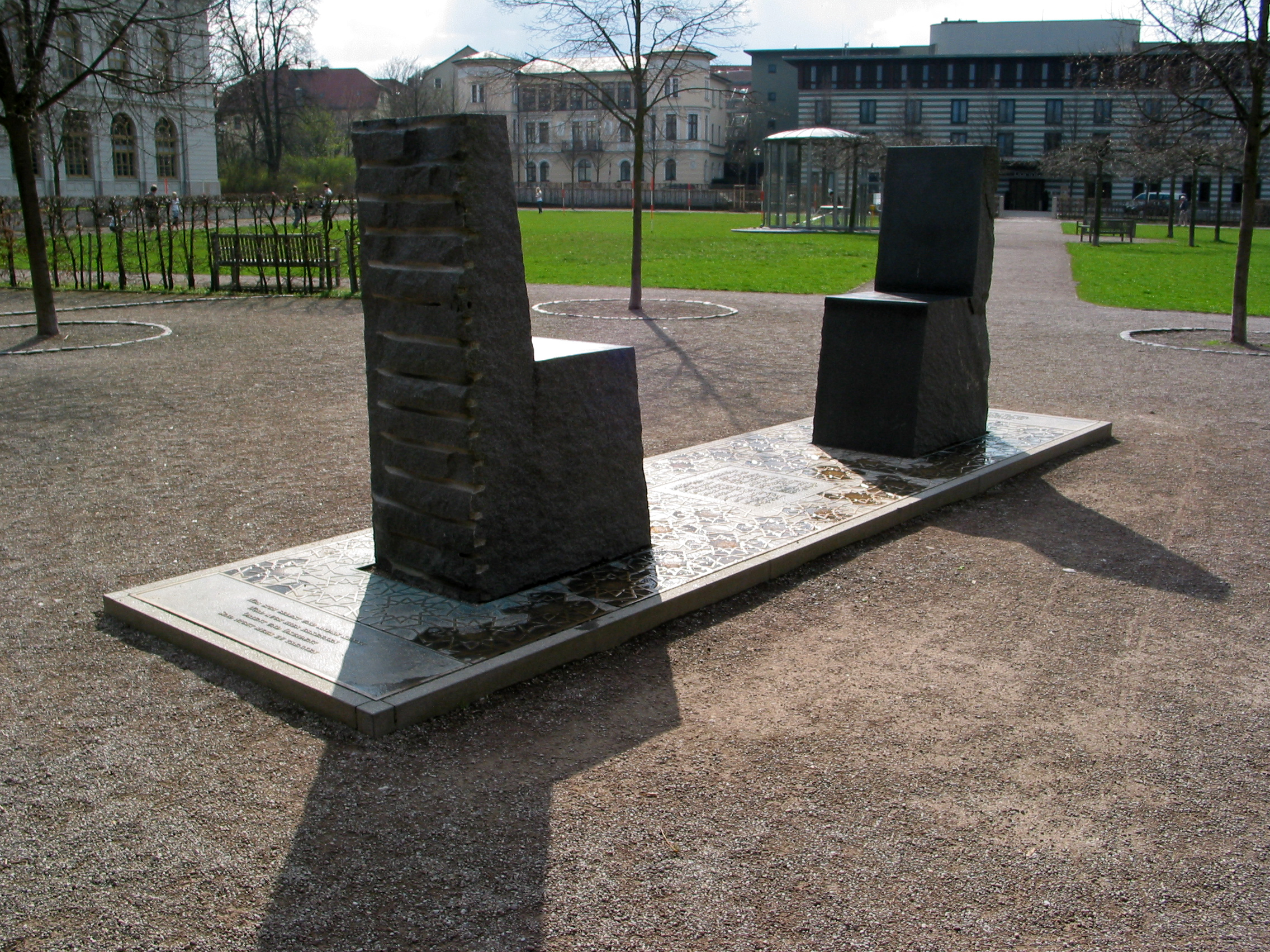
Hafez-Goethe monument in Weimar, Germany

West-Eastern Diwan influenced poets such as Friedrich Rückert, who in 1822 issued his Östliche Rosen (Eastern Roses) collection of Oriental poetry, as well as Christian Morgenstern and Walter Benjamin. In 1923 the Persian-language poet Sir Muhammad Iqbal issued the Payam-e-Mashriq (Message from the East) in reply to Goethe's salute.

Various poems were set to music by Franz Schubert (D 717 "Suleika II", Op. 31; D 719 "Geheimes", Op. 14 No. 2; D 720 "Suleika I", Op. 14 No. 1), Robert Schumann (Op. 25 Myrthen: No. 2 "Freisinn", No. 5 "Sitz' ich allein", No. 6 "Setze mir nicht", No. 8 "Talisman", No. 9 "Lied der Suleika"), Felix Mendelssohn (Op. 34 No. 4 "Suleika: Ach, um deine feuchten Schwingen"; Op. 57 No. 3 "Suleika: Was bedeutet die Bewegung?"), Hugo Wolf (Goethe-Lieder), Richard Strauss (Op. 67 No. 4 "Wer wird von der Welt verlangen"), Waldemar von Baußnern (Symphonic Cantata Hafis), Arnold Schoenberg, and Othmar Schoeck.

== See also ==
- West–Eastern Divan Orchestra
- Sufism
