= Petersfield (disambiguation) =

Petersfield is a market town and civil parish in the East Hampshire district of Hampshire, England.

Petersfield may also refer to:

== Places ==
- Petersfield, Cambridgeshire, England
- Petersfield, Jamaica, a small town in the parish of Westmoreland
- Petersfield, Manitoba, an unincorporated community in Canada

== Other uses ==
- Petersfield (UK Parliament constituency), a former constituency in Petersfield, Hampshire
- Petersfield railway station, a railway station in Petersfield, Hampshire
- The Petersfield School, a comprehensive school in Petersfield, Hampshire
- Petersfield Town F.C., a football club in Petersfield, Hampshire
- Petersfield R.F.C., a rugby union club based in Petersfield, Hampshire
- HMS Petersfield

== See also ==
- Peterfield, an historic home in Allendale, New Jersey, U.S.
