= William Cowper (anatomist) =

English surgeon and anatomist (c. 1666 – 1709)

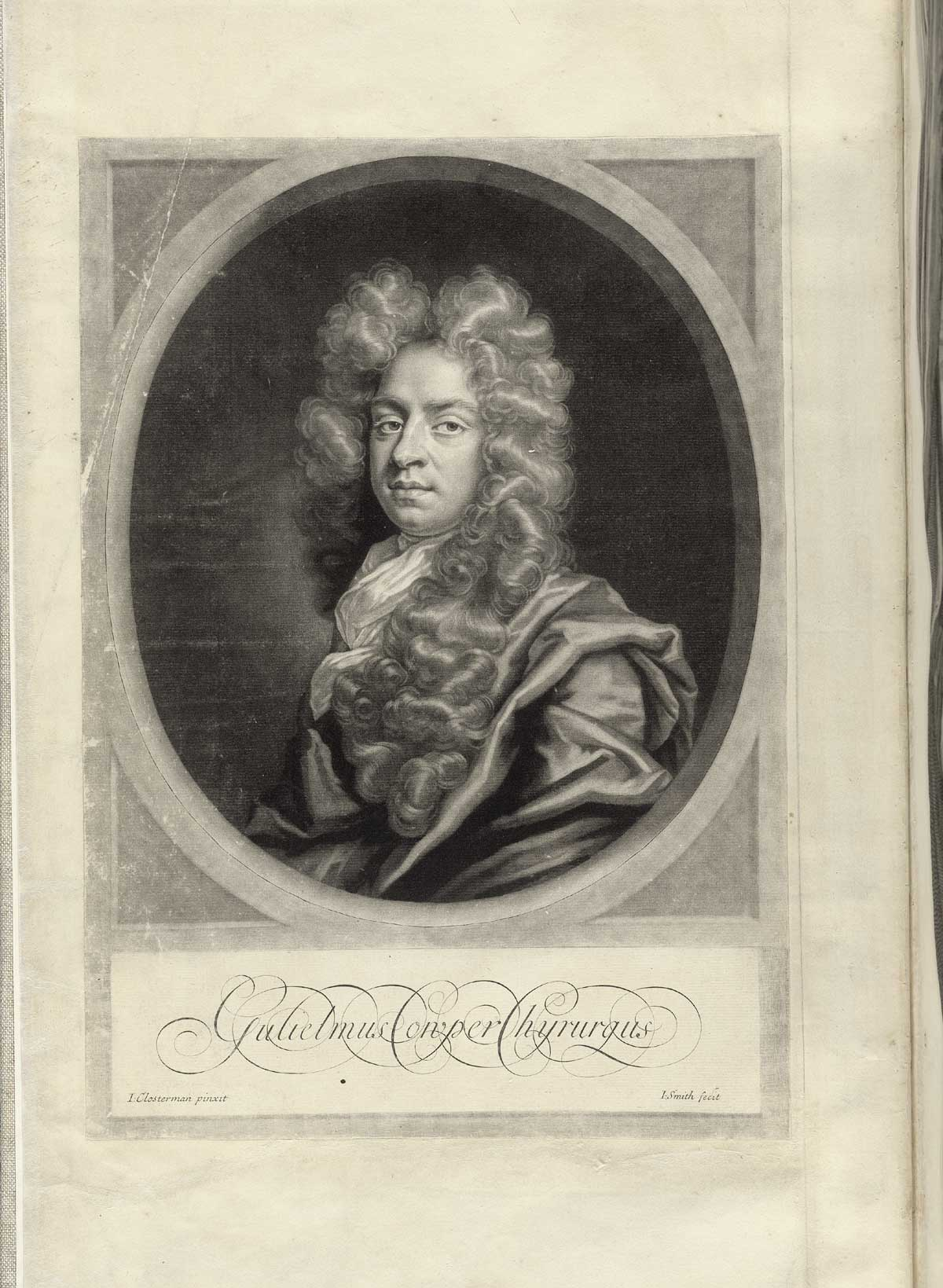
William Cowper. Source: NLM

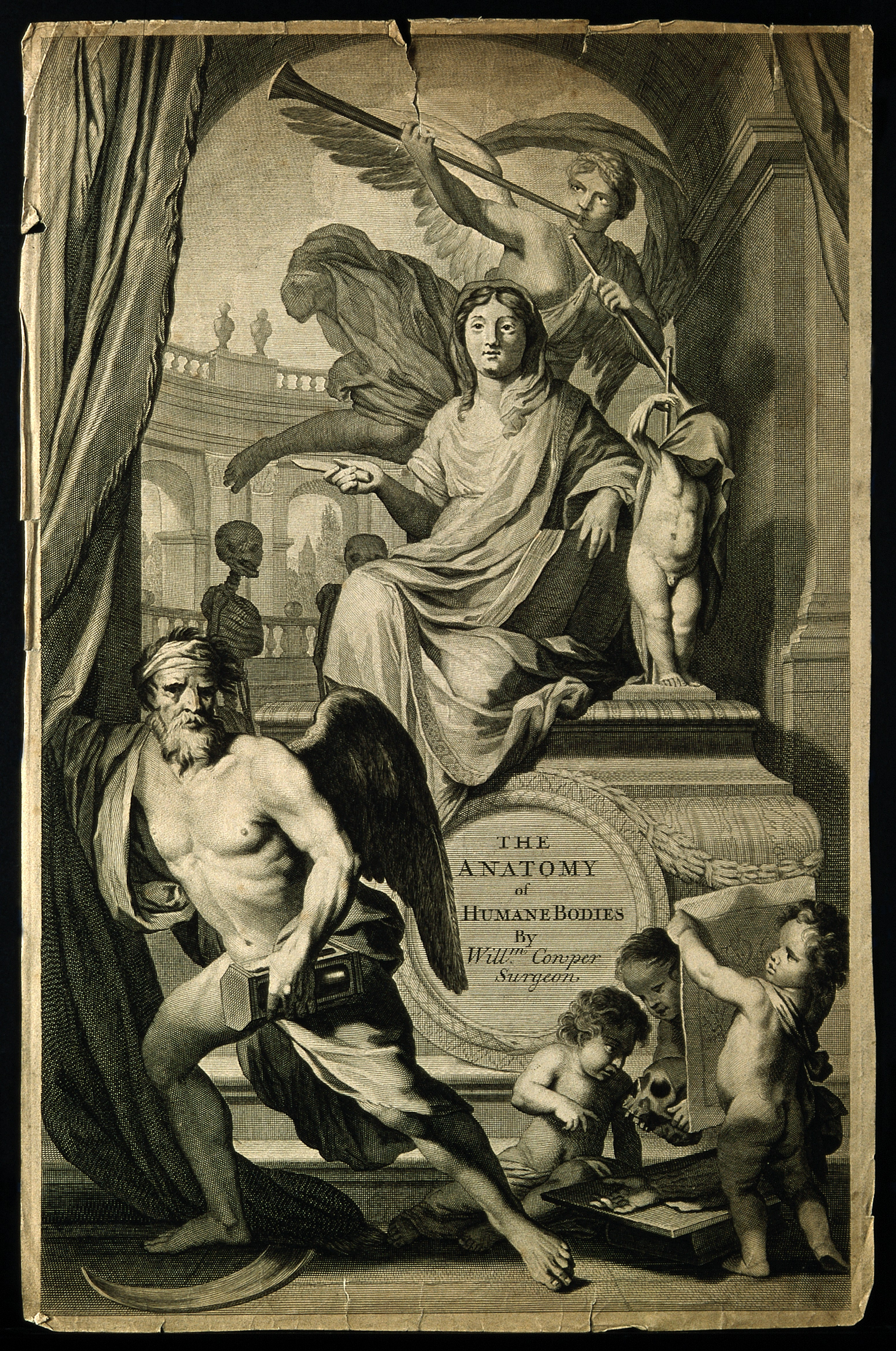
Titlepage to Anatomie of humane bodies

William Cowper FRS (/ˈkuːpər/ KOO-pər; c. 1666 – 8 March 1709) was an English surgeon and anatomist, famous for his early description of what is now known as Cowper's gland.

Cowper was born in Petersfield, Hampshire, and he was apprenticed to a London surgeon, William Bignall, in March 1682. He was admitted to the Company of Barber-Surgeons in 1691 and began practising in London the same year. In 1694, he published his noted work, Myotomia Reformata, or a New Administration of the Muscles, and he was elected a member of the Royal Society in 1696. In 1698, he published The Anatomy of the Humane Bodies, which gained him great fame and notoriety, and over the next eleven years he published a number of tracts on topics ranging from surgery and pathology to physiology and anatomy. He died on 8 March 1709, and was buried in St Peter's Church, Petersfield.

Some have called Cowper's Anatomy of the Humane Bodies one of the greatest acts of plagiarism in all of medical publishing, though others have not been as harsh. In 1685, Govard Bidloo (1649–1713) published his Anatomia Humani Corporis in Amsterdam using 105 beautiful plates drawn by Gérard de Lairesse (1640–1711) and engraved by Abraham Blooteling (1640–1690). A Dutch version was later printed in 1690, entitled Ontleding des Menschelyken Lichaams, but when sales went poorly, Bidloo's publishers sold 300 copies of the unbound plates to William Cowper (or his publishers).

Cowper proceeded to write a new English text to accompany the plates, many of them showing a great deal of original research and fresh new insights. He also commissioned nine new plates drawn by Henry Cooke (1642–1700) and engraved by Michiel van der Gucht (1660–1725), among which were front and back views of the entire musculature. The book was then published under Cowper's name with no mention of Bidloo or Lairesse, with the original engraved, allegorical title page amended with an irregular piece of paper lettered: "The anatomy of the humane bodies ...," which fits over the Dutch title.

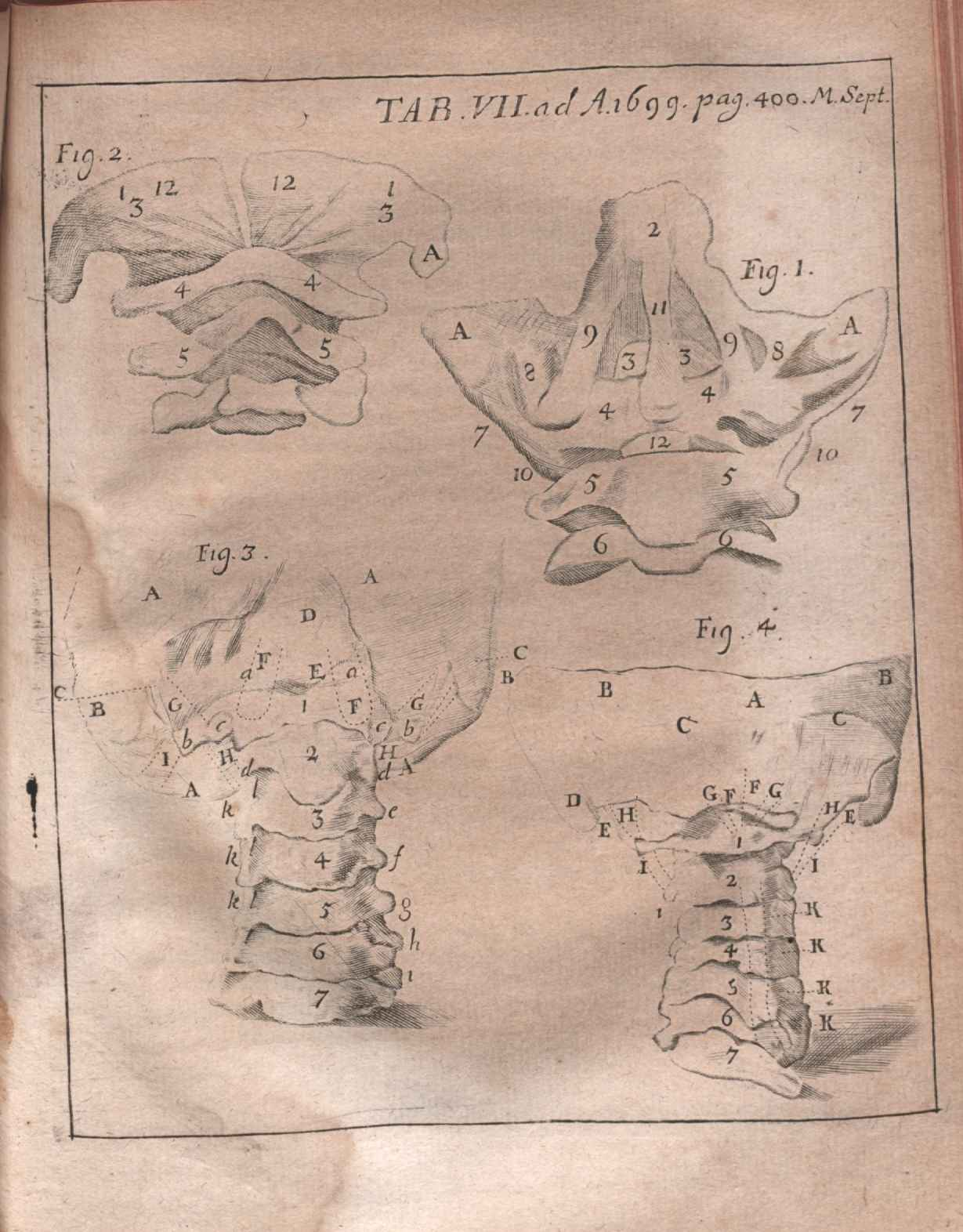
Illustration from Descriptio quinque parium musculorum... published in the journal Acta Eruditorum, 1699

A number of vitriolic exchanges took place between Bidloo and Cowper, including several pamphlets published in each anatomist's defence. Cowper claimed, without much evidence presented, that the plates were not Bidloo's at all, but that they were commissioned by Jan Swammerdam (1637–1680) and that after his death Swammerdam's widow had sold them to Bidloo. Whatever the truth may be, it is undeniable that Cowper was a great anatomist and surgeon in his own right – and that he clearly did not give Govard Bidloo proper credit for his involvement in this work.

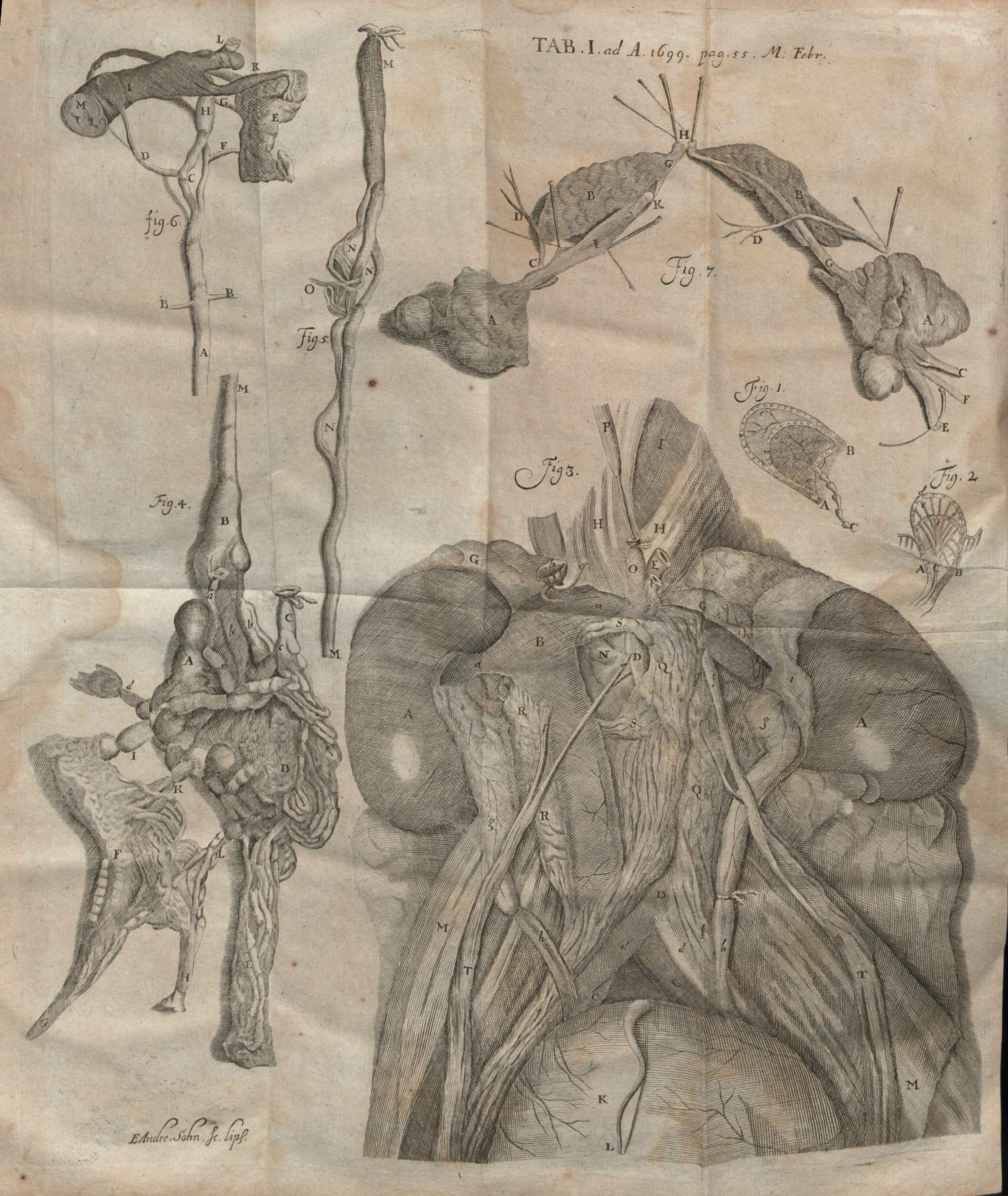
Illustration from critique of Anatomia corporis humani... published in Acta Eruditorum, 1699
