= Eastman's Royal Naval Academy =

Preparatory school

Eastman's Royal Naval Academy, originally in Southsea and later at Winchester, both in England, was a preparatory school. Between 1855 and 1923 it was known primarily as a school that prepared boys for entry to the Royal Navy. Thereafter, it was renamed Eastman's Preparatory School and continued until the 1940s. According to Jonathan Betts, it was "considered one of the top schools for boys intended for the Navy".

== History ==
The introduction in 1838 of an entrance examination for the Royal Navy, although initially an undemanding test for most, encouraged the development of specialised educational establishments, of which Eastman's Royal Naval Academy was one. Despite its name, the Academy had no formal association with the Navy. It was founded by Thomas Eastman, a retired naval instructor, in 1851, and in 1854 had moved into a purpose-built building on South Parade, Southsea, England. There it catered primarily for boarders but did take some day-boys. When Eastman died in 1860 he was succeeded by one of the teaching staff, George E. Spickernell (c. 1833-1901), (Note: George Spickernell was elected a Fellow of the Royal Geographical Society in 1863.) who a year later married Eastman's widow, Sarah, and continued as headmaster until 1885.

The school was advertising itself in The Lancet in 1870, saying that it took boys from the age of nine, offered supervised bathing and boating, and had both a gymnasium and a fives court. It claimed that over 900 pupils had gone on to careers in the armed services. There was a distinct nautical bent to the curriculum which, aside from teaching subjects such as Latin, Greek and English literature, included instruction in the tying of knots, carpentry and the rudiments of navigation. The proximity of the school to the sea was also exploited, especially when naval ships were present.

It had relocated to Winchester by 1898. It was among those that became accredited by the Admiralty as examination centres for entrance to the Royal Navy, although the decision to single out a handful of schools in this way led to a successful protest from the Association of Preparatory School Headmasters in 1901. The Association considered the selection of a few was unfair to the remainder.

According to Hugh Owen, the school was known as Eastman's Preparatory School for Boys from 1911; another source says that it was in 1923 that the then joint headmasters, Thomas Gilderdale and Donald Mercer, turned it into a general school known by that name. The school closed during World War II; between 1946-1954, prior to being demolished, the buildings at Southsea were used as a boarding house for Portsmouth Grammar School.

Thomas Eastman's son, Thomas Eastman junior, had taught at the school in 1872, around the time that he was attending or due to attend the University of Cambridge, and was on the staff from 1876. In 1881, he opened his own school at Wallington, Hampshire, also called Eastman's Royal Naval Academy. In 1886, this school was moved to Stubbington and in 1894 moved again to Northwood Park (former home of Philip Vanderbyl), near Winchester. This coincided with a change of name to Northwood Park Naval College, which later became Eastman and Salter Private School before he closed it in 1913. The Northwood buildings were then sold to Clayesmore School.

== Notable alumni ==
According to Owen

E.R.N.A., Southsea, never had quite the fame of Dr Burney's Royal Academy which flourished in Gosport from 1791 to 1904, nor of Stubbington House School near Fareham which was run by the Foster family from 1840 to 1962. But certainly E.R.N.A. was considered by distinguished naval officers as a suitable school for their sons, and it had many distinguished alumni.

Among those alumni were:

- Captain Augustus Agar, VC, DSO
- Admiral Sir Robert Burnett, GBE, KCB, CStJ, DSO
- Major Cecil Cameron, CBE, DSO
- Sir C. Preston Colvin
- Charles Vandeleur Creagh, CMG
- Vice Admiral Sir William Rooke Creswell
- Sydney Dickens, naval officer and son of the novelist Charles Dickens
- Vice-Admiral Sir Percy Douglas, KCB CMG FRGS FRAS AICE
- Admiral Sir Martin Dunbar-Nasmith, VC KCB KCMG
- Admiral of the Fleet Sir Charles Forbes, GCB, DSO
- Field Marshal John French, 1st Earl of Ypres, KP, GCB, OM, GCVO, KCMG, ADC, PC
- Lieutenant Commander Rupert Gould
- Frederick Hervey, 4th Marquess of Bristol
- Commander Loftus William Jones VC
- Joseph Kenworthy, 10th Baron Strabolgi
- Admiral Sir Geoffrey Layton, GBE, KCB, KCMG, DSO
- Admiral Sir Albert Hastings Markham, KCB
- Admiral of the Fleet Sir William May, GCB GCVO
- Admiral Sir Harry Rawson, GCB GCMG
- Vice-Admiral Sir Charles Royds, KBE CMG ADC FRGS
- Admiral Sir Percy Royds, CB CMG ADC
- Admiral Sir Percy Scott
- Admiral of the Fleet Sir Edward Hobart Seymour
- Robert Scot Skirving, surgeon

== See also ==
- Stubbington House School
- Burney's Academy
