= Henry Landau (British Army officer) =

- Born: 7 March 1892; Bethel, South African Republic
- Died: 20 May 1968 (aged 76); Chilapa, Mexico
- Awards: Officer of the Most Excellent Order of the British Empire, Croix de Guerre, Knight of the Order of the Crown of Belgium.
- Espionage activity
- Allegiance: Great-Britain
- Service branch: Royal Field Artillery, SIS (MI6)
- Service years: 1914-1916 Royal Field Artillery, 1916-1920 SIS (MI6)
- Rank: army captain
- Operations: World War I

Henry Landau OBE (7 March 1892 – 20 May 1968) was a South African World War I volunteer who served with the British Army's Royal Field Artillery when he was recruited into what is now known as the SIS (MI6). He was notable as the handler of one of the most effective spy rings of the First World War, La Dame Blanche, and later wrote a number of bestselling novels about his experiences during the war.

== Early career ==
Landau was born to an Afrikaner mother and English father who fought in the Boer Commandos during the Second Anglo-Boer War. He studied at Caius College, Cambridge, graduating with first-class honours in Natural Sciences before the Great War broke out.

== World War I ==
In August 1914 he went to France with a volunteer hospital unit, later gaining a commission with the Royal Field Artillery. After sick leave in London and a dinner date with one of the secretaries of the head of MI6, Royal Navy Captain Mansfield Smith-Cumming (the original "C"), Landau was recruited and sent to the MI6 station in Rotterdam. From there all the British spy networks in Belgium, France and Germany itself were handled under the command of Richard B. Tinsley.

Landau became head of military intelligence station in Rotterdam, and his main task was to connect with Belgian resistance groups. His biggest success would be the handling of La Dame Blanche, a group of more than a thousand Belgian and French agents who monitored the movement of German troop trains to and from the Western Front. Named after a mythical White Lady whose appearance was supposed to presage the downfall of the German Imperial House of Hohenzollern, it was arguably the most effective intelligence operation of the First World War and, according to Cumming, produced 70 per cent of all Allied intelligence on the German forces worldwide.

== After the War ==
After the war Landau was sent to lead the passport control office in Berlin, in theory a very prestigious post within MI6. Not able to deal with bureaucracy and boredom, he resigned the military in 1920 and took employment procuring patents and inventions for a British shipbuilding company. He later returned to South Africa, before emigrating to the United States in 1923 where he worked as a teacher. After obtaining U.S. citizenship in 1933, Landau worked as an investigator for the Federal Works Agency and the U.S. Maritime Commission.

In 1934 Landau published his memoirs as a World War I spy master. In the book, All's Fair, he revealed the existence of Karl Krüger, a former officer in the German Imperial Navy, who was one of MI6's most important World War I spies. Although Landau did not reveal Krüger's name, as Krüger was still active, MI6 considered Landau persona non grata. His book was published in the U.K. in 1938 as Spreading The Spy Net. The Story of a British Spy Director. After All's Fair became a bestseller, Landau wrote two more books: Secrets of the White Lady (1935) and The Enemy Within. The Inside Story of German Sabotage in America (1937).

== Bibliography ==
- Jeffery, Keith. MI6. The History of the Secret Intelligence Service 1909-1949. London: Bloomsbury, 2010.
- Landau, Henry. All's Fair. The Story of the British Secret Service Behind the German Lines. New York: G.P. Putnam's Sons, 1934.
- Landau, Henry. Secrets of The White Lady. New York: G.P. Putnam's Sons, 1935.
- Landau, Henry. The Enemy Within. New York: G.P. Putnam's Sons, 1937.
- Landau, Henry. Spreading The Spy Net. Great Britain: Jarrolds Ltd., 1938.
- Ruis, Edwin. Spynest. British and German Espionage from Neutral Holland 1914-1918. Briscombe: The History Press, 2016.
