= Cecil Aylmer Cameron =

Major Cecil Aylmer Cameron CBE DSO (17 September 1883 – 19 August 1924) was a British Army officer and spymaster and also a central figure of a notable fraud trial of 1911.

The son of Colonel Aylmer Spicer Cameron VC, he was educated at Eastman's Royal Naval Academy, Bath College, and the Royal Military Academy, Woolwich, and was commissioned into the Royal Field Artillery in 1901. On 3 June 1909, he married Ruby Mary Shawe, born in Ireland in 1884, at St George's, Hanover Square.

In 1911 he and his wife were convicted of fraud in Edinburgh and sentenced to three years' imprisonment for attempting to defraud Lloyd's by claiming £6,500 for the theft of Mrs Cameron's pearl necklace, which had not actually been stolen. He refused to give evidence in his defence and served the full sentence. Following his release, a petition for a pardon was signed by, among others, five dukes, twenty privy councillors, and 126 generals. During her imprisonment, his wife confessed that she alone was the guilty party and Cameron had only been protecting her. He received a full pardon and was restored to his rank of Lieutenant.

He served as a staff officer in France during the First World War, during which time he was mentioned in dispatches four times and awarded the Distinguished Service Order (DSO). Under the codename EVELYN, Cameron was the handler of the La Dame Blanche spy ring in German-occupied France and Belgium from stations at Folkestone in England, Rotterdam in the Netherlands, and Montreuil in France.

In 1918 he was transferred to the War Office in London, but as a fluent Russian-speaker was soon afterwards appointed Chief Intelligence Officer with the British Military Mission to Siberia during the Russian Civil War, for which he was appointed Commander of the Order of the British Empire (CBE) in the Siberian War Honours of January 1920. In 1920 he returned to the War Office as a General Staff Officer in the Military Operations Directorate and also served during the Irish War of Independence.

Cameron, aged 40, was found shot dead at Hillsborough Barracks in Sheffield in 1924.
