= Dame Blanche (resistance) =

Resistance movement

La Dame Blanche (French; lit. 'The White Lady') was the codename for an underground intelligence network that operated in German-occupied Belgium during World War I. It was named after a German legend that foretold the fall of the Hohenzollern dynasty would be signaled by the appearance of a woman in white.

The network gathered information on German troop movements by monitoring the railway system.

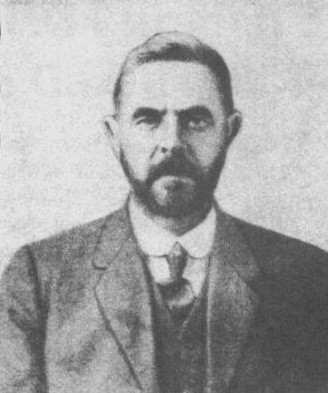
Walthère Dewé

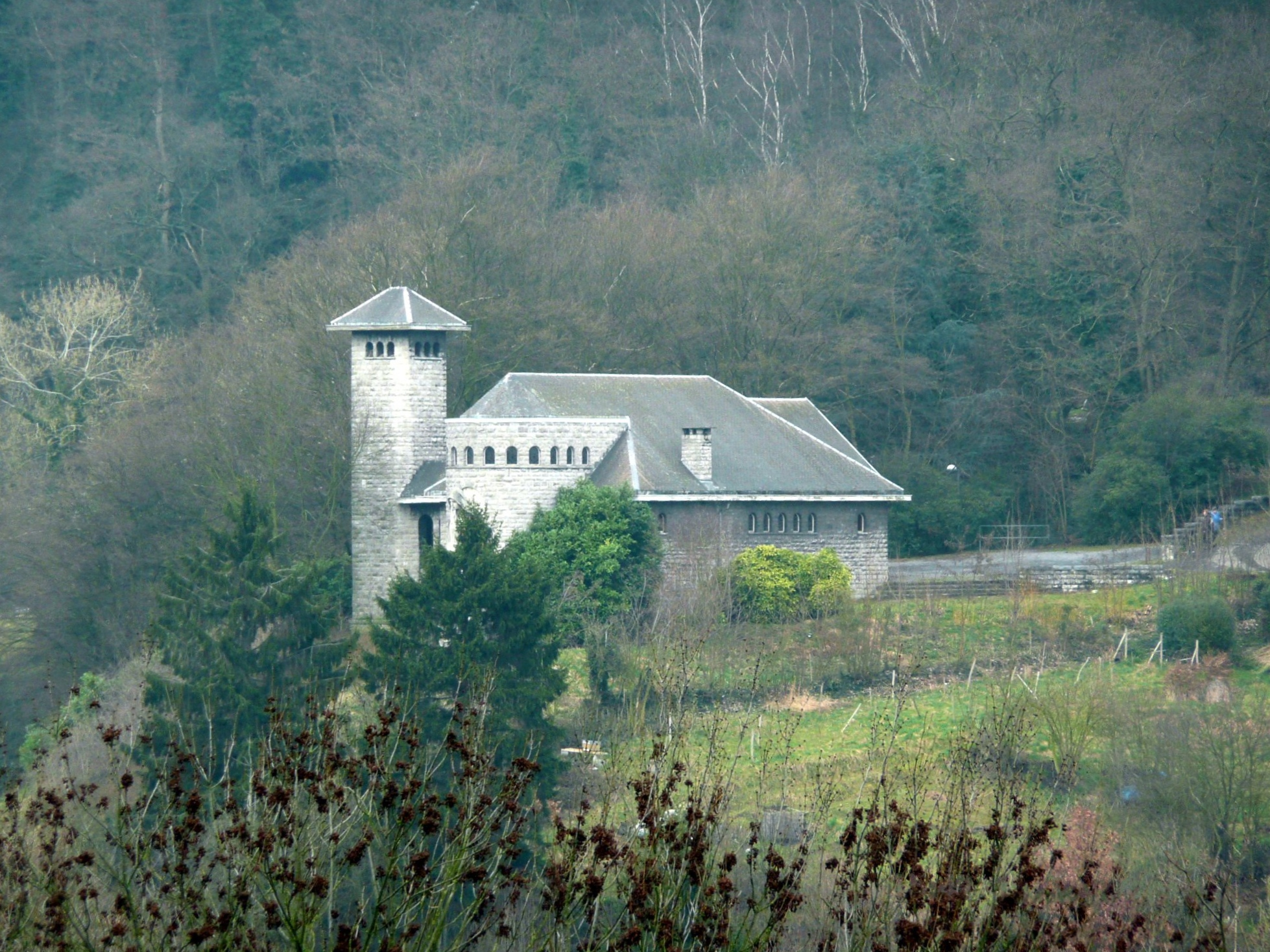
Chapel Saint-Maurice "Memorial Walthère Dewé" in 2011

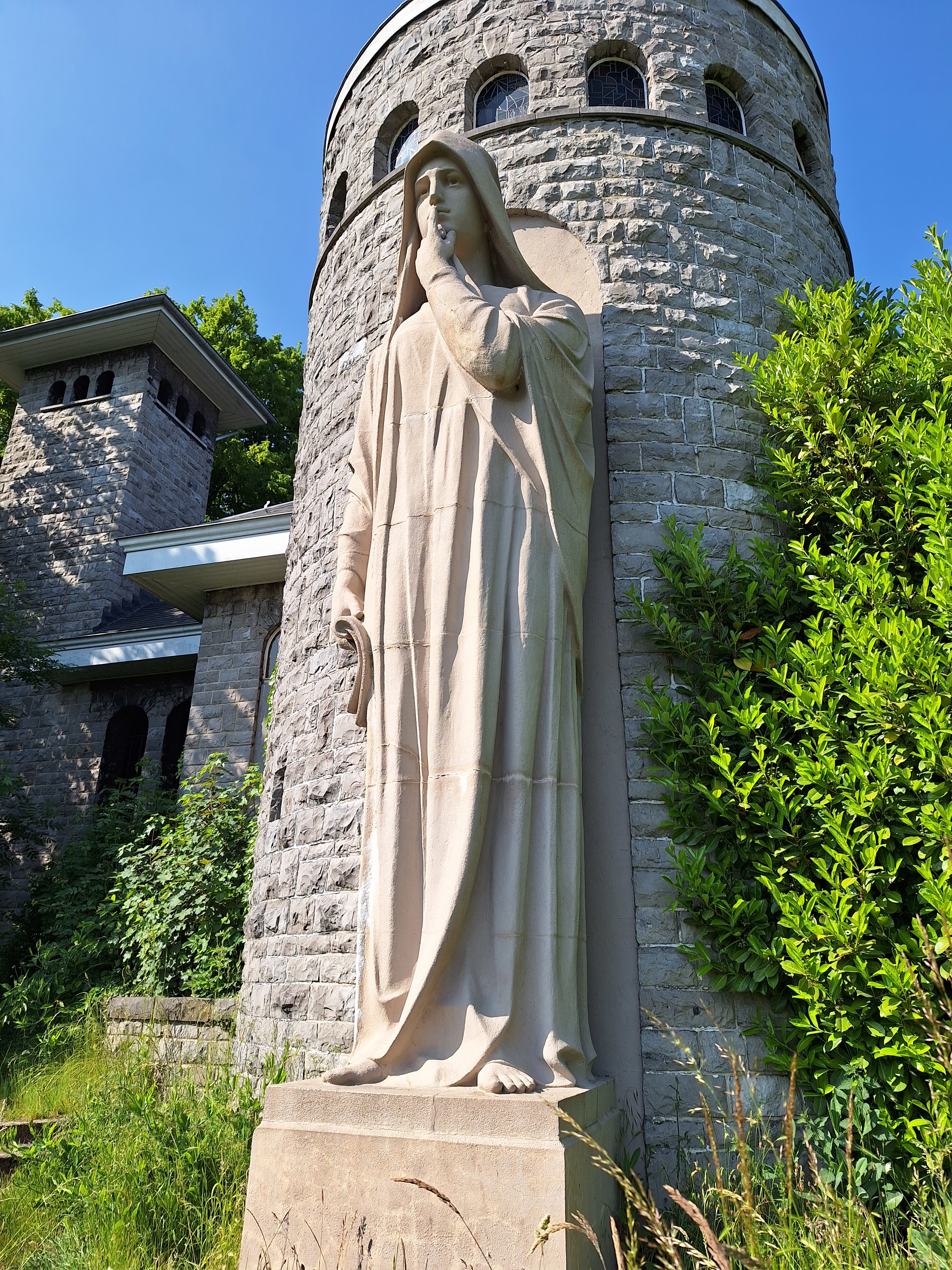
Chapel Saint-Maurice, statue of the Dame Blanche (White Lady) by Jules Brouns

The Dame Blanche network was founded in 1916 by Walthère Dewé, an engineer working in a telegraph and telephone company in Brussels. The decision was prompted by the arrest and execution of Dewé's cousin, Dieudonné Lambrecht, who had himself founded an intelligence network codenamed "Lambrecht". In order to save the group, Dewé took control and developed it under the name Dame Blanche, with the assistance of his friend Herman Chauvin.

The network was initially affiliated with the British military intelligence service of Cecil Aylmer Cameron via Folkestone. After persistent infiltration by agents working for Colonel Walter Nicolai and Abteilung III b, the German counterintelligence service, La Dame Blanche transferred its allegiance to the British Secret Service (later known as MI6) station in Rotterdam, where their new handler was Captain Henry Landau. After the war, Mansfield Smith-Cumming, head of the Secret Service, estimated that Dame Blanche had supplied as much as 70 percent of all military intelligence collected by Allied intelligence services worldwide, not just that from German-occupied Belgium and northern France.

By the end of the war, its 1,300 agents covered all of occupied Belgium, northern France and – through a collaboration with Louise de Bettignies' network – occupied Luxembourg. The network was known for its high proportion of female members; women may have made up as much as 30 percent of its total personnel.

During the second German occupation of Belgium in World War II, Dewé used the experience of the Dame Blanche network to start a new network, codenamed Clarence, to which several former members of Dame Blanche belonged. He was shot and killed while trying to avoid capture by the Germans in January 1944.

A monument to the Dame Blanche resistance organisation has been built near the city of Liège. It is the Chapelle Saint-Maurice (mémorial Walthère Dewé), Rue Coupée 94, Liège, Belgium.
