= Listed buildings in Petersfield =

Historic structures in Hempshire, England

Petersfield is a town and civil parish in the East Hampshire district of Hampshire, England. It contains two grade I, six grade II* and 109 grade II listed buildings that are recorded in the National Heritage List for England.

This list is based on the information retrieved online from Historic England.

== Key ==
Grade	Criteria
I	Buildings that are of exceptional interest
II*	Particularly important buildings of more than special interest
II	Buildings that are of special interest

== Listing ==
Name	Grade	Location	Type	Completed (Note: The date given is the date used by Historic England as significant for the initial building or that of an important part in the structure's description.)	Date designated	Grid ref. (Note: The grid reference is based on the British national grid reference system, sometimes known as OSGB36, used by the Ordnance Survey.) Geo-coordinates	Notes	Entry number (Note: The "List Entry Number" is a unique number assigned to each listed building and scheduled monument by Historic England.)	Image	Wikidata
Rushes Farmhouse	II	2, Bell Hill			19 February 1973	SU7407423820; 51°00′32″N 0°56′44″W		1339202	Upload Photo	Q26623471
Bell Hill Cottage	II	28, Bell Hill			19 February 1973	SU7399024481; 51°00′54″N 0°56′48″W		1093608	Upload Photo	Q26385945
Borough House	II	Borough Road			19 February 1973	SU7396723001; 51°00′06″N 0°56′50″W		1339203	Upload Photo	Q26623472
1, Chapel Street	II	1, Chapel Street			29 July 1949	SU7458923299; 51°00′15″N 0°56′18″W		1339224	Upload Photo	Q26623491
57, Chapel Street	II	57, Chapel Street			19 February 1973	SU7459423488; 51°00′21″N 0°56′18″W		1093569	57, Chapel Street More images	Q26385903
63 and 65, Chapel Street	II	63 and 65, Chapel Street			19 February 1973	SU7458323550; 51°00′23″N 0°56′18″W		1093570	Upload Photo	Q26385905
The Church Path Studio	II	Church Path			19 February 1973	SU7460723192; 51°00′12″N 0°56′17″W		1093571	Upload Photo	Q26385906
22 and 23, Church Path	II	22 and 23, Church Path			19 February 1973	SU7460723172; 51°00′11″N 0°56′17″W		1093572	Upload Photo	Q26385907
18, College Path	II	18, College Path			29 July 1949	SU7486123331; 51°00′16″N 0°56′04″W		1093574	Upload Photo	Q26385909
K6 Telephone Kiosk Outside United Reformed Church	II	College Street			23 May 1990	SU7490523606; 51°00′25″N 0°56′01″W		1339247	Upload Photo	Q26623512
The Old College	II*	College Street			29 July 1949	SU7491523619; 51°00′26″N 0°56′01″W		1301953	The Old College More images	Q17533290
Old Masonic Hall	II	College Street			19 February 1973	SU7490223274; 51°00′14″N 0°56′02″W		1179424	Upload Photo	Q26474082
The Red Lion Hotel	II	1, College Street			29 July 1949	SU7488323254; 51°00′14″N 0°56′03″W		1093577	The Red Lion Hotel More images	Q26385913
4-8, College Street	II	4-8, College Street			19 February 1973	SU7486223274; 51°00′14″N 0°56′04″W		1093573	Upload Photo	Q26385908
Cedar Cote	II	5, College Street			19 February 1973	SU7492123395; 51°00′18″N 0°56′01″W		1339226	Upload Photo	Q26623493
Fir Cottage	II	17, College Street			19 February 1973	SU7492423515; 51°00′22″N 0°56′01″W		1093578	Upload Photo	Q26385914
36 and 36a, College Street	II	36 and 36a, College Street			28 February 1979	SU7489323532; 51°00′23″N 0°56′02″W		1093536	Upload Photo	Q26385871
The Good Intent	II	40 and 42, College Street			19 February 1973	SU7488723570; 51°00′24″N 0°56′02″W		1093575	The Good Intent More images	Q26385911
48, College Street	II	48, College Street			19 February 1973	SU7488623602; 51°00′25″N 0°56′02″W		1093576	Upload Photo	Q26385912
50 and 52, College Street	II	50 and 52, College Street			29 July 1949	SU7488123613; 51°00′25″N 0°56′03″W		1339225	Upload Photo	Q26623492
Garden Walls to North and East of Dradon House Gazebo in Garden of Dragon House	II	Dragon Street			29 July 1949	SU7489523021; 51°00′06″N 0°56′02″W		1339228	Upload Photo	Q26623495
9 and 11, Dragon Street	II*	9 and 11, Dragon Street			29 July 1949	SU7480823104; 51°00′09″N 0°56′07″W		1339229	Upload Photo	Q17533453
13, Dragon Street	II	13, Dragon Street			29 July 1949	SU7480323093; 51°00′09″N 0°56′07″W		1179508	Upload Photo	Q26474196
14-18, Dragon Street	II	14-18, Dragon Street			29 July 1949	SU7484223118; 51°00′09″N 0°56′05″W		1179464	Upload Photo	Q26474121
The Sun Inn	II	20, Dragon Street			19 February 1973	SU7483323097; 51°00′09″N 0°56′06″W		1339227	The Sun Inn More images	Q26623494
The Varisty Cafe	II	22 and 24, Dragon Street			19 February 1973	SU7482723080; 51°00′08″N 0°56′06″W		1093580	The Varisty Cafe More images	Q26385916
Dragon House	II*	28, Dragon Street			29 July 1949	SU7482123064; 51°00′08″N 0°56′06″W		1179494	Dragon House More images	Q17533230
34 and 36, Dragon Street	II	34 and 36, Dragon Street			29 July 1949	SU7479723024; 51°00′06″N 0°56′07″W		1093581	Upload Photo	Q26385917
38, Dragon Street	II	38, Dragon Street			19 February 1973	SU7479023015; 51°00′06″N 0°56′08″W		1179500	Upload Photo	Q26474181
2 and 4, Dagon Street, 1 and 3, Heath Road	II	1 and 3, Heath Road			29 July 1949	SU7486923221; 51°00′13″N 0°56′04″W		1093579	Upload Photo	Q26385915
Border Cottage The Old Cottage	II	4, Heath Road			29 July 1949	SU7491523242; 51°00′13″N 0°56′01″W		1093583	Upload Photo	Q26385919
War Memorial	II	High Street			13 November 2001	SU7484323241; 51°00′13″N 0°56′05″W		1389498	War Memorial More images	Q26668932
Garden Wall to North of Winton House	II	High Street			19 February 1973	SU7477723297; 51°00′15″N 0°56′08″W		1093585	Upload Photo	Q26385921
6, High Street	II	6, High Street			19 February 1973	SU7471923274; 51°00′14″N 0°56′11″W		1179543	Upload Photo	Q26474262
Lymmdum House	II	12, High Street			29 July 1949	SU7474823270; 51°00′14″N 0°56′10″W		1093584	Upload Photo	Q26385920
15, High Street	II	15, High Street			29 July 1949	SU7474623242; 51°00′13″N 0°56′10″W		1179524	Upload Photo	Q26474230
16, High Street	II	16, High Street			19 February 1973	SU7476723267; 51°00′14″N 0°56′09″W		1339231	Upload Photo	Q26623497
17 and 19, High Street	II	17 and 19, High Street			29 July 1949	SU7476123239; 51°00′13″N 0°56′09″W		1339230	Upload Photo	Q26623496
Winton House, YWCA	II	18, High Street			29 July 1949	SU7477923265; 51°00′14″N 0°56′08″W		1179563	Upload Photo	Q26474298
20, High Street	II	20, High Street			19 February 1973	SU7479123264; 51°00′14″N 0°56′08″W		1093586	Upload Photo	Q26385922
22, High Street	II	22, High Street			19 February 1973	SU7480223263; 51°00′14″N 0°56′07″W		1179574	Upload Photo	Q26474317
24, High Street	II	24, High Street			29 July 1949	SU7481223263; 51°00′14″N 0°56′07″W		1339232	Upload Photo	Q26623498
26, 28 and 28a, High Street	II	26, 28 and 28a, High Street			19 February 1973	SU7482323258; 51°00′14″N 0°56′06″W		1301878	Upload Photo	Q26589089
34, High Street	II	34, High Street			19 February 1973	SU7485123255; 51°00′14″N 0°56′05″W		1093587	Upload Photo	Q26385923
36, High Street	II	36, High Street			19 February 1973	SU7488023236; 51°00′13″N 0°56′03″W		1339233	Upload Photo	Q26623499
17, Hylton Road	II	17, Hylton Road			29 July 1949	SU7462023123; 51°00′10″N 0°56′16″W		1179627	Upload Photo	Q26474415
19, Hylton Road	II	19, Hylton Road			29 July 1949	SU7460823128; 51°00′10″N 0°56′17″W		1093588	Upload Photo	Q26385924
21, Hylton Road	II	21, Hylton Road			19 February 1973	SU7456323148; 51°00′10″N 0°56′19″W		1179645	Upload Photo	Q26474446
Non Conformist Cemetery Chapel at Petersfield Cemetery	II	Petersfield Cemetery			6 February 2004	SU7495623936; 51°00′36″N 0°55′59″W		1390794	Upload Photo	Q26670172
Church of England Cemetery Chapel at Petersfield Cemetery	II	Petersfield Cemetery			6 February 2004	SU7493323902; 51°00′35″N 0°56′00″W		1390795	Church of England Cemetery Chapel at Petersfield Cemetery More images	Q26670173
Cliff Cotttage	II	Ramshill			19 February 1973	SU7510823780; 51°00′31″N 0°55′51″W		1093549	Upload Photo	Q26385885
Shirtles	II	Reservoir Lane, Sheet			19 February 1973	SU7475524477; 51°00′53″N 0°56′09″W		1093551	Upload Photo	Q26385887
Chapel Cottage	II	Russell Way			19 February 1973	SU7533222575; 50°59′52″N 0°55′40″W		1093553	Upload Photo	Q26385889
Mallards Mere	II	15, Russell Way, GU31 4LD			19 February 1973	SU7539722480; 50°59′48″N 0°55′37″W		1093554	Upload Photo	Q26385890
2, Sheep Street	II	2, Sheep Street			19 July 1949	SU7461523210; 51°00′12″N 0°56′17″W		1179815	Upload Photo	Q26474730
4-8, Sheep Street	II	4-8, Sheep Street			19 February 1973	SU7460323203; 51°00′12″N 0°56′17″W		1093556	Upload Photo	Q26385892
10 and 12, Sheep Street	II	10 and 12, Sheep Street			19 February 1973	SU7459323197; 51°00′12″N 0°56′18″W		1093557	Upload Photo	Q26385893
14 and 16, Sheep Street	II	14 and 16, Sheep Street			19 February 1973	SU7458623193; 51°00′12″N 0°56′18″W		1179843	Upload Photo	Q26474782
18, Sheep Street	II	18, Sheep Street			19 February 1973	SU7457623189; 51°00′12″N 0°56′19″W		1339216	Upload Photo	Q26623484
20-24, Sheep Street	II	20-24, Sheep Street			29 July 1949	SU7456523183; 51°00′12″N 0°56′19″W		1179849	20-24, Sheep Street More images	Q26474794
26, Sheep Street	II	26, Sheep Street			19 February 1973	SU7455423178; 51°00′11″N 0°56′20″W		1093558	26, Sheep Street More images	Q26385894
2 and 4, St Peter's Road	II	2 and 4, St Peter's Road			19 February 1973	SU7469123191; 51°00′12″N 0°56′13″W		1093555	Upload Photo	Q26385891
The Fruit Basket	II	2a, St Peter's Road			19 February 1973	SU7468823199; 51°00′12″N 0°56′13″W		1339254	Upload Photo	Q26623519
12, St Peter's Road	II	12, St Peter's Road			19 February 1973	SU7477923157; 51°00′11″N 0°56′08″W		1339215	Upload Photo	Q26623483
Catholic Church of Saint Laurence	II	Station Road			19 February 1973	SU7450623605; 51°00′25″N 0°56′22″W		1339241	Catholic Church of Saint Laurence More images	Q26623506
Petersfield Signal Box	II	Station Road			18 September 2013	SU7440923616; 51°00′26″N 0°56′27″W		1415912	Petersfield Signal Box More images	Q26676474
84, Station Road	II	84, Station Road			19 February 1973	SU7498423680; 51°00′27″N 0°55′57″W		1093523	Upload Photo	Q26385859
Outbuilding to North West of No 86	II	86, Station Road			19 February 1973	SU7499323692; 51°00′28″N 0°55′57″W		1093525	Upload Photo	Q26385861
Gatepiers and Railings in Front of No 86	II	86, Station Road			29 July 1949	SU7500323679; 51°00′27″N 0°55′56″W		1339242	Upload Photo	Q26623507
Oaklea	II	86, Station Road			29 July 1949	SU7500223685; 51°00′28″N 0°55′56″W		1093524	Upload Photo	Q26385860
Garden Walls to Heath Cottage and Wych Elm Cottage	II	Sussex Road			19 February 1973	SU7500722837; 51°00′00″N 0°55′57″W		1093532	Upload Photo	Q26385867
Heath Farmhouse	II	Sussex Road			19 February 1973	SU7569922461; 50°59′48″N 0°55′22″W		1093533	Upload Photo	Q26385868
Heath Cottage Wych Cottage	II	Sussex Road			29 July 1949	SU7499022845; 51°00′00″N 0°55′58″W		1157518	Upload Photo	Q26451289
Garden Walls, Piers And Railings To West And South Of No 32, 32	II	Sussex Road			19 February 1973	SU7497122839; 51°00′00″N 0°55′59″W		1339243	Upload Photo	Q26623508
4 and 6, Sussex Road	II	4 and 6, Sussex Road			19 February 1973	SU7477722961; 51°00′04″N 0°56′09″W		1093526	Upload Photo	Q26385862
8-12, Sussex Road	II	8-12, Sussex Road			19 February 1973	SU7479022946; 51°00′04″N 0°56′08″W		1093527	Upload Photo	Q26385863
18, Sussex Road	II	18, Sussex Road			19 February 1973	SU7481622924; 51°00′03″N 0°56′07″W		1093528	Upload Photo	Q26385864
20, Sussex Road	II	20, Sussex Road			19 February 1973	SU7482322917; 51°00′03″N 0°56′06″W		1093529	Upload Photo	Q26385865
22, 24 and 26, Sussex Road	II	22, 24 and 26, Sussex Road			19 February 1973	SU7486922890; 51°00′02″N 0°56′04″W		1093530	Upload Photo	Q26385866
Heath Lodge	II*	32, Sussex Road			19 July 1949	SU7497322857; 51°00′01″N 0°55′59″W		1093531	Upload Photo	Q17532819
141-145, Sussex Road	II	141-145, Sussex Road			19 February 1973	SU7554821990; 50°59′32″N 0°55′30″W		1301561	Upload Photo	Q26588799
36-42, Swan Street	II	36-42, Swan Street			19 February 1973	SU7442023310; 51°00′16″N 0°56′27″W		1339244	Upload Photo	Q26623509
Barn at Causeway Farm Dairy	II	The Causeway			19 February 1973	SU7459722576; 50°59′52″N 0°56′18″W		1339204	Upload Photo	Q26623473
The Grange	II	The Causeway			29 July 1949	SU7462022962; 51°00′04″N 0°56′17″W		1093609	Upload Photo	Q26385946
Causeway Farmhouse	II	The Causeway			29 July 1949	SU7415322329; 50°59′44″N 0°56′41″W		1093568	Upload Photo	Q26385902
211, The Causeway	II	211, The Causeway			19 February 1973	SU7380822163; 50°59′39″N 0°56′59″W		1093610	Upload Photo	Q26385947
Coach House to East of Spain House, Adjoining No 3 Wall To Carriage Gate	II	The Spain			19 February 1973	SU7452823187; 51°00′12″N 0°56′21″W		1339218	Upload Photo	Q26623486
1, The Spain	II	1, The Spain			19 February 1973	SU7453923189; 51°00′12″N 0°56′21″W		1093559	Upload Photo	Q26385895
2a, The Spain	II	2a, The Spain			19 February 1973	SU7455023176; 51°00′11″N 0°56′20″W		1339219	Upload Photo	Q26623487
4, The Spain	II	4, The Spain			19 February 1973	SU7454223158; 51°00′11″N 0°56′20″W		1301695	Upload Photo	Q26588924
Spain House	II	5, The Spain			19 February 1973	SU7451423193; 51°00′12″N 0°56′22″W		1179877	Upload Photo	Q26474843
Moreton House School	II	6, The Spain			19 February 1973	SU7451623145; 51°00′10″N 0°56′22″W		1093562	Upload Photo	Q26385898
7, The Spain	II	7, The Spain			29 July 1949	SU7450323195; 51°00′12″N 0°56′22″W		1093560	Upload Photo	Q26385896
8 and 10, The Spain	II	8 and 10, The Spain			29 July 1949	SU7449623150; 51°00′11″N 0°56′23″W		1179959	Upload Photo	Q26474980
9, The Spain	II	9, The Spain			19 February 1973	SU7449023199; 51°00′12″N 0°56′23″W		1179930	9, The Spain More images	Q26474933
15, The Spain	II	15, The Spain			19 February 1973	SU7445523225; 51°00′13″N 0°56′25″W		1093561	Upload Photo	Q26385897
Goodyers	II*	24, The Spain			19 July 1949	SU7446823172; 51°00′11″N 0°56′24″W		1339220	Goodyers More images	Q17533443
Tullys	II	26, The Spain			19 February 1973	SU7447523186; 51°00′12″N 0°56′24″W		1093563	Tullys More images	Q26385899
30, The Spain	II	30, The Spain			19 February 1973	SU7442823203; 51°00′12″N 0°56′26″W		1180049	Upload Photo	Q26475116
Statue of William III	I	The Square			29 July 1949	SU7465123247; 51°00′14″N 0°56′15″W		1093567	Statue of William III More images	Q17528308
Church of St Peter	I	The Square			29 July 1949	SU7464823187; 51°00′12″N 0°56′15″W		1157381	Church of St Peter More images	Q7595273
K6 Telephone Kiosk Outside Post Office	II	The Square			23 May 1990	SU7461923258; 51°00′14″N 0°56′16″W		1253303	Upload Photo	Q26545066
K6 Telephone Kiosk	II	The Square			30 August 1988	SU7463323218; 51°00′13″N 0°56′16″W		1253295	K6 Telephone Kiosk More images	Q26545059
1, The Square	II*	1, The Square			29 July 1949	SU7459723298; 51°00′15″N 0°56′18″W		1093564	1, The Square More images	Q17532831
2 and 3, The Square	II	2 and 3, The Square			19 February 1973	SU7460923299; 51°00′15″N 0°56′17″W		1180066	Upload Photo	Q26475146
Lloyds Bank	II	5, The Square			29 July 1949	SU7462423300; 51°00′15″N 0°56′16″W		1339221	Upload Photo	Q26623488
9, The Square	II	9, The Square			20 June 1988	SU7465623278; 51°00′15″N 0°56′15″W		1093537	Upload Photo	Q26385873
11 and 12, The Square	II	11 and 12, The Square			19 February 1973	SU7467723276; 51°00′15″N 0°56′13″W		1093565	Upload Photo	Q26385900
18, The Square	II	18, The Square			29 July 1949	SU7468123227; 51°00′13″N 0°56′13″W		1157307	18, The Square More images	Q26451093
19, The Square	II	19, The Square			19 February 1973	SU7468123218; 51°00′13″N 0°56′13″W		1339222	Upload Photo	Q26623489
The Market Inn	II	20, The Square			19 February 1973	SU7467023211; 51°00′12″N 0°56′14″W		1093566	The Market Inn More images	Q26385901
24, The Square	II	24, The Square			29 July 1949	SU7462823215; 51°00′13″N 0°56′16″W		1339223	24, The Square More images	Q26623490
Stable and Cowshed Attached to Barn at Buckmore Farm	II	Winchester Road			4 December 1990	SU7364723892; 51°00′35″N 0°57′06″W		1339248	Upload Photo	Q26623513
Barn at Buckmore Farm to North West of Farmhouse	II	Winchester Road			4 December 1990	SU7366823909; 51°00′35″N 0°57′05″W		1093538	Upload Photo	Q26385874
Buckmore Farmhouse with Attached Cartshed and Privy	II	Winchester Road			4 December 1990	SU7369423884; 51°00′35″N 0°57′03″W		1261844	Upload Photo	Q26552765
10, Winchester Road	II	10, Winchester Road			19 February 1973	SU7413623762; 51°00′31″N 0°56′41″W		1093535	Upload Photo	Q26385870
The Square	II				29 July 1949	SU7462323214; 51°00′13″N 0°56′16″W		1157414	Upload Photo	Q26451194

== See also ==
- Grade I listed buildings in Hampshire
- Grade II* listed buildings in Hampshire
