= Aylmer Cameron =

Recipient of the Victoria Cross

Colonel Aylmer Cameron VC CB
- Born: 12 August 1833; Perth, Scotland
- Died: 10 June 1909 (aged 75); Alverstoke, Hampshire
- Burial place: St Mark's Churchyard, Highcliffe
- Relatives: General Sir William Gordon Cameron (brother); Cecil Aylmer Cameron (son)
- Military career
- Allegiance: United Kingdom
- Branch: British Army
- Rank: Colonel
- Units: 72nd Highlanders; King's Own Scottish Borderers
- Commands: Royal Military College, Sandhurst
- Conflicts: Crimean War; Indian Mutiny
- Awards: Victoria Cross; Order of the Bath

Colonel Aylmer Spicer Cameron VC CB (12 August 1833 – 10 June 1909) was a British Army officer and recipient of the Victoria Cross, the highest and most prestigious award for gallantry in the face of the enemy that can be awarded to British and Commonwealth forces.

== Life ==
Cameron was born in Christchurch, Hampshire on 12 August 1833 into a military family. He was the son of Colonel William Gordon Cameron, Grenadier Guards, and grandson of General William Neville Cameron of the East India Company's service. He had four brothers in the Army and Navy, including General Sir William Gordon Cameron. Four of his five sons served in the armed forces, including Major Cecil Aylmer Cameron. His daughter, Esme Gordon, married Vice Admiral Joseph Charles Walrond Henley, CB.

Aylmer Cameron was commissioned as an Ensign in the 72nd Highlanders, British Army, on 9 July 1852, and promoted to Lieutenant in August 1854. He took part in the Crimean War and was present at the siege of Sebastopol in 1855, before going to India after the outbreak of the Indian Mutiny in 1857.

He was a member of the Bath and County Club.

=== VC action ===
Cameron was 24 years old, and a lieutenant in the 72nd Highlanders during the Indian Mutiny when the following deed took place on 30 March 1858 at Kotah, India for which he was awarded the VC:

For conspicuous bravery on the 30th of March, 1858, at Kotah, in having headed a small party of men, and attacked a body of armed fanatic rebels, strongly posted in a loop-holed house, with one narrow entrance. Lieutenant Cameron stormed the house, and killed three rebels in single combat. He was severely wounded, having lost half of one hand by a stroke from a tulwar.

In addition to receiving the VC, for his services in India Cameron was twice mentioned in dispatches and, in December 1859, was promoted to captain.

=== Later service ===
In June 1871 Cameron was promoted to major in the King’s Own Scottish Borderers (25th Foot), becoming a lieutenant-colonel in October 1877 and colonel in July 1881. He served as a staff officer in Canada from 1879 to 1881, and commanded the 2nd Battalion King’s Own Scottish Borderers from July 1881 to 1883. He was chief of the Intelligence Branch at Army Headquarters from 1883 to 1886, and Commandant of the Royal Military College, Sandhurst from 1886 to 1888. He was made a Companion of the Order of the Bath in May 1886, and retired in August 1888.

He died, after a long period of ill-health, on 10 June 1909 aged 75, and is buried in St Mark's Churchyard, Highcliffe, Dorset.

== The medal ==
His Victoria Cross is displayed at the Regimental Museum of Queens Own Highlanders in Fort George, Highland, Scotland.

Military offices
Preceded by Frederick Solly-Flood	Commandant of the Royal Military College Sandhurst; 1886–1888	Succeeded by Edward Clive (as Governor and Commandant); Spencer Edward Orr (as Assistant Commandant and Secretary)
