= Petersfield Festival Hall and Town Hall =

Municipal building in Petersfield, Hampshire, England

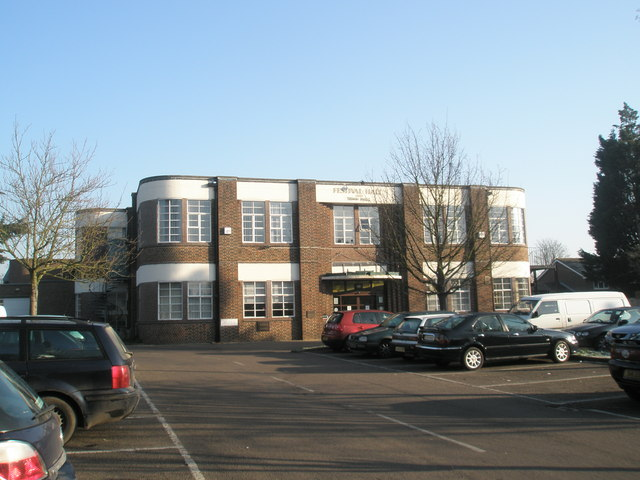
- The building in 2008

- Shown in Hampshire
- 51.0039°N 0.9324°W
- Location: Heath Road, Petersfield

History
- Built: 1935

Site notes
- Architect: Seely & Paget
- Architectural style: Art Deco style

Petersfield Festival Hall and Town Hall is a municipal building in Heath Road in Petersfield, a town in Hampshire, in England. It hosts the annual Petersfield Musical Festival.

== History ==
The first municipal building in the town was a town hall in the Market Square which was completed in 1780, and reconstructed in 1826. The town hall was the meeting place of the borough council until the borough was abolished under the Municipal Corporations Act 1883. The right of the borough council to elect members of parliament, usually resulting in the lord of the manor, Sir William Jolliffe, being selected, was removed under the Redistribution of Seats Act 1885, and the town hall, which had become dilapidated as well as redundant, was demolished in 1898.

A corn exchange had been erected on the corner of the High Street and the Market Square in 1866 and, after use of the building declined significantly in the wake of the Great depression of British agriculture in the late 19th century, it was re-purposed as a venue for public meetings, theatrical performances and concerts. However, by the 1920's, it was inadequate for that purpose and it was converted into shops in 1929.

In 1933, a local art dealer, Marie Brahms, wrote to the local newspaper complaining about the lack of a public events venue. The matter attracted the support of a local philanthropist, Harry Roberts, who launched a campaign to raise funds to provide a home for the Petersfield Music Festival, as well as dedicated offices for Petersfield Urban District Council. The site he selected for the new building was open land on the north side of Heath Road. The new building was designed by Seely & Paget in the Art Deco style, built by Messrs. Rigg and Remington of Westminster in red brick at a cost of £5,500, and it was officially opened on 6 October 1935.

The Petersfield Musical Festival continued to be held each year and operated under the conductorship of Adrian Boult until 1945, and under Sydney Watson, Richard Seal and Mark Deller among others, thereafter. The building also served as the offices of Petersfield Urban District Council for the next four decades, but ceased to be the local seat of government when East Hampshire District Council was formed at Penns Place in Durford Road in 1974.

A small hall was added to the side in 1975, followed by a block of dressing rooms constructed to a design by Kenneth Claxton in 1979. In 1987, the building was extended on the north side, creating a new foyer, a new bar, toilets, a green room, and a meeting room. In 2008, a fire damaged much of the first floor, but the damaged area was soon restored. In 2017, plans were drawn up for a remodelling of the building. In 2023 plans were announced to renovate the outdated council chamber ahead of the larger planned refurbishment (as this renovation does not require planning permission to undertake), but the plans were put on hold in 2024 after the building contractor chosen ceased trading. Planning consent for the development was granted in October 2024.

== Architecture ==
The two-storey building is constructed of brick, with concrete floors extended through to show as bands. It has steel framed windows and a flat roof covered with felt. The council chamber was originally on the first floor, but was later relocated to the ground floor, to improve access. The main hall is 92 feet (28 m) by 45 feet (14 m).
