= Loftus Jones =

English navy commander (1879–1916)

Commander Loftus Jones VC
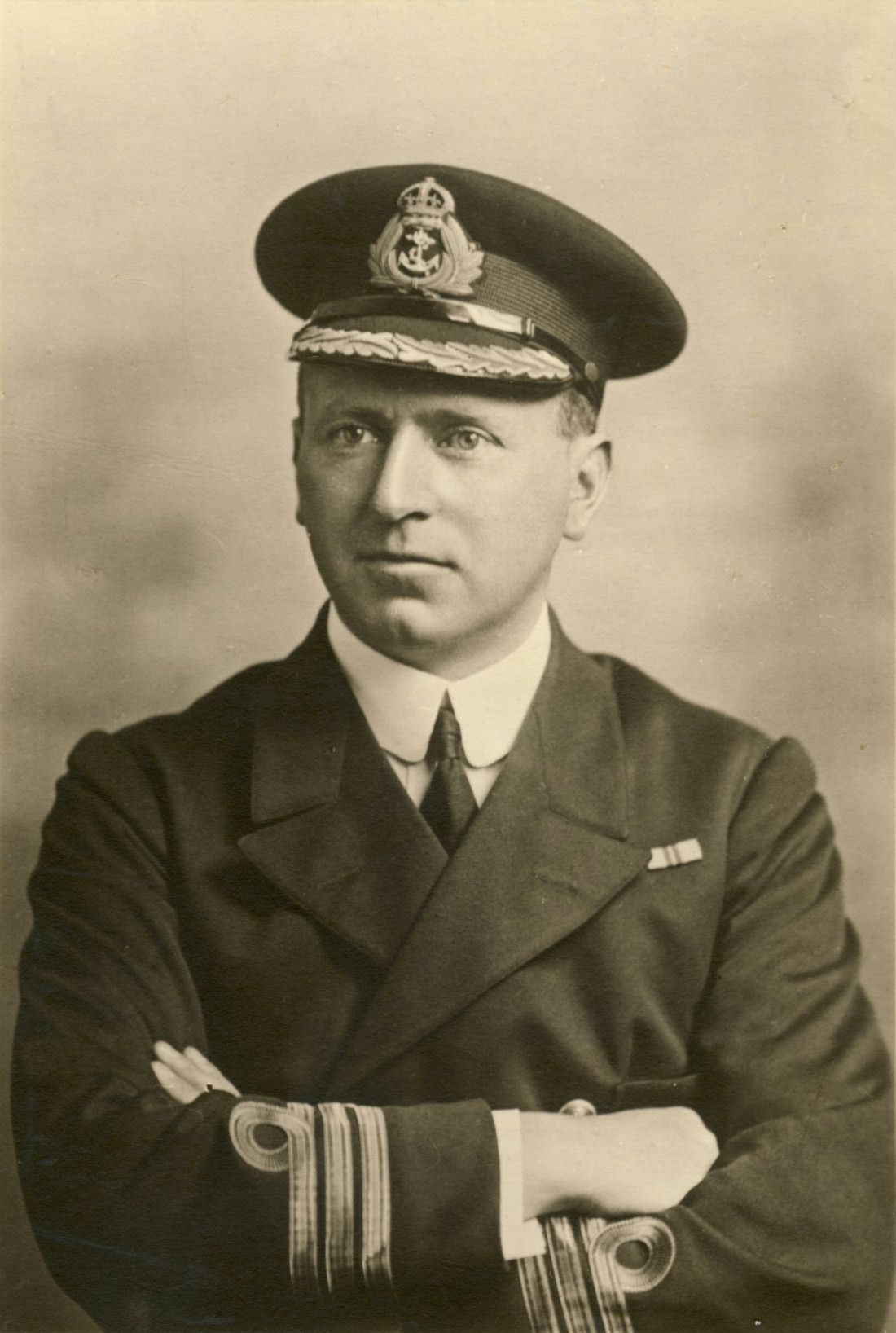
- Born: 13 November 1879; Southsea, Hampshire, England
- Died: 31 May 1916 (aged 36); HMS Shark, North Sea
- Burial place: Kviberg Cemetery, Gothenburg, Sweden
- Military career
- Allegiance: United Kingdom
- Branch: Royal Navy
- Service years: 1896–1916 †
- Rank: Commander
- Commands: HMS Sparrowhawk; HMS Success; HMS Shark
- Conflicts: World War I: Naval campaign; North Sea campaign; Battle of Jutland †
- Awards: Victoria Cross

Commander Loftus William Jones VC (13 November 1879 – 31 May 1916) was an English recipient of the Victoria Cross, the highest and most prestigious award for gallantry in the face of the enemy that can be awarded to British and Commonwealth forces.

== Naval career ==
Born 13 November 1879 in Southsea to Admiral Loftus Francis Jones and Gertrude (née Gray), of Petersfield, Hampshire, Jones was educated at Eastman's Royal Naval Academy. He was appointed as a sub-lieutenant to HMS Spiteful in 1901. Promoted to lieutenant on 1 April 1902, he was appointed later that year to HMS Tamar, shore station at Hong Kong, for service on destroyers in reserve at the China Station. He rose to become a commander in the Royal Navy aboard HMS Shark during the First World War.

Jones was 36 years old, on 31 May 1916, at the Battle of Jutland when he performed an act of bravery for which he was awarded the Victoria Cross. Jones went down with his ship.

=== Citation ===
On the afternoon of the 31st May, 1916, during the action, Commander Jones in HMS Shark, Torpedo Boat Destroyer, led a division of Destroyers to attack the enemy Battle Cruiser Squadron. In the course of this attack a shell hit the Shark's bridge, putting the steering gear out of order, and very shortly afterwards another shell disabled the main engines, leaving the vessel helpless. The Commanding Officer of another Destroyer, seeing the Shark's plight, came between her and the enemy and offered assistance, but was warned by Commander Jones not to run the risk of being almost certainly sunk in trying to help him. Commander Jones, though wounded in the leg, went aft to help connect and man the after wheel. Meanwhile the forecastle gun with its crew had been blown away, and the same fate soon afterwards befell the after gun and crew. Commander Jones then went to the midship and the only remaining gun, and personally assisted in keeping it in action. All this time the Shark was subjected to very heavy fire from enemy light cruisers and destroyers at short range. The gun's crew of the midship gun was reduced to three, of whom an Able Seaman was soon badly wounded in the leg. A few minutes later Commander Jones was hit by a shell, which took off his leg above the knee, but he continued to give orders to his gun's crew, while a Chief Stoker improvised a tourniquet round his thigh. Noticing that the Ensign was not properly hoisted, he gave orders for another to be hoisted. Soon afterwards, seeing that the ship could not survive much longer, and as a German Destroyer was closing, he gave orders for the surviving members of the crew to put on lifebelts. Almost immediately after this order had been given, the Shark was struck by a torpedo and sank. Commander Jones was unfortunately not amongst the few survivors from the Shark who were picked up by a neutral vessel in the night.

— The London Gazette, 6 March 1917

Commander Jones' body was washed ashore in Western Sweden some days after the battle. He was originally buried at Fiskebäckskil, Västra Götaland, Sweden. His body was transferred to the British War Graves plot in Kviberg Cemetery, Gothenburg in 1961.

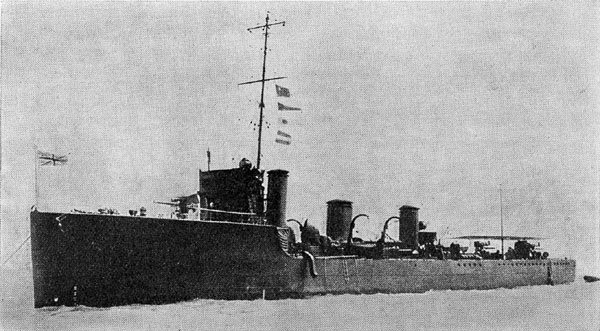
HMS Shark

== The medal ==
His medal was purchased by Lord Ashcroft in 2012 and is on display at the Imperial War Museum's Victoria Cross and George Cross gallery in London.

== Home town memorial ==
There is a memorial to him outside St Peter's Church, Petersfield.

== See also ==
- Monuments to Courage (David Harvey, 1999)
- The Register of the Victoria Cross (This England, 1997)
- VCs of the First World War - The Naval VCs (Stephen Snelling, 2002)
