= Petersfield =

Market town in Hampshire, England

Coordinates: 51.0038°N 0.9374°W

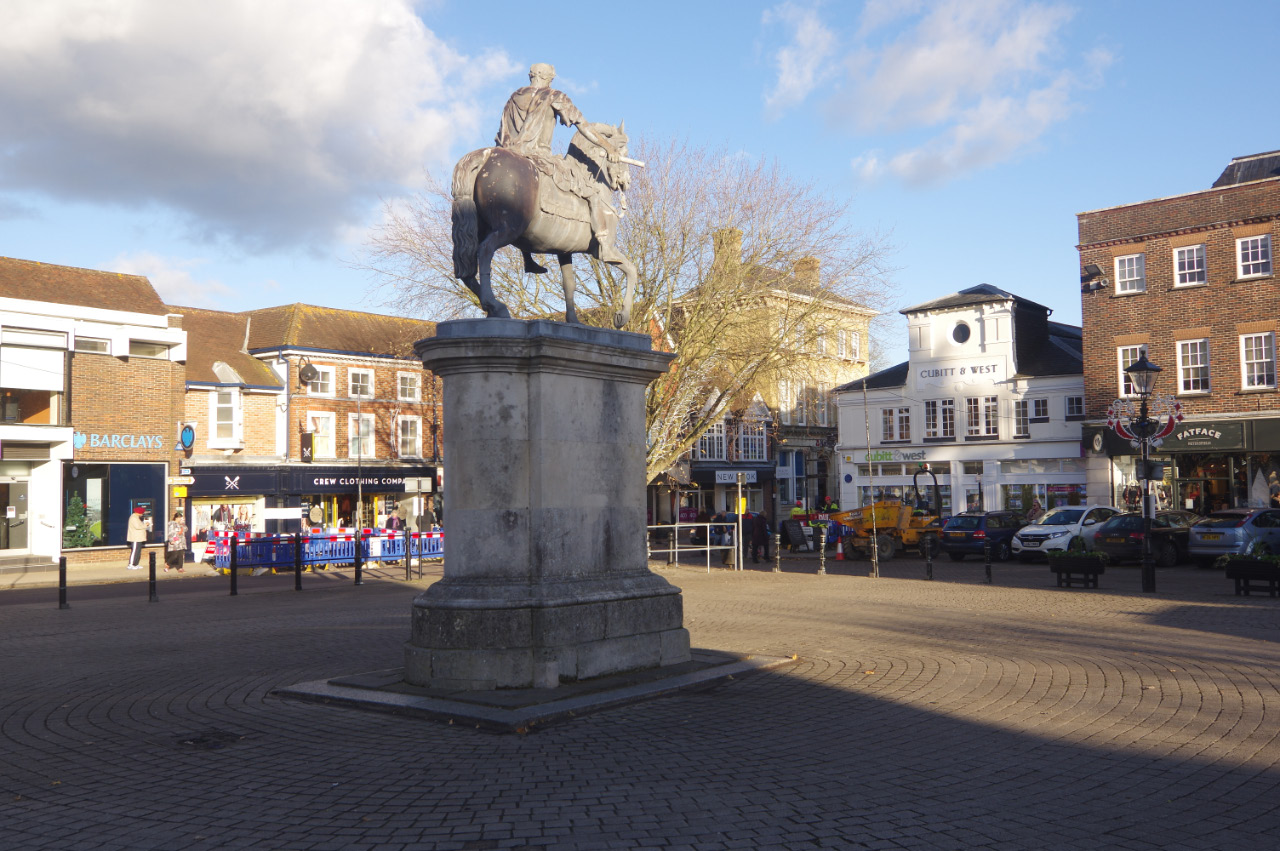
- Petersfield High Street

- Flag

- Location within Hampshire
- Population: 14,820 (2021 census)
- OS grid reference: SU748232
- Civil parish: Petersfield
- District: East Hampshire
- Shire county: Hampshire
- Region: South East
- Country: England
- Sovereign state: United Kingdom
- Post town: Petersfield
- Postcode district: GU31, GU32
- Dialling code: 01730
- Police: Hampshire and Isle of Wight
- Fire: Hampshire and Isle of Wight
- Ambulance: South Central
- UK Parliament: East Hampshire

Petersfield is a market town and civil parish in the East Hampshire district of Hampshire, England. It is 15 miles (24 km) north of Portsmouth. The town has its own railway station on the Portsmouth Direct line, the mainline rail link connecting Portsmouth and London Waterloo. Situated below the northern slopes of the South Downs, Petersfield lies wholly within the South Downs National Park.

The town is on the crossroads of well-used north–south (formerly the A3 road which now bypasses the town) and east–west routes (today the A272 road) and it grew as a coach stop on the Portsmouth to London route. Petersfield is twinned with Barentin in France, and Warendorf in Germany.

== History ==
Petersfield Heath's burial mounds may be up to 4,000 years old; their distribution is mainly to the east and south east of the Heath. These are considered to be one of the more important lowland barrow groups in this country. The barrows indicate that the area of the Heath was occupied by people who may have come to regard this area as sacred to their religion. As yet no trace has been confirmed for the dwellings of these people as the structures would have been wooden but Petersfield Museum hosts a community project to throw more light on this period of history.

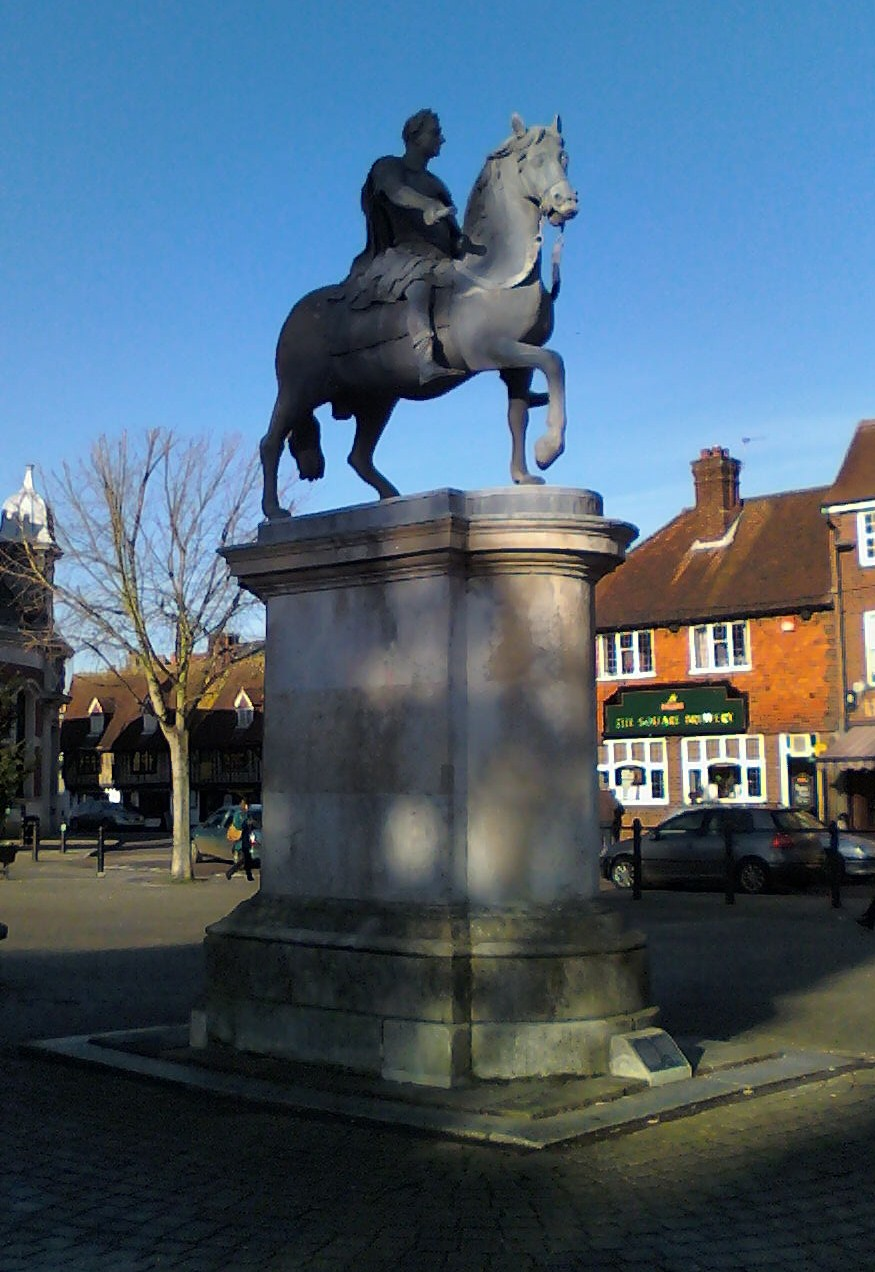
The statue of King William III in The Square

The town was founded during the 12th century by William FitzRobert, 2nd Earl of Gloucester, later chartered by his widow, Hawise de Beaumont, and confirmed by charter in 1198 from "John, Count of Mortain" (later to be King John). In 1415 King Henry V granted the burgesses of Petersfield freedom from toll, stallage, picage, pannage, murage, and pontage throughout the realm of England. All charters are preserved in the archive files at Petersfield Town Council.

The town grew in prosperity due to its position on frequently travelled routes, local sheep farming, and cottage industries including leather and cloth. There were weekly markets in the town square for sheep, horse and cattle trading, and two annual fairs, in June (on the feast of St Peter and St Paul) and November (on the feast of St Andrew). An autumn fair which began in the early 19th century was held in October on The Heath, called "The Taro Fair".

The town's market square has an 18th-century equestrian statue of King William III by John Cheere. The king is mounted and the statue is on an engraved plinth. It is one of only five statues of William in the United Kingdom outside Northern Ireland (the others being in Glasgow, Brixham, Hull and Bristol) and, as such, attracts bands of marching Orangemen in mid-July to commemorate William's victory at the Battle of the Boyne.

== Geography ==
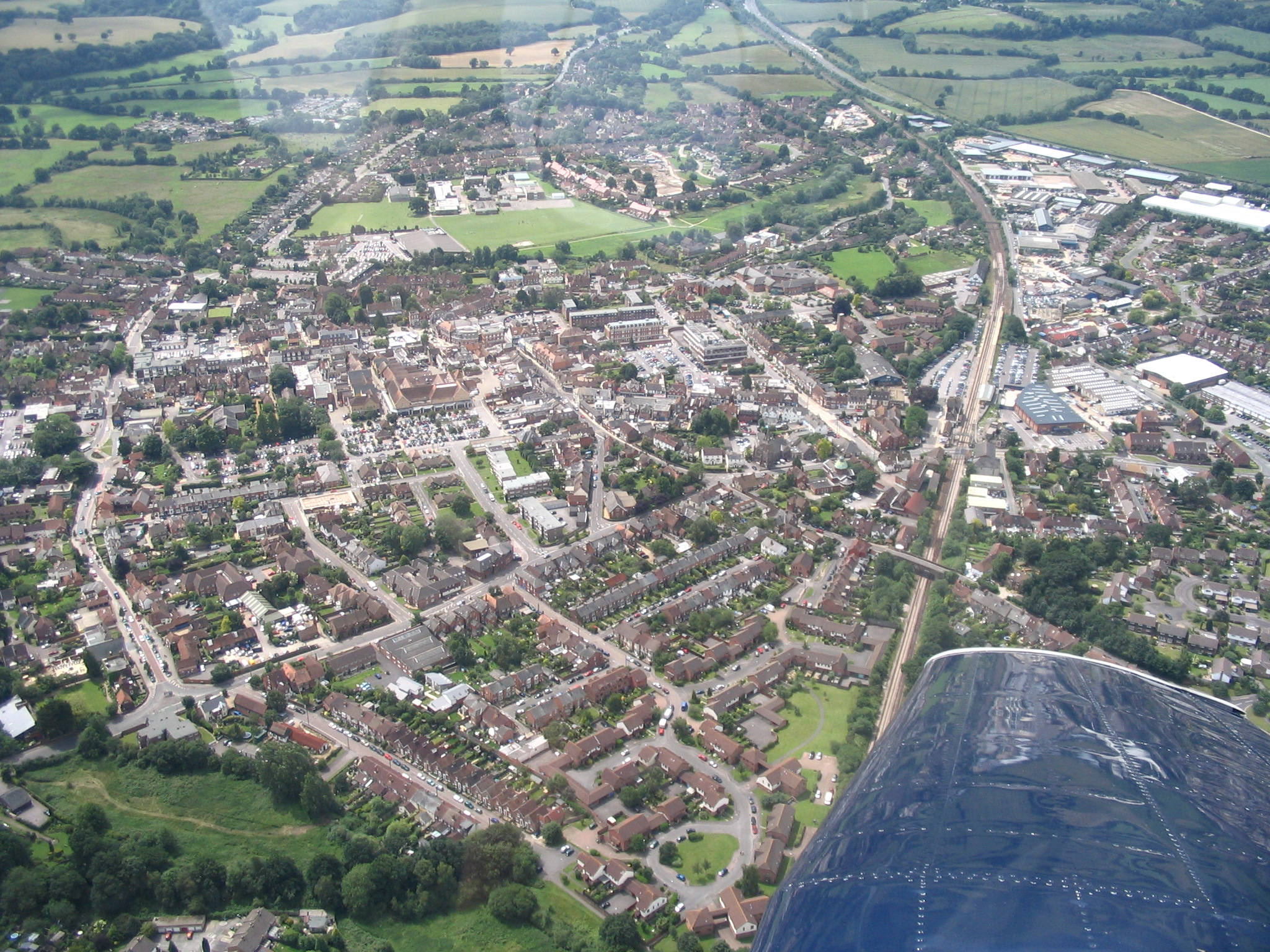
Aerial view from NE with railway (r) and College St (l)

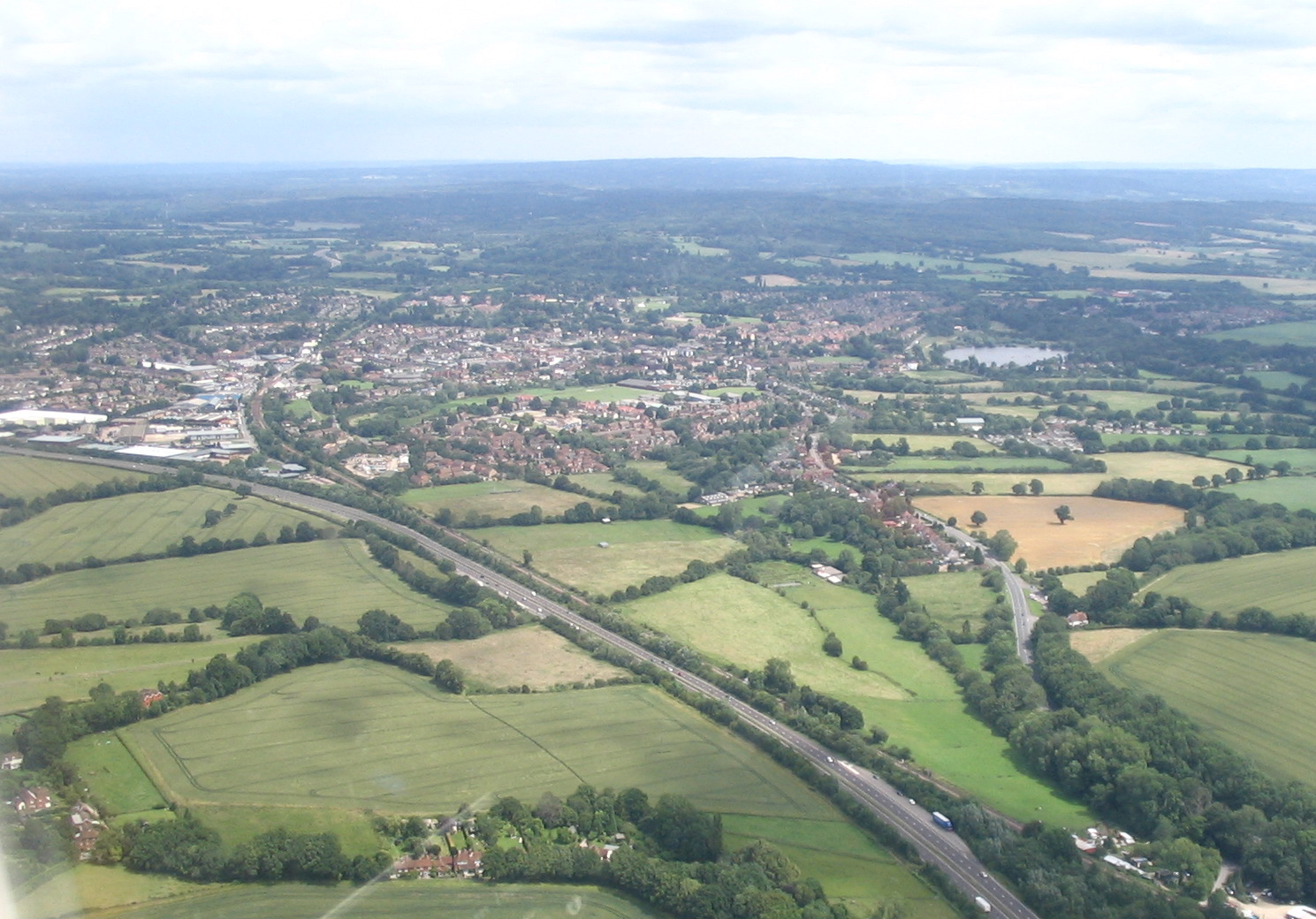
Aerial view from SW with the A3 in the foreground

Petersfield is situated in the valley of the Western Rother, on the Lower Greensand at the northern edge of the South Downs. The town lies at the western end of the Greensand Ridge, a sandstone ridge running through Hampshire, Surrey and Kent.

The town is surrounded on all sides by farmed countryside, with the South Downs south of the town, the Hampshire Downs to the west, and forested hills, including Durford Wood, to the north east.

The town is in the South Downs National Park.

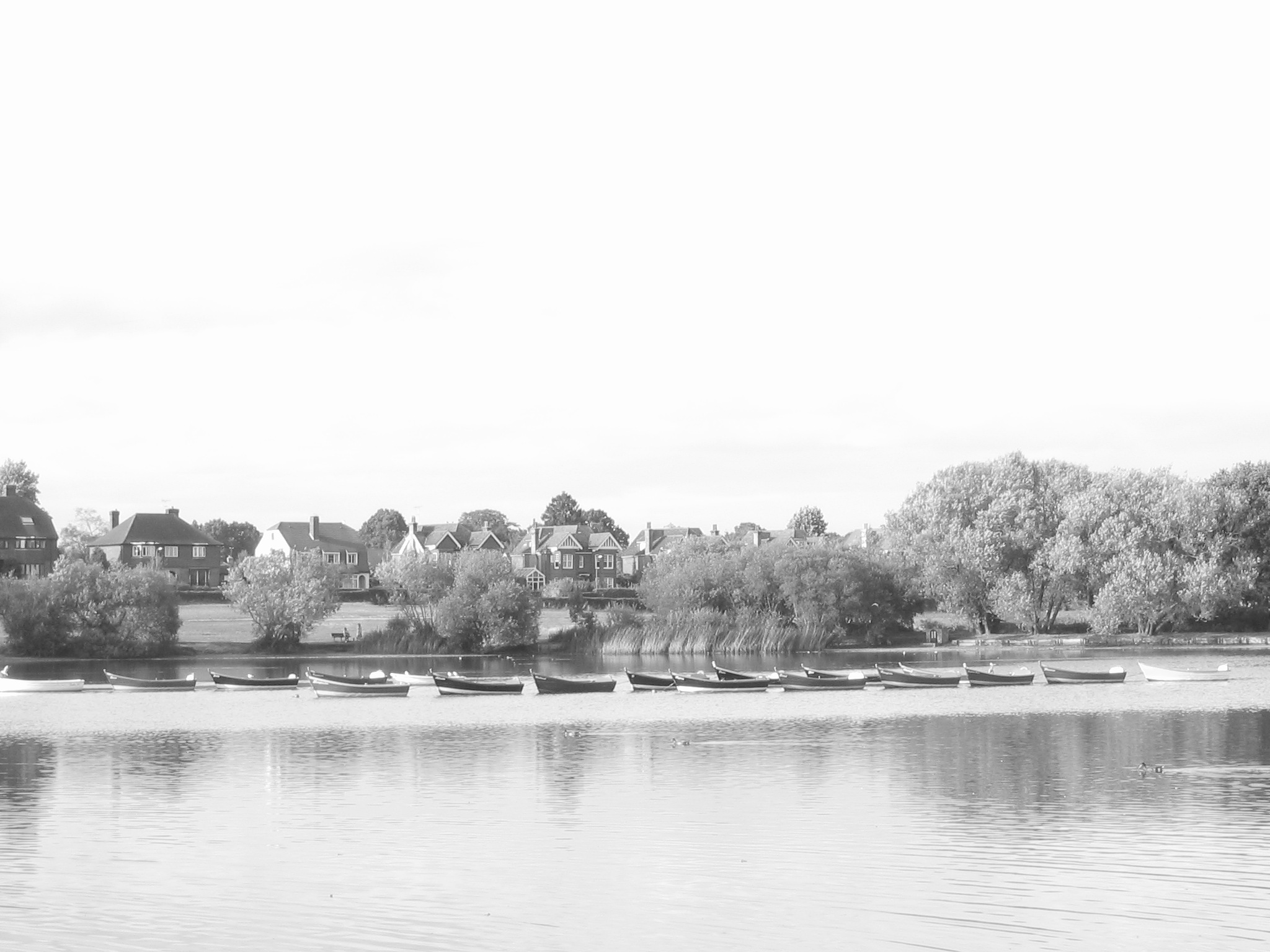
Heath Pond, autumn 2006

Close to the town and situated on the South Downs is Queen Elizabeth Country Park, which incorporates Butser Hill (270 metres), and has a variety of scenery including chalk hills, beech woodland and pine forest. The Hangers Way footpath starts from the country park, goes to Buriton, through Petersfield and in to Alton.

On the south east side of the town is Petersfield Heath, 91 acres (37 ha) of heathland including woodland, grassland, a 22 acres (8.9 ha) fishing and boating lake, and a picnic and recreation area. Petersfield Heath is a Site of Nature Conservation Interest (SNCI). It also contains 21 Bronze Age barrows which have resulted in the site being given Scheduled Ancient Monument status.

Heathland is very rare throughout Europe and Petersfield Heath is a typical heathland mosaic of micro habitats. Across the site are sandy heath and acid heath areas, grassland and scrub which gives the area diverse zones for insects, reptiles, birds and small mammals.

Petersfield Heath is at one end of "The Serpent Trail", a 65-mile (105 km) walk through heath and downland of Hampshire and West Sussex to Haslemere.

Petersfield Cemetery, situated in Ramshill, was opened in 1857.

== Governance ==
At a national level, Petersfield is part of the Westminster parliamentary constituency of East Hampshire.

At a county level, Petersfield is part of Hampshire County Council.

At a district level, Petersfield is part of East Hampshire District Council (EHDC). Before the creation of the EHDC in 1983, the town had been represented through the Petersfield constituency.

At a town level, Petersfield is represented through the Petersfield Town Council.

The Town Mayor of Petersfield currently exists as a ceremonial role and the mayoral term length is currently one year.

== Demographics ==
At the 2021 census, the civil parish had a population of 14,820 people in 6,638 households. The Office for National Statistics also defines a contiguous built-up area for Petersfield, which excludes outlying parts of Petersfield parish, but includes part of the neighbouring parish of Sheet; this had a population of 14,995 in 2021.

Census population of Petersfield parish
Census	Population	Female	Male	Households	Source
2001	13,303	6,922	6,381	5,846	
2011	14,974	7,850	7,124	6,525	
2021	14,820	7,779	7,041	6,638	

== Economy ==
There is employment in shops and offices in the town centre, and farms in nearby villages, while other people commute to London and Portsmouth. Light industry tends to be concentrated on the Bedford Road estate on the west side of Petersfield, including Whitman Laboratories (part of Estée Lauder). In 2007 the Norwegian-owned oil-supply giant Aibel Ltd added an engineering office in addition to their UK head office in Petersfield.

Rubber products were manufactured in the town from 1919 to the 1980s, making parts for footwear, and in the 1930s sets of interlocking bricks as construction toys, marketed as Minibrix, pre-dating the plastic versions created by Lego.

== Attractions ==
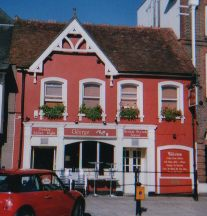
The George café in The Square in the middle of Petersfield

=== Fairs and festivals ===
On the nearest week-end to 6 October every year the Taro Fair is held on Petersfield Heath, a reminder of cattle fairs that were held annually until the 1950s. It is now a fun fair. ("Tarw" is the Welsh shout by the herders for "Bull"; pronounced "Taro" in English).

Free festivals are held throughout the year. The Petersfield Spring Festival over the May Bank Holiday weekend, the Petersfield Summer Festival over the August Bank Holiday weekend and the Petersfield Christmas Festival Market on the first Sunday in December. These are organised by a Community Interest Company called "Petersfield Community Events, based in the town.

The town also plays host to an annual "Scooter Sunday" festival, a mod-themed event which sees several hundred scooter riders gather in the square and live music. The event is organised by The Five Fifteen, a local menswear retailer.

=== Markets ===
Petersfield's market square holds markets every Wednesday and Saturday, there are also monthly Farmers' markets. Stallholders and farmers from Petersfield's French twin town Barentin visit Petersfield and hold a French market.

=== Gardens ===
In the High Street is the physic garden, which is a recreation of a 17th-century herb garden. It is open to the public nearly every day of the year. Next to the Red Lion public house is the small Charles Dickens garden.

Petersfield has a small volunteer-run community garden, 'The Good Life (Petersfield) Community Garden', situated on the edge of the town next to Sheet railway crossing; the garden is open to members (membership is free).

== Arts and institutions ==
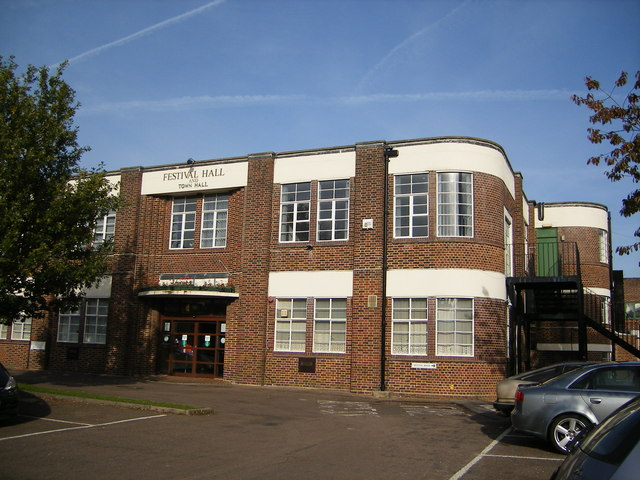
Petersfield Festival Hall and Town Hall

Petersfield has an Arts and Crafts Society which was formed in 1934. One of the founder members was the artist Flora Twort. PACS holds regular demonstrations and workshops and also holds a yearly exhibition in the Petersfield Festival Hall.

=== Theatre ===
Petersfield Festival Hall shows plays and concerts during the year.

Petersfield Youth Theatre was formed in 1990 and performs annually at the Festival Hall, as well as delivering projects throughout the year. The artistic director is Nik Ashton, the associate director of Matilda the Musical.

Winton Players was formed in 1947 and is one of the longest running Amateur Dramatics Societies in Petersfield. They are perhaps best known for their yearly pantomime which takes places at the Festival Hall.

The Petersfield Shakespeare Festival takes place every July in the grounds of Bedales School in Steep. Its productions are professionally staged and are augmented with performers from the local community. The artistic director is theatre director Jake Smith.

=== Music ===
The Petersfield Musical Festival began in 1901, founded by two sisters, Edith and Rosalind Craig Sellar. It is still held annually in the town's Festival Hall. Musicians associated with it over the years have included Kathleen Merritt (conductor of the Petersfield Orchestra from the 1920s to the 1970s), Dr Hugh Allen, Maurice Blower, Adrian Boult, Wilfred Brown, George Dyson, Sydney Watson, Steuart Wilson and (more recently) Mark Deller and Paul Spicer. Several pubs in the town host live music, open mic nights, and Battle of the Bands competitions. The Studio at The Petersfield School also hosts various live performances.

=== Museums ===
Petersfield has one museum, run by the Petersfield Museum Trust. It is situated in the town's old courthouse and police station. Within it are the Flora Twort Gallery, the Bedales Historic costume collection, which consists of over 1,000 pieces dating from 1720, and the Edward Thomas collection. The museum also exhibits social-history collections made up from maps, photographs, archives, oral history and artefacts related to the history of the town. Exhibitions are sometimes also held at the Festival Hall, St Peter's Church, and the Physic Garden.

Petersfield was once home to the world's first Teddy Bear Museum, which opened in 1984. It closed at the end of 2006, and is now a private house.

=== Youth club ===
The King's Arms is a youth club situated near the town centre, started by Petersfield Area Churches Together (PACT), a charitable Christian organisation. The Kings Arms now runs independently.

=== Cinema ===
Petersfield had a 700-seat cinema, the Savoy, that opened in the late 1930s. It was built on the site of the Petersfield Electric Theatre, which had been built in 1910. During the 1970s its use converted to a Bingo Hall before closure in January 1985. After six years of closure, the building saw use as a nightclub from 1993 for some years, first under the name "Oscars", then from 1999 as "Vertigo". It closed in May 2007 and was demolished in May 2008. The site is now occupied by residential flats and a retail store.

== Religion ==
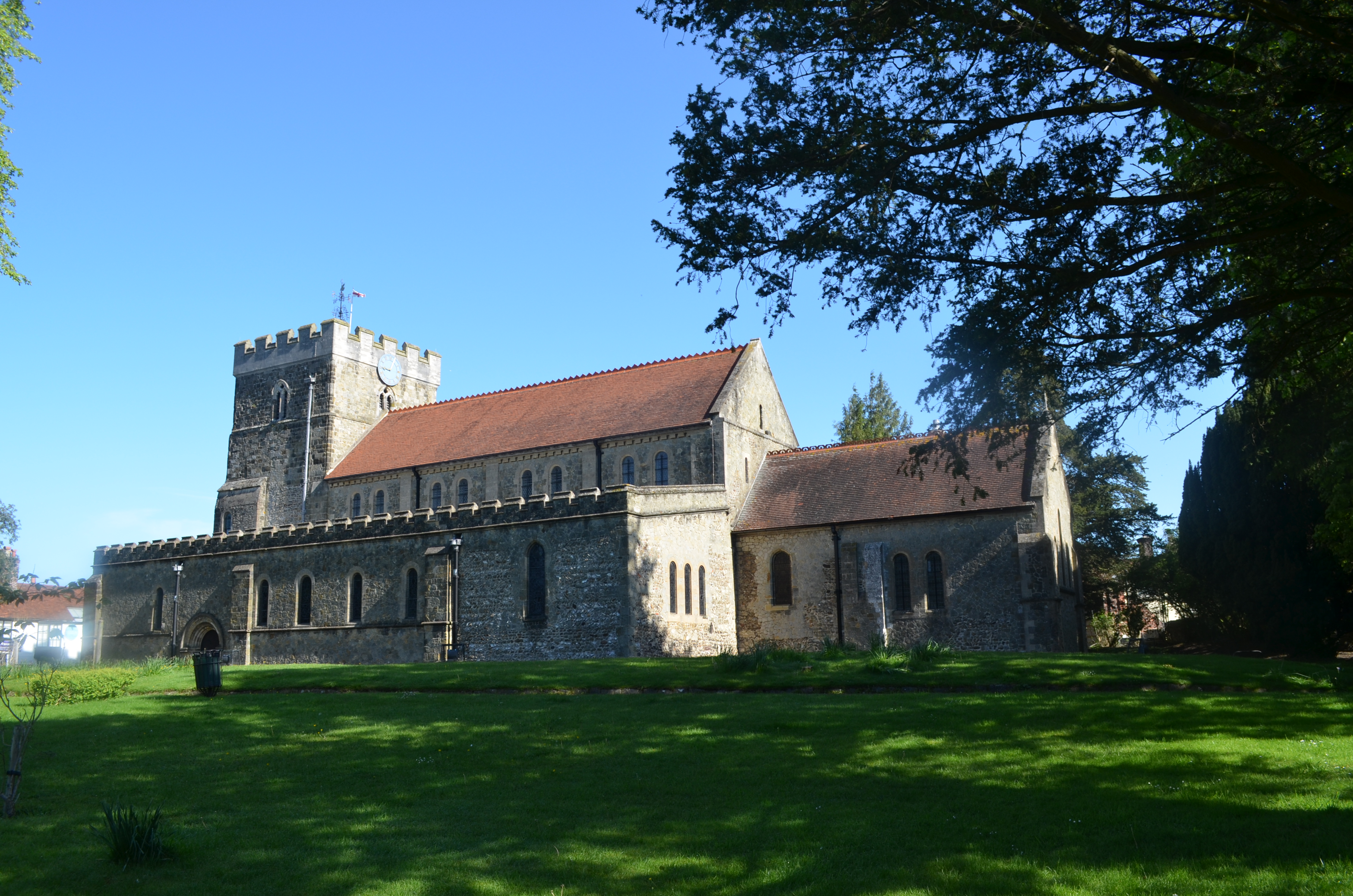
St Peter's Church

The parish church of St Peter, after which the town is named, is the Anglican church of Norman origins in the town centre, The Square. Other churches include Methodist (Station Road), Catholic (St Laurence's, Station Road) and United Reformed Church (College Street).

The Salvation Army has been in Petersfield since 1886 and has been situated in Swan Street since 1924. The hall is open most days with various community activities, serving the community in the traditional ways of the Salvation Army.

The Evangelical fellowship meets at the Herne Farm Leisure Centre on the eponymous estate, the Religious Society of Friends in the Voluntary Centre, High Street.

Life Church Petersfield, formerly Petersfield Christian Fellowship, has an office in Chapel Street and meets in the Methodist Church Hall located in Station Road.

== Sport ==
Sports venues include the Taro Centre, a leisure centre containing 3 swimming pools, squash courts, gymnasium, a sauna, steam room and other facilities. The town has tennis courts (both public and members only), an open-air pool, a number of playing fields and a golf club.

Petersfield has clubs and teams for sports. Petersfield Town F.C. plays in the Wessex League Premier Division. Several players have gone on to professional sporting careers, such as footballer Maik Taylor, rugby player Tim Rodber and more recently Calum Chambers who plays for Aston Villa and has been called up for England as well. The town has a Triathlon Club.

Petersfield has cycling groups including a local CTC group and The Petersfield Mountain Bikers.

== Transport ==
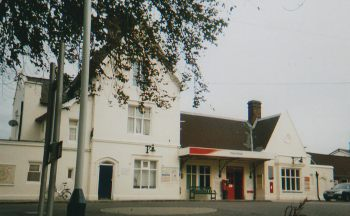
Petersfield railway station connects directly to London and Portsmouth.

Petersfield railway station is on the Portsmouth Direct line between London and Portsmouth. A branch line to Midhurst closed in 1955. The main station buildings date from the opening of the line in 1859 and are of a "town" type.

Petersfield stood at a major crossroads until the A3 London to Portsmouth road was bypassed to the west of the town. The A272 bypasses the town via the A3 and a link road to Sheet on its route between Winchester, Hampshire's county town, and Heathfield, East Sussex.

== Education ==
The local state secondary school is The Petersfield School, usually referred to as 'TPS'. Primary schools are Petersfield Infant School, Sheet Primary School and Herne Junior School. A number of other primary schools feed into the Petersfield secondary schools.

Petersfield lacks a state-sector sixth-form. Pupils normally continue their education at Havant and South Downs College, Bohunt Sixth Form or Alton College.

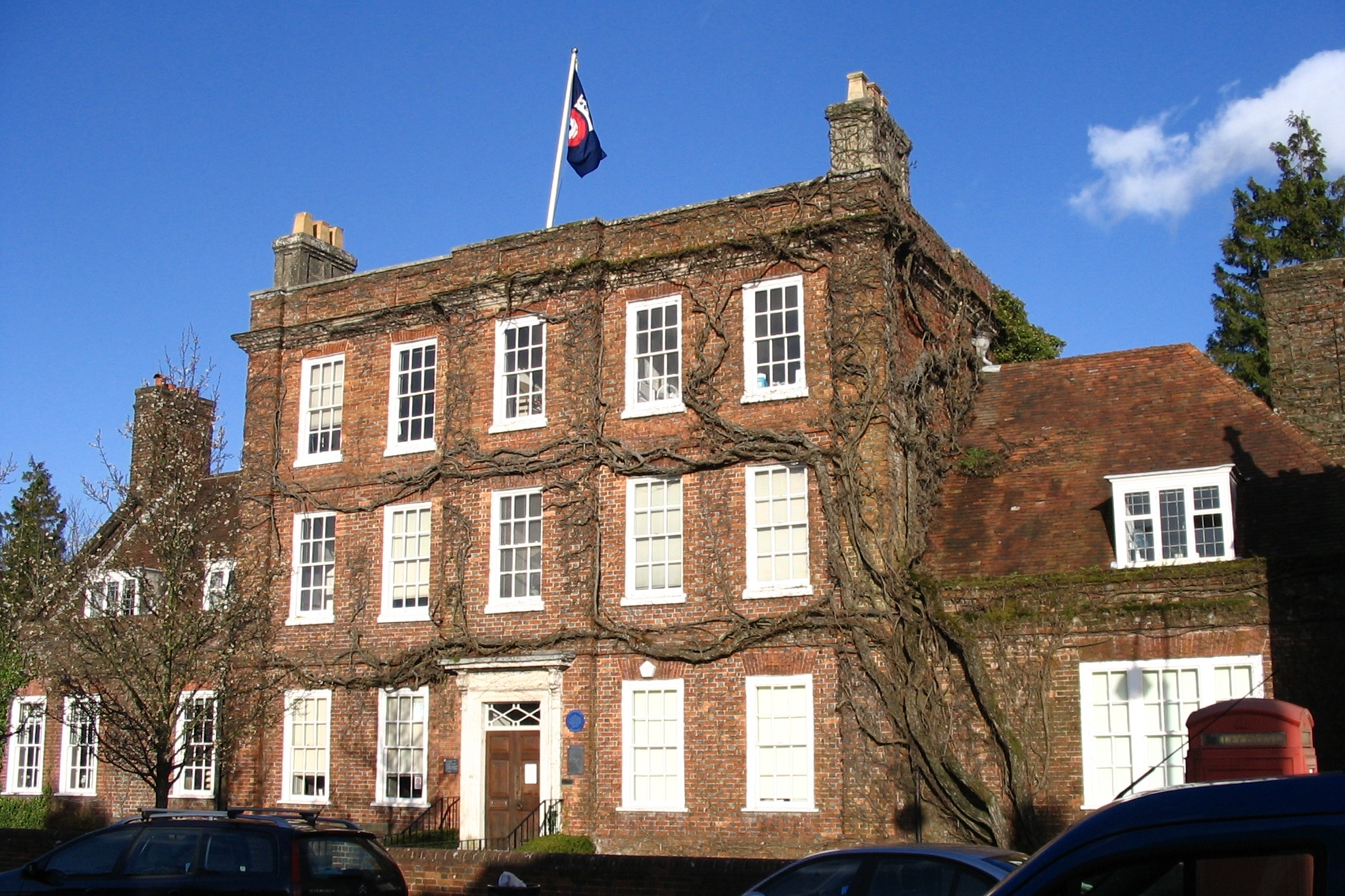
Original Churcher's College building in College Street; now council offices

The town and the surrounding villages are home to several independent schools. Churcher's College is in Petersfield, and counts Tim Rodber and Tiny Rowland amongst its former pupils. Ditcham Park School is just outside the town, and Bedales School is in the neighbouring village of Steep. The former Moreton House School in the town centre was bought by Churcher's College in 1993 to become Churcher's College Junior School, but it soon outgrew these premises and subsequently relocated to Liphook. The old Moreton House school site was converted to housing.

== Media ==
Regional local news and television programmes are BBC South and ITV Meridian. Television signals are received from the Midhurst TV transmitter.

Local radio stations are BBC Radio Solent and Heart South; Delta Radio was the local radio station for the area until 2010 when it merged with Kestrel FM from Basingstoke. It became The Breeze in December 2012. That station was closed in September 2020 and replaced by a national service, Greatest Hits Radio. A local volunteer group tested the potential for a non-profit community radio service in January 2019 and began making local speech podcasts that year. In August 2020 it started a 24-hour local radio service for Petersfield called Petersfield's Shine Radio. The service broadcasts online. ITV News Chief Correspondent Richard Gaisford is among the project's supporters.

Petersfield has three weekly newspapers, The Petersfield Messenger, Petersfield Post and Petersfield Herald. There is a monthly community magazine, Life in Petersfield.

== Notable people ==
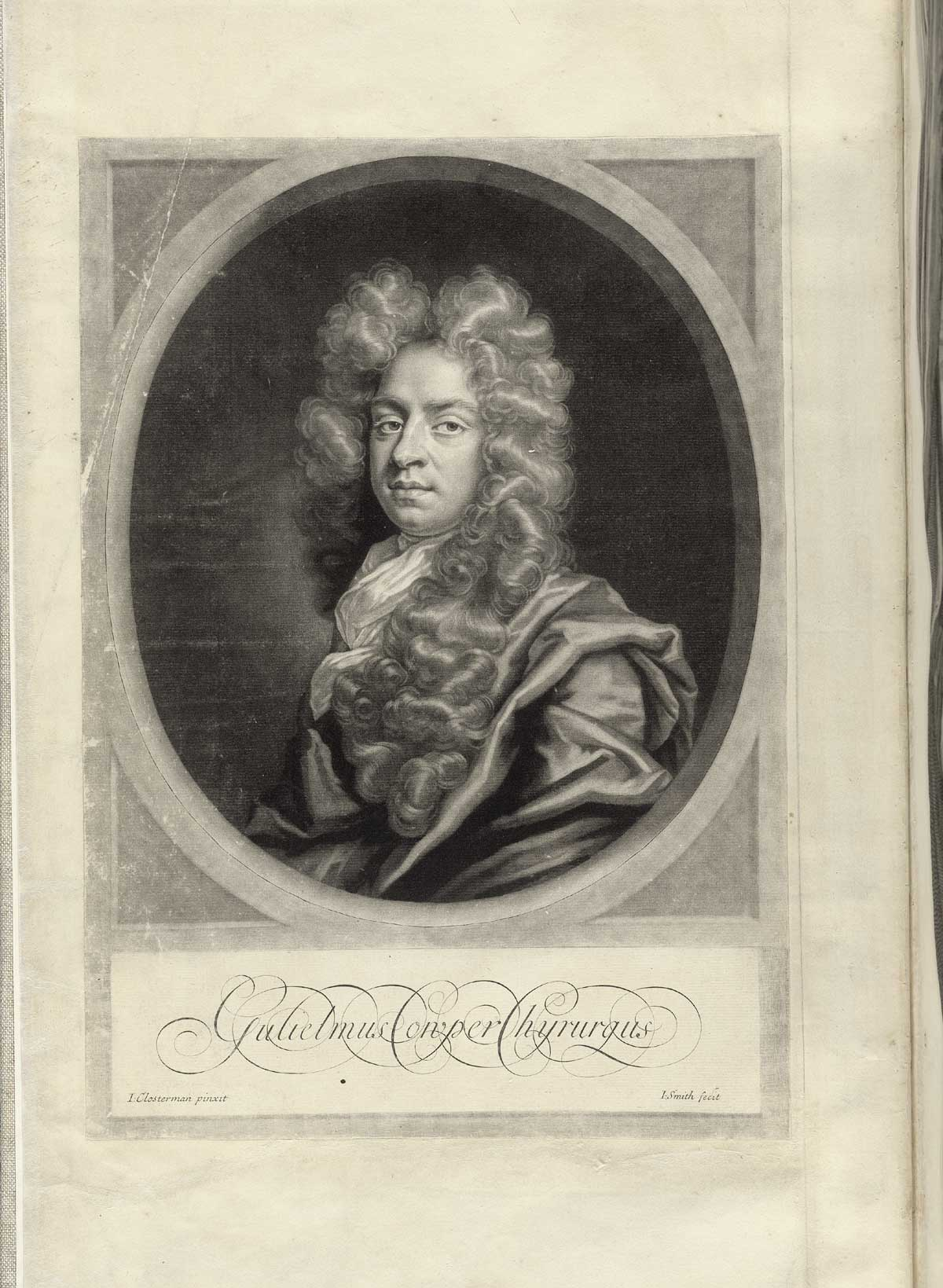
William Cowper

Anatomist and surgeon William Cowper (c. 1666 – 1709), who gave his name to Cowper's gland, was born in Petersfield. John Goodyer (botanist), Thomas Horder, 1st Baron Horder (Royal physician), Stuart Piggott (archaeologist), John Worlidge (agriculturalist) has links to the town.

Jamie Campbell Bower, Arthur Brough, Tamsin Egerton, Alex Lawther and Miranda Hart were all born, brought up or live in Petersfield, as are the BBC Radio 4's soap opera The Archers actors Charles Collingwood (Brian Aldridge) and Edward Kelsey (Joe Grundy). Sir Alec Guinness and his wife are buried at St Peter's Church in Petersfield and lived in Kettlebrook Cottage in Steep a village next to Petersfield.

In the music world, conductor Kathleen Merritt (who lived at Bridge House in the centre of town), opera director Ella Marchment, tenor Wilfred Brown, Sir William Henry Harris and composer Michael Hurd have connections to the town. Mark Owen of Take That lives in Petersfield.

Children's author Michelle Magorian lives in Petersfield. Author Ursula Moray Williams (1911–2006) was born there and John Wyndham (1903–1969), who wrote The Day of the Triffids, lived in the town. H. G. Wells also had links to the town, and The Old Drum public house bears a blue plaque commemorating his regular dining and writing there.

Vice Admiral Sir Stuart Bonham Carter (1972) and Sir Percy Wyn-Harris, mountaineer and Governor of The Gambia (1979) died in Petersfield. Victoria Cross holder Commander Loftus William Jones, killed at the Battle of Jutland, was born in Petersfield. From the citation:

Commander Jones was hit by a shell, which took off his leg above the knee, but he continued to give orders to his gun's crew, while a Chief Stoker improvised a tourniquet round his thigh. Noticing that the Ensign was not properly hoisted, he gave orders for another to be hoisted.

Arthur Chandler, Bishop of Bloemfontein, retired to Petersfield where he died in 1939. Christopher Lowson, Bishop of Lincoln, was vicar of Petersfield from 1991 to 1999.

In the sporting world, John Small, shopkeeper, cobbler, and Hambledon cricketer is buried in the churchyard of St Peter's. Footballer Calum Chambers was born in Petersfield in 1995. John Westwood, a notable football fan, lives in the town and is a partner in Petersfield Bookshop, which has two Royal Warrants and celebrated its centenary in 2018. Erika Roe, known for streaking at Twickenham in 1982, was working at the bookshop at the time.

== Twin towns ==
Petersfield is twinned with Barentin, France (since 1992),, and Warendorf, Germany (since 2006).

== See also ==
- Listed buildings in Petersfield
