= Petersfield School =

Coordinates: 50°59′59.89″N 0°56′25.07″W

The Petersfield School

Location
- Cranford Road; Petersfield, Hampshire; England

Information
- Type: Academy, secondary
- Motto: "Enjoy, Respect, Achieve"
- Established: 20 June 1958
- Specialist: Performing Arts College
- Department for Education URN: 136903 Tables
- Ofsted: Reports
- Head teacher: Mark Marande
- Gender: Coeducational
- Age: 11 to 17
- Enrolment: 1,390
- Website: http://www.petersfieldschool.com/

The Petersfield School (TPS) is a coeducational secondary school with academy status in Petersfield, Hampshire, England. Established on 20 June 1958, it is the town's only state-funded secondary school and serves Petersfield and the surrounding villages. The school was awarded specialist Arts College status in September 2004 before converting to academy status in July 2011. It is also recognised for its extracurricular provision, particularly in outdoor education, the Duke of Edinburgh's Award, and the Combined Cadet Force.

== History ==
The school first opened on 20 June 1958 with an original enrolment of 400 pupils. This has since increased to an enrolment of 1,200 pupils in 2010. It received Arts College status in September 2004 with the opening of a new studio called The Studio @ TPS.

In 2007, the school planned to create an all-weather AstroTurf pitch for association football and rugby, as well as two tennis courts, four hard courts, three cricket pitches, two cricket nets, and new changing rooms. The plan formed part of a sale of school land to Tesco, to allow expansion of its store next to TPS. Tesco planned to increase the store's floor space by 1,550 square metres and create a new loading area for lorries as part of its online shopping service. One joint application for planning permission was made for both the sports pitch and the store expansion. This decision was described as "manipulation and blackmail" by Kenneth Hick, a member of the Petersfield Town Council. East Hampshire District Council defended the joint application by arguing that: "The two parts of the application are inextricably linked. Without the sale of part of its playing fields, the school would be unable to progress the sports facility improvements, and without the land, the extension to the Tesco store cannot be brought forward."

Planning permission for the new development was granted on 5 June 2008. Permission was also later given to remove an ancient oak tree as part of the development, and consent was made by the Secretary of State for Education and Skills for the sale of school land to Tesco. The AstroTurf pitch was completed in March 2010, with the expectation that all the new facilities were to be complete and open for use by September 2010.

The passing of the Academies Act 2010 by the United Kingdom coalition government has allowed schools graded as "outstanding" by Ofsted, including The Petersfield School, to apply for academy status. In November 2010 the governors of the school voted unanimously for the school to apply to the Department for Education to become an academy. Academy status would allow the school to become independent from the local education authority (Hampshire County Council), and would as a result get an extra £500,000 of direct funding per year. The school announced that it aimed to have become an academy by the summer term of 2011. In May 2011 it was announced that permission had been granted for The Petersfield School to become an academy from 1 July 2011.

In January 2011, the school was reported to have suspended a pupil two days after he joined as it was suspected that he was an adult. A statement from Nigel Poole, the head teacher, stated that the suspension had been carried out due to the school's "child safeguarding policies", and that the pupil would be allowed to return if it could be "reassured" that he is fourteen years old, as claimed. The pupil was later allowed to continue attending classes when his age was proven through a birth certificate, and Nigel Poole apologised for the incident.

=== Rock Challenge ===
The Petersfield School was named the Rock Challenge UK south overall winner for 2008 with a performance illustrating the American Amber alert system. This has given it "premier school" status which resulted in the school competing in the Rock Challenge Premier League in 2009. In 2011 the school was again named the Rock Challenge UK south overall winner with a performance based on The Boy in the Striped Pyjamas novel.

== Inspections by Ofsted ==
The school was inspected by Ofsted in September 2002, and has been inspected three more times since then. In 2002, Ofsted praised the school's results in General Certificate of Secondary Education (GCSE) qualifications, which were above the national average, as well as the school's development plan to improve. Concerns were however raised about the gap in performance between male and female students in GCSEs, inconsistency in dealing with "the unsatisfactory behaviour of a small but influential minority of pupils", and the school timetabling system which resulted in many pupils having more than one teacher per subject.

In March 2007 the school was inspected with Ofsted rating the school's overall effectiveness as grade 3 ("satisfactory"). The relationship between pupils and teachers was described as "outstanding" and it was stated that the school had "good capacity to improve further". Criticism was given about the lack of "progress" from pupils in Years Ten and Eleven.

In June 2010 The Petersfield School was assessed as grade 1 ("outstanding"). Ofsted concluded that the school had improved significantly due to the introduction of a "departmental review system", including "pupil panels".

There were further inspections in 2014, with a judgement of Good, and 2018, with a judgement of Outstanding. As of 2023 this is the school's most recent inspection.

== Curriculum ==
Pupils choose their "learning pathways" for Key Stage 4 during Year 8. As part of the "core curriculum" all pupils must complete a General Certificate of Secondary Education (GCSE) course in English, English literature, Mathematics, and Science, plus enrol on a National Certificate course in information communication technology (ICT) or religious studies (RS). A physical education (PE) course must also be completed, though these may not contain an end qualification.

Beyond the "core curriculum" pupils can then choose four further options to study. These courses can contain a GCSE, National Vocational Qualification (NVQ), or a Business and Technology Education Council (BTEC) qualification. Some courses are run externally at Sparsholt College Hampshire, Oakmoor School, Bohunt School, Alton College, and Staunton Park School. Further optional "after school" courses are available at Havant College.

The Petersfield School's GCSE exam results have improved from 2007 to 2010. In 2007 the number of pupils gaining five or more GCSEs with the grades C to A* was 64%, which had risen to 85% by 2010. The number of pupils gaining five or more GCSEs with the grades C to A*, including English and mathematics, has risen from 54% in 2007 to 67% in 2010.

Since the school has been granted academy status, it has been permitted to deviate from the National Curriculum. Nigel Poole, the head teacher, had commented that "The National Curriculum is about to change and not necessarily for the better, in my opinion".

== Campus ==
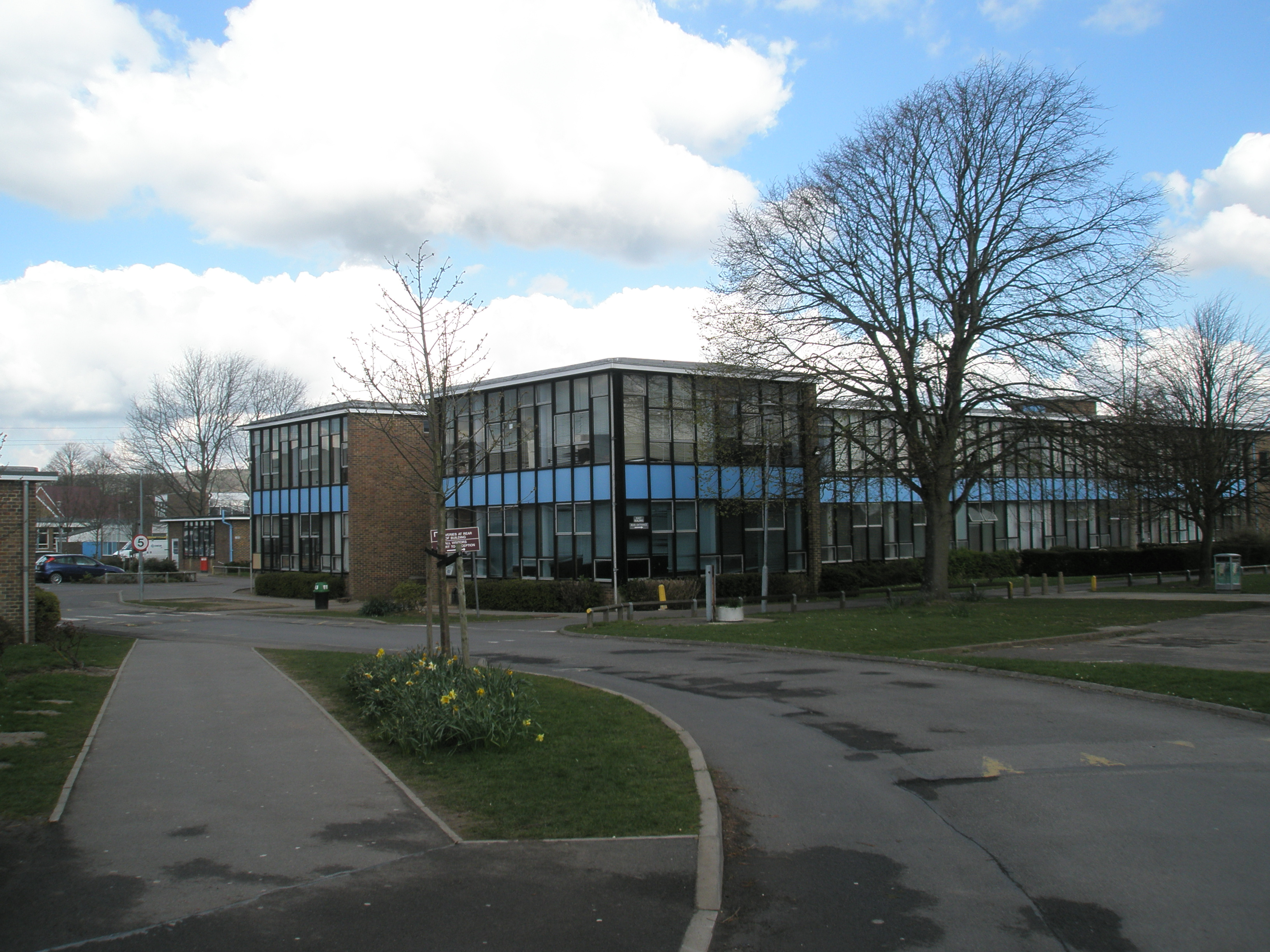
Main entrance into the school; part of the main block is shown.

The Petersfield School campus has buildings dedicated to different subjects or groups of subjects. Pupils have their tutor rooms around the school, and each year group has a Progress Leader who oversees their students' behaviour and attainment.

== Demographics ==
Pupils at the school are mostly of a White British background, with a minority from other ethnic groups. The percentages of pupils in the school who are eligible for free school meals, or have special education needs, are below the national average.

== Houses ==
The school introduced a new house system from September 2008.

== Notable people ==
- Layla Andrews (born 1997), painter
