= St Peter's Church, Petersfield =

Church in Hampshire, England

Coordinates: 51.0034°N 0.9376°W

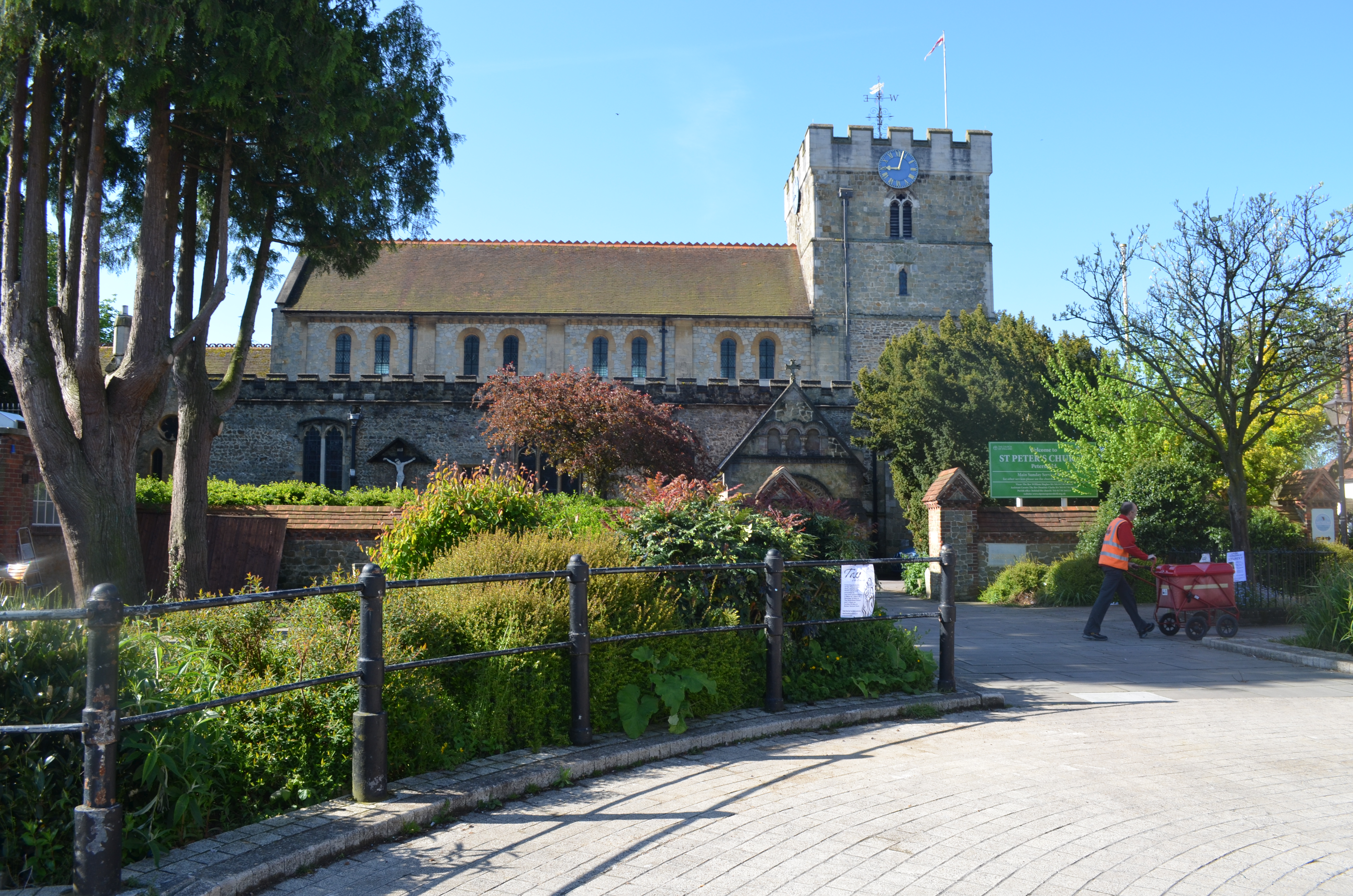
St Peter's from the north

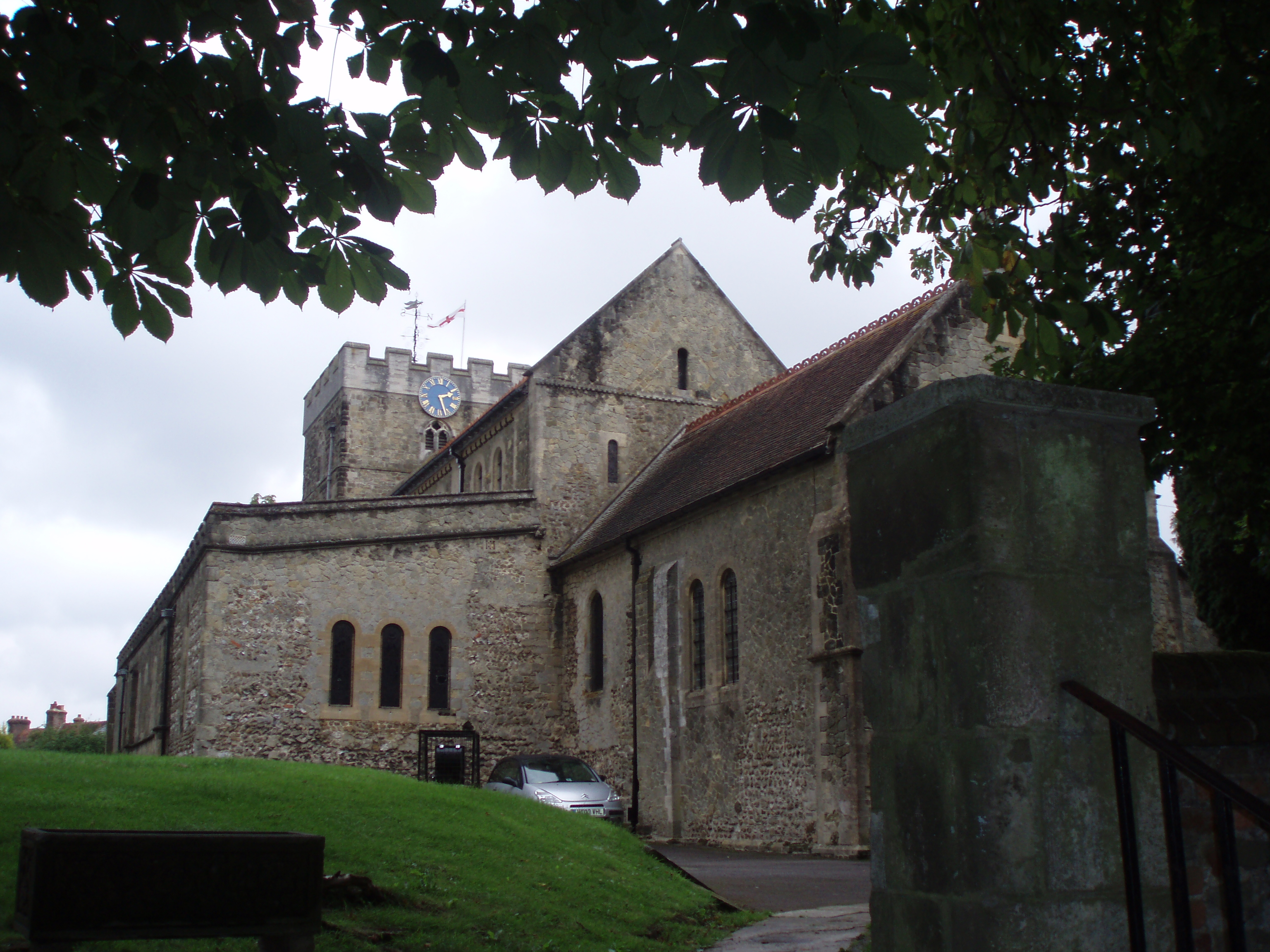
St Peter's from the south-east

St Peter's Church is the Anglican parish church in Petersfield, Hampshire, England. It is within the Diocese of Portsmouth. The ancient church, a Grade I listed building, is located in the centre of the town, on the south side of the Square. The architect Nikolaus Pevsner described it as "one of the most interesting churches in Hampshire",

== History ==
A chapel of ease was originally built, and called 'St. Peter's in-the-veld' (veld - meaning an open and clear place), within the manor of West Mapledurham (later Buriton). Although the town around the chapelry soon grew larger than that around the main church, St Peter's remained a chapelry to Buriton until 1886, when it became a separate parish. Since 1984 the two parishes have been held in plurality, so the Vicar of Petersfield is now also Rector of Buriton.

St Peter's was originally a Norman building; the north and south aisles were added at the end of the 12th century. The tower was raised to its present height during the 14th century and a parapet added. During the 15th century, several windows with perpendicular tracery were inserted

In 1873, a major restoration took place under the architect Sir Arthur Blomfield.

St Peter's was closed from October 1998 while the 'St Peter's 2000 Project' carried out an extensive restoration and re-ordering of the building. The church was re-dedicated by the Bishop of Portsmouth on 1 October 1999.

== The building ==
St Peter's began as a cruciform shape to which a tower was added soon after construction. The chancel arch has two orders, one ancient and one from the 1873 restoration. It has two transepts, the south of which was used as a chapel, there being a 13th-century piscina in the wall. Each transept has different pillar capitals. The local squires, the Jolliffes, had a gallery for their own use situated in the south-west corner of the church. There was a major fire in 1962 after which the timber above the south side aisle had to be replaced.

=== Measurements ===
The chancel is 9.75 metres by 4.27 metres, with modern vestry and organ chamber on the north, nave 18.59 metres by 5.03 metres, with north and south aisles, 4.87 metres and 5.18 metres wide respectively, north porch, and engaged west tower 5.02 metres by 5.18 metres.

=== Chancel ===
The chancel has at the east a modern triplet of windows in twelfth-century style, replacing a five-light fifteenth-century window. In the north wall is a late twelfth-century round-headed light, now blocked by the vestry roof, with inner jamb-shafts continued as a roll round the head of the window, unbroken except for a fillet on the springing-line of the arch. On the north the recess is pierced with a modern arch opening to the organ chamber.

=== Nave ===
The nave arcades are of four bays, the east arches on both sides being wider than the west. All are round-headed but only the two western arches of the south arcade are old. The columns are circular, as are the capitals of the north arcade, but those of the south are square, with recessed angles, being of somewhat earlier type than the others. They have small scallops and a deep vertical face above them, while in the north arcade the capitals have convex flutes. As already noted, the pillars of the north arcade have been altered and reset, but the two western pillars and the western respond of the south arcade are in their original positions, the capitals being at a higher level than those of the third pillar and eastern respond. The clerestory of the nave is an early 20th-century addition, with pairs of round-headed windows.

=== Tower ===
The west tower is of four stages, the top stage being of fifteenth-century date, embattled, with belfry windows of two cinquefoiled lights, and the lower three stages are of the twelfth century. At the southwest angle is a stair entered from without the church. The side walls on the ground stage are solid, but in the east wall is a wide semicircular arch of two square orders, dating from the first half of the 12th Century, with hollow-chamfered abaci like those of the chancel arch; and over it a plain roundheaded opening from the second stage of the tower, which must have given access to the roof of the early nave, as just above it is a gabled weathering. This latter is not quite central with the opening, its apex being to the south.

=== Bells ===
In the tower are eight bells, which are hung for traditional English style Change Ringing. The oldest bell dates back to 1750, and was cast by Robert Catlin of Holborn, London. The Tenor bell, which was cast in 1770 by the firm Pack & Chapman of the Whitechapel Bell Foundry, weighs approximately 790kg and is tuned to F. There is a well-established band of bell ringers at St Peter's, with over 30 members of all ages.

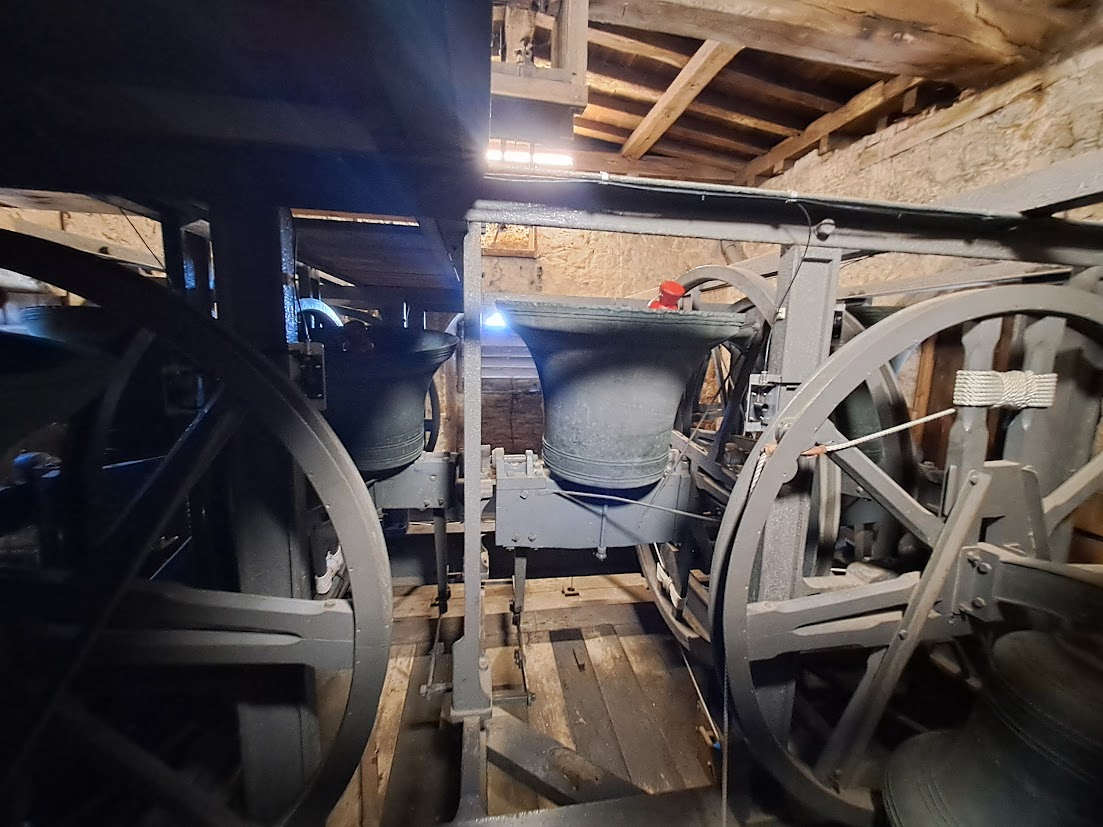
The bells in the belfry of St Peter's Church, Petersfield. The tenor bell in the centre.

Details of the Bells
| Bell | Weight | Note | Date | Founder |
|---|---|---|---|---|
| 1 | 222kg | F | 1978 | Whitechapel Bell Foundry, London |
| 2 | 237kg | E | 1978 | Whitechapel Bell Foundry, London |
| 3 | 268kg | D | 1895 | John Taylor & Co, Loughborough |
| 4 | 280kg | C | 1750 | Robert Catlin, Holborn |
| 5 | 313kg | B♭ | 1976 | Whitechapel Bell Foundry, London |
| 6 | 465kg | A | 1905 | John Taylor & Co, Loughborough |
| 7 | 600kg | G | 1895 | John Taylor & Co, Loughborough |
| 8 | 790kg | F | 1770 | Pack & Chapman, Whitechapel, London |

=== Internal features ===
==== Font ====
The font dates from the 15th century. It was replaced in 1873 and lay at the side of the churchyard for 70 years before being restored.

==== Organ ====
The organ was replaced in 1992 by Lammermuir Pipe Organs. There is a stained glass window to Bishop Samuel Wilberforce and another to Mary Sumner, founder of the Mothers' Union.

==== Altar ====
The altar was created by the noted craftsman Edward Barnsley.

==== Memorial ====
A brass tablet on the south wall honours Petersfield's only VC, Loftus Jones. in the west bay of the north aisle are two brass plates, one with an inscription to Anne Holt, 1655, the other to Dr. Thomas Aylwin, 1704, and his wife Mary, 1693. Many of the memorials have been removed from the nave and repositioned in the far south of the church, many in newly created utility rooms.

==== Plate ====
The plate comprises a silver communion cup and cover paten of 1568; a second cup and cover paten of 1612, given by Thomas Antrobus, senior, of Heath House; a flagon of 1707; a standing paten of 1721, given in 1830 by Thomas Chitty; an alms dish of 1757, given 1758, and a second dish of 1812, given 1813.

== Registers ==
The first book of the registers runs from 1558 to 1667, and contains entries of deaths from plague in 1563 and 1666; the second from 1669 to 1757, the marriages ending at 1754; the third has baptisms and burials, 1758–1807; the fourth marriages, 1754–84—this is a MS. book, and not the printed book ordered by the Marriage Act 1753; the fifth and sixth continue the marriage entries to 1804 and 1812; the seventh contains baptisms 1808–13, and the eighth burials for the same period. There are churchwardens' accounts in six books from 1751 to 1815, and poor-rate accounts from 1697.

== Churchyard ==
The churchyard lies chiefly on the south, having a gate at the east. The churchwardens' accounts mention the making of steps, a wall, and a gate on the east side of the churchyard opposite New Street (now St. Peter's Road) in 1754. This was so the local squire William Jolliffe, family could enter church less conspicuously.

== Vicars of Petersfield, 1845 onwards ==
=== 1845-1886: John Maunior Sumner ===
Sumner married Mary Le Couteur in Q4 1843 in Farnham, and she gave him four sons and four daughters -

- Q1 1846 Sumner Henry John Le Couteur
- Q1 1850 Sumner Eveline Mary
- Q2 1851 SUMNER Eveline Sophy Jane
- Q4 1856 Sumner Charles Mannoir
- Q1 1858 Sumner Emily Maude
- Q2 1859 SUMNER Mary Blanche, who died Q2 1872 aged 15.
- Q4 1860 SUMNER Robert Algernon
- Q3 1866 SUMNER George J C

Sumner died in Q2 1886. There is a memorial to him over the main entrance.

=== 1886-1909: Francis Jervoise Causton ===
Causton (1844- 1932) was educated at Bradfield College and University College, Oxford. After curacies in Abingdon and Crondall he was Vicar of All Saints, Alton for nine years. In 1909 he became Master of St Cross Hospital, a mediaeval alms house near Winchester. In 1918 his son was killed leading men of the Royal Hampshire Regiment in an attack at Pacaud Wood, Bethune.

=== 1909-1914: Archdall Malden Hill ===
Hill (1862-1936) was educated at Blundell's School and Sidney Sussex College, Cambridge. He served curacies in Leatherhead and Godalming, where he formed a lifelong friendship with Leonard Hedley Burrows, later the first Bishop of Sheffield. He held incumbencies at Warsash, Windlesham and Winchester before coming to Petersfield and at All Saints, Hove afterwards.

=== 1914-1921: William Henry Thomas ===
Thomas (1868-1950) trained at Sarum College. After two curacies in Dorset he was Vicar of Privett before his years at St Peter's (1914 to 1921) and Rector of West Meon afterwards.

=== 1930-1950: Elliot Charles Archer Kent ===
Kent (1891-1970) was educated at the London College of Divinity and served curacies in Hull and Wandsworth Common. Kent arrived at Petersfield in 1930 after a decade as Vicar of St Matthew, Gosport. He was appointed Rural Dean of Petersfield in 1936 and an Honorary Canon of Portsmouth Cathedral in 1945. He was also a governor of Churcher's College and Chairman of the Diocesan Bell Ringing Society. After leaving Petersfield he was at St Mary Ewshot until his retirement in 1958.

=== 1951-1959: Frederic Walter Hadfield ===
Hadfield (1908-1962) was ordained in 1937 after a period of study at Lincoln Theological College. After curacies in Manchester and South Shields he was a naval chaplain in the RNVR during World War II. He was the Rector of Botley from 1946 to 1951 and is buried there in the churchyard.

=== 1970-1990: Ronald Harry Granger ===
Granger (1922-2005) was educated at Selwyn College, Cambridge; started his ecclesiastical career at St Mary's, Portsea; and held two incumbencies in the Isle of Wight before his years at Petersfield.

=== 1999-2010 Giles Harris-Evans ===
Harris-Evans (b 1946) was Vicar from 1999 to 2010. His varied career took him to Bangalore, Clapham, Sri Lanka, Coventry and Brighouse before coming to Petersfield. In retirement he has continued to serve the church, among other things as a human rights observer in Palestine.

=== 2011- Will Hughes ===
Hughes (b 1976) was educated at Exeter University and Ripon College Cuddesdon. After a curacy in Warminster he was Vicar of Blackmoor with Whitehill.

== Bibliography ==
- An account of the History of Petersfield; Minty, E.A.; BOdley Head; 1923
- A history of Petersfield; Williams, Rev J.; G. Duplock; 1857
- Petersfield in Tudor Times, Yates, E.M.; Petersfield Area Historical Society; 1979
- Victoria County History, Hampshire Vol 5; 1912
- St Peter's, Petersfield, a short architectural history, Forshaw, D.; 1994
