= List of compositions for horn =

This is a selected list of musical compositions that feature a prominent part for the natural horn or the French horn, sorted by era and then by composer.

== Baroque ==
- Johann Sebastian Bach
  - Brandenburg Concerto No. 1 in F major, BWV 1046
- Johann Beer
  - Concerto à 4, for posthorn, hunting horn, two violins, and continuo, in B♭ major
  - Horn Concerto in B major
- Johann Friedrich Fasch
  - Concerto for 2 Horns FaWV L:D14
  - Concerto for 2 Horns in D Major FaWV L:D18
  - Concerto for 2 Horns FaWV L F2
- Christoph Förster
  - Concerto ex Dis [i.e., in E♭], No. 1, for horn, two violins, viola and basso continuo, Lund manuscript No. 5 (Saml. Wenster J:1–17)
  - Concerto ex Dis Dur [i.e., in E♭ major] No. 2, for horn, two violins, viola and basso continuo, Lund manuscript
- Carl Heinrich Graun
  - Concerto in D major for corno concertato, 2 violins, viola and basso
  - Trio ex D for horn, violin and Basso
  - Concerto in D major for horn, oboe d' amore and basso
  - Concerto in E major for horn, oboe d`amore and basso
- Christoph Graupner
  - Concerto for 2 Horns in G major, GWV 332
- Anton Joseph Hampel
  - Concerto in D for horn, 2 violins, viola and basso
- Georg Friedrich Händel
  - Concerto a due cori No. 2 in F major, HWV 333
  - Concerto a due cori No. 3 in F, HWV 334
  - Aria in F major HWV 410, for 2 horns, 2 oboes and bassoon
  - Water Music Suite No. 1 in F Major, HWV 384
- Johann David Heinichen
  - Concerto in F major, for 2 corni da caccia, 2 flutes, 2 violins, 2 violas, and basso continuo (Seibel 231, Haußwald I:15)
  - Concerto for 2 Horns, 2 Flutes, 2 Oboes, Strings & Continuo in F Major Seibel 233
- Georg Melchior Hoffmann
  - 2nd Concerto a 7 for horn, 2 violins, viola and basso continuo
- Johann Melchior Molter
  - Concerto in D
- Johann Georg Pisendel
  - Concerto in D for 2 Horns, 2 Oboes, Bassoon, Strings and continuo.
- Johann Joachim Quantz
  - Concerto for Horn, Strings, and Basso Continuo in E♭ major, QV 5: Anh. 13
  - Concerto for Horn, Strings, and Basso Continuo in E♭ major, QV 5: Anh. 14
  - Concerto ex D♯ major for corno concertato, oboe, 2 violins, viola and basso
  - III. Concerti a Corno concertato
- Johann Christian Reinhardt
  - Concerto ex Dis-Dur [i.e., E♭ major] for corno concertato, 2 violins, viola, and basso continuo (Lund University Library MS Wenster J:1–17)
- Friedrich Wilhelm Riedt
  - Concert a 5 for Horn, 2 Violins, Viola and Basso continuo
- Johann Georg Roellig
  - Concerto in E♭ major
  - Concerto in D major
  - Concerto ex D major for Corno concertato, 2 Violins, Viola and Basso
- Heinrich Schultz
  - Concerto ex D♯
- Georg Philipp Telemann
  - Concerto in E♭ major, for 2 horns, strings, and continuo, TWV 54:Es1, from Musique de table, troisième Production (Table Music, third Production)
  - Concerto for Horn, Strings, and Continuo in D major, TWV 12:D8
  - Horn Concerto in E♭
  - Concerto in D major for 2 horns strings and continuo, TWV 52:D2
  - Concerto in D major for 3 horns, violin, strings, and continuo, TWV 54:D2
  - Overture: Alster Echo in F, for 4 horns, 2 oboes, bassoon, strings, and continuo, TWV55:F11
  - Concerto a tre for Recorder, Horn and Continuo
  - Ouverture (Suite) in F Major for two horns
- Antonio Vivaldi
  - Concerto in F for Two Horns, Strings, and Continuo, RV 538
  - Concerto in F for Two Horns, Strings, and Continuo, RV 539

== Classical ==
- Johann Georg Albrechtsberger
  - Horn Concerto in F
  - Concerto a 5 for Horn, 2 Violins, Viola and Basso continuo
- Ludwig van Beethoven
  - Sonata in F major for Horn and Piano, Op. 17
  - Sextet in E♭, Op. 81b (for 2 horns, 2 violins, viola and cello)
- Frédéric Blasius
  - Symphonie concertante for 2 Horns and Orchestra
- Luigi Boccherini
  - Sextet Es-dur für Horn, zwei Violinen, Viola und zwei Violoncelli
  - Sextet Es-dur für Oboe, Violine, Viola, Horn, Fagott und Kontrabaß
- Robert Nicolas Charles Bochsa
  - L´écho. Deuxième Nocturne pour Cor et Harpe
- François-Adrien Boieldieu
  - Solo pour Cor avec accompagnement de Harpe
- Franz Danzi
  - Trio in F major Op.24 for Violin, Horn and Bassoon
  - Sonata in E♭, Op.28
  - Sonata in E minor, Op.44
  - Horn Concerto
- Louis-François Dauprat
  - 1st Concerto for Horn and Orchestra, Op. 1
  - 2nd Concerto for Horn and Orchestra, Op. 9
  - 3rd Concerto for Horn and Orchestra, Op. 18 ("Hommage d`Amitié et de Reconnaissance")
  - 4th Concerto for Horn and Orchestra, Op. 19 ("Hommage à la Mémoire de Punto")
  - 5th Concerto for Horn and Orchestra, Op. 21
  - Concertino for Horn
  - Sonate in F-major for horn and harp
  - Air Ecossais varié pour Cor et Harpe, Op.22
  - Horn Sonate, Op. 3
- Sébastien Demar
  - Grand Duo concertant for Horn and Harp, Op. 60
  - Concerto in D major for Horn and Orchestra
- Frédéric Nicolas Duvernoy
  - Concerto No. 1
  - Concerto No. 2
  - Concerto No. 3
  - Concerto No. 4
  - Concerto No. 5
  - 3 Trios for Clarinet, Horn and Bassoon, Op. 1
  - Fantasy for Horn and Piano
  - 1-3 Nocturne for Horn and Harp
- André-Frédéric Eler
  - Concerto No. 1 for Horn and Orchestra
- Friedrich Ernst Fesca
  - Potpourri for Horn and String Quartet, Op. 29
  - Andante and Rondo F major for Horn and Orchestra, Op. 39
- Josef Fiala
  - Concerto for two horns, strings, and continuo
  - Concerto in E♭
- Alexis de Garaudé
  - Fantaisie
- Michael Haydn
  - Concertino for Two Horns
  - Concertino for Horn
- Joseph Haydn
  - Horn Concerto in D, Hob. VIId:1 (1765) (lost)
  - Concerto for Two Horns in E♭, Hob. VIId:2 (ca. 1760) (lost)
  - Horn Concerto No. 1 in D, Hob. VIId:3 (1762)
  - Horn Concerto No. 2 in D, Hob. VIId:4 (doubtful; possibly by Michael Haydn) (1767)
  - Concerto for Two Horns in E♭, Hob. VIId:6 (doubtful; possibly by Antonio Rosetti; maybe Hob. VIId:2?) (1784)
  - Symphony No. 31 ("Horn Signal")
- Franz Anton Hoffmeister
  - Horn Concerto No. 1
  - Concerto No. 1 for Two Horns in E
  - Concerto No. 2 for Two Horns in E
  - Romance for Three Horns and Orchestra
  - Premier Concerto in D major for solo horn
- Louis-Emmanuel Jadin
  - 3 Fantasies for Piano and Horn
  - Symphonie concertante for Clarinet, Horn, Bassoon and Orchestra in F major
- Nikolaus von Krufft
  - Sonata for Horn and Piano in F
  - Variations for Horn and Piano
  - Sonata E major for Horn and Piano
- Joseph Küffner
  - Divertissement, Op. 227
- Martin Joseph Mengal
  - 2 Fantaisies for Horn and Piano
- Saverio Mercadante
  - Concerto for Horn
- Leopold Mozart
  - Concerto for Two Horns and String Orchestra in E♭ major
  - Sinfonia da caccia for Four Horns, Shot-gun, and Strings in G major, "Jagdsinfonie"
- Wolfgang Amadeus Mozart
  - Horn Concerto No. 1 in D, K. 412+514/386b (in two movements) (IMSLP listing)
  - Horn Concerto No. 2 in E♭, K. 417 (in three movements) (IMSLP listing, Mutopia listing)
  - Horn Concerto No. 3 in E♭, K. 447 (in three movements) (IMSLP listing, Mutopia listing)
  - Horn Concerto No. 4 in E♭, K. 495 (in three movements) (IMSLP listing)
  - Horn Quintet (horn, violin, 2 violas, cello) in E♭, K. 407 (in three movements) (WIMA listing)
  - Fragment for Horn and Orchestra in E♭, K. 370b+371
  - Fragment for Horn and Orchestra in E, K. 494a
  - Sinfonia Concertante in E♭ for Oboe, Clarinet, Horn, Bassoon and Orchestra, K. 297b/Anh. 14.05 (probably an arrangement of Mozart's original K. Anh. 9/297B for Flute, Oboe, Horn and Bassoon with spurious orchestral parts)
  - 12 Duets for Two Horns in C, K. 487
- Johann Baptist Georg Neruda
  - Concert for Horn and Strings
- Johann Martin Friedrich Nisle
  - Fantasy for Horn and Piano
- Giovanni Paisiello
  - Andante (écrit pour la fête de I´Impératrice)
- Franz Xaver Pokorny
  - Concerto No. 1 in D
  - Concerto No. 2 in D
  - Concerto No. 3 in D
  - Concerto in E major for horn, strings, and continuo
  - Concerto in E♭ major for two horns, strings, and continuo
  - Concerto in F major for two horns, strings, and continuo
- Giovanni Punto
  - 16 horn concerti (Nos. 9, 12, 13, 15 and 16 lost)
  - Concerto for two horns
  - 103 horn duos
  - 47 horn trios
  - 21 horn quartets
  - a horn sextet
- Anton Reicha
  - 24 Trios for three horns, Op. 82
  - Twelve Trios for two horns and bassoon or cello, Op. 93
  - Quintet for horn and string quartet in E major, Op. 106
- Joseph Reicha
  - Concerto for Two Horns, Op. 5
- Ferdinand Ries
  - Concerto for 2 Horns in E flat major WoO. 19
  - Sonata in F major Op.34
  - Introduction and Rondo for Horn and Piano, Op. 113, No. 2
- Johann Peter Ritter
  - Concertante E major for horn, violoncello and orchestra (Concertante for horn and violoncello)
- Antonio Rosetti
  - Two solo concertos in D minor, RWV 38-39
  - Eight solo concertos in E♭, RWV 40-43, 47-49, 54
  - Three solo concertos now lost, RWV 44-46
  - Three solo concertos in E, RWV 50-52
  - One solo concerto in F, RWV 53
  - Concerto for Two Horns in E♭ major, RWV 56
  - Concerto for Two Horns in E♭ major, RWV 57
  - Concerto for Two Horns in E major, RWV 58
  - Concerto for Two Horns in E major, RWV 59
  - Concerto for Two Horns in F major, RWV 60
  - Concerto for Two Horns in F major, RWV 61
- Johann Matthias Sperger
  - Concerto E♭ major for Horn and Orchestra (SWV B26)
  - Hornquartett in E♭
  - 12 Horn-Duos
  - Concerto in D
- Carl Stamitz
  - Concerto in E♭ for solo horn, 2 flutes, 2 horns, and strings
  - Trio for Horn, Violin and Cello in E♭
- Anton Teyber
  - Two Concertos for Corni da Caccia
- Othon Vandenbroek
  - 1st Symphonie concertante E♭ major for 2 horns solo and orchestra
- Johann Christoph Vogel
  - Concertante No. 1 in E major for 2 Horns and Orchestra
  - Concertante No. 2 in E major for 2 Horns and Orchestra
- Jacques Widerkehr
  - Symphonie concertante for Horn and Bassoon
  - Symphonie concertante for 2 Horns and Orchestra
- Paul Wineberger
  - Concerto in E♭ major for 2 horns and orchestra
- Friedrich Witt
  - Concerto in E for Horn and Orchestra
  - Concerto for 2 Horns in F major (No. 4)
  - Concerto for 2 Horns in F major (No. 5)

== Romantic ==
- Vincenzo Bellini
  - Horn Concerto in F
- Luigi Belloli
  - Concerto F minor for horn and orchestra
  - Concerto F major "Denominato Il trionfo dell' Innocenza" for horn and orchestra
  - Gran Concerto for horn and orchestra
- Hector Berlioz
  - Le jeune pâtre breton, Op. 13, No. 4 for tenor, horn and piano
- Johannes Brahms
  - Trio in E♭, Op. 40 for piano, violin, and horn (mutopia listing)
- Emmanuel Chabrier
  - Larghetto for Horn and Orchestra
- Luigi Cherubini
  - Horn Concerto
  - Sonata 1 and 2 for horn and strings
- Cesar Cui
  - Perpetual Motion
- Carl Czerny
  - Andante and Polacca in E major for horn and piano
  - Grande Serenade Concertante for clarinet, horn, cello, and piano
- Claude Debussy
  - Beau soir for horn and piano
- Felix Draeseke
  - Adagio in A minor, Op. 31 for horn and piano
  - Romance in F, Op. 32 for horn and piano
  - Quintet in B♭ major for piano, string trio and horn, Op. 48
- Johannes Frederik Frøhlich
  - Hunting Piece for four differently crooked horns
- Jacques-François Gallay
  - Horn Concerto No. 1
  - Horn Concerto No. 2
  - The Fantasy, Op. 34 for horn and piano
  - Quatuor, Op. 26 for 4 horns in different tones
- Alexander Glazunov
  - Reverie
- Charles Gounod
  - Six mélodies pour cor
- Joseph Holbrooke
  - Horn Trio in D major, Op. 28
- Heinrich Hübler
  - Concerto for four horns
- Gustav Jenner
  - Trio for clarinet, horn and piano
- Johann Wenzel Kalliwoda
  - Introduction and Rondo, Op. 51
- Friedrich Daniel Rudolf Kuhlau
  - Concertino in F, Op. 45 for two horns
- Ignaz Lachner
  - Concertino, Op. 43 for horn, bassoon and orchestra
- Maximilian Joseph Leidesdorf
  - Fantasie for horn and piano
- Richard Lewy
  - Horn Concertino
- Albert Lortzing
  - Konzertstück E-Dur
- Vincenc Mašek
  - Serenata in Dis
- Charles Oberthür
  - "Souvenir a Schwalbach", Op. 42 for horn and harp
  - "Mon sejour a Darmstadt", Op. 90 for horn (or two horns ad. lib.) and Harp
- Max Reger
  - Scherzino for Horn and Strings
- Carl Reinecke
  - Nocturne, Op. 112 for horn and strings
  - Trio in A minor, Op. 188 for horn, oboe and piano
  - Trio in B♭ major, Op. 274 for horn, clarinet and piano
- Carl Gottlieb Reißiger
  - Solo per il Corno
- Joseph Rheinberger
  - Sonate Es-major, Op. 178 for horn and piano
- Nikolai Rimsky-Korsakov
  - Notturno for horn quartet
- Gioacchino Rossini
  - Prelude, Theme and Variations for horn and piano
- Camille Saint-Saëns
  - Romance in F major, Op. 36 for horn and orchestra
  - Romance in E major, Op. 67 for horn and orchestra
  - Morceau de Concert in F minor, Op. 94 for horn and orchestra (Mutopia listing)
- Georg Abraham Schneider
  - Concerto for Four Horns in E♭ (1817)
  - Concerto No. 1 in E major for three horns and orchestra
  - Concerto No. 2 in E major for three horns and orchestra
- Franz Schubert
  - Auf dem Strom for tenor or soprano, horn and piano
- Robert Schumann
  - Adagio and Allegro in A♭, Op. 70 for horn and piano
  - Konzertstück (Concert Piece) in F, Op. 86 for four horns and orchestra
  - Jagdlieder, Op. 137 for four horns and male chorus in four voices
- Johann Gottfried Schuncke
  - Variations for two waldhorns and orchestra
  - Exercice
- Ludwig Schuncke
  - Duo Concertant for piano and horn
- Alexander Scriabin
  - Romance for horn and piano
- Leone Sinigaglia
  - Zwei Stücke
  - Romanza, Op. 3 for horn and string quartet
- Gaspare Spontini
  - Divertimento for horn and harp
- Franz Strauss
  - Fantasy on the Sehnsuchtswalzer of Schubert, Op. 2
  - Fantasy, Op. 6 for horn and orchestra
  - Nocturno, Op. 7 for horn and piano
  - Horn Concerto No. 1 in C minor, Op. 8
  - Romanze, Op. 12 for horn and piano ("Empfindungen am Meere")
  - Theme and Variations, Op. 13 for horn and piano
  - Les Adieux, for horn and piano
- Johann Strauss
  - Dolci pianti
- Carl Maria von Weber
  - Horn Concertino, Op. 45

== 20th century ==
- Jean Absil
  - Rhapsodie No. 6, Op. 120
- Hans Abrahamsen
  - 6 Pieces for Violin, Horn and Piano
  - Mit Grønne Underlag
  - Landscapes for Horn, Oboe, Flute, Clarinet and Bassoon
- Alexander Abramski
  - Concertino for Flute, Clarinet, Horn, Bassoon and Piano
- Stephen Albert
  - Ecce Puer for Soprano, Oboe, Horn and Piano
- Hugo Alfvén
  - Notturno Elegiaco, horn and organ, Op. 5
- Douglas Allanbrook
  - The Majesty of the Horn
- David Amram
  - Horn Concerto
  - Blues and Variations for Monk
- Malcolm Arnold
  - Concerto No. 1 for Horn and Orchestra, Op. 11
  - Concerto No. 2 for Horn and Strings, Op. 58
  - Fantasy for Horn, Op. 88
  - Burlesque (1944)
- Vyacheslav Artyomov
  - Fruhlings-Specht
- Alexander Arutunian
  - Horn Concerto
- Kurt Atterberg
  - Sonata in B minor, Op. 27
  - Horn Concerto in A major, Op. 28
- Simon Bainbridge
  - Landscape and Memory
- Don Banks
  - Horn Concerto
  - Trio for horn, violin, and piano
- Krešimir Baranović
  - Concerto for Horn and Symphonic Orchestra
- Carol E. Barnett
  - Concerto for Horn and Orchestra
  - Sonata for Horn and Piano
- Elsa Barraine
  - Crepuscules
  - Fanfare
- James A. Beckel, Jr.
  - The Glass Bead Game, Concerto for Horn and Orchestra (also available for band)
- Richard Rodney Bennett
  - Actaeon. Concerto for Horn and Orchestra
  - Romances for Horn and Piano
  - Sonate for Horn and Piano
- Niels Viggo Bentzon
  - Horn concerto
  - Sonate for Horn and Piano
  - Kopenhagener Konzert No. 1 for Flute, Horn, Trumpet, Cembalo and Strings
  - Trio for Horn, Trumpet and Trombone
- Leonard Bernstein
  - Elegy for Mippy I
- Lennox Berkeley
  - Trio for horn, violin, and piano, Op. 44
  - Sextet for Clarinet, Horn und String quartet
  - Quintett for Oboe, Clarinet, Bassoon, Horn and Piano
- Richard Bissill
  - Three Portraits for horn octet
  - Corpendium 1 for six horns
  - Sinfonia Concertante for clarinet, trumpet, horn and orchestra
- Bruno Bjelinski
  - Horn Concerto
  - Sonate for Horn
- Arthur Bliss
  - Rhapsodie für Mezzosopran, Tenor, Flöte, Horn und Streichquintett
- Hakon Børresen
  - Serenade for horn, strings and timpani – 3 movements (1943)
- Edith Borroff
  - Sonata for Horn and Piano
- Eugene Bozza
  - En foret
  - Sur les cimes
  - En Irlande
  - Suite for four horns in F (1951)
- Darijan Božič
  - Humoreska for Horn and Orchestra (1959)
- York Bowen
  - Sonata in E♭, Op. 101
  - Concerto for Horn, string orchestra & timpani, Op. 150.
- Brenton Broadstock
  - Nearer and Farther for Horn and Piano
- Benjamin Britten
  - Serenade for Tenor, Horn and Strings, Op. 31
  - Canticle III: Still falls the rain, Op. 55
- Margaret Brouwer
  - Sonata for Horn and Piano
- Geoffrey Burgon
  - Four Horns for four Horns
- Burkhard Dallwitz
  - Romanze
- Arthur Butterworth
  - Romanza
- Ann Callaway
  - Four Elements
- Carlos Chávez
  - Sonata for Four Horns
  - Energía for Nine Instruments
  - Concerto for Four Horns
- Andrea Clearfield
  - Songs of the Wolf
- Arnold Cooke
  - Rondo B-major for Horn and Piano
- Vladimir Cosma
  - Sonatine
- Edward Cowie
  - Endymion Nocturnes for Tenor, Horn and Strings
- Jean-Michel Damase
  - Berceuse, Op.19
  - Pavane Variée
- Peter Maxwell Davies
  - Horn Concerto
- Brett Dean
  - Three Pieces for Eight Horns
- Jean Michel Defaye
  - Alpha
- Norman Del Mar
  - Sonatina for two horns
- Norman Dello Joio
  - The Mystic Trumpeter for Horn and Choir
- Vladimir Djambazov
  - Dialog for Horn and Tape
  - LovenCoren for Solo Natural Horn (dedicated to Hermann Baumann)
- Paul Dukas
  - Villanelle for horn and piano (also for horn and orchestra) (Mutopia listing)
- Eric Ewazen
  - Sonata for Horn and Piano
  - Ballade, Pastorale and Dance for Flute, Horn and Piano
  - Grand Canon Octet
  - Trio for Bassoon, Horn and Piano
- Jean Françaix
  - Divertimento
  - Canon à l'octave
- Peter Racine Fricker
  - Horn Sonata
- Crawford Gates
  - Sonata for Horn and Piano, Op. 48
- Reinhold Glière
  - Horn Concerto in B♭, Op. 91
  - Intermezzo, Op. 35, No. 11
  - Nocturne, Op. 35, No. 10
  - Romance, Op. 35, No. 6
  - Valse Triste, Op. 35, No. 7
- Ruth Gipps
  - Horn Concerto op.58
- Iain Hamilton
  - "Voyages" for horn and chamber orchestra
  - Sonata Notturna for horn and piano
- Walter Hartley
  - "Sonoroties II" for horn and piano
  - Meditation
  - Fantasy on Vermont Tunes
- Bernhard Heiden
  - Sonata for horn and piano
- Lutz-Werner Hesse
  - Concerto for Horn and Orchestra
- Paul Hindemith
  - Horn Sonata (1939)
  - Horn Concerto
  - Sonata for Four Horns (1952)
- Emil Hlobil
  - Sonate, Op. 21
- Frigyes Hidas
  - Horn Concerto No. 1
  - Horn Concerto No. 2
  - Horn Concerto No. 3
- Heinz Holliger
  - Cynddaredd – Brenddwyd (Fury – Dream)
- Robin Holloway
  - Horn Concerto, Op. 43
  - Andante and Variations, transcription of Schumann's op.46 for horn, 2 'celli and 2 pianos
  - Serenata Notturna op.52 for four horns and chamber orchestra
  - Trio op. 113 for horn, cello and piano
- Alan Hovhaness
  - "Artik", Concerto for Horn and String Orchestra, Op. 78
- Yoshirō Irino
  - Globus I for Horn and Percussion (1971)
- Gordon Jacob
  - Concerto for Horn and Strings (1951)
- Leoš Janáček
  - Concertino
- Knud Jeppesen
  - Little Trio in D major
- Wojciech Kilar
  - Sonata for horn and piano
- Volker David Kirchner
  - Tre poemi
  - Lamento d'Orfeo
- Anđelko Klobučar
  - Canzone for Horn and Organ
  - Diptih for Horn and Strings
  - Diptih for Horn and Organ
  - Miniature
  - Sonate for Horn and Organ
  - Movement for Horn and String Quartet
  - Trio for Horn, Violine and Piano
- Oliver Knussen
  - Horn Concerto
- Charles Koechlin
  - Horn Sonata Op.70
- Jan Koetsier
  - Cinq Nouvelles for four horns, Op. 34a (1947)
  - Sonate for horn and harp
- Siegfried Köhler
  - Sonate, Op. 32
- Włodzimierz Kotoński
  - Quartettino, for 4 horns (1950)
- Uroš Krek
  - Concerto for Horn and strings
- Bernhard Krol
  - Horn Concerto "Study in Jazz"
  - Ballade, Op. 94
- William Kraft
  - Evening Voluntaries
  - Fanfare LA Festival '87 for Eight Trumpets, Four Horns, Four Trombones and Timpani
  - Veils and Variations for Horn and Orchestra
- Igor Kuljerić
  - Concerto for Horn and Strings
- Johan Kvandal
  - Introduction and Allegro, Op. 30
- Lars-Erik Larsson
  - Concertino for Horn and String Orchestra, Op. 45, No. 5
- Benjamin Lees
  - Concerto for French horn and Orchestra
- György Ligeti
  - Trio for Violin, Horn and Piano (1982)
  - Hamburg Concerto (1998)
- Magnus Lindberg
  - Campana in Aria for horn and orchestra (1998)
- Trygve Madsen
  - Sonata, Op. 24
- Josip Magdić
  - Concertino for Horn and instrumental ensemble
  - Hommage a Boris, for 2 Horns and Strings
  - Elegie for Horn and Piano, Op. 7
  - Concert gravure for Horn and Chamber ensemble (Koncertantne gravire za rog i komorni ansambl), Op. 50
- Kazunori Maruyama
  - Foxtrot for Tomcat
- David Maslanka
  - Sonata for Horn and Piano (1996, revised 1999)
- John McCabe
  - The Goddess Trilogy for Horn and Piano
    - The Castle of Arianrhod
    - Floraison
    - Shapeshifter
- Olivier Messiaen
  - Des canyons aux étoiles..., VI.Appel interstellaire
  - Le tombeau de Jean-Pierre Guézec
- Miroslav Miletić
  - Concerto for Horn and Strings
  - Three Scherzo for Horn and Violine
  - Monolog
- Stephen Montague
  - Horn Concerto
- Lodewijk Mortelmans
  - Lyrische Pastorale for Horn and Orchestra (or Piano)
- Thea Musgrave
  - Horn Concerto
  - Music, for horn and piano
- Hermann Neuling
  - Bagatelle for Low Horn und Piano
- Carl Nielsen
  - Canto Serioso
- Sparre Olsen
  - Aubade, Op. 57, No. 3
- Tadeusz Paciorkiewicz
  - Small suite for 4 Horns
- Boris Papandopulo
  - Elegy for horn and harp
- Frano Parać
  - Concerto for Horn and Orchestra
- Jiri Pauer
  - Horn Concerto (1957)
- Walter Perkins
  - Concerto for Four Horns
- Ivo Petrić
  - Horn Concerto
  - Gemini concertino for Violin, Horn and six instruments
  - Three compositions for Horn
  - Music for five for Horn and four percussions
  - Lyric Fragment for Mezzo-soprano, Horn and Piano
  - Sonata No. 1 for Horn and Piano
  - Lyrics for Horn and Piano
  - Sonata No. 2 for Horn and Piano
- Werner Pirchner
  - Born for Horn, for four horns, PWV 36
- Wolfgang Plagge
  - Sonata No. 1 for Horn and Piano, Op. 8
  - Sonata No. 2 for Horn and Piano
  - Sonata No. 3 for Horn and Piano
  - A Litany for the 21st Century
- Hans Wolfgang Poser
  - Sonate, Op. 8
- Almeida Prado
  - Trio from the Diary of Pero Vaz de Caminha
  - Celectial Charts III
- Francis Poulenc
  - Élégie for horn and piano, Op. 168 (1957)
- Dušan Radić
  - Concerto for oboe, horn and orchestra (1985)
  - Preludio, aria e rondo for oboe, horn and piano (1985)
- Guido Santórsola
  - Concerto for 4 horns and orchestra (1967)
- Peter Schickele
  - "Pentangle" Five Songs for Horn and Orchestra
- Othmar Schoeck
  - Horn Concerto
- Peter Seabourne
  - Double Concerto for horn and Orchestra (2012)
  - The Black Pegasus – Rhapsody for horn and piano (2018)
- Humphrey Searle
  - Aubade for Horn and Strings
- Mátyás Seiber
  - Nocturne for horn and strings
- Vissarion Shebalin
  - Concertino, Op. 14, No. 2
- Robert Simpson
  - Horn Trio
  - Horn Quartet
- Yngve Sköld
  - Horn Concerto, Op. 74
- Ethel Smyth
  - Concerto for Violin, Horn and Orchestra
- Rand Steiger
  - A New-Slain Knight
- Richard Strauss
  - Two Études in E♭ and E, for solo horn, TrV 15 (1873)
  - Introduction, Theme and Variations in E♭, for horn and piano, TrV 70 (1878)
  - Andante in C, for horn and piano, TrV 155 (1888)
  - Horn Concerto No. 1 in E♭, Op. 11 (1883)
  - Horn Concerto No. 2 in E♭, TrV 283 (1942)
- Igor Štuhec
  - Concert Fantasy for horn and strings
  - Four compositions for Horn and Piano
  - Tema con variazioni for Violin, Horn and Piano
- Stjepan Šulek
  - Concerto for Horn and Orchestra
- Randall Svane
  - Horn Concerto 1991
  - At The Round Earth's Imagined Corners 1993 (tenor, horn, timpani, strings)
- Josef Tal
  - Duo for oboe & English horn (1992)
- Alexander Tcherepnin
  - Six Pieces for Four Horns
- Michael Tippett
  - Sonata for 4 Horns
- Henri Tomasi
  - Chant Corse for Horn and Piano
  - Danse Profane for Horn and Piano
  - Horn Concerto
- Ernest Tomlinson
  - Rhapsody and Rondo for Horn and Orchestra
  - Romance and Rondo for Horn and Orchestra
- Kerry Turner
  - Sonata for Horn and Piano
  - Twas a Dark and Stormy Night (horn and piano)
  - Concerto for Low Horn and Chamber Orchestra
- Prosper Van Eechaute
  - Nachtpoema for Horn and Orchestra (or Piano)
- Jane Vignery
  - Sonate, Op. 7
- Heitor Villa-Lobos
  - Chôros No. 3, for clarinet, alto saxophone, bassoon, three horns, and trombone
  - Chôros No. 4, for three horns and trombone
- Gilbert Vinter
  - Hunter's moon
- Errollyn Wallen
  - At the Ending of a Year
- Julius Weismann
  - Horn Concertino
- Alec Wilder
  - Sonatas Nos. 1-3 for Horn and Piano
  - Suite for Horn and Piano
- Yehuda Yannay
  - Hidden Melody for French horn and cello

=== Unaccompanied ===
- Hans Erich Apostel
  - Sonatine, Op. 39 b (1964)
- Malcolm Arnold
  - Fantasy for Horn, Op. 88 (1966)
- Milton Babbitt
  - Around The Horn (Copyright 1994)
- Hermann Baumann
  - Elegia for solo natural horn
- Sigurd Berge
  - Hornlokk (Horn Call) (1972)
  - Horn 2000
- Richard Bissill
  - Lone Call and Charge, for solo
- Vitaly Buyanovsky
  - Pieces – Four Improvisations from Traveling Impressions
  - Finland Sonate
  - Baumann-Sonate
- Peter Maxwell Davies
  - Sea Eagle (1982)
- Stephen Dodgson
  - "Cor Leonis"
- Jörg Herchet
  - Einschwingen
- Douglas Hill
  - "Jazz Set" horn solo
  - Character Pieces for Solo Horn
  - Abstraction, for solo horn and 8 horns
  - Jazz Soliloquies for horn "Laid Back" Laid back
- Robin Holloway
  - Partita no.1 for solo horn op 61 no.1
  - Partita no.2 for solo horn op 61 no.2
- Ivo Josipović
  - Prelude and Fuge for Horn
- Viktor Kalabis
  - Invokation
- Bernhard Krol
  - Laudatio for Horn Solo (1965, premiere 1970)
- Henri Lazarof
  - Intrada for solo horn
- Robert Hall Lewis
  - Monophony VI
- Lior Navok
  - Six Pieces for Solo Horn (1995)
- Vincent Persichetti
  - Parable for Solo Horn (Copyright 1973)
- Wolfgang Plagge
  - Monoceros, Op. 51 (1990)
- Anthony Plog
  - Postcards II (1995)
- Esa-Pekka Salonen
  - Concert Etude (2000)
- Giacinto Scelsi
  - Quattro Pezzi (1987)
- Mark Schultz
  - Podunk Lake (1993)
  - Glowing Embers (1994)
- Karlheinz Stockhausen
  - In Freundschaft (1977, version for horn written 1983/1984 and premiered 1985)

== 21st century ==
- Hans Abrahamsen
  - Concerto for Horn and Orchestra
- Kalevi Aho
  - Horn Concerto
- Michael Conway Baker
  - Remeberances for Horn, Harp, Strings & Wordless Choir, Op. 130
- Brian Balmages
  - Pele for solo horn and wind ensemble
- Karol Beffa
  - Five o'clock, for flute, oboe, clarinet, bassoon and horn
  - Buenos Aires, for brass quintet
  - Le Pavillon d'or, for flute, oboe, clarinet, bassoon, trumpet, horn, trombone, harp, piano, 1 percussion, string quintet
- Jeffrey Bishop
  - Spells and Incantations
- Željko Brkanović
  - Bagatela for Horn in F and Piano
- Ole Buck
  - Kindergarten für Flöte, Oboe, Horn und Violine
  - Sonnabend für Flöte, Oboe, Horn und Violine
- Howard J. Buss
  - A Day in the City for solo horn
  - Alien Loop de Loopsfor horn and electronic recording
  - Aquarius for three horns
  - Ballad for horn and piano
  - Dreams from the Shadows for horn and vibraphone
  - Fables from Aesop for horn and violin
  - Fanfare for a Golden Era for 15 horns (written for the 50th Anniversary of the International Horn Symposium, 2018)
  - Four Miniatures for 2 horns
  - Imaginations for horn, trombone and piano
  - In Memoriam for horn and piano
  - Interstellar for horn, tuba, and electronic recording
  - Into the Hall of Valor for horn and band (written for the 50th Anniversary of the International Horn Symposium, 2018)
  - Into the Hall of Valor for horn and piano
  - Jazzical #4 for forn, trombone, tuba, and piano
  - Levi's Dream for 4 horns
  - Night Tide for horn and marimba
  - Passage to Eden for clarinet, horn and piano
  - Pathways for 4 horns
  - Prayer for 12 horns
  - Prelude and Intrada for 4 horns
  - Seasons of Change for solo horn
  - Time Capsule for 2 horns
  - Trio Lyrique for horn, bassoon and piano
- Elliott Carter
  - Horn concerto
- Pavle Dešpalj
  - Festival Parade for Horn and Symphonic Orchestra
- Anders Eliasson
  - Concert for Horn and Orchestra
  - Konzert: Farfalle E Ferro for Horn and String- orchestra
- Eric Ewazen
  - Concerto for Horn and String Orchestra
- Richard Faith
  - Movement No. 2 for Horn and Piano
- Jelena Firssowa
  - Kammerkonzert No. 4 for Horn and 13 Instruments
- Kenneth Fuchs
  - Canticle to the Sun (2005)
- David Gillingham
  - Concerto for Horn and Symphonic Band
- Friedrich Goldmann
  - Trio für Horn, Violine und Klavier
- Tomaž Habe
  - Concerto for Horn
- James Horner
  - Collage for four horns and orchestra
- Jouni Kaipainen
  - Concerto for Horn and Orchestra, Op. 61 (2000–01)
- Milko Kelemen
  - Horn and Strings
- Matthew King
  - King's Wood Symphony (21 horns with optional percussion and electronics)
  - King's Wood Trio (horn, violin and piano)
  - King's Wood Nonet (9 horns with electronics)
- Peter Lieberson
  - Horn Concerto
- Jorge E. López
  - Symphonie fleuve for horn and orchestra, Op. 20 (2005–07)
- Pamela J. Marshall
  - "wild horn whose voice the woodland fills" for eight horns
- Colin Matthews
  - Horn Concerto (2001)
- Lior Navok
  - Paper Tigers, [brass trio - trumpet, horn and trombone] (2024)
- Krzysztof Penderecki
  - Concerto per corno e orchestra "Winterreise"
- William Presser
  - Fantasy on the Mouldering Vine
  - Elegy and Caprice for Horn and Piano
  - Sonatina
  - Rhapsody on a Peaceful Theme
- Simon Proctor
  - Concerto for Horn
- Craig Russell
  - Rhapsody for Horn and Orchestra (Morning's Decisions, Dizzy Bird, Wistful Musing, Tito Machito, Flash)
- Osmo Tapio Räihälä
  - Concerto for French horn (2013)
- Aulis Sallinen
  - Horn Concerto, Op. 82 "Campane ed Arie" (2002)
- Mark Schultz
  - Lights! (2003)
- Thomas Sleeper
  - Concerto for Horn and Orchestra
- Karlheinz Stockhausen
  - Nebadon, for horn and 8-channel electronic music
- Ananda Sukarlan
  - Trio for Horn, Clarinet & Piano "Mutahariana" based on melodies by H. Mutahar
  - "Niobe weeping while Turning Into Stone" for horn & piano
- Jörg Widmann
  - Horn Concerto
- Herbert Willi
  - Äon (concerto for horn)
- John Williams
  - Concerto for Horn (Angelus, Battle of Trees, Pastorale, Hunt, Nocturne)
- Charles Wuorinen
  - Horn Trio
  - Horn Trio Continued
- Mauricio Annunziata
  - Canto de la Audaz Huida, Op. 115, Epic Poem for Soprano, Horn and Piano inspired in the historical episode Éxodo Jujeño
  - Concierto para Corno y Orquesta, Op. 116, Concerto for Horn and Orchestra
- Isidora Žebeljan
  - Dance of the Wooden Sticks, for horn and strings (or string quintet)
- Salvador Brotons
  - Ab Origine, Horn Concerto opus 114 (Ab Origine-Ciaccona/Cadenza-Giga)** Premiered by Javier Bonet in 2009 with the National Orchestra of Spain conducted by Josep Pons
- Juan José Colomer
  - Naturaleza Humana-Concerto for Horn, Horn Chorus and orchestra, premiered in 2004 by Javier Bonet. Recorded in the label VERSO

=== Unaccompanied ===
- Dennis Báthory-Kitsz
  - Ciglerania
  - Sweet Ovals
- István Bogár
  - Változo Felhök
  - Night Bird. A locrian short for Peter Reit 2012. L227
- Howard J. Buss
  - A Day in the City
  - On the Stroke of Midnight
  - Seasons of Change
- Carmen Fizzarotti
  - How long is now?
- Martin Butler
  - Hunding
- Andrés Valero Castells
  - Les Trois Roses du Cimetière de Zaro (A.V.18)
- Trygve Madsen
  - The Dream of The Rhinoceros, Op. 92
- Ricardo Matosinhos
  - Reflections, op.71 (2016)
  - Mirage, op.83 (2019)
  - Improviso, op.82 (2019)
  - Pastoral, op.81 (2019)
  - Overtone Dream, op.86 (2020)
  - Blues for Marco, op.85a
- Siegfried Matthus
  - Hoch willkommt das Horn
- Krzysztof Penderecki
  - Capriccio per Radovan "Il sogno di un cacciatore"
- Jörg Widmann
  - Air für Horn solo
- Yehuda Yannay
  - Hornology for solo French horn
- Salvador Brotons
  - Ab Origine, opus 114 bis for natural horn solo from the horn concerto. Premiered by Javier Bonet
- Shai Cohen
  - ER=EPR for French Horn and live electronics

== See also ==
- Horn trio
