= Horn Concerto =

Horn Concerto may refer to:

- Horn concerto
- Horn Concerto (Carter)
- Horn Concerto (Glière)
- Horn Concerto (Hindemith)
- Horn Concerto (Jacob)
- Horn Concerto (Ligeti)
- Horn Concerto (Widmann)
- Horn Concerto (Williams)
