= Op. 86 =

In music, Op. 86 stands for Opus number 86. Compositions that are assigned this number include:

- Beethoven – Mass in C major
- Dvořák – Mass in D major
- Prokofiev – Betrothal in a Monastery
- Schumann – Konzertstück for Four Horns and Orchestra
- Strauss – Divertimento for Chamber Orchestra after Keyboard Pieces by Couperin
