= Philip Fowke =

English pianist (born 1950)

Philip Fowke (born 28 June 1950) is an English pianist.

== Biography ==
Philip Francis Fowke studied at the Royal Academy of Music (RAM) with Gordon Green, a pupil of Egon Petri. In 1974 he made his London debut with a recital at the Wigmore Hall (Beethoven, Schumann, Bartók and Liszt). That year he won joint second place at the BBC Piano Competition (first place was not awarded). This led to broadcasts on BBC radio in a performance of Rachmaninoff's Rhapsody on a Theme of Paganini.

In 1977, he was 5th placed finalist in the inaugural Sydney International Piano Competition. He entered the International Tchaikovsky Competition in Moscow but was not a finalist. Fowke made his Proms debut in 1979 with a performance of John Ireland’s Piano Concerto in E-flat major, with the BBC Scottish Symphony Orchestra under Simon Rattle. His other appearances at the Proms include Constant Lambert's Piano Concerto and Richard Addinsell's Warsaw Concerto.

In 1979 also, he performed two-piano works with Eileen Joyce. He played Sir Arthur Bliss's Piano Concerto at his United States debut in San Diego in 1982. His other U.S. appearances include performing at the Hamptons at a festival to the memory of Benno Moiseiwitsch. In 1983, he stood in at short notice for the indisposed Claudio Arrau at a Prom concert, where he played the Burleske in D minor by Richard Strauss, and the Konzertstück in F minor by Weber. In 1987 he played at Eileen Joyce's supposed 75th birthday party (she was actually 79).

Fowke has taught at the RAM and at the Trinity College of Music. Since 2000 he has been pianist with the London Piano Quartet. He was a colleague and friend of Shura Cherkassky and has given lectures about Cherkassky's technique and approach to the piano. His recitals of traditional repertoire often end with lighter pieces such as Adolf Schulz-Evler’s Arabesques on themes from "An der schönen blauen Donau".

He has toured in many countries and has played under conductors such as Vladimir Ashkenazy, David Atherton, Rudolf Barshai, Norman Del Mar, Sir Alexander Gibson, Sir Charles Groves, Vernon Handley, Neeme Järvi, Tadaaki Otaka, Gennady Rozhdestvensky, Yuri Temirkanov, Klaus Tennstedt and Barry Wordsworth.

== Premiere performances and recordings ==
Philip Fowke's premiere performances include the Haydn Variations by John McCabe, a work dedicated to him (1983); and Richard Bissill’s Rhapsody for Piano and Orchestra, with the London Philharmonic Orchestra at the Royal Festival Hall in London.

He has made the premiere recordings of Sir Arthur Bliss's Piano Sonata and some of Bliss's smaller pieces (Miniature Scherzo, Study, Suite for piano, Triptych).

== Discography and repertoire ==
Philip Fowke's discography includes concertos and other works by:

- Arthur Bliss: Piano Sonata
- Benjamin Britten: Scottish Ballade
- Alan Bush: Cello Sonata
- Frédéric Chopin: Sonatas Nos. 2 and 3; Waltzes
- Franz Danzi: Horn Sonata, with Michael Thompson
- Frederick Delius
- Gerald Finzi: Fantasy and Toccata
- Alun Hoddinott
- Sergei Rachmaninoff: Concerto No. 2; Rhapsody on a Theme of Paganini
- Maurice Ravel: Concerto in G; Piano Concerto for the Left Hand; Valses nobles et sentimentales
- Camille Saint-Saëns: The Carnival of the Animals with Peter Katin
- Cyril Scott: Piano Quartet; Piano Quintet
- Pyotr Ilyich Tchaikovsky: Concertos Nos. 1 and 3
- "Virtuoso Piano Transcriptions": pieces by Ferruccio Busoni, Mikhail Glinka (transcribed by Mily Balakirev), Rachmaninoff, Carl Tausig, and Adolf Schulz-Evler (Arabesques on themes from "An der schönen blauen Donau", described by one reviewer as "one of the best modern recordings of this piece")
- "Piano Concertos from the Movies": pieces by Richard Addinsell, Hubert Bath, Jack Beaver, Richard Rodney Bennett, Bernard Herrmann, Leonard Pennario, Nino Rota, Miklós Rózsa and Charles Williams

Other composers in his repertoire include Richard Arnell, Bartók, Beethoven, Dohnányi, Gershwin, Grieg, John Ireland, Constant Lambert, Kenneth Leighton, Liszt, Poulenc, Alan Rawsthorne, Schumann, Richard Strauss, Tippett and Weber.

== Sources ==
- Patrick Garvey Management
