= Hubler =

Hubler or Hübler is a surname. Notable people with the surname include:

- Alfred Hübler (1957–2018), research physicist and director of the Center for Complex Systems Research
- Anna Hübler (1885–1976), German pairs figure skater
- Gary Hubler (1955–2007), crop duster and commercial transport pilot with over 16,000 flight hours from Caldwell, Idaho
- Heinrich Hübler (1822–1894), the hornist in the Dresden Royal Court orchestra from 1844 until his retirement in 1891
- Howie Hubler is the bond trader responsible for the single largest trading loss in history in the sub-prime crisis of 2008
- Jens Hübler (born 1961), retired East German sprinter who specialized in the 100 and 200 metres
- John Hubler Stover (1833–1889), U.S. Representative from Missouri
- Ludovic Hubler, French hitchhiker, most famous for his 5 year long tour of the world
- Mary Hubler, Democratic Party member of the Wisconsin State Assembly, representing the 75th Assembly District since 1984
- Richard G. Hubler (1912–1981), prolific American author of biographies, fiction and non-fiction
