= Martin Owen =

British hornist (born 1973)

Martin Owen (born 22 September 1973) is a British classical horn player. He studied at the Royal Academy of Music. He was principal horn of the Royal Philharmonic Orchestra (RPO) 1998–2008. In 2008, he was appointed principal horn of the BBC Symphony Orchestra.

He often plays guest principal horn with the major London orchestras, and others including the Berlin Philharmonic Orchestra and the Chamber Orchestra of Europe. He also has a varied solo career outside the orchestra and appears as soloist and chamber musician in some of the leading music festivals around the world. He is a regular performer at the Wigmore Hall; he made his debut there in 1997 in Benjamin Britten's Serenade for Tenor, Horn and Strings with Philip Langridge and Guildhall Strings. He has since performed the same work there with Toby Spence and the Scottish Ensemble. That collaboration led to a recording for Linn Records, of which Paul Driver said in the Sunday Times, "Owen's playing is a luxury for the ear". Other recordings include Mozart's Horn Concerto No. 4 with the RPO (RPO Classics label), Schubert's Octet with among others Michael Collins (Wigmore Hall Live label), Roderick Elms' Four Seasonal Nocturnes with the RPO (Dutton Records), and Franz Danzi's Symphonie Concertante with the Cadaqués Orchestra.

In October 2006, Owen gave the world premiere of Malcolm Arnold's Burlesque for horn and orchestra, with the RPO. The work, a recently recovered fragment, is thought to be part of an uncompleted horn concerto.

Recent performances include Schumann's Konzertstück for Four Horns and Orchestra with the BBC Philharmonic Orchestra at the 2007 BBC Proms, Britten's Serenade at the 2008 Bad Kissingen festival with the BBC Symphony Orchestra, and the London premiere of Elliott Carter's Horn Concerto at the Barbican Centre with the BBC Symphony Orchestra conducted by Oliver Knussen, for the composer's 100th birthday.

In 2009, he performed Knussen's Horn Concerto with the BBC Symphony Orchestra at the BBC Proms live on BBC Four TV and on BBC Radio 3.

In 2006, he was awarded a Fellowship by the Royal Academy of Music. He has been professor of horn there since 2008.

Martin Owen is represented by Worldwide Artists Management.

== Performances 2011 ==
- 3 February 2011 Bridgewater Hall, Manchester: Oliver Knussen horn concerto, Halle Orchestra/Knussen
- 9–14 March 2011 Vinterfestspill i Bergstaden, Norway: Recital and Chamber Concerts
- 19 March 2011 Trinity Church, Harrow: Britten Serenade, Trinity Orchestra/Murray
- 30 March – 6 April 2011 Kharkov, Ukraine: Recital and Masterclasses
- 15 April 2011 Hitchin: Britten Serenade, BBC Symphony Orchestra/Hussain
- 20–22 May 2011 Auditorio Nacional de Madrid, Spain: Knussen and Carter concerto's, Orquesta Nacional de Espana/Knussen
- 21 June 2011 Konzerthaus, Detmold, Germany: Britten Serenade, Detmolder Kammerorchester/Perl
- September 2011 Kharkov, Ukraine: Chamber concerts and Masterclass
