= Judith Bailey (composer) =

Cornish composer and conductor

Judith Margaret Bailey
- Born: 18 July 1941; Camborne, Cornwall, England
- Died: 16 March 2025 (aged 83); Cornwall, England
- Education: Royal Academy of Music
- Occupations: Clarinettist, composer, conductor

Judith Margaret Bailey (18 July 1941 – 16 March 2025) was a Cornish clarinettist, composer and conductor.

Bailey was born in Camborne, Cornwall. She studied at the Royal Academy of Music from 1959 to 1963, with Maurice Miles (conducting), Andrew Byrne (composition), Stephen Water (clarinet) and Leslie England (piano). From 1971 she worked as a composer and conductor. Bailey conducted the Southampton Concert Orchestra and Petersfield Orchestra (where she succeeded Kathleen Merritt in 1972) for almost 30 years before returning to her native Cornwall around 2001 where she conducted the Cornwall Chamber Orchestra and the Penzance Orchestral Society.

In 2001 Bailey was honoured as an Associate of the Royal Academy of Music, for showing distinction amongst her peers and in 2005 as a Bard of the Gorsedh Kernow for her contributions to music in Cornwall. She was a member of the Composers' Guild of Great Britain, the Cornish Music Guild, as well as a Trustee for the Cornwall Music Service Trust. A concert was held in Truro Cathedral to mark her 80th birthday, and her final orchestral work, Sea of Atlas, was premiered in December 2024.

Bailey died on 16 March 2025 in Cornwall after a short illness.

== Selected works ==
Orchestral

- Penmorvah, overture (1966)
- Trencrom, symphonic poem (1978)
- Chamber Concerto for 10 wind (1981)
- Symphony No. 1 (1981)
- Symphony No. 2 (1982)
- Seascape, for women's chorus, woodwind trio and orchestra (1985)
- Penwith, overture (1986)
- Fiesta for orchestra (1988)
- Concerto for clarinet and strings (1988)
- Havas; a period of summer, op. 44, for orchestra (1991)
- Concerto for orchestra, op. 55 (1996)
- Kessenyans kerth alls (Cliff Walk Symphony) (2007)
- Divertimento for two double basses and string orchestra (2023)
- Sea of Atlas, tone poem (2024)

Chamber

- Oboe Sonata (1977)
- Festive Concert Piece for wind band (1983-4)
- String Quartet (1985-6)
- Joplinesque for wind band, revised version of Holiday for Winds (1985)
- Wind Willows, woodwind trio (1989)
- Clarinet Quintet (1993)
- Caledonia, string quintet (2000)
- Four Quartets (after T.S. Eliot)
  - Burnt Norton (1990, rev. 2020)
  - East Coker (2015)
  - The Dry Salvages (2017)
  - Little Gidding (2018-2020)
- Double Wind Quintet (2022)
- Three Settings of Poems by Shelley
  - A widow bird
  - Music
  - To the moon
- Neap-Tide (Text: Algernon Charles Swinburne)
