= Horn Concerto (Hindemith) =

1949 Concerto by Paul Hindemith

- Horn concerto by Paul Hindemith
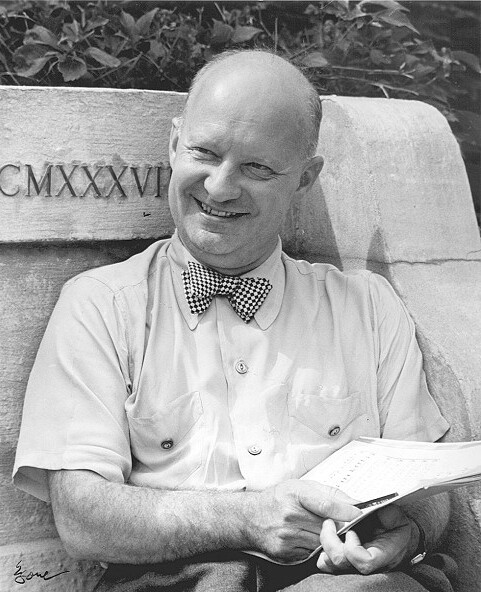
- Hindemith in the 1940s
- Year: 1949
- Form: Horn concerto
- Published: 1950 – Mainz
- Publisher: B. Schott's Söhne
- Recorded: January 21, 1951 – Cologne
- Duration: 15 minutes
- Movements: 3
- Scoring: French horn and small orchestra

Premiere
- Date: June 8, 1950
- Location: Baden-Baden
- Conductor: Paul Hindemith
- Performers: Dennis Brain; Paul Hindemith; Southwest German Radio Symphony Orchestra

The Horn Concerto is the only concerto for solo horn and orchestra composed by German composer Paul Hindemith. It was written in 1949.

== Background ==
Paul Hindemith had become a reputed composer in Germany before he left Germany in 1937, when he settled in the United States, became a Professor of Music at Yale University.and would eventually become an American citizen in 1946. The concerto was created out of Hindemith's fascination for the sound of the horn, as well as a leisure trip back to Europe, where he conducted a special orchestral concert with horn virtuoso Dennis Brain as the soloist. As a consequence of this meeting, Hindemith would go on to compose his horn concerto in April 1949 as a tribute to Brain.

Hindemith completed his Horn Concerto in 1949, in a process that took just a few months to complete, while he paused every other project he had been developing at the time. He premiered it on June 8, 1950, in Baden-Baden, with Dennis Brain as soloist and the Southwest German Radio Symphony Orchestra under Hindemith’s direction. As a sign of gratitude from the composer, he sent a copy of the full score to Brain with the inscription: "To the unsurpassed original performed of this piece from a grateful composer." The full score was first published in 1950 alongside a piano reduction. The autograph materials include an 88-page score located at Yale University, a 45-page piano reduction preserved at the Hindemith Institute in Frankfurt, and a set of sketches dated March 1949, also housed at the Hindemith Institute.

== Structure ==
A lightweight and thoroughly lyrical concerto, it has an approximate duration of fifteen minutes. It is scored for solo French horn and a small orchestra consisting of a modest woodwind section (one flute (also piccolo), two clarinets in B♭, two oboes, and two bassoons), timpani, and a standard string section. It is divided into three contrasting, untitled movements. The movement list is as follows:

1. Moderately fast
2. Very fast
3. Very slow – Moderately fast – Fast – Lively – Very slow

Because the concerto was written with Dennis Brain in mind, and knowing the premiere and the early performances would be carried out by Brain -who was an English performer- but would take place in Germany, both English and German terms appear on the score as indications, tempo markings and special directions to performers, English being more prevalent.

This work features an unusual design, consisting of two miniatures followed by a longer movement. The first movement, in the key of F major, loosely follows a sonatina form (two contrasting subject with no development). The second movement is a small scherzo with a rondo that is sharply interrupted by the horn, which ends the movement with a small fanfare. The final movement is much longer and it is bookended by two slow sections, with an additional two concentric, violent segments. The central-most section is a cadenza-like "declamation" by the horn. The score presents a poem written by Hindemith himself that is displayed at the beginning of the segment. Even though it was sometimes read aloud in earlier versions, it is generally not read for the public, but it is instead meant to translate into definite, meaningful words the nostalgic character of the note of the French horn. Instead, the horn's melody declaims in a way the eight lines of poetry,

Mein Rufen wandelt
In herbstgetönten Hain den Saal,
Das Eben in Verschollnes,
Dich in Gewand und Brauch der Ahnen,
In ihr Verlangen und Empfahn dein Glück.
Gönn teuren Schemen Urständ,
Dir Halbvergessener Gemeinschaft,
Und mir mein tongestallnes Sehnen.

[My calling wanders through the hall in the autumn-tinted grove, the evenness into the lost, you in the garb and custom of the ancestors, in their longing and reception your happiness. Grant the precious shades their rightful place, to you, half-forgotten fellowship, and to me my tone-filled yearning.]

— Paul Hindemith, Poem found in the cadenza of the Horn Concerto

Although the composer had been familiar with jazz since the 1920s, he made no reference to it in this concerto or in other concertos from the same period. The tone of this work is not overtly virtuosic; instead, it has a lyrical character, with particular attention paid to integrating the solo part smoothly into the orchestral texture.

== Reception ==
The horn concerto was a success, especially among musicians. Brain championed the concerto for many years after its first performance in 1950. The first recorded version of the concerto was made in Cologne, on January 22, 1951. On this occasion, Brain was the soloist, whereas Joseph Keilberth conducted the Cologne Orchestra at the Westdeutscher Rundfunk. Brain would perform and record the piece many more times between 1951 and 1956.

Conductor Otto Klemperer became embroiled in a disagreement with Brain just before a planned recording session on October 7, 1954, over the style and tempo at which the Horn Concerto had to be played, as Klemperer conducted it too slowly. In conversations with Walter Legge, he alleged, "I can't risk it with that old man; he's got no rhythm and he can't or won't accompany me." Fearing the work would never be published, Brain refused to attend the session. Since the orchestra supported Brain, Legge replaced the concerto with another work by Hindemith, resolving the conflict.

== Recordings ==
The following is a list of recordings of Paul Hindemith's Horn Concerto:

Recordings of Paul Hindemith's Horn Concerto
Horn	Conductor	Orchestra	Date of recording	Place of recording	Label
Dennis Brain	Joseph Keilberth	Cologne Orchestra	January 1951	West German Radio, Cologne, Germany	—
Dennis Brain	Paul Hindemith	Philharmonia Orchestra	November 1956	Kingsway Hall, London, UK	EMI
