= Kathleen Riddick =

British musician

Kathleen Riddick (17 July 1907 - 5 February 1973) was a British musician, one of the first women in Britain to establish herself in the male-dominated profession of conducting. To do so at a time when it was "considered impossible" for a woman to become a conductor Riddick was initially obliged to found her own ensembles to lead. They included the Surrey Philharmonic Orchestra in 1932 (of which she was the conductor for 40 years), the London Women's String Orchestra (later the Riddick Orchestra) in 1938, and The London Opera Group Orchestra which was led by Miriam Morley. But she also appeared as guest conductor of BBC orchestras and the London Symphony Orchestra.

== Education and early career ==
She was born at Epsom in Surrey into a musical family: both her parents were professional musicians and her father was the conductor of an amateur orchestra in Epsom. At the age of 10 she began studying cello at the Guildhall School of Music with Arnold Trowell (1887-1966), also taking composition courses. Her first professional engagements were as cellist for the Serre Trio (with Daphne Serre, piano, and Queenie Dyer, violin), which made regular BBC broadcasts in the early 1930s. In 1932 she also founded the Surrey String Players in Leatherhead, recruiting local amateurs. Later in the 1930s, Riddick gained a recommendation from Robert Jaffrey Forbes, principal of the Royal Manchester College of Music, to study conducting with Nikolai Malko in Salzburg.

== Orchestras ==
In 1945 the Surrey String Players became the semi-professional Surrey Philharmonic Orchestra. By May 1951 it had gained enough prestige to premiere Gordon Jacob's Horn Concerto at the Wigmore Hall with soloist Dennis Brain and Jacob himself conducting. This was followed on 29 October 1951 with a concert at the recently opened Royal Festival Hall, including the premiere of Stanley Bate's Introduction and Allegro, op 24, a work dedicated to Kathleen Riddick. She remained conductor of the Surrey Philharmonic for forty years until 1972, a year before her death. It is still playing today, conducted by Mark Fitz-Gerald, a student of Norman Del Mar.

Concurrently, Riddick founded a second, fully professional ensemble, the London Women's String Orchestra, which performed for the first time on 25 May 1938 at the Aeolian Hall, to very positive reviews. The programme included the challenging Music for Strings by Arthur Bliss. J A Westrup commented that "Riddick proved her worth by getting good results without any fuss or display. The absolute certainty of the ensemble was a sufficient tribute to her work at rehearsal". The orchestra engaged with contemporary composers, taking on UK and world premieres of music by Stanley Bate, Henk Badings, Arnold Cooke, Paul Hindemith, Bohuslav Martinů, Alan Ridout and others. The name was changed to the Riddick String Orchestra in 1944. It performed in regular concerts and BBC radio broadcasts from then until the early 1960s, sometimes under the baton of guest conductors.

Other conducting engagements included guest appearances with the BBC Symphony Orchestra (Bedford, 26 November 1943), the BBC Northern and BBC Scottish orchestras, as well as the London Symphony Orchestra.

== Personal life and legacy ==
In 1934 Kathleen Riddick married the musician George Bixley (1905-1995) and they lived at 1 Fountain Cottages, The Street, Ashtead in Surrey. Their daughter, Susan Bixley, was born in 1944 and is still involved with the Surrey Philharmonic Orchestra today. Kathleen Riddick was awarded the Order of the British Empire (OBE) in 1961 for services to music.

Along with a very few predecessors (such as Rosabel Watson, Florence Ashton Marshall, Gwynne Kimpton and Ethel Leginska) and her near contemporaries Avril Coleridge-Taylor, Iris Lemare and Kathleen Merritt, Riddick was one of the pioneers who opened up the world of conducting to women musicians in Britain. She inspired Ruth Gipps to begin her own conducting career. Like Riddick, all of these conductors also had to found their own orchestras in order to build up their reputations. (Nadia Boulanger was an exception: visiting from France in 1936, she became the first woman to conduct the London Philharmonic Orchestra).

== Selected premiere performances ==
- Malcolm Arnold. Symphony for Strings op.13 (first performance 1947)
- Henk Badings. Largo and Allegro (first performance of string orchestra version, 1940)
- Stanley Bate. Introduction and Allegro (first performance 1951). Concerto for piano and strings, op.24 (first performance 1939)
- Geoffrey Bush. Divertimento (first performance, 1947). Matthew Locke Suite (first performance, 1957)
- Hubert Clifford. Serenade (first performance, 1947)
- Arnold Cooke. Passacaglia, Scherzo and Finale (premiere of string orchestra version, 1940)
- Paul Hindemith. Theme and Four Variations for piano and strings (first UK performance, 1947)
- Gordon Jacob. Horn Concerto (first performance, 1951). Symphony for Strings, op.13 (first broadcast, 1945)
- John Lanchbery. Sinfonietta for strings (first performance, 1947)
- Bohuslav Martinů. Romanian Partita (premiere of string orchestra version, 1940)
- Alan Ridout. Concerto for harpsichord and double string orchestra (first performance, 1959)
- Cyril Scott. Irish Serenade (first performance, 1951)
