= Christus. Mysterium in a Prelude and Three Oratorios =

Musical composition by Felix Draeseke

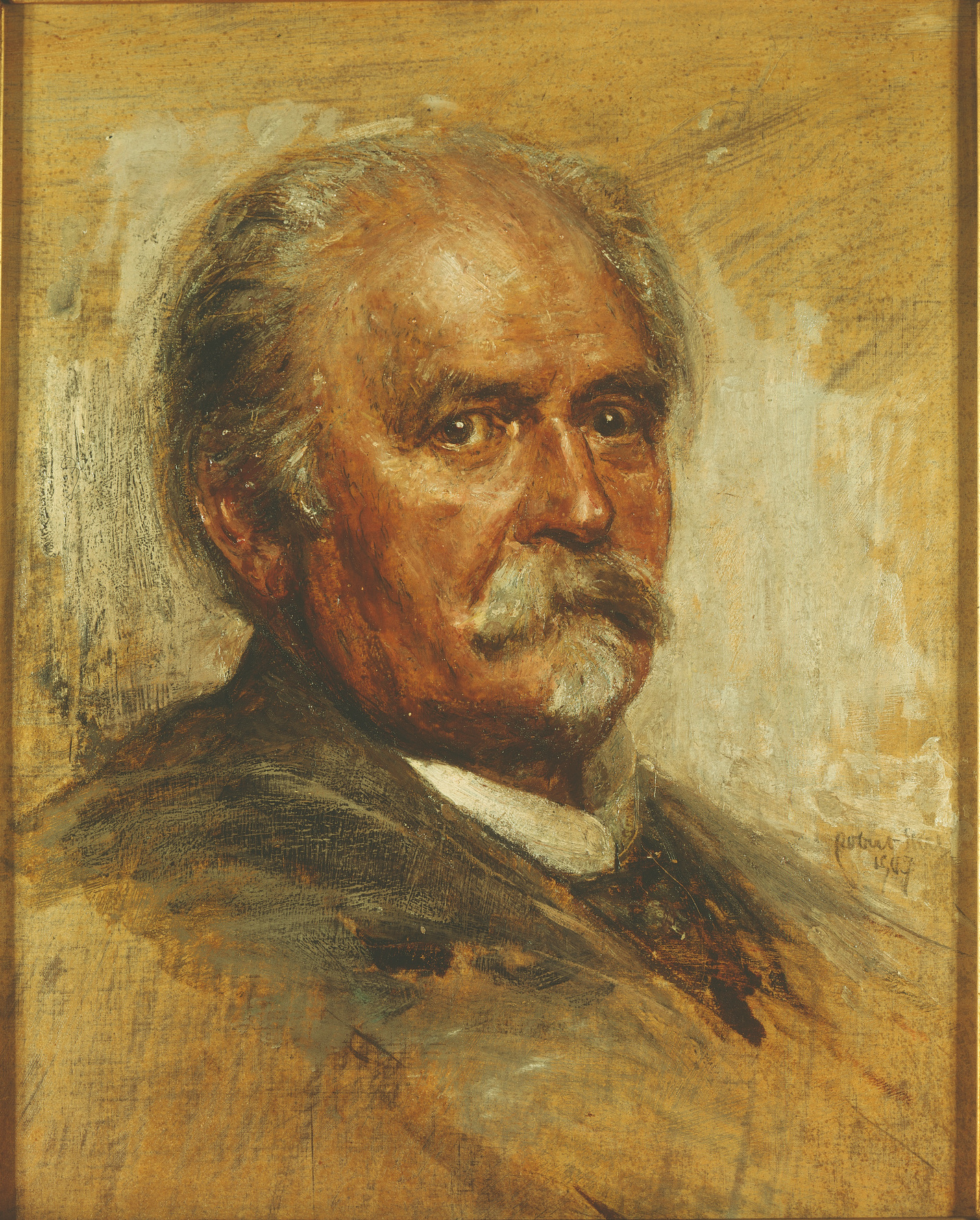
Felix Draeseke, oil portrait by Robert Sterl (1907)

Christus: Ein Mysterium in einem Vorspiele und drei Oratorien is a musical composition by Felix Draeseke consisting of a prelude and three oratorios completed in September 1899.

== History ==
It was Felix Draeseke's most impressive accomplishment and took him over thirty years to prepare and five years to compose. It spans opus numbers 70-73. Beginning as early as the 1860s, Draeseke and his brother-in-law, the Reverend Adolf Schollmeyer, began gathering ideas for the project. According to the composer's own program notes:

The words of the piece have been taken exclusively from the Holy Scriptures.... Individual alterations of minor significance had to be converted to dramatic speech frequently; things not found in the bible only appear very rarely.

Christus was premiered in Berlin in 1912, with Bruno Kittel conducting. Later that same year, Kittel conducted a second full performance in Dresden; these were the work's only full performances in Draeseke's lifetime. In 1990 and 1991 there have been the next two complete performances in Speyer and Heilbronn, which were a joint-venture of Udo-R. Follert in Speyer, and Hermann Rau in Heilbronn. These performances have been recorded and a CD-Edition was published by Bayer Records.

The suite has been performed by Felix Friedrich, organist from Altenberg, Germany since 1994 (Braunschweig St. Ulrici, Munich St. Bonifaz) and America (Farmington Hills, Michigan and Northville, Michigan). In 1995, at the 9th anniversary of the International Draeseke Society, he played them in the town church of Coburg.

== Structure ==
Christus is composed of four separate sections:

- Prelude – The Birth and Death of the Lord
- First Oratorio – The manifestation of the Christ
- Second Oratorio – Christ the Prophet
- Third Oratorio – Death and Triumph of the Lord

Though the work is composed of three oratorios, it bears more resemblance to Wagner's Ring Cycle than to traditional oratorio. Draeseke intended for it to fit into the category of Wagner's "Musikdrama," and in fact he used leitmotif throughout the work. Because of its length, a performance of Christus spans three evenings. The work was only performed twice in its entirety and, unlike Wagner's Ring Cycle, Draeseke preferred that his work be performed in a church. Draeseke wrote in program notes following the Christus premiere:

The composer never intended his work to be performed on the stage. It would be contrary to his intentions....A representation in the church would always be preferable to that in the concertroom.

Unlike traditional oratorio, the work contains no narrator, no Evangelist, and no recitative. Instead, a chorus of 150-200 members serves to advance the plot.

=== Third Oratorio ===
The third oratorio, Tod und Sieg des Herrn (Death and Triumph of the Lord), Opus 73, is the story of the Passion of Christ. It contains three parts – the Betrayal, the Crucifixion, and the Resurrection. Each part is divided into three scenes:

The Betrayal	The Crucifixion	The Resurrection
I. Preparing for Passover	I. Jesus before Caiphas	I. The Resurrection
II. The Last Supper	II. Jesus before Pilate	II. Further Manifestations of the Resurrection
III. Jesus in Gethsemane	III. The Walk to the Cross	III. Jesus reveals himself to his disciples
IV. The Betrayal	IV. Jesus on the Cross	IV. Ascension and Final Chorus

A chorus of 150-200 members functions largely as a plot-enhancing device, replacing the role that had traditionally been filled by recitative. Only in the form of the Chorus of Angels and the Chorus of the Faithful does the chorus play an observational role, commenting on the plot rather than becoming involved in it. Every other role assigned to the chorus becomes a character role. The following table illustrates the two observational roles (Angels and the Faithful) and the eight character roles represented by the chorus. Of these, the Chorus of the Pharisees and the Chorus of the People play perhaps the largest role in the lead-up to the Crucifixion; just as the crowd influenced Pontias Pilate, so does the chorus influence both Caiphas and Pilate in this oratorio. The choral writing resembles the turbae scenes of traditional oratorio, with one major difference: the cries and calls of the chorus lead directly to Christ's conviction.

	Name of Chorus	Angels	Faithful	Disciples	Bumbailiffs	Pharisees	Elders	People	Soldiers	Women	Guardians of the Grave
	Voice parts	SSAT	SATB I-II	ATBB	TB	TBB	TB	SATB	TB	SSA	TB
Part 1 - The Betrayal
I.	Preparing for Passover	1		2							
II.	The Lord's Supper	2		2							
III.	Jesus in Gethsemane	2									
IV.	The Treason			2							
Part 2 - The Crucifixion
I.	Jesus before Caiphas				1	4	1				
II.	Jesus before Pilate					4		5	1		
III.	The walk to the cross									1	
IV.	Jesus on the cross							7			
Part 3 - The Resurrection
I.	The Resurrection	1									1
II.	Other testifyings of the Resurrection		1								
III.	Jesus appeareth unto the disciples		1	3							
IV.	Ascension and Final Chorus		1								
