= Kathleen Merritt =

English musician and conductor (1901-1985)

Eva Kathleen Merritt MBE (31 August 1901 - November 1985) was a British conductor who led her own orchestra from the 1920s into the 1970s. She was best known as a pioneering woman conductor, and for her local music-making in Petersfield, Hampshire.

== Petersfield ==
Merritt was born in Petersfield to parents Willie and Emma Merritt. She attended Bedales School and the Royal College of Music (violin, piano and conducting). She joined the (then ad hoc) Petersfield Festival Orchestra in 1920 as a first desk violinist. She became conductor of the Sheet Choral Society from 1923, and of the Sheet Orchestra from 1924. From 1927 she founded and became conductor of the Petersfield Orchestra, a post she held until 1973. Merritt also served on the Petersfield Music Festival committee for 43 years. She lived at Bridge House in the centre of Petersfield.

The Petersfield Music Festival had its peak years in the 1930s: it was a four-day event, incorporating choral competitions and running multiple concerts featuring many regional musicians and singers. Along with Merritt, the local philanthropist Harry Roberts helped raise funds to build a new Town Hall, which opened in 1935 as the primary Festival venue. It is now known as the Festival Hall.

In 1939 she founded the Kathleen Merritt Orchestra. During the Second World War, while both the orchestra and the Petersfield Festival were paused, Merritt continued to encourage the development of local music making and choirs, working as music advisor for the National Union of Townswomen's Guilds. After the war her orchestra, renamed as the Southern String Orchestra in 1952, premiered many new works by British composers, including music by women composers.

== National significance ==
Merritt was known beyond her local music circles. She was a friend and correspondent of Ralph Vaughan Williams and a frequent broadcaster on the BBC Third Programme from the late 1940s and into the 1950s. She was violinist with the New English String Quartet from 1930 until 1935. Her orchestra, and sometimes sections of the orchestra, performed concerts in London and elsewhere, such as the well-received Purcell concert put on by the string section at Queen Mary Hall on 1 November 1938. She also founded the Southern Orchestra Concert Society, which organized concerts across the South of England. On 28 April 1960 Merritt organized and conducted a Wigmore Hall concert of 'Contemporary British Women Composers', featuring the music of Ina Boyle, Ruth Gipps, Dorothy Howell, Antoinette Kirkwood, Elizabeth Maconchy and Grace Williams.

Merritt was one of the pioneers who helped open up the world of conducting to women musicians in Britain. Others included the older generations of Florence Ashton Marshall, Gwynne Kimpton and Ethel Leginska, and her near contemporaries Avril Coleridge-Taylor, Iris Lemare and Kathleen Riddick. She retired in 1972, receiving an MBE for services to music. Her successor at the Petersfield Orchestra was Judith Bailey. Subsequent conductors were Nick Barnard (from 2001) and Robin Browning.

== Selected premiere performances ==
- Elisabeth Lutyens: O Saisons, O Chateaux! (1947)
- Grace Williams: The Dark Island, suite for string orchestra (1949)
- Norman Demuth: Divertimento No 1 for strings (1951)
- Gordon Jacob: Concertino for piano and string orchestra (1951)
- Elizabeth Maconchy: Piano concertino (1951)
- Philip Cannon: Songs of Delight; Sinfonietta for strings (1951)
- Kenneth Leighton: Symphony for strings (Op.3) (1952)
- Antoinette Kirkwood: Suite for string orchestra (1960)
- Michael Hurd: Sinfonia concertante (1968)
