= Antoinette Kirkwood =

English composer

Antoinette Adell Mahoney Kirkwood (26 February 1930 - 28 January 2014) was an English composer born in London, with Irish family connections.

== Early life ==
Kirkwood studied music with Claud Biggs at the Royal Irish Academy of Music in Dublin, and then piano and composition with Dorothy Howell and cello with Paul Tortelier at the Royal Academy of Music in Westminster. She often accompanied her mother, the soprano Rome Lindsay.

== Career ==
Radio Éireann broadcast Kirkwood's Symphony, op. 8, composed in 1953. This "very notable achievement", said one unidentified reviewer, established that Kirkwood "can write a memorable tune in a definite key and can hold the listener’s interest for a considerable time". From 1957 until 1961, Kirkwood was the founder and conductor of the St Columba's Orchestra, associated with St Columba's Church, Pont Street.

On 28 April 1960 the conductor Kathleen Merritt organized and conducted a Wigmore Hall concert of 'Contemporary British Women Composers', featuring music of Kirkwood alongside some of that of Ina Boyle, Ruth Gipps, Dorothy Howell, Elizabeth Maconchy, and Grace Williams.

For four years beginning in 1969, Kirkwood was a member of the executive committee of the Composers' Guild of Great Britain.

== Works ==
Kirkwood composed orchestral concert works, theatre music and two ballet scores, as well as instrumental and chamber pieces (including a cello sonata and the Rapsodie for harp) and many songs. Marie Fitzpatrick identifies a development in her style from the three folksong based orchestral Fantasies (1958–61), through the six Intermezzos for piano of 1959, showing the influence of Bartok, and also including more technically demanding explorations, such as the Soliloquy for guitar (1985). Her publishers are Curlew & Andresier and Bardic Edition. Selected works include:

Orchestral

- Symphony No. 1, op. 8 (1953, recording at the British Music Collection)
- Alessandro, op. 12 - (1957, music drama after the book by Gerard McLarnon)
- Musa the Saint, op. 16 - (1958, ballet after the book by Antoinette Kirkwood)
- Fantasia No. 1 for orchestra, op. 13 (1958)
- Fantasia No. 2, op. 14 (on an old Irish reel)
- Fantasia No. 3, op. 18 (1961, on an old Sligo tune)
- Suite for String Orchestra, op. 5 (1960)
- The Empty Stable, op. 10 - Incidental music
- Unhallowed, op. 4 - Incidental music

Chamber and instrumental

- Cello Sonata, op. 6 (1950)
- Six Intermezzi for piano (1959)
- Petite Suite, op. 20 No. 2 for Guitar
- Rapsodie No. 1, op. 21 No. 4 for Viola and Guitar
- Soliloquy, op. 19 No. 3 for Guitar (1985)
- Largo, op. 17 No. 1 for Flute and Piano
- Rapsodie, op. 19 No. 2 for Harp solo
- Sleepy Waters in the Moonlight, for 2 Violins and Violoncello
- Sonatina, op. 2 No. 1, piano (1946)
- Nocturne, op. 2 No. 2, piano

Vocal

- Carol, SATB and piano
- The Fly, op. 7 No. 1 (William Blake)
- The Barrel Organ, op. 7 No. 5 (Michael Ashe)
- Must she go?, op. 9 No. 1 (James Forsyth)
- Morning in Bengal, op. 9 No. 2 (Anthony Hayward)
- The Tourney, op. 9 No. 3 (Anthony Hayward)
- Remorse, op. 9 No. 4 (Michael O'Hagan)
- The Song of the Fisherman of Cacru, op. 11 No. 3 (James Forsyth)
- The Oyster-Catcher’s Song, op. 11 No. 4 (James Forsyth)
- Der Schiffbrüchige, op. 15 (Heinrich Heine)
- Krönung, op. 17 No. 2 (Heinrich Heine) High Voice and Strings

=== Recordings ===
- Six Intermezzi
- Sonata for Violoncello and Piano
- Suite for Strings, Orquestra de Cordas de Santana de Parnaíba, YouTube
- Women Composers - Vol. I, CD (Catherine Nardiello, CN-115)
- Women Composers - Vol. II CD (CN-116)

=== Performances ===
Kirkwood's Suite for Strings will be revived in a performance at the Royal Northern College of Music in Manchester on 15 March 2026.

== Personal life ==
In 1961, at St Columba's, Kirkwood married the writer Richard Phibbs (1911–1986), the author of Buried in the Country (1947). Her marriage, three children and caring for her mother and husband through their terminal illnesses, led to a complete cessation in her composition activity between 1961 and the late 1980s. During that period they were living at 56 Sutherland Street, London SW1.

On her husband's death in 1986 she raised money to re-publish two of his books (Cockle Button, Cockle Ben, for children, and Harmony Hill, four short stories), as well as resuming her own career as a composer. She died on 28 January 2014, aged 84.
