= Sheet, Hampshire =

Village and parish in Hampshire, England

Coordinates: 51.01538°N 0.92093°W

Sheet
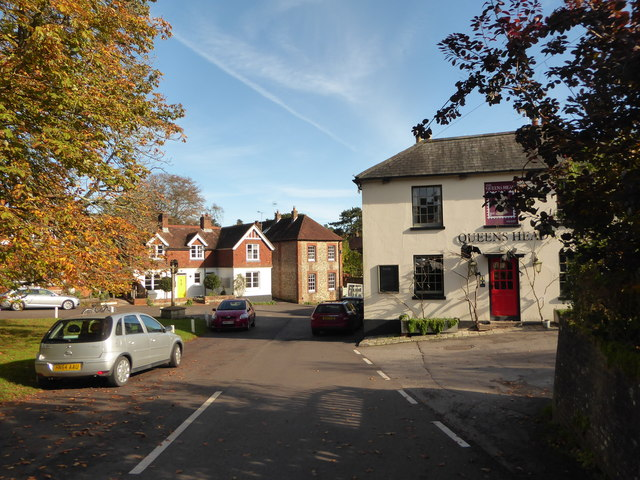
- From the village green

- Location within Hampshire
- OS grid reference: SU758245
- Civil parish: Petersfield
- District: East Hampshire
- Shire county: Hampshire
- Region: South East
- Country: England
- Sovereign state: United Kingdom
- Police: Hampshire and Isle of Wight
- Fire: Hampshire and Isle of Wight
- Ambulance: South Central
- UK Parliament: East Hampshire

Sheet is a village and civil parish in the East Hampshire district of Hampshire, England. It is 1.1 miles (1.8 km) northeast of Petersfield, just off the A3 road.

== Characteristics of the village ==
The centre of Sheet would conform to the chocolate box view of an English settlement. A village green with a huge tree surrounded by traditional cottages, a village hall, a pub and a red phone box with a church and primary school very nearby. The 20th century, however, saw much infilling between town and village until they became coterminous. New houses have continued to be built in the 21st century.

== History of the village ==
=== Early history ===
The first mention of Sheet was in a charter dated 70AD. The next mention is in the Domesday Book of 1086. During the period between 1147 and 1265 Sheet was divided between the Manor of Mapledurham, Durford Abbey and the Prior of St Swithin. The tax returns for Sheet were recorded in 1373 and came to £9. The first Sheet landowner to be named in an historical document was William Levechild, early in the 15th Century. By 1526 Sheet had a taxable population of 16.

=== 16th to 18th centuries ===
In 1536 Durford Abbey was dissolved, and with it the only hospital for the area's needy. In 1597, when the Borough of Petersfield was purchased by Thomas Hanbury, the boundary between it and Sheet was fixed in what is now Madeline Road. The oldest building in Sheet, Old Sheet House in Adhurst Hill, was constructed in 1670. By 1798 the land tax collected from Sheet had risen to £11 18s 6d.

=== 19th and 20th centuries ===
In 1858 the Bonham Carter family built a substantial home in Sheet, which they named Adhurst St Mary. In September 1866 an inquest was held at the Queen's Head Public house, and a verdict of death from natural causes passed on a 75-year-old man who had collapsed and died on Ramshill in the parish. During the Nineteenth Century the population of the village rose from 247 in 1801 to 784 in 1891.

In 1919 the village celebrated a "peace Day" with its bigger neighbour, Petersfield: events included a service of thanksgiving, a children's picnic and an evening "Smoking Concert". Both the first and second world wars brought changes to life in Sheet. The Sheet School log book records that the children raised 12/- in 1918 for the war savings scheme.

During World War II an aircraft factory in Southampton was bombed and several Hawker Typhoons stored under camouflage in a field between the A3 and Pulens Lane. A former village resident recalls that from 1940 to 1945 there was an air raid shelter for the pupils at the school dug into the bank in School Lane. After the war she recalls there being several food shops in the centre of the village- today there are none.

In 1978 a new village sign was commissioned. It was designed by Chichester Cathedral's top craftsman Harold Thompson, made by local blacksmith Steve Pibworth and unveiled in March 1978. The village continued to grow throughout the latter third of the 20th century and became a parish in 1990.

==== War memorials ====
===== Sheet village memorial =====
There is a war memorial outside St Mary Magdalene Church. It was placed outside the east end and unveiled in 1920. At that stage it had the 20 names of the Sheet men who died in what was then called The Great War. A plaque was subsequently added bearing the names of a further 6 men who died during the Second World War.

===== Churcher's College memorial =====
In 1920 the headmaster, the Rev William Bond, dedicated a war memorial in the Assembly hall to the 50 Old Churcherians killed in the First World War. After the second war had ended a further 47 names were added.

=== 21st century ===
In 2013 there were massive floods on 23 and 24 December. 2018 marked the 150th anniversary of the parish church. Vicar Richard Saunders called for

a celebration for the whole village of its iconic church at the heart of its community.

An appeal for memorabilia yielded enough material to fill the whole church, and was exhibited during several weeks in the summer of 2018. Also, on 1 July 2018 the village had a celebration day at which over £9,000 was raised for a local charity, The Rosemary Foundation. Sheet now has a "Village Agent" supported by Age Concern to support any vulnerable pensioners in the area.

== St Mary Magdalene Church ==
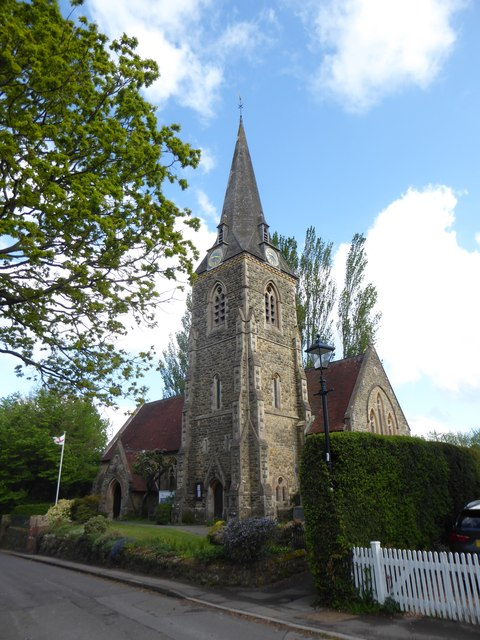
St Mary Magdalene Church

=== History ===
The church was made possible by the financial generosity of John Bonham Carter, whose father had been MP for Petersfield. It was designed by Sir Arthur Blomfield and consecrated by Bishop Vincent Ryan on 10 September 1868. By 1878 there had been 150 baptisms. The longest serving incumbent was George Sampson, who served from 1897 to 1910, during which time he baptised 344 children. Inside the church is a Bath Banner given to the church by a worshipper Admiral of the Fleet Sir Algernon Usborne Willis, a Knight Commander of the Order. The priest at Sheet has always been Chaplain at Churcher's College but during World War II he also ministered at Westmark Camp, a school for children evacuated from Portsmouth. After the war the population of the parish gradually grew as new roads spread out from Petersfield. In 1990 Sheet became a parish in its own right, the Rev Peter Ingrams changing his job title from Priest in charge to Vicar.

=== Building ===
The foundation stone was laid in 1867. It is built of local stone with Bath Stone dressing in the Early Decorated style. The reredo was donated by Mary, widow of John Bonham Carter after his death in 1905. The family also have several memorial stained glass windows within the church. In 1997 it was discovered the mortar between the stones was being used as nests by Mason bees, necessitating a major repair.

=== Clergymen who ministered at Sheet ===
==== Curates in charge ====
Richard Edward Coles (1868–1871); William Standen (1871–1878); Thomas Stephen Cooper (1878–1879); Lancelot Croasdaile Edgeworth (1879–1882); Julian Levett Bennett (1882–1887); George Sampson (1887–1910); William Stewart Fossett (1910–1912); Hedley Robert Burrows (1912–1914); William Edgar Henty Summers (1914–1916); Joseph Henry Harvey (1916–1917); Angus Forbes Simons (1917–1922); Herbert Conway Joyce (1922–1924); Percy John Miller (1924–1928); George Berkeley Mildred (1928–1930); Sydney Rosser Jones (1930–1934); James Denys Orpen (1934–1936);

==== Priests in charge ====
John Murray Yates Phillipson (1936–1940); Donald Keith Robertson (1940–1944); Norman Bull (1944–1945); Edmund Francis Kinnaird Dana (1945–1950); John Slack (1950–1953); Bennet Fermor Forster (1953–1957); Peter Ernest Jefford (1957–1961); Peter Napier Hamilton (1961–1963); Bernard Thomas (1963–1967); Arthur William Stawell Brown (1967–1975); Colin Harry George (1975–1980); John Kendall Coombs (1980–196); Brian Edwin Cook (1983–1986); Peter Douglas Ingrams (1986–1990)

==== Vicars ====
Peter Douglas Ingrams(1990–1996); Sarah Jean Chapman (1997–2002); Robert Mark Eastwood Dewing (2003–2011); Richard George Saunders (2012-)

=== Friends of Sheet Church ===
This organization was launched in 1996 to raise funds for the upkeep of the church. In the years 1996 to 2002 £40,000 was raised.

== Travel infrastructure ==
=== Bus ===
In 1953 the village had buses to Liss, Longmoor, Aldershot and Alton (from The Green) and to Midhurst, Guildford and Liphook from the Half Moon. Today there are some services, but most village residents own a car.

=== Road ===
Until 9 July 1992 Sheet was bisected by the A3. On that day the Petersfield by-pass was opened, transforming both Petersfield and Sheet. For this reason, perhaps, house prices have continued to rise in both town and village. Lords Farm, however, now backed on to the access road to the new route of the A3.

=== Rail ===
At one time in the 19th century as many as four railways were set to criss-cross Sheet but in the end only two were built. The Middy (Petersfield to Midhurst) passed through Sheet before heading for Rogate for South Harting (which confusingly was at Nyewood) until closure in 1955. The nearest railway line now is the Portsmouth Direct line with Petersfield, 1.1 miles (1.8 km) southwest of the village. The parish contains two level crossings, one in Kingsfernden Lane and one in Long Road.

== Education ==
=== Churcher's College ===
Churcher's College was founded by Richard Churcher (1659–1723) to educate 12 boys for service in the East India Company. It moved from its original site in College Street to its present home in Ramshill in 1881. In 1944 it joined the state system. It celebrated its 250th birthday in 1972 with a day of celebration opened by the footballer Jimmy Gabriel. It began to transition from a state school back into an independent one in 1979.

=== Sheet School ===
Sheet School opened in 1888. The Curate in charge George Sampson became the first school manager. It catered for boys and girls up to school leaving age. In 1958 it became a primary, with secdonary age pupils now going to Petersfield Secondary Modern at 11. As previously pupils who passed the 11 plus went to a grammar school. In 1992 the school had to close for one day due to a gas leak.

==== Friends of Sheet School ====
FOSS was formed in 2005 and supports its school through organising fund raising events.

=== West Mark Camp School ===
During the Second World War many school children from Portsmouth were evacuated to Sheet, and a boarding school was established at Westmark within the parish.

==== Use as a detention centre proposed ====
In 1958 a proposal emerged to convert the now disused site into a detention centre. Vice Admiral L.N. Brownfield, CB, CBE led the opposition and within 7 weeks the idea was quashed.

=== Pre school groups ===
There are two groups: The Little House at Pooh Corner Nursery has its own property at the junction of Town and Inmans Lanes; and Stepping Stones Playgroup which meets at Sheet Scout Hut.

== Village organisations ==
=== Former ===
- Sheet Village Club: existed from 1880 to 1840
- Sheet Troopers: Amateur Dramatic Club active during the 1950s and 1960s
- Sheet Cricket Club: played at Love Lane for many years
- Sheet Senior Citizens Club: 1965–1986

=== Current ===
- Sheet Association and Village Community Trust
- Sheet Parish Council: 8 members; meets monthly, except August
- Sheet WI, founded in 1935
- Sheet Scouts
- Sheet Film Club: it has regular films and an annual Film Festival
- Sheet & Tilmore Allotment Association

== Recreation facilities ==
=== Sheet Common ===
Sheet Common is a wooded area, of historic and scientific interest, with a ravine and parallel footpath running through its length. The woods surround an area of grass much used by the community and visitors.

=== Sheet Recreation Ground ===
Sheet Recreation Ground lies on a plot of land between Village Street, Inmans Lane and the old A3, from which there is vehicular access. On its edge is Sheet Scout Hut.

== Notable residents ==
- John Bonham-Carter, MP for Winchester; Chairman of Ways and Means, 1872–1874 lived at Adhurst St Mary
- Kathleen Merritt conducted the Sheet Choral Society and Sheet Orchestra in the 1920s
- Tim Rodber, pupil at Churcher's and full England Rugby Union international (44 caps; 2 British Lions)
- Admiral of the Fleet Sir Algernon Usborne Willis, GCB (KCB 1943; CB 1940); KBE 1945; DSO 1920 lived at Monks Lea

=== Centenarian ===
Beryl Danby née Lockyer (born Sheet August 29, 1914, died Hayling Island January 25, 2016) is the only village resident known to have reached the age of 100 years.

== Gallery ==
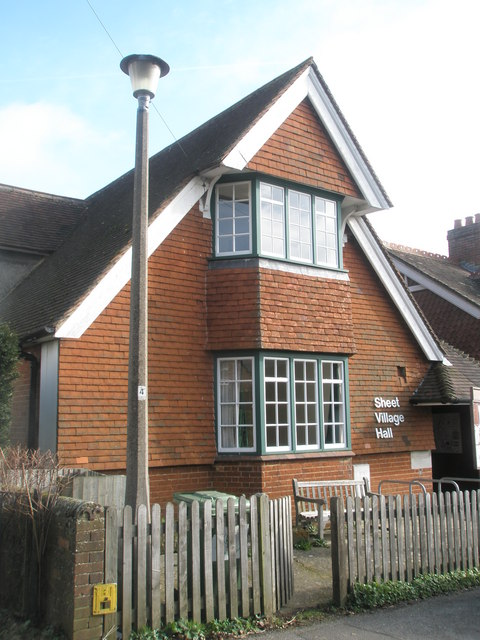
Sheet Village Hall

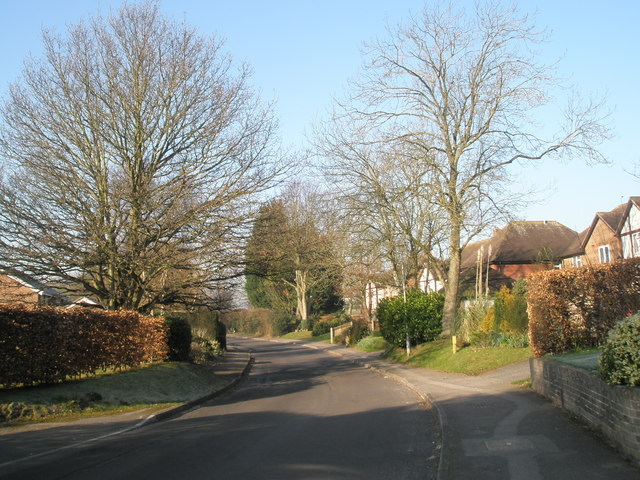
Love Lane

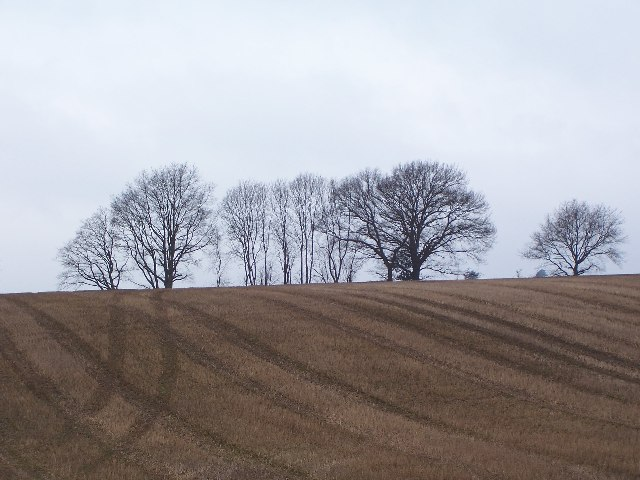
Westmark Farm

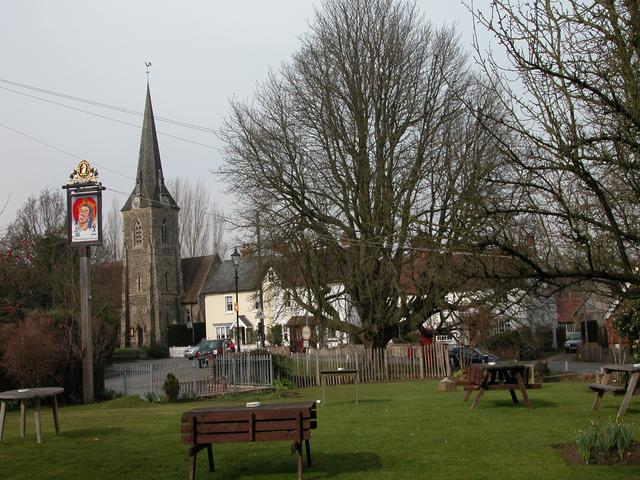
Village Green, parish church beyond

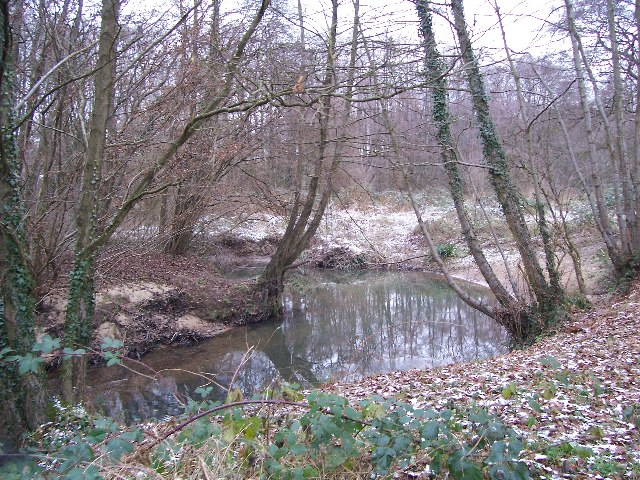
River Rother near Sheet Mill
