= Horn Concerto (Carter) =

Horn concerto by Elliott Carter

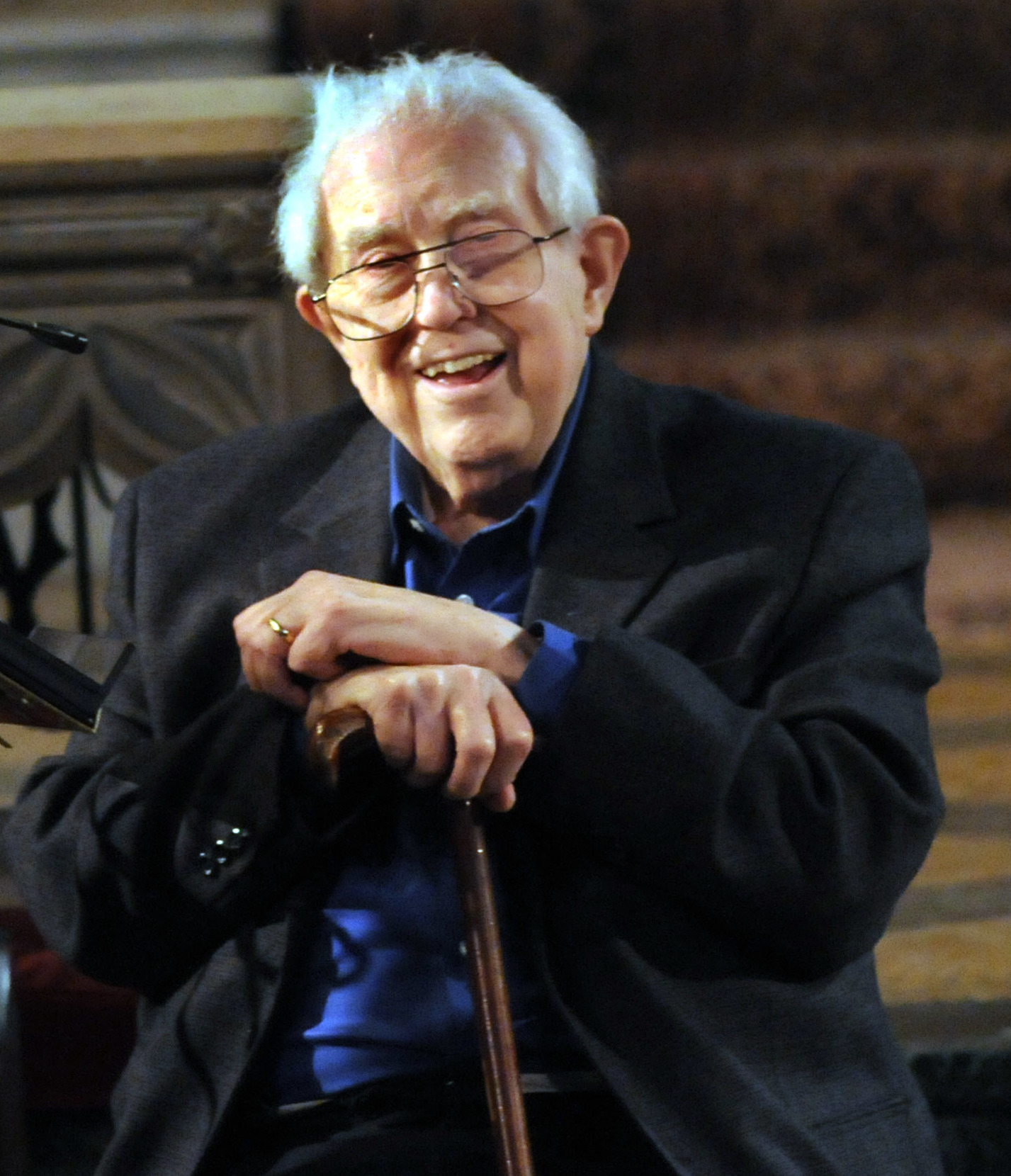
Elliott Carter in 2007

The Concerto for Horn and Orchestra is a horn concerto by the American composer Elliott Carter. The work was commissioned by the Boston Symphony Orchestra for the horn player James Sommerville. It was first performed on November 15, 2007, in Boston by Sommerville and the Boston Symphony Orchestra under the conductor James Levine.

== Composition ==
The concerto has a duration of 12 minutes and is composed in seven short connected sections, which Carter described in the program note as "presenting the many different facets of the horn, which are most remarkable and beautiful."

The work is scored for solo horn and an orchestra comprising two piccolos, flute, two oboes, cor anglais, two clarinets, bass clarinet, contrabass clarinet, two bassoons, contrabassoon, two trumpets, two trombones, tuba, three percussionists, piano, and strings.

== Reception ==
Reviewing the world premiere, Jeremy Eichler of The Boston Globe praised the concerto, writing:

The orchestra part is often spare by Carter's standards, with bright dabs of color flashing up from the strings, woodwinds, or early on, the percussion. Carter gives the soloist a workout in some rapid figurations, but the dominant character of this piece is surprisingly lyrical. In one striking passage, the horn part meanders above very delicately tinctured brass chorales, but throughout, Carter uses the horn's long solo lines as opportunities for vivid experiments in timbre, as if challenging the soloist to see how many masks he can don in quick succession.

Reviewing the United Kingdom premiere of the work (performed alongside Carter's Cello Concerto and Boston Concerto), Geoffrey Norris of The Daily Telegraph opined, "Both the Cello Concerto (with soloist Anssi Karttunen) and the Horn Concerto (Martin Owen) identified Carter's innate feel for instrumental timbre, his ability to tap, through his characteristic blend of complexity and clarity, the distinctive personality that an instrument possesses." Fiona Maddocks of The Guardian similarly remarked, "these late works confirmed a new brilliance and drama in Carter's musical voice."
