= Dale Clevenger =

American musician (1940–2022)

- Born: July 2, 1940; Chattanooga, Tennessee, U.S.
- Died: January 5, 2022 (aged 81) Brescia, Italy
- Genres: Classical
- Instrument: French horn

Dale Clevenger (July 2, 1940 – January 5, 2022) was an American musician who was the principal horn of the Chicago Symphony Orchestra from 1966 until his retirement in June, 2013. Before joining the CSO, he was a member of Leopold Stokowski's American Symphony Orchestra and the Symphony of the Air directed by Alfred Wallenstein. He was also principal horn of the Kansas City Philharmonic. He taught horn at the Jacobs School of Music in Indiana University.

== Musical career ==
Clevenger started playing trumpet at age 11, and switched to horn at age 13. Clevenger's father was president of the Chattanooga Opera Association, and he was exposed to live orchestral music at an early age.

He attended Chattanooga High School, commonly known as City High School, when the band program was under the leadership of A. R. Casavant, a scholar of marching band history, inventor, and innovator credited with creating precision drill. Clevinger's obituary relates that Casavant used to play him recordings of the Chicago Symphony during the school lunch hour.

Clevenger received a Bachelor of Fine Arts degree from Carnegie Mellon University, Pittsburgh, in 1962. He considered Arnold Jacobs and Adolph Herseth, former principal brass instrumentalists of the CSO, to be his mentors.

Clevenger performed with many ensembles worldwide, including the Berlin Philharmonic (under Daniel Barenboim). He took part in many music festivals including the Santa Fe Chamber Music Festival, Florida Music Festival, Sarasota, Marrowstone Music Festival, Bellingham, Washington, and Affinis Music Festival, Japan.

He won a Grammy Award for "The Antiphonal Music of Gabrieli," which he recorded with members of the Chicago Symphony brass section, as well as the brass sections of the Philadelphia Orchestra and the Cleveland Orchestra. His recording of Mozart's horn concertos was named Record of the Year in Hungary on the European label Hungaroton. He was also a featured soloist in the Chicago Symphony Orchestra's Grammy-winning Strauss Wind Concertos album, on which he plays Strauss's first horn concerto, as well as Andante for horn and piano in C major, with Daniel Barenboim accompanying on piano.

In 2003, Clevenger premiered John Williams' Concerto for Horn and Orchestra, a work written for him.

In addition to performing, Clevenger was an experienced conductor. He was the music director of the Elmhurst Symphony Orchestra from 1981 to 1995. He expanded his conducting career with numerous orchestras in North and Central America, Europe, Asia, and Australia, recently leading the Orquestra Sinfonica de Castilla y Leon with Daniel Barenboim as soloist.

Clevenger was president of the Italian Brass Week and taught at Roosevelt University during his time in Chicago. After retirement from the CSO in 2013, he also taught at the Jacobs School of Music at Indiana University.

== Personal life and death ==
Clevenger married Alice Anne Render of Louisville, Kentucky, also a skilled hornist. The couple had two sons, Mac and Jesse. His wife died in 2011. He also had two children from his first marriage, Michael and Ami. Subsequently, he was married to Giovanna Grassi, an Italian woman, for nine years until his death.

He died from complications of Waldenström's macroglobulinemia at a hospital near his residence in Brescia on January 5, 2022, at the age of 81.

== Critical reception ==
Critics have written of his playing as being "satin smooth (1975)," as having "mellow radiance and gentle flow...despite a few inconsequential fluffs (1978)," and of his "pianissimo trills and daredevil octaves (1981)." He has also been said to have "an unfailing sense of direction in phrasing (1983)", "well drawn legato phrases" despite "regrettable lapses of intonation in the fast ornamental section (1984)" and "smooth control (1991)." In 2010, his horn solos received some negative reviews from music critics at The New York Times and the Chicago Tribune, with the latter describing his work as "unpredictable horn solos, some firm, others faltering. Flaws in a performance of Mahler's 3rd Symphony on November 1, 2012, were cited in three separate reviews, with the Chicago Sun-Times calling his performance "saddening".

== Discography ==
- The Antiphonal Music of Gabrieli (1968)
  The Cleveland, Philadelphia, and Chicago Brass Ensembles
  Richard Burgin, conductor
- Britten: Serenade for Tenor, Horn and Strings
  Robert Tear (tenor), Chicago Symphonic Orchestra
  Carlo Maria Giulini, conductor
- Mozart: 3rd Horn Concerto K 447 (1985)
  Dale Clevenger, horn
  Chicago Symphony Orchestra
  Claudio Abbado, conductor
- Mozart: Four Horn Concertos (1996)
  Dale Clevenger, horn
  Franz Liszt Chamber Orchestra
  János Rolla, conductor
- Richard Strauss: Wind Concertos (2001)
  Dale Clevenger, horn
  Chicago Symphony Orchestra
  Daniel Barenboim, conductor
- The Chicago Principal: First Chair Soloist Play Famous Concertos (2003)
  Chicago Symphony Orchestra
- Haydn Horn Concertos (2006)
  Dale Clevenger, horn
  Franz Liszt Chamber Orchestra
  János Rolla, conductor
- Richard & Franz Strauss: Horn Concertos (2006)
  Steven Gross, horn
  Philharmonia Orchestra of Bratislava
  Dale Clevenger, conductor
