= Richard Bissill =

British musician

Richard Bissill is a French horn player, composer and arranger, and Professor at the Guildhall School of Music and Drama in London.

Born in Leicestershire, he was a member of the Leicestershire Schools Symphony Orchestra and he then studied horn and piano at the Royal Academy of Music before joining the London Symphony Orchestra in 1981. In 1984 he was appointed Principal Horn of the London Philharmonic Orchestra.

Since 1990 he has been Solo Horn with London Brass, with whom he has played many new pieces commissioned by the group, including several of his own compositions and arrangements. The ensemble's work has also included projects with popular music and jazz artists and Bissill has been featured in an improvisatory role many times.

Bissill is known for his involvement in jazz performance. Whilst still a teenager, he played with the BBC Radio Leicester Big Band and later the National Youth Jazz Orchestra with which he made several recordings. His improvisatory abilities and skill in jazz styles are well known throughout the world and he is often selected for sessions or by visiting bands from abroad requiring a horn player who can swing and/or improvise. In this capacity he has worked with Quincy Jones, Lalo Schifrin, Wynton Marsalis, Michel Legrand and many others.

Bissill has also improvised in a non-jazz context, recorded with the horn players Pip Eastop and Jonathan Williams.

As a teacher and player he understands the capabilities of the horn, particularly its low register, and this shows itself in his numerous works for horn ensemble, including Three Portraits for horn octet and Corpendium 1 for six horns.

He has also achieved success as a composer of orchestral music, his Christmas Carnival being frequently performed and having been recorded by the Royal Philharmonic Orchestra. His Sinfonia Concertante for clarinet, trumpet, horn and orchestra was commissioned by the London Symphony Orchestra to celebrate its centenary in 2004.

Bissill's Lone Call and Charge, for solo horn is frequently performed, for example where competition or audition rules stipulate performance of a recently composed work.

His Rhapsody for piano and orchestra was premiered by Philip Fowke and the London Philharmonic Orchestra at the Royal Festival Hall.

Bissill has served as professor of horn at the Guildhall School of Music and Drama since 1983, where he has trained numerous students who have gone on to professional careers internationally. He is also the author of The Good Brass Guide for horn, a widely used instructional method.
