= Adolf Schulz-Evler =

Polish composer (1852–1905)

Adolf Andrey Schulz-Evler (12 December 1852 – 15 May 1905) was a Polish-born composer.

Born in Radom, Poland (at that time part of the Russian Empire), he studied at the Warsaw Conservatory, then under Carl Tausig in Berlin. From 1884 to 1904 he taught at the Kharkiv Music School. He wrote about 52 original pieces.

His piano transcription of Johann Strauss II's Blue Danube Waltz: Arabesques on "An der schönen blauen Donau" has been recorded by many pianists, including Jorge Bolet, Jan Smeterlin, Marc-André Hamelin, Zlata Chochieva, Earl Wild, Leonard Pennario, Piers Lane, Byron Janis, Isador Goodman, Benjamin Grosvenor and Josef Lhévinne.

His list of works includes:

- Op 2: Invitation a la Valse (Jurgenson)
- Op 4: Variations in G major (Jurgenson)
- Op 5: Melodie (Jurgenson)
- Op 6: Nocturne in F major (Jurgenson)
- Op 8: Revelation I in B major (Jurgenson)
- Op 9: Revelation II in E♭ major (Jurgenson)
- Op 10: Revelation III in F major (Jurgenson)
- Op 11: Serenade (Jurgenson)
- Op 12: “Arabesques” Variations on the Blue Danube Waltz [Strauss] (Jurgenson)
- Op 14: Rhapsodie Russe for Piano & Orchestra (Jurgenson)
- Op 17: Etude pour les octaves (Jurgenson)
- Op 19: “Narzan” Valse (Jurgenson)
- Op 40: Pezzetino amichevole (Jurgenson)
- Donau Walzer (Selbstverlag)
- Echo de la Partita de J S Bach - Paraphrase de Concert (Johansen)
- Fantaisie (Johansen)
- Melodie No. 1 (Gutheil)
- O beaux veux bleus (Jurgenson)
- O toi toutes mes fleurs (Jurgenson)
- Poeme sans paroles (Johansen)
