= Hermann Neuling =

German horn player & composer (1897–1967)

Hermann Neuling (17 July 1897 – 29 January 1967) was a horn player and composer. He was engaged for many years as a low horn player at the Staatsoper Unter den Linden in Berlin and taught at the Conservatorium nearby. He was a contemporary of composer Bernhard Krol, who also played in the Staatsoper. Neuling was also a member of the Bayreuth Wagner Festival orchestra from 1931–64, and later taught at the İzmir State Conservatory from 1963-66.

Neuling is best known for composing the Bagatelle, a work for low horn and piano. This piece appears on most audition repertoire lists for low horn in Germany and throughout Europe. It became a standard audition piece in the mid-1980's, when it appeared on a Berlin Philharmonic Orchestra list for second horn (won by a Scottish horn player from Toronto, Canada, Fergus McWilliam). Neuling also wrote a set of 30 Studies for low horn in 2 volumes, 18 Special Etudes for low horn, 15 Special Technical Etudes for high horn, a method for F- and Bb-horn, a horn concerto (though only the solo part survived the bombing of Berlin) and a cadenza for Mozart's Concerto, K. 447.
