= Quintet for Piano, Strings and Horn (Draeseke) =

Felix Draeseke's Quintet for Piano, Strings and Horn in B♭ major, Op. 48, was composed in 1888 and published a year later by Kistner (Leipzig). It was dedicated to Adolph Stern.

== Scoring and structure ==
The work is scored for piano, violin, viola, cello and horn in F. It is structured in four movements:

1. Allegro con brio, ma non troppo vivace
2. Andante grave
3. Scherzo: Presto leggiero
4. Finale: Allegro con brio – Allegro vivace e leggiero

It was performed 29 June 1889 in Wiesbaden if not necessarily premiered then.

== Recordings ==
In 2017, Tyxart Records released a recording of the Quintet paired with the Sonata for Clarinet and Piano along with other chamber works for horn. There are at least two other recordings as of 2017, on Musikproduktion Dabringhaus und Grimm coupled with a work by Robert Schumann and another on Classic Produktion Osnabrück (also released in 2017).
