= Serenade for Tenor, Horn and Strings =

1943 song cycle by Benjamin Britten

- Song cycle by Benjamin Britten
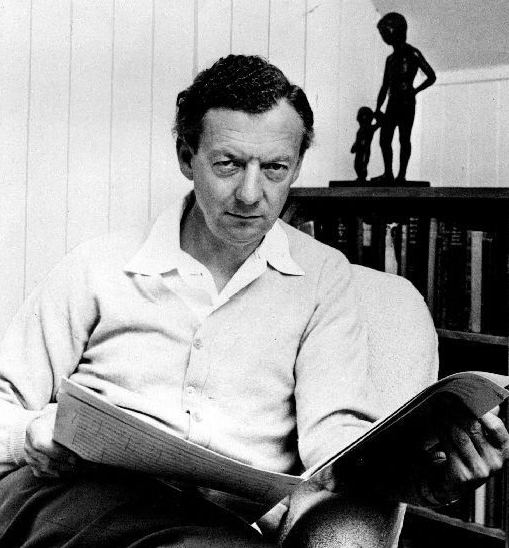
- Britten, c. 1968
- Opus: 31
- Text: Charles Cotton, Alfred, Lord Tennyson, William Blake, anonymous, Ben Jonson, John Keats
- Language: English
- Dedication: Edward Sackville-West
- Duration: about 20–25 minutes
- Movements: 8

Premiere
- Date: 5 October 1943
- Location: Wigmore Hall, London
- Conductor: Walter Goehr
- Performers: Peter Pears (tenor); Dennis Brain (horn)

The Serenade for Tenor, Horn and Strings, Op. 31, is a song cycle written in 1943 by Benjamin Britten for tenor, solo horn and a string orchestra. Composed during the Second World War at the request of the horn player Dennis Brain, it is a setting of a selection of six poems by English poets on the subject of night, including both its calm and its sinister aspects. The poets Britten chose to set for the Serenade range from an anonymous 15th-century writer to poets from the 17th, 18th and 19th centuries.

Britten's domestic partner – the tenor Peter Pears – and Brain were the soloists at the first performance. They later recorded the work, which has received subsequent recordings by tenors, horn players, orchestras and conductors from Britain, continental Europe, America and Australia.

== Background and first performance ==
Britten and his partner, Peter Pears, returned to Britain in April 1942 after three years in the United States. A few weeks later Britten was commissioned by the BBC to write incidental music for a documentary series on life in England to be broadcast to the US. The score was played by the RAF Orchestra, in which Dennis Brain was first horn. Britten was struck by Brain's skill and needed little persuasion to write a concert piece for him.

Brain may have been expecting a concerto, but instead Britten chose to compose a song-cycle with the horn and the singer as equal partners. Early in 1943 he caught measles so severely that he was in hospital for several weeks, and then convalesced at his country house in Suffolk. There, while also working on his opera Peter Grimes, he composed most of the Serenade. In April 1943 he wrote to a friend, "I've practically completed a new work (6 Nocturnes) for Peter and a lovely young horn player Dennis Brain, & Strings ... It is not important stuff, but quite pleasant, I think".

The Serenade contains Britten's first settings of English poems since On This Island in 1937. In selecting them Britten had advice from Edward Sackville-West, to whom he dedicated the work. Sackville-West wrote of the Serenade:

The subject is Night and its prestigia [conjuring tricks]: the lengthening shadow, the distant bugle at sunset, the Baroque panoply of the starry sky, the heavy angels of sleep; but also the cloak of evil—the worm in the heart of the rose, the sense of sin in the heart of man. The whole sequence forms an Elegy or Nocturnal (as Donne would have called it), resuming the thoughts and images suitable to evening.

Britten acknowledged the help Brain had given him with the horn part:

His help was invaluable in writing the work; but he was always most cautious in advising any alterations. Passages which seemed impossible even for his prodigious gifts were practised over and over again before any modifications were suggested, such was his respect for a composer's ideas.

The first performance was given at the Wigmore Hall in London on 15 October 1943 with Pears and Brain as soloists, and Walter Goehr conducting his eponymous string orchestra. It was well received: The Times called it "one of the most remarkable, and on any estimation most successful, of modern English compositions. … Britten's imagination seems to be most readily kindled by words, which strike an equivalent musical image out of him with the utmost spontaneity". The Musical Times thought it a "very likeable and uncommon piece", but was inclined to Britten's own view of the importance of the work, and thought the solo horn prologue and epilogue "unnecessary". Britten was pleased by the reception of the piece: he wrote to an American friend, "We had a lovely show, with wonderful enthusiasm and lovely notices".

== Content ==
The settings are framed by a horn prologue and epilogue; Britten had employed a framing device in his 1942 A Ceremony of Carols, and did so again in the prologue and epilogue to Billy Budd. In the Serenade both prologue and epilogue are performed by the horn alone, and in these movements Britten instructs the player to use only the horn's natural harmonics; this lends these short movements a distinctive character, as some harmonics sound sharp or flat to an audience accustomed to the western chromatic scale. The epilogue is to sound from afar, and to this end the final song does not include a part for the horn to allow the player to move off-stage.

=== Movements ===
The Serenade has eight movements:

1. "Prologue" (horn solo)
2. "Pastoral", a setting of "The Evening Quatrains" by Charles Cotton (1630–1687)
3. "Nocturne", a setting of "Blow, bugle, blow" by Alfred, Lord Tennyson (1809–1892)
4. "Elegy", a setting of "The Sick Rose" by William Blake (1757–1827)
5. "Dirge", a setting of the anonymous "Lyke-Wake Dirge" (15th century)
6. "Hymn", a setting of "Hymn to Diana" by Ben Jonson (1572–1637)
7. "Sonnet", a setting of "To Sleep" by John Keats (1795–1821)
8. "Epilogue" (horn solo; reprise of Prologue, played offstage)

=== Lyrics ===
The words or lyrics to each movement are:

==== 1. Prologue ====
(solo horn)

==== 2. Pastoral ====
The day's grown old; the fainting sun
Has but a little way to run,
And yet his steeds, with all his skill,
Scarce lug the chariot down the hill.

The shadows now so long do grow,
That brambles like tall cedars show;
Molehills seem mountains, and the ant
Appears a monstrous elephant.

A very little, little flock
Shades thrice the ground that it would stock;
Whilst the small stripling following them
Appears a mighty Polypheme.

And now on benches all are sat,
In the cool air to sit and chat,
Till Phoebus, dipping in the West,
Shall lead the world the way to rest.

Charles Cotton (1630–1687)

==== 3. Nocturne ====
The splendour falls on castle walls
And snowy summits old in story:
The long light shakes across the lakes,
And the wild cataract leaps in glory:

Blow, bugle, blow, set the wild echoes flying,
Bugle blow; answer, echoes, dying, dying, dying.

O hark, O hear, how thin and clear,
And thinner, clearer, farther going!
O sweet and far from cliff and scar
The horns of Elfland faintly blowing!

Blow, let us hear the purple glens replying:
Bugle, blow; answer, echoes, answer, dying, dying, dying.

O love, they die in yon rich sky,
They faint on hill or field or river:
Our echoes roll from soul to soul,
And grow for ever and for ever.

Blow, bugle, blow, set the wild echoes flying;
And answer, echoes, answer, dying, dying, dying.

Alfred, Lord Tennyson (1809–1892)

==== 4. Elegy ====
O Rose, thou art sick;
The invisible worm
That flies in the night,
In the howling storm,

Has found out thy bed
Of crimson joy;
And his dark, secret love
Does thy life destroy.

William Blake (1757–1827)

==== 5. Dirge ====
This ae nighte, this ae nighte,
Every nighte and alle,
Fire and fleet and candle‑lighte,
And Christe receive thy saule.

When thou from hence away art past,
Every nighte and alle,
To Whinnymuir thou com'st at last;
And Christe receive thy saule.

If ever thou gav'st hos'n and shoon,
Every nighte and alle,
Sit thee down and put them on;
And Christe receive thy saule.

If hos'n and shoon thou ne'er gav'st nane
Every nighte and alle,
The whinnes sall prick thee to the bare bane;
And Christe receive thy saule.

From Whinnymuir when thou may'st pass,
Every nighte and alle,
To Brig o' Dread thou com'st at last;
And Christe receive thy saule.

From Brig o' Dread when thou may'st pass,
Every nighte and alle,
To Purgatory fire thou com'st at last;
And Christe receive thy saule.

If ever thou gav'st meat or drink,
Every nighte and alle,
The fire sall never make thee shrink;
And Christe receive thy saule.

If meat or drink thou ne'er gav'st nane,
Every nighte and alle,
The fire will burn thee to the bare bane;
And Christe receive thy saule.

This ae nighte, this ae nighte,
Every nighte and alle,
Fire and fleet and candle‑lighte,
And Christe receive thy saule.

Lyke Wake Dirge, Anonymous (15th century)

==== 6. Hymn ====
Queen and huntress, chaste and fair,
Now the sun is laid to sleep,
Seated in thy silver chair,
State in wonted manner keep:
Hesperus entreats thy light,
Goddess excellently bright.

Earth, let not thy envious shade
Dare itself to interpose;
Cynthia's shining orb was made
Heav'n to clear when day did close:
Bless us then with wishèd sight,
Goddess excellently bright.

Lay thy bow of pearl apart,
And thy crystal shining quiver;
Give unto the flying hart
Space to breathe, how short so-ever:
Thou that mak'st a day of night,
Goddess excellently bright.

Ben Jonson (1572–1637)

==== 7. Sonnet ====
O soft embalmer of the still midnight,
Shutting with careful fingers and benign
Our gloom‑pleas'd eyes, embower'd from the light,
Enshaded in forgetfulness divine:

O soothest Sleep! if so it please thee, close
In midst of this thine hymn my willing eyes,
Or wait the "Amen" ere thy poppy throws
Around my bed its lulling charities.

Then save me, or the passèd day will shine
Upon my pillow, breeding many woes,
Save me from curious Conscience, that still lords

Its strength for darkness, burrowing like a mole;
Turn the key deftly in the oilèd wards,
And seal the hushèd Casket of my Soul.

John Keats (1795–1821)

==== 8. Epilogue ====
(solo horn – off stage)

== Recordings ==
In 2020 Gramophone published a survey of recordings of the Serenade. These are the recordings mentioned:

Year	Tenor	Horn	Strings	Conductor
1944	Peter Pears	Dennis Brain	Boyd Neel Orchestra	Benjamin Britten
1953	Peter Pears	Dennis Brain	New Symphony Orchestra of London	Eugene Goossens
1963	Peter Pears	Barry Tuckwell	London Symphony Orchestra	Benjamin Britten
1967	Peter Schreier	Gunther Opitz	MDR Symphony Orchestra	Herbert Kegel
1969	Gerald English	Hermann Baumann	WDR Symphony Orchestra, Cologne	Sir John Barbirolli
1970	Robert Tear	Alan Civil	Northern Sinfonia	Neville Marriner
1977	Robert Tear	Dale Clevenger	Chicago Symphony Orchestra	Carlo Maria Giulini
1988	Martyn Hill	Frank Lloyd	City of London Sinfonia	Richard Hickox
1988	Neil Mackie	Barry Tuckwell	Scottish Chamber Orchestra	Steuart Bedford
1988	Anthony Rolfe Johnson	Michael Thompson	Scottish National Orchestra	Bryden Thomson
1989	Jerry Hadley	Anthony Halstead	English Symphony Orchestra	William Boughton
1991	Christoph Prégardien	Ib Lanzky-Otto	Tapiola Sinfonietta	Osmo Vänskä
1994	Philip Langridge	Frank Lloyd	English Chamber Orchestra	Steuart Bedford
1995	Ian Bostridge	Marie-Luise Neunecker	Bamberg Symphony Orchestra	Ingo Metzmacher
1996	Adrian Thompson	Michael Thompson	Bournemouth Sinfonietta	David Lloyd-Jones
2003	Toby Spence	Martin Owen	Scottish Ensemble	Clio Gould
2005	Ian Bostridge	Radek Baborák	Berlin Philharmonic Orchestra	Sir Simon Rattle
2011	James Gilchrist	Jasper de Waal	Amsterdam Sinfonietta	Candida Thompson
2011	Mark Padmore	Stephen Bell	Britten Sinfonia	Jacqueline Shave
2013	Allan Clayton	Richard Watkins	Aldeburgh Strings	Markus Daunert

A 2022 recording featured Andrew Staples (tenor), Christopher Parkes (horn) and the Swedish Radio Symphony Orchestra, conducted by Daniel Harding.

== References and sources ==
=== Sources ===
==== Books ====
- Carpenter, Humphrey (1993). Benjamin Britten: A Biography. London: Faber and Faber. ISBN 978-0-57-114325-2.
- Kennedy, Michael (1993). Britten. London: Dent. ISBN 978-0-46-086077-2.

==== Web ====
- Hinds, Geoffrey; Bruce Baker (2005). "Britten's Serenade for Tenor, Horn and Strings". Mediant Studies.
