= Horn Concerto (Jacob) =

Concerto by Gordon Jacob

The Concerto for Horn and Strings is a concerto for horn and string orchestra in three movements by the English composer Gordon Jacob. The work was composed in 1951 for soloist Dennis Brain and premiered on 8 May 1951, with Jacob conducting the Riddick String Orchestra in Wigmore Hall, London. The piece has been regarded as one of the most popular horn concertos of the 20th century.

== Structure ==
The work has a duration of roughly 25 minutes and is composed in three movements:

1. Allegro moderato
2. Adagio molto
3. Allegro con spirito, quasi presto

== Reception ==
Reviewing its world premiere, The Musical Times wrote, "It is music designed for entertainment rather than edification, thrown off with the sure, light touch of a master craftsman, but though it in no way taxes the listener, it makes phenomenal demands on the soloist." In 2007, Andrew McGregor of the BBC also praised the concerto, writing:

Brain gave the first performance of Gordon Jacob's Horn Concerto in 1951: almost a string serenade in dialogue with the solo horn… and Jacob concentrates on the upper reaches of the instrument, where Brain’s gleaming sound was so strong and flexible, the first movement ending with an exultant top C. The slow movement is gentle, wistful nocturne, before the explosive brilliance of the finale: rapid tonguing, then a broad horn melody over scampering strings. It’s a genuinely catchy concerto...

== See also ==
- List of compositions for horn
