= Felix Draeseke =

German composer (1835–1913)

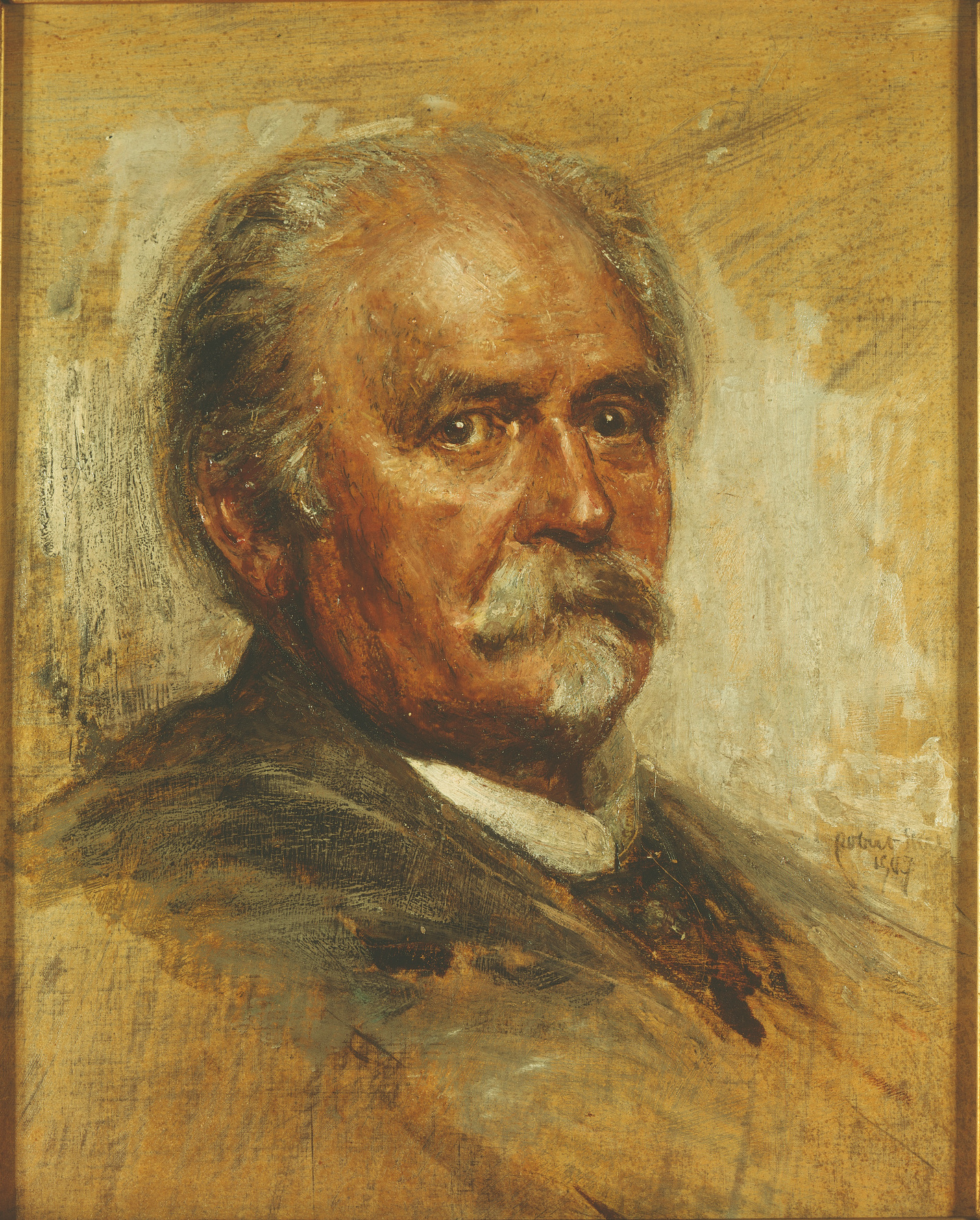
Felix Draeseke, oil portrait by Robert Sterl (1907)

Felix August Bernhard Draeseke (7 October 1835 – 26 February 1913) was a composer of the "New German School" admiring Franz Liszt and Richard Wagner. He wrote compositions in most forms including eight operas and stage works, four symphonies, and much vocal and chamber music.

== Life ==
Felix Draeseke was born in the Franconian ducal town of Coburg, Germany. He was attracted to music early in life and wrote his first composition at age 8. He encountered no opposition from his family when, in his mid-teens, he declared his intention of becoming a professional musician. A few years at the Leipzig Conservatory did not seem to benefit his development, but after one of the early performances of Wagner's Lohengrin he was won to the camp of the New German School centered on Franz Liszt at Weimar, where he stayed from 1856 (arriving just after Joachim Raff's departure) to 1861. In 1862 Draeseke left Germany and made his way to Switzerland, teaching in the Suisse Romande in the area around Lausanne.

Upon his return to Germany in 1876, Draeseke chose Dresden as his place of residence. Though he continued having success in composition, it was only in 1884 that he received an official appointment to the Dresden Conservatory and, with it, some financial security. In 1894, two years after his promotion to a professorship at the Royal Saxon Conservatory, at the age of 58, he married his former pupil Frida Neuhaus. In 1912 he completed his final orchestral work, the Fourth Symphony. On 26 February 1913 Draeseke suffered a stroke and died; he is buried in the Tolkewitz cemetery in Dresden.

== Music and styles ==
During his career Draeseke divided his efforts almost equally among compositional genres and composed in most of them, including symphonies, concertos, opera, chamber music, and works for solo piano. With his early Piano Sonata in C-sharp minor Sonata quasi Fantasia of 1862–1867 he aroused major interest, winning Liszt's unreserved admiration of it as one of the most important piano sonatas after Beethoven. His operas Herrat (1879, originally Dietrich von Bern) and Gudrun (1884, after the medieval epic of the same name) met with some success, but were subsequently neglected.

Draeseke keenly followed new developments in all facets of music. His chamber music compositions make use of newly developed instruments, among them the violotta, an instrument developed by Alfred Stelzner as an intermediary between viola and cello, which Draeseke used in his A major String Quintet, and also the viola alta, an instrument developed during the 1870s by Hermann Ritter and the prototype of viola expressly endorsed by Richard Wagner for his Bayreuth Orchestra.

A heavily contrapuntal composer, Draeseke reveled in writing choral music, achieving major success with his B minor Requiem of 1877–1880. His most contrapuntal work is called Christus. Mysterium in a Prelude and Three Oratorios, which requires three days for a complete performance, a work which occupied him between the years 1894–1899 but whose conception reaches back to the 1860s. According to some, Draeseke's Symphonia Tragica (Symphony No. 3 in C major, Op. 40) deserves a place alongside the symphonies of Brahms and Bruckner. Other orchestral works by Draeseke include the Serenade in D major (1888) and its companion of the same year, the symphonic prelude after Kleist's Penthesilea. Draeseke also composed a quantity of chamber music.

== Estimation ==
During his life, and the period shortly following his death, the music of Draeseke was held in high regard, even among his musical opponents. His compositions were performed frequently in Germany by the leading artists of the day, including Hans von Bülow, Arthur Nikisch, Fritz Reiner, and Karl Böhm. However, as von Bülow once remarked to him, he was a "harte Nuß" ("a hard nut to crack") and despite the quality of his works, he would "never be popular among the ordinary". Draeseke could be sharply critical and this sometimes led to strained relations, the most notorious instance being with Richard Strauss, when Draeseke attacked Strauss’s Salome in his 1905 pamphlet Die Konfusion in der Musik — rather surprising, as Draeseke was a clear influence on the young Strauss.

Draeseke's music was promoted during the Third Reich. After the Second World War, changes in fashion and political climates allowed his name and music to slip into obscurity. But as the 20th century ended, new recordings spurred a renewed interest in his music.

== Notable works ==
=== Orchestral ===
- Symphony No. 1 in G major, Op. 12 (1872)
- Symphony No. 2 in F major, Op. 25 (1876)
- Symphony No. 3 in C major, Op. 40 "Symphonia Tragica" (1885–6)
- Symphony No. 4 in E minor, WoO 38 "Symphonia Comica" (1912)
- Julius Caesar, symphonic poem (1860, revised 1865)
- Serenade in D major for small orchestra, Op. 49 (1888)
- Penthesilea, symphonic prelude (after Kleist), Op. 50 (1888)
- Jubel-ouvertüre, Op. 65 (1898)
- Concerto for Piano and Orchestra in E♭, Op. 36 (1885–6)
- Symphonic Andante for Cello and Orchestra in E minor, WoO 11 (1876)

An early symphony in C major, completed in 1856 and premiered that year, was still lost as of 1966.

=== Operas ===
- König Sigurd – opera in 3 acts after Emanuel Geibel's Sigurd (1853–7)
- Dietrich von Bern – opera in 3 acts (1877; revised by Otto zur Nedden, 1925)
- Gudrun – opera in 3 acts (1879–84)
- Bertram de Born – opera in 3 acts (1892–4)

=== Choral and vocal (religious and secular) ===
- Christus. Mysterium in a Prelude and Three Oratorios, Opp. 70–73 (1895–9):
  - Prelude: Die Geburt des Herrn (The Birth of the Lord), Op. 70
  - First Oratorio: Christi Weihe (Christ's Consecration), Op. 71
  - Second Oratorio: Christus der Prophet (Christ the Prophet), Op. 72
  - Third Oratorio: Tod und Sieg des Herrn (Death and Victory of the Lord), Op. 73
- Grand Mass in A minor, Op. 85 (1908–9)
- Requiem in E minor (1909–10)
- Columbus, Cantata for soprano, baritone, male chorus, and orchestra, Op. 52 (1890)
- Der Mönch von Bonifazio, Op. 74, a melodrama (1901)

=== Chamber music ===
- String Quartet No. 1 in C minor, Op. 27 (1880)
- String Quartet No. 2 in E minor, Op. 35 (1886)
- String Quartet No. 3 in C♯ minor, Op. 66 (1895)
- Quintet in A major 'Stelzner-Quintett' for 2 violins, viola, violotta, and cello (1897)
- Quintet in F major for 2 violins, viola, and 2 cellos, Op. 77 (1901)
- Quintet in B♭ major for piano, string trio and horn, Op. 48 (1888)
- Viola Sonata No. 1 in C minor (1892)
- Viola Sonata No. 2 in F major (1902)
- Clarinet Sonata in B♭ major, Op. 38 (1887)
- Cello Sonata in D major, Op. 51 (1890)

Portions of this page are reprinted by permission of the Internationale Draeseke Gesellschaft and International Draeseke Society/North America.
