= Ricardo Matosinhos =

Portuguese horn player and pedagogue (born 1982)

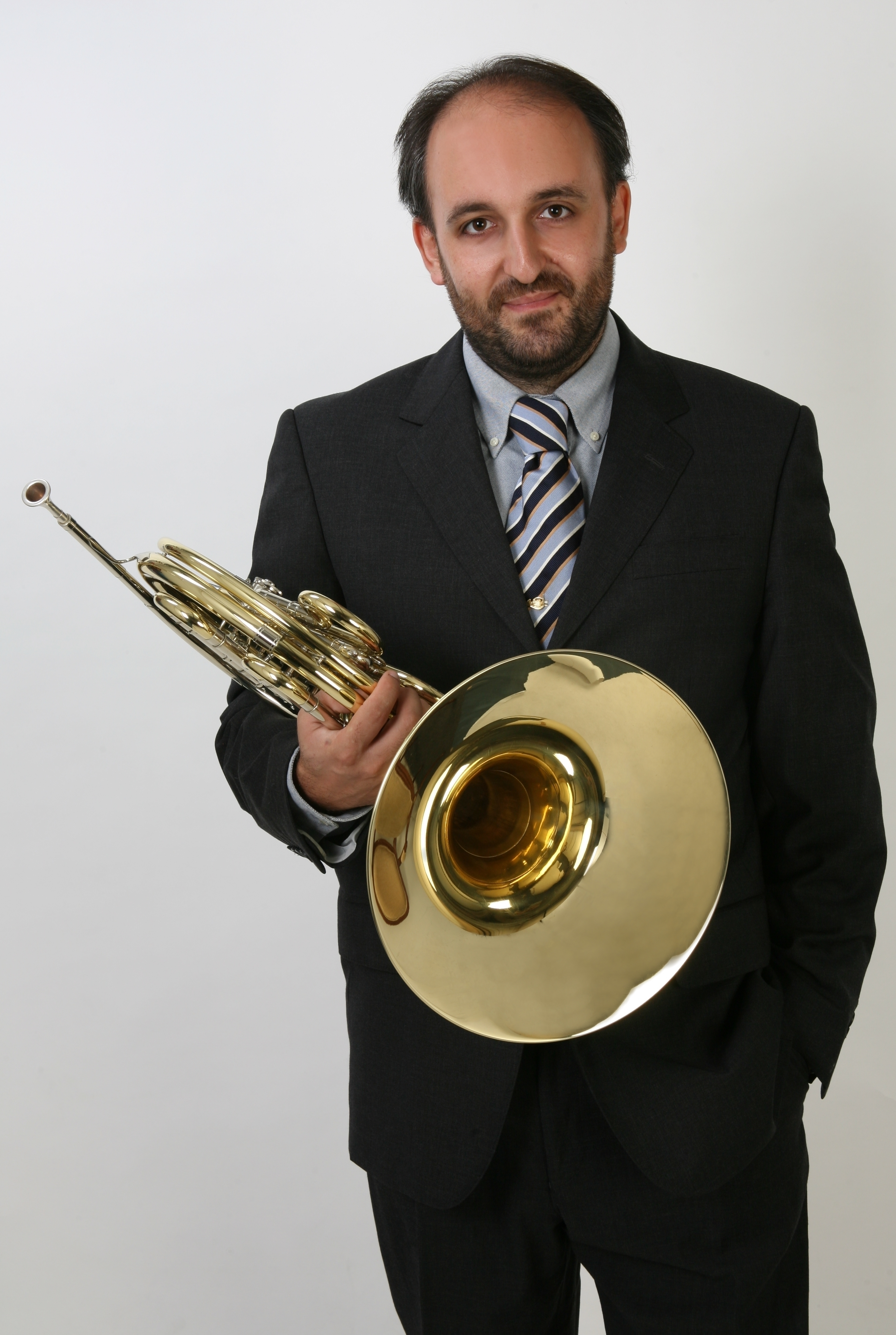
Ricardo Matosinhos

Ricardo Matosinhos (born 6 December 1982) is a Portuguese horn player and pedagogue.

== Biography ==
Matosinhos was born in 1982. He studied horn with Ivan Kučera at ESPROARTE and with Bohdan Šebestik at ESMAE. In 2012 he presented his master dissertation entitled "Bibliografia Selecionada e Anotada de Estudos para Trompa Publicados entre 1950 e 2011", presenting the results of this research at the http://www.hornetudes.com website. In 2021 he presented his doctoral research at Évora University: "Definition and analysis of the idiomatic elements found on selected works composed by horn players"

He wrote several teaching materials for horn, published by AvA Musical Editions and Phoenix Music Publications. His 15 low horn etudes were recognized with an honorable mention at the 2014 International Horn Society Composition Contest. In 2016 "Reflections for horn solo" and in 2018 "The Horn Calls you Back!" were prize winners at the Featured division of the International Horn Society Composition Contest. His music has been played all over the world including music competitions. He was invited as a guest teacher in several masterclasses and workshops in Portugal, Czech Republic, Estonia, Latvia, and EUA. Ricardo is currently teaching at the AMCC in Oporto Portugal. In 2004 he created the trompista.com website, a Portuguese horn related web community.
