= Konzertstück for Four Horns and Orchestra =

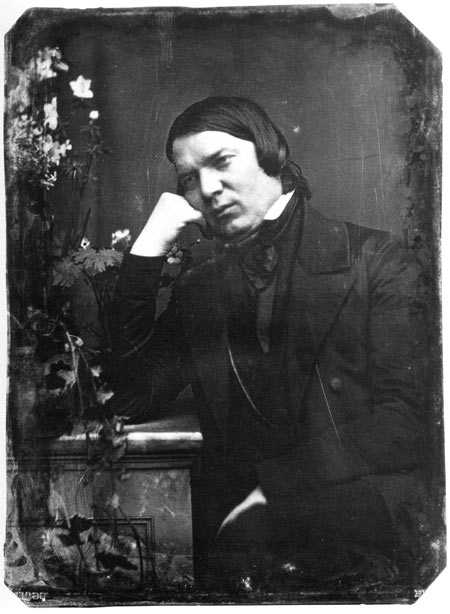
Robert Schumann in 1850, daguerreotype

The Konzertstück for Four Horns and large orchestra in F major, Op. 86, was composed by Robert Schumann in 1849 and premiered at the Leipzig Gewandhaus in 1850. The duration of the performance is approximately 18 to 20 minutes.

== History and reception ==
In 1849, Robert Schumann explored the horn as a solo instrument, dedicating to it an "Adagio and Allegro," Op. 70, before embarking on the composition of an orchestral work featuring four solo horns (having also composed the "Five Songs based on Heinrich Laube's Hunting Compendium" for men's choir and four horns, Op. 137 that same year). He worked on the sketches from February 18 to 20, and completed the orchestration from February 27 to March 11, 1849. Schumann was aware of the unusual instrumentation but also acknowledged the qualities of the new work, which he described as "something quite curious" but also as "one of my best pieces."

In a private performance with piano on October 15, 1849, at the residence of hornist Joseph Rudolf Levy, a member of the Dresden Court Orchestra, hornist Heinrich Hübler also participated. Hübler would present his own Konzertstück for the same instrumentation later.

On February 25, 1850, Julius Rietz conducted the premiere of the Konzertstück at the Leipzig Gewandhaus. The four soloists—Eduard Pohle, Joseph Jehnigen, Eduard Julius Leichsenring, and Carl Heinrich Conrad Wilcke—were members of the Gewandhaus Orchestra. Schumann noted a "friendly reception" by the audience. A reviewer for the Signale für die musikalische Welt wrote: "As strange as the idea of composing a quadruple concerto for horns may be, the composition itself is just as peculiar and valuable [...]". However, the work was deemed too lengthy.

The autograph of the Konzertstück is housed in the Berlin State Library. After Schumann had unsuccessfully offered the work to several publishers, including Simrock and Breitkopf & Härtel, Schuberth & Co. finally undertook publication of the work in 1851.

== Music ==
In addition to the four horns used as solo instruments, the Konzertstück calls for piccolo, two flutes, two oboes, two clarinets, two bassoons, two horns ad libitum, two trumpets, three trombones, timpani, and strings.

The three interconnected movements of the Konzertstück bear the following tempo markings:

1. Lebhaft
2. Romanze. Ziemlich langsam, doch nicht schleppend
3. Sehr lebhaft

The combination of a solo quartet and an orchestra is uncommon for the Romantic era, reminiscent more of forms such as the Baroque concerto grosso and the classical sinfonia concertante. In Schumann's Konzertstück, there is less of a direct juxtaposition between the soloists and the orchestra; instead, both groups often interact sonically in diverse ways.

Schumann recognized the technical possibilities of the newly developed valve horn compared to the natural horn and deliberately exploited them in this work. The 1st horn, often playing in a very high range, often takes the lead, but the other three soloists are equally involved throughout the work. The difficulty, especially in the 1st part, has led to the occasional employment of two players to handle the part.

The opening movement follows sonata form. After two loud orchestral chords, a motif consisting of fanfare-like ascending triplets followed by a legato figure appears, which also serves as the main theme of the movement. In the development section, a lyrical secondary theme dominates.

After only a short break, the slow, Romanze middle movement in D minor ensues, in ternary form. The main theme, played by oboe, violas and cellos, is taken up by the horns and spun out canonically. The middle section of the movement is in B Major and features rich chromaticism.

A triple trumpet fanfare introduces the highly spirited third movement, whose momentum and thematic design are shared with the first movement. In the development section of the finale, which is also in sonata form, a reminiscence of the Romance theme from the middle movement resurfaces.
