= Horn Concerto (Williams) =

2003 composition by John Williams

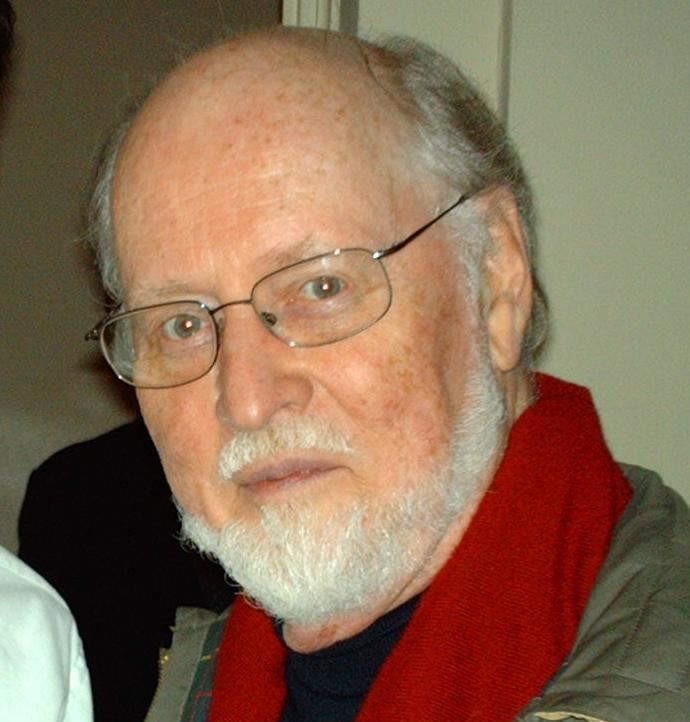
John Williams in 2006

John Williams's Concerto for Horn and Orchestra is a solo composition for horn with orchestra accompaniment. Williams wrote the piece for principal horn player Dale Clevenger of the Chicago Symphony Orchestra in 2003 on a commission from the Edward F. Schmidt Family Commissioning Fund. The premiere performance took place on November 29, 2003. The work is technically demanding of the performer, and Williams himself described it as a symphonic poem that explores a variety of colors and moods.

Unlike most instrumental concerti, this particular work is written in five movements.

1. Angelus: Far far away, like bells ... At evening pealing
2. The Battle of the Trees: Swift Oak ... Stout Guardian of the Door
3. Pastorale: There Came a Day at Summer's Full
4. The Hunt: The Hart Loves the Highwood
5. Nocturne: The Crimson Day Withdraws

Williams selected the quotes associated with each of the five movements from the works of various writers whom he admires.

== Instrumentation ==
This concerto is scored for a large orchestra, consisting of 3 flutes and piccolo, 3 oboes and English horn, 3 clarinets and bass clarinet, 3 bassoons and contrabassoon, 4 horns, 3 trumpets, 3 trombones, tuba, timpani, percussion, piano, celesta, harp and strings.
