= Heinrich Hübler =

German composer (1822–1893)

Carl Heinrich Hübler (Wachwitz, near Dresden, 4 December 1822 – 14 April 1893) was the hornist in the Dresden Royal Court orchestra from 1844 until his retirement in 1891. He was appointed royal chamber musician in 1851 and 1886 was given the title chamber virtuoso, in recognition of his merits.

In October 1849 Hübler engaged in a private performance in the apartment of Johann Rudolph Lewy in Dresden of Robert Schumann's Konzertstück for four horns and orchestra (op. 86) with the composer in attendance. The event inspired Hübler to compose his own Konzertstück for four horns and orchestra, written 1854–56, the single piece for which he is remembered. His horn concerto is also sometimes played and has been recorded.

Hübler was a founder of the Dresden Tonkünstler-Verein and remained a member of its governing board for more than two decades.

== Compositions ==
- Concert piece for 4 Horns and Orchestra in F (1854–56)
- Concerto for Horn and Orchestra
