= Cultural revolution in the Soviet Union =

1928–1931 forced cultural and ideological restructuring of Soviet society

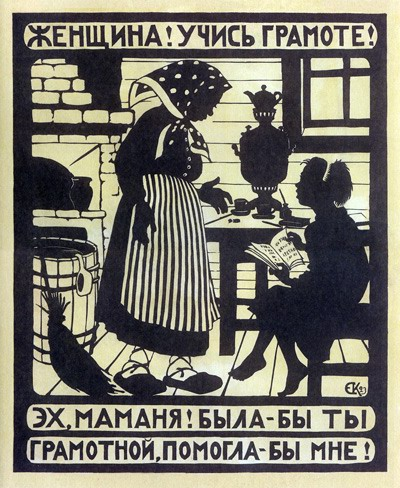
Woman, learn to read and write! - Oh, Mother! If you were literate, you could help me! A poster by Elizaveta Kruglikova advocating female literacy. 1923

The cultural revolution was a set of activities carried out in Soviet Russia and the Soviet Union, aimed at a radical restructuring of the cultural and ideological life of society. The goal was to form a new type of culture as part of the building of a socialist society, including an increase in the proportion of people from proletarian classes in the social composition of the intelligentsia.

The cultural revolution in the Soviet Union as a focused program for the transformation of national culture in practice often stalled and was massively implemented only during the first five-year plans. As a result, in modern historiography there is a traditional, but contested, correlation of the cultural revolution in the Soviet Union only with the 1928–1931 period. The cultural revolution in the 1930s was understood as part of a major transformation of society and the national economy, along with industrialization and collectivization. Also, in the course of the cultural revolution, the organization of scientific activity in the Soviet Union underwent considerable restructuring and reorganization.

== Terminology ==
Institute of Philosophy, Russian Academy of Sciences writes that the term "cultural revolution" in Russia appeared in the "Anarchism Manifesto" of the Gordin brothers in May 1917, and was introduced into the Soviet political language by Vladimir Lenin in 1923 in the paper "On Cooperation": "This cultural revolution would now suffice to make our country a completely socialist country; but it presents immense difficulties of a purely cultural (for we are illiterate) and material character (for to be cultured we must achieve a certain development of the material means of production, we must have a certain material base)".

However, many scholars attribute the idea to Alexander Bogdanov and consider his cultural movement Proletkult to be the beginning of the Cultural Revolution in the Soviet Union.

== Cultural revolution in the early years of Soviet power ==
The Cultural Revolution as a change in the ideology of society was launched soon after the October Revolution. On January 23, 1918, a Decree on Separation of Church from State and School from Church appeared. Items related to religious education were removed from the education system: theology, ancient Greek, and others. The main task of the cultural revolution was the introduction of the principles of Marxist ideology into the personal convictions of Soviet citizens.

To implement the program in the first months of Soviet power, a network of organs of the party-state administration of the cultural life of society was created: Agitprop (department of the Central Committee of the All-Union Communist Party (Bolsheviks)), Glavpolitprosvet, Narcompros, Glavlit and others. The institutions of culture were nationalized: publishing houses, museums, film factories; freedom of the press was abolished. The 1918 RSFSR Constitution, for its part, proclaimed that the workers and peasants should have the means to print and publish:

In order to secure for the workers actual freedom of expression of opinion, the Russian Socialist Federative Soviet Republic abolishes the dependence of the press upon capital, and puts into the hands of the working class and the poor peasantry all the technical and material means for the publication of newspapers, pamphlets, books, and all other products of the printing press, and provides for their free distribution throughout the country.

In the field of ideology, atheistic propaganda was widely developed, religion began to be persecuted, clubs, warehouses, production facilities were organized in churches, and strict censorship was introduced.

Most of the masses were uneducated and illiterate: for example, from the results of the census of the 1920 population, it followed that only 41.7% of the population over 8 years old could read in Soviet Russia. The cultural revolution primarily involved the fight against illiteracy, which was necessary for the subsequent scientific and technological development. Cultural work was deliberately limited to elementary forms, because, according to some researchers, the Soviet regime needed a performing culture, but not a creative one. However, the rate of elimination of illiteracy for a variety of reasons was unsatisfactory. Universal primary education in the Soviet Union was de facto introduced in the 1930. Mass illiteracy was eliminated after World War II. At this time, national alphabets of several nationalities (the Far North, Dagestan, Kyrgyz, Bashkir, Buryat, etc.) were created (first within the framework of Latinization, then within the framework of Cyrillization). A wide network of working faculties was developed to prepare working youth for admission to universities, to which the path of youth of proletarian origin was first opened regardless of the availability of primary education. In order to educate the new intellectual elite, the Communist University, Istpart, the Communist Academy, and the Institute of Red Professors were established. To attract the "old" scientific personnel, commissions were created to improve the life of scientists, and relevant decrees were issued.

At the same time, repressive measures were taken to eliminate intellectual political opponents: for example, more than 200 prominent representatives of Russian science and culture were expelled from the country on the Philosophical Steamship. Since the end of the 1920s, bourgeois specialists were "crowded out": "Academic Trial", "Shakhty Trial", "Industrial Party Trial", etc. Since 1929, "sharashki" began to operate – special technical bureaus of prisoners organized by the internal affairs bodies for carrying out important research and design works.

In the 1920s, discussions took place in Soviet public and party organizations about the methods and direction of the cultural revolution. For example, in the summer of 1923, a campaign to discuss "issues of life" was initiated by Leon Trotsky, who spoke in print with a series of articles published in the eponymous brochure (three editions were published).

Ideological hegemony in carrying out the cultural revolution has always remained with the party. The Komsomol played a major role in fulfilling the tasks of the party in carrying out the cultural revolution.

== Results of the cultural revolution in the Soviet Union ==
The successes of the cultural revolution include raising the literacy rate to 87.4% of the population (according to the census of 1939), creating an extensive system of secondary schools, and significant development of science and the arts. At the same time, an official culture was formed, based on Marxist-class ideology, "communist education", mass culture and education, which was necessary for the formation of a large number of production personnel and the formation of a new "Soviet intelligentsia" from the working-peasant environment.

According to one of the points of view, during this period, the means of Bolshevik ideologization made a break with the traditions of the centuries-old historical cultural heritage.

On the other hand, a number of authors have challenged this position and come to the conclusion that the traditional values and worldviews of the Russian intelligentsia, petty bourgeoisie and the peasantry were only slightly transformed during the cultural revolution, and the Bolshevik project of creating a new type of person, that is, the "new man", should be considered largely failed.

== See also ==
- Agitprop
- Hujum
- Marxist cultural analysis
- Cultural Revolution (China)
- Cultural and Ideological Revolution

== Sources ==
- Fitzpatrick, S. Education and Social Mobility in the Soviet Union 1921—1934. Cambridge University Press, 2002
- Douglas R. Weiner (2000). Models of nature. Ecology, Conservation and Cultural Revolution in Soviet Russia. USA: University of Pittsburgh Press. ISBN 0-8229-5733-7.
- Fitzpatrick, S. Cultural Revolution Revisited The Russian Review. Volume 58, Issue 2, pages 202—209, April 1999
- David-Fox, M. What Is Cultural Revolution? The Russian Review. Volume 58, Issue 2, pages 181—201, April 1999
- Fitzpatrick, S. The Cultural Front: Power and Culture in Revolutionary Russia. Cornell University Press, 1992
- Sheila Fitzpatrick (1984). Cultural revolution in Russia, 1928-1931. USA: Indiana University Press. ISBN 0-253-20337-6. "culture revolution ussr."
- P. H. Kneen (1976). Higher Education and Cultural Revolution in the USSR. UК: Centre for Russian and East European Studies, University of Birmingham.
- Stefan Plaggenborg (2000). Revolution and Culture. Cultural Landmarks in the Period Between the October Revolution and the Era of Stalinism / Translation from German by Irina Kartasheva. Saint Petersburg: Magazine «Neva». ISBN 5-87516-190-6.
- Mikhail Gerandokov, Gerandokova (2003). Cultural Revolution in National Regions: Myth or Reality. El-fa. ISBN 9785881955649.
- Nikolai Bukharin. Leninism and the Problem of the Cultural Revolution – in the Book: Nikolai Bukharin. Selected Works – Moscow: Politizdat, 1988 – p. 368–390
