= Union of Russian Composers =

Russian organization of professional composers (founded 1932)

The Union of Russian Composers (formerly the Union of Soviet Composers, Order of Lenin Union of Composers of USSR (Russian: Ордена Ленина Союз композиторов СССР) (1932– ), and Union of Soviet Composers of the USSR) is a state-created organization for musicians and musicologists created in 1932 by Joseph Stalin in the last year of the Cultural Revolution and first Five-Year Plan.

It became the official replacement for the various artistic associations which were present before like the Association for Contemporary Music and the Russian Association of Proletarian Musicians, two of the independently directed music committees. According to Richard Taruskin, the Union had fully materialized into its full-form well before 1948 and in time for the delivery of Zhdanov's Doctrine.

During the First Constituent Congress of post-Stalin Union of Soviet Composers, held in Moscow, in April 1960, the composer Dmitri Shostakovich was unanimously elected General Secretary. Currently, they are funded by the Russian government, specifically the Ministry of Culture, as well as various other state organizations.

== Priorities of the organization ==
Their mission, as stated in 2021, is to contribute to "the moral and ethical education of a modern person." They also stipulate key tenets that the Union are focused on addressing, such as:

- Development and strengthening of the composer organizations in all regions;
- Stimulation and creation of ample opportunities for composer creativity;
- Advance of musical culture and compositions of the Russian composers in Russia and abroad;
- Development and support of youth composer creativity;
- Protection of copyright of composers;
- Edition of notes and record of discs, and distribution of pieces of music;
- Creation of positive image of the organization for expansion of opportunities and strengthening of the authority on musical space of the Russian Federation.

== History ==
=== Stalin era ===
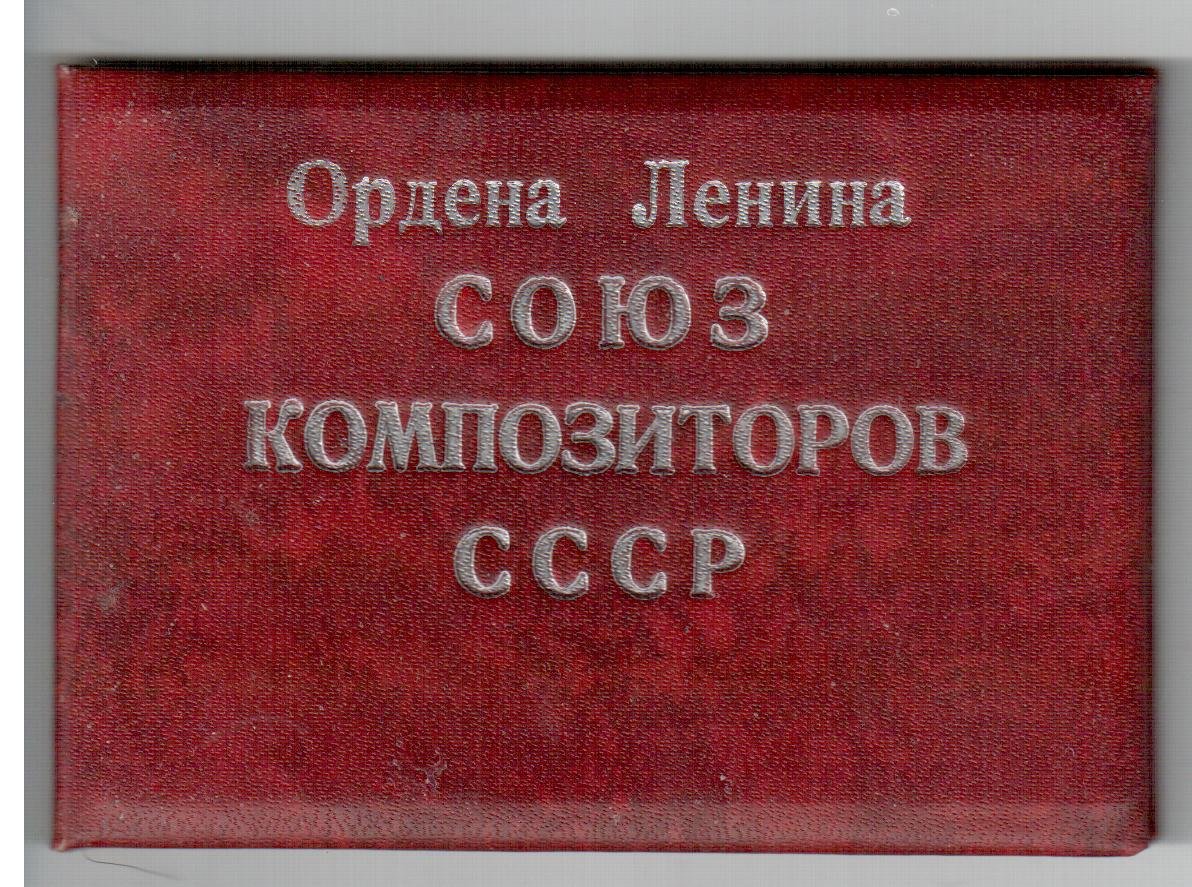
Union of Soviet Composers membership card, 1990

The Union of Soviet Composers was originally founded in 1932 at the behest of the Central Committee of the All-Union Communist Party of the Soviet Union in the final year of the Cultural Revolution, known as the Josef Stalin's first Five-Year Plan. The official memorandum entitled "On the Restructuring of Literary and Artistic Organizations," published on April 23 of 1932 notes that while there has been significant progress towards in the fields of literature and art to develop and further Socialist ideals, there was still more work that had to be done in order to fully render these two disciplines Socialist oriented. The reasoning for dissolving the disparate Associations and organizations that had existed prior to 1932 such as the Association for Contemporary Music, the Russian Association of Proletarian Musicians, the All-Union Org. of Associations of Proletarian Writers, and the Russian Association of Proletarian Writers was that these groups, with their distinct goals and aspirations, were stifling collective progress. This was dangerous, as the development of a socialist nation could only be facilitated if the arts and literature were focused on furthering party messaging. Such splinter groups were charged with "group insulation" and "isolation from political tasks," meaning that their focus was not enough of political education of the Proletariat. Thus, in effort to reign in their influence and centralize control over the arts and literature, they were disbanded and replaced with swift measure.

In 1939, the Union created its first leadership council called the Organizing Committee of the Union of Soviet Composers. This newly instated administrative body, originally created by two composers, the Soviet Ukrainian Reinhold Glière and Armenian Aram Khachaturian, was created as a way to consolidate management of all the separate branches of the Union of Soviet Composers. The original Board included musical luminaries from various musical distinctions, both literarily and performance-based, like M. Arkadiev, composer A. Goldenweiser, V. Gorodinsky, Boyarsky, compose Nikolai Myaskovsky, Sergei Vasilenko, Anatoly Alexandrov, A. Kerin, composer Mikhail Ippolitov-Ivanov, composer Vissarion Shebalin, B. Shekhter, Viktor Bely, B. Pshibyshevsky, composer Alexander Goedicke, and pianist Konstantin Igumnov.

From April 19 to 25, 1948, the first Constituent Congress was held where, during the proceedings, the governing bodies such as Secretariats and Chairmen were decided and the Charter was officially christened. Elected during the proceedings was the Inaugural Chairman of the Union, that being the Soviet Musicologist Boris Asafiev (1948–1949), along with the first General Secretary, a title belonging to the composer T.N. Khrennikov. During the year, the Board would hold 1–2 plenary sessions, where a Secretariat would be elected who would collectively guide the Union in between sessions and act as the leading force of the Union's affairs. Following the First Congress, they would be held every five years until 1991.

=== Post-Stalin era ===
In the late 1950s (1957 to be exact), there was a unanimous decision to create a Union of Soviet Composers that was not tied to the political party and was operated as an independent organization, equivalent in freedoms to their pre-1932 form. Ergo, the previous name was changed to the Union of Composers of the RSFSR and local organizations were then allowed to operate as satellite organizations of the main body, however retaining the localized independence. At the first Constituent Conference of the new Union in 1960, D. Shostakovich was elected as the General Secretary.

Under the leadership of Shostakovich, the musical and compositional directive of the organization reoriented towards prioritizing contemporary musicians and their works for public display and publishing. Due to his failing health, however, he left the leadership position after only eight years of service during the Second Constituent Congress in 1968. It was during the Second Constituent Conference that a couple new leaders would be elected, General Secretary being Stanislav Stempnevsky, while the chairman of the board would be Georgy Sviridov.

In 1973, during the Third Constituent Conference, that all-together new leadership would be elected. Rodion Shchedrin would become the chairman of the board and hold this position for the next 17 years of his life, while Andrei Eshpai would become the Deputy Secretary, Vladislav Kazenin the General Secretary and Deputy Chairman, and Yan Frenkel the second Deputy Chairman.

=== Post-Soviet era ===
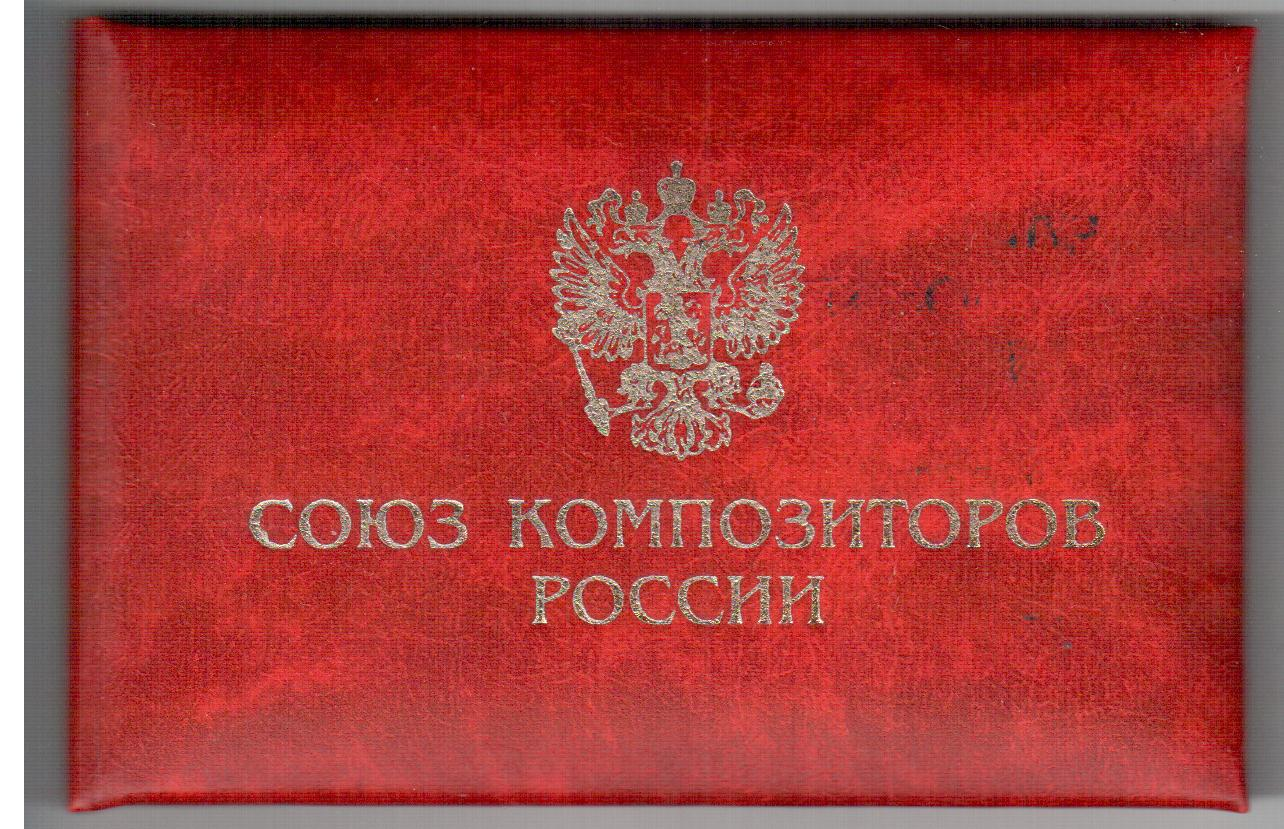
Union of Russian Composers membership card, 2009

From 1990 to 2014, the Russian composer Vladislav Kazenin held the position as Chairman of the Union.

There is "The International Prokofiev Competition" in honor of S. Prokofiev, the A. Petrov "All-Russia Prize for Young Composers" otherwise known as "Crystal Tuning Fork" Competition, the "International Competition for Young Composers" in honor of Pyotr Yurgenson ”, and "The Governor's International Youth Competition" or "The Youth Gavrilin Contest" in honor of V. Gavrilin.

In 2015, the Eleventh Constituent Congress was held where contemporary composer Rashid Kalimullin was elected as Chairman of the Union.

IN 2017, the Twelfth Constituent Congress was held and it was attended by some of Russia's contemporary composers. Attendees included A. Kroll, Vladimir Matetsky, Aleksandr Klevitsky, Vsevolod Zaderatsky, Alexey Rybnikov, Aleksandr Tchaikovsky, film composer Yuri Poteenko, and sculptor Alexander Sokolov.

== Festivals ==
Starting in/around the early 1970s, music festivals began to be held by the Union in various regional territories of the USSR including Omsk, Saratov Oblast, Ufa, Sverdlovsk Oblast, the Tyumen Oblast, Vilnius, Suzdal, Vladimir Oblast, Gorky Oblast (currently Nizhny Novgorod), and cities within the North Caucasus. Early festivals started a long-lasting tradition of annual gatherings of musical professionals and enthusiasts, some of the events being "Panorama of the Music of Siberia" (Novosibirsk), "Don Spring" (Rostov-on-Don), and "Festival in the Kuban."

Once the Soviet Union began to collapse, the music festivals around the early 1990s took on their own traditions and unique features. More and more were foreign composers being featured on concert programming and several festivals are seminal to note during this time.

Since the fall of the Soviet Union, much emphasis has been placed on children's repertoire. In the late 2000s, several festivals in Smolensk Oblast, Tver Oblast, Kirov Oblast and Saratov were dedicated to promulgating its public appeal. In recent years, new contemporary music festivals have emerged across Russia, including places such as Astrakhan Oblast, Krasnoyarsk, the "International Festival of New Music" in Kazan, "Musical Summer in Tuva" in Kyzyl and other events in the cities of Tuva.

In 2015, after 48 years of absence The Red Carnation International Festival-Competition of Patriotic Songs was reinstated as an annual tribute to the popularizing and legacy of Russian Patriotic repertoire.

== Leadership ==
- 1941–1942: Vissarion Shebalin (Chairman of the Board)
- 1948–1991 – Tikhon Khrennikov (General Secretary)
- 1948–1949: Boris Asafiev (First Chairman of the Union)
- 1960–1968 – Dmitri Shostakovich (General Secretary)
- 1968–? – Georgy Sviridov (Chairman of the Board)
- 1968–?: Stanislav Stempnevsky (Executive Secretary)
- 1978–?: Andrei Eshpai (First Secretary)
- 1978–?: Vladislav Kazenin (Executive Secretary then Deputy Chairman)
- 1978–?: Yan Frenkel (Second Deputy Chairman)
- 1990–2014: Vladislav Kazenin (Chairman of the Board)
- 2010–2015: Rashid Kalimullin (Deputy Chairman)
- 2015–: Rashid Kalimullin (Chairman)

== Members ==
According to M. Yakovlev, as of 1978 the total membership had totalled over 2,098.

1932–1963	Vissarion Shebalin	Composer (One of the original founders)
1932–1936	Alexander Mosolov	Composer
1932–1990	Alfred Schnittke	Composer
1951–?	Lyudmila Lyadova	Composer
1953–?	Elmira Nazirova	Composer
1968–1973	Georgy Sviridov	Composer
1973–?	Rodion Shchedrin	Composer

== Awards and honors ==
- 1968: The Order of Lenin
