= Likbez =

1920s–1930s Soviet campaign to eradicate illiteracy

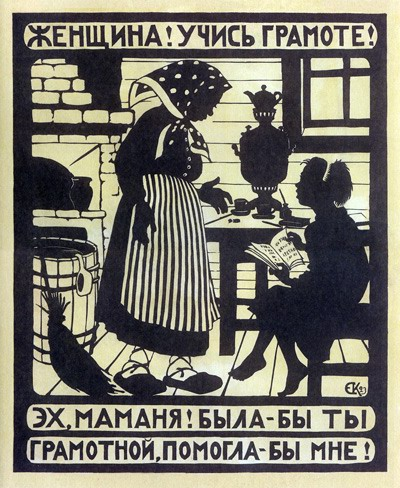
"- Woman, learn to read and write! - Oh, mother! If you were literate, you could help me!" A poster by Elizaveta Kruglikova advocating female literacy, 1923.

Likbez (Russian: ликбе́з, Russian pronunciation: [lʲɪɡˈbʲɛs]; a portmanteau of ликвида́ция безгра́мотности, likvidatsiya bezgramotnosti, [lʲɪkvʲɪˈdatsɨjə bʲɪzˈɡramətnəsʲtʲɪ], meaning "elimination of illiteracy") was a campaign of eradication of illiteracy in Soviet Russia and the Soviet Union in the 1920s and 1930s. The term was also used for various schools and courses established during the campaign. Nowadays, this term is sometimes used in Russian as slang for teaching an unprepared audience the basic concepts of any science, process or phenomenon.

== Background ==
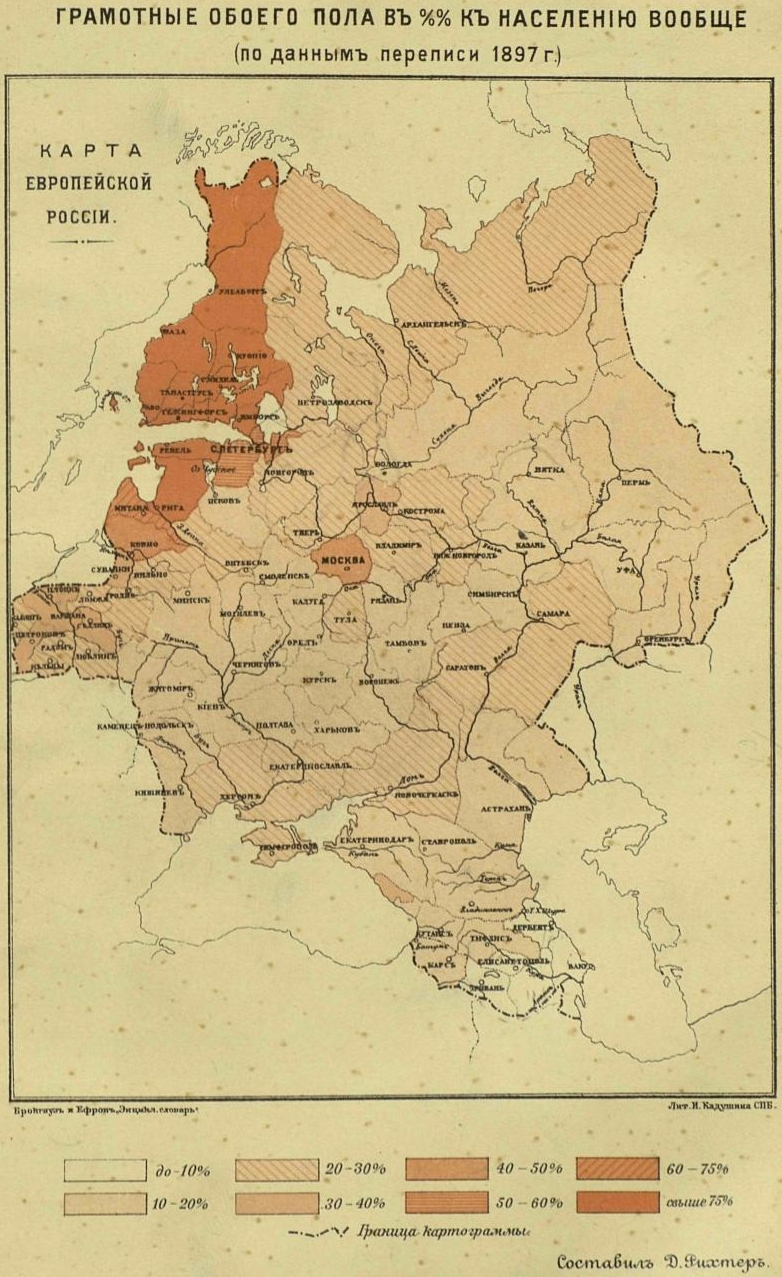
Geographical distribution of literacy in European Russia as per 1897 Russian Empire census data

In 1897, the overall literacy rate of the Russian Empire was an estimated 24%, with the rural literacy rate at 19.7%. There were few schools available to the population, particularly in rural areas. Until the early 20th century, there were still no specific curricular plans or guidelines in the zemstvo schools. In 1891, the literacy schools came under church administration, and maintained a largely religious curriculum, which emphasized the teaching of Old Church Slavonic. The peasantry was largely self-educated, and often relied on schools run by political dissidents for the latter period of tsarist rule. Facing a growing opposition from the general populace, Tsar Alexander II announced a decree that would raise the tuition fee for schools, thus preventing further social mobility for serfs who were allowed free mobility. During the reign of Tsar Nicholas II (1894–1917) liberals pushed for a universal education system, which scholars predict may have expanded if it were not for World War I.

== Bolshevik literacy campaign ==
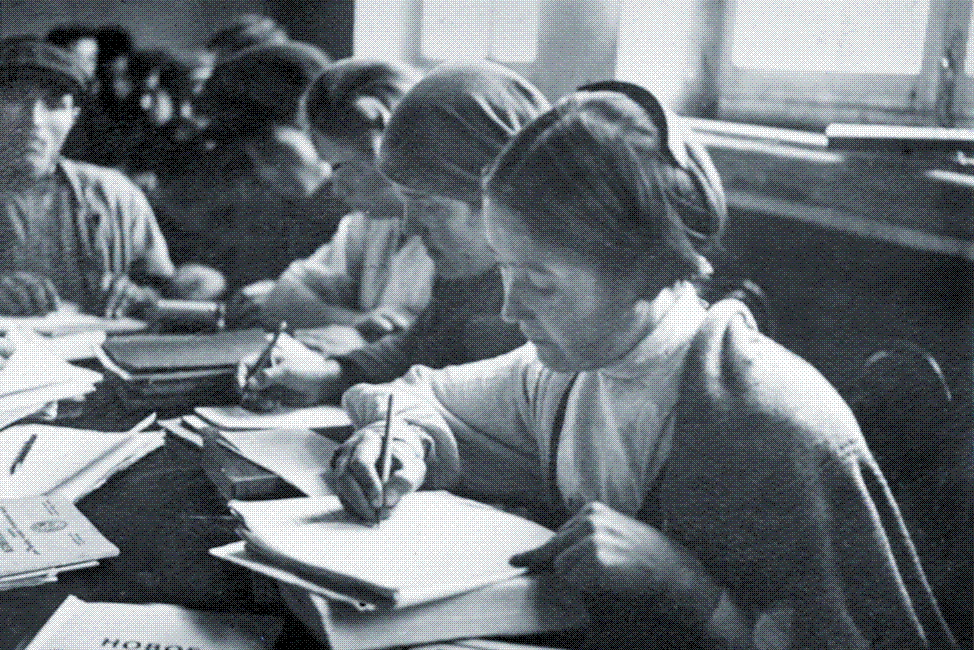
The population learned to read and write. Cheboksary, 1930s.

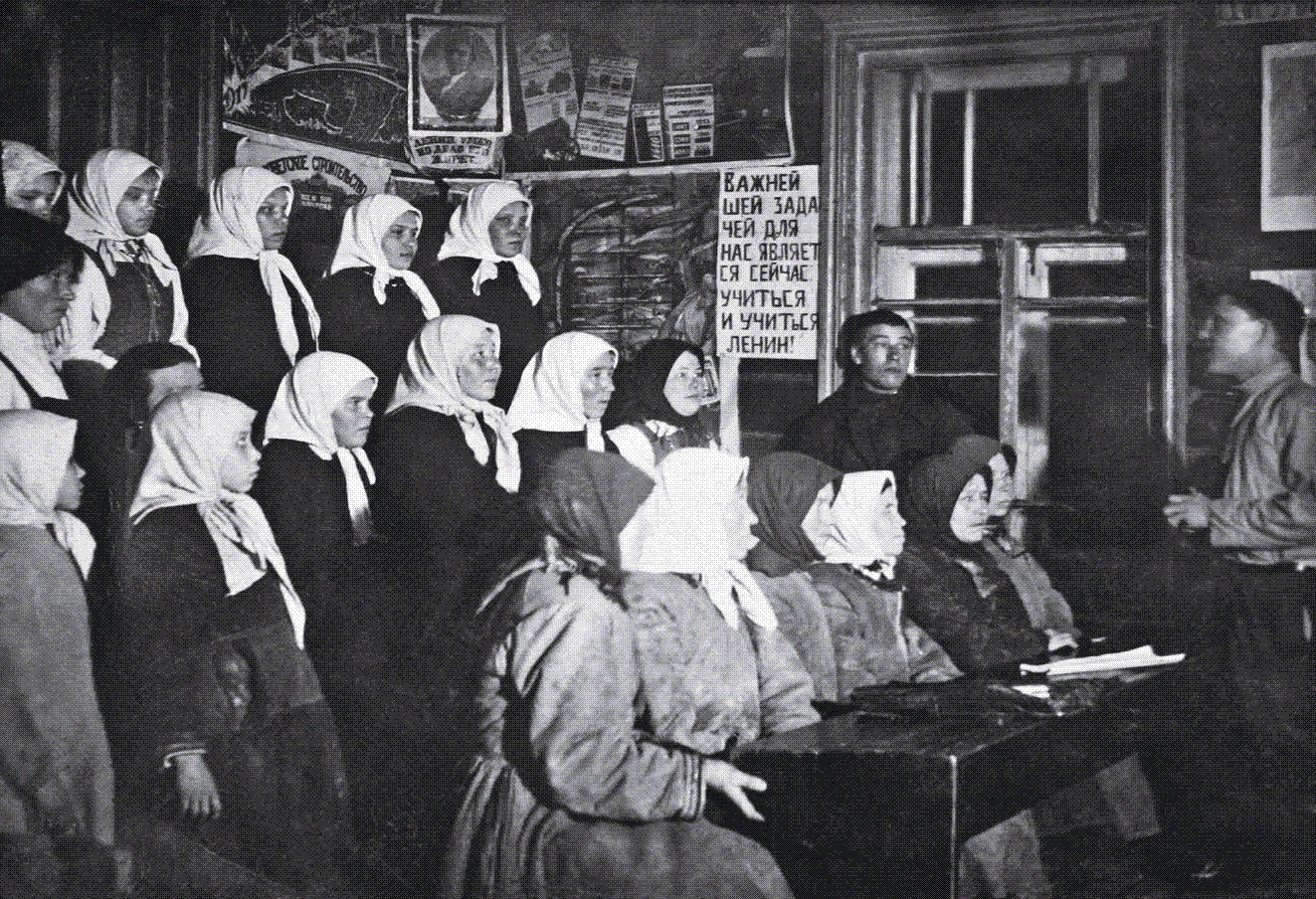
The population learned to read and write. Shorkasy (CASSR), 1930s.

When the Bolshevik Party came to power in 1917, they faced a crumbling empire infamous for its perceived backwardness and poor education system. In 1917, within the remaining Tsarist territories, an estimated 37.9% of the male population above seven years old was literate and only 12.5% of the female population was literate. Lenin's views on literacy were rooted in its economic and political benefits. "Without literacy," he declared, "There can be no politics, there can only be rumors, gossip and prejudice." The likbez campaign was started on December 26, 1919, when Vladimir Lenin signed the decree of the Soviet government "On Eradication of Illiteracy Among the Population of the RSFSR" ("О ликвидации безграмотности среди населения РСФСР"). According to this decree, all people aged 8 to 50 were required to become literate in their native language. 40,000 likbez stations (ликпункты) were set up as centers for education and achieving literacy.

Fighting for time and funding during the ensuing Russian Civil War of 1917–23, Narkompros, the Soviet Ministry of Education, quickly assembled the VeCheKa Likbez (Всероссийская чрезвычайная комиссия по ликвидации безграмотности (ВЧКл/б), the All-Russia Extraordinary Commission for the Liquidation of Illiteracy) which was to be responsible for the training of literacy teachers as well as organizing and propagating the literacy campaign. From the peasantry to trade unions, specific literacy percentage quotas were set for different sectors of Soviet society. For example, the trade union campaign aimed for 100% literacy for its workers by 1923. The Bolsheviks also believed that through literary campaigns they could easily promote Party ideology and shape the population's outlook. Women, given their low literacy rate, were regarded as having the highest potential for becoming the "modernizers" of Soviet society. Through the education of peasant women, the Bolsheviks hoped to break down the patriarchal domination of rural society. Lenin had written in The Emancipation of Women that a woman's illiteracy would impair the "fighting spirit" of male party members and prevent wives from grasping their husbands' ideals. In the Azerbaijan Soviet Socialist Republic, the women's literacy campaign was largely carried out by members of the Ali Bayramov Club, a women's organization founded by Azeri Bolshevik women in Baku in 1920.

To further extend their reach to the peasant community, the Bolsheviks built reading rooms in villages across the country. Serving as a propaganda center rather than library, a literate peasant would act as the room's "red reader" and lead discussions on texts sent by the Party directive with members of the local community. Attendance was most often mandatory, as the reading rooms proved to be one of the Party's most successful propaganda tools, where campaigns would take shape and the locals would hear about happenings in the outside world.

By 1923, however, it was clear that the campaign had its shortcomings. For one thing, Narkompros was having difficulty competing for funding from the Politburo. The Narkompros budget for literacy education dropped from 2.8% in 1924–5 to 1.6% in 1927–8. Likbez literary schools were not established locally by order of Party elites—instead, they relied heavily on grassroots demand. Narkompros also found it hard to find educated teachers actually willing to live in the isolated conditions of the countryside.

In many cases, peasant and proletarian students met their educators and literacy teachers with hostility due to their "petty bourgeois" backgrounds. To solve this problem, local governments established a system of rewards for workers who attended class, granting special privileges to those who did. In some extreme cases, during the 1922 famine, many districts required their illiterate male and female populations to attend literacy school in order to earn their food points. Fearing they were not reaching out to the population and making the popular reading frenzy that they had hoped, the Politburo decided to heavily fund and promote clubs and societies such as the Down with Illiteracy society.

== History ==
=== Early spread ===
Pro-literacy propaganda came into popular Soviet culture with the government's policy of likbez rooted in the Bolshevik push for mass literacy directly following the Bolshevik rise to power. After the 1917 Bolshevik Revolution, Anatoly Lunachersky, the Soviet People's Commissariat for Education made a conscious effort to introduce political propaganda into Soviet schools, particularly the labour schools that had been established in 1918 under the Statute on the Uniform Labour School. These propaganda pamphlets, required texts, and posters artistically embodied the core values of the Soviet push for literacy in both rural and urban settings, namely the concept espoused by Lenin that "Without literacy, there can be no politics, there can only be rumors, gossip and prejudice." This concept, the Soviet valuing of literacy, was later echoed in works like Trotsky's 1924 Literature and Revolution, in which Trotsky describes literature and reading as driving forces in the forging of a New Soviet Man.

In the early years of the Likbez campaign, the State compulsorily enrolled millions of illiterate Soviets from both town and country in literacy schools, requiring these citizens to engage with the Leninist ideology of pro-literacy. In this period, Komsomol members and Young Pioneer detachments were also commissioned to spread pro-literacy propaganda in the form of pamphlets and word of mouth to village illiterates. Initial pro-literacy propaganda efforts included instituting spaces in villages, particularly, that would facilitate the spread of literacy through the countryside. For example, in the early 1920s, Bolsheviks built "Red Rooms," reading rooms in villages across Russia, to serve as propaganda centers by which texts sent by the Party were disseminated to local communities. In children's education, particularly, inoculation of illiteracy was presented by the State as a means by which children could most fully develop desirable qualities such as curiosity and patience. For children, the most widely used books in the early Likbez campaign to promote literacy were the Bible, Kniga Svyashchennogo Chtenia (Book of Holy Reading), Detsky Mir (Children's World) and Rodnoe Slovo (Native Word) by Konstantin D. Ushinsky. God and divine will were a common pro-literacy motif in propaganda throughout the Likbez campaign, but were especially present in its pre-1920 phase.

=== 1920–1930 ===
In the early 1920s, the Bolshevik government emphasized local initiatives and de-emphasized centralized State control to parallel Lenin's New Economic Policy that had been instituted in 1921. It was in this atmosphere that the Soviet government's Commissariat of Enlightenment most heavily launched its methodical literacy campaign by the Spring of 1923. The height of the Russian Soviet Federated Socialist Republic's (RSFR) People's Commissariat of Enlightenment (Narkompros) literacy campaign lasted until the tenth anniversary of the October Revolution, 7 November 1927.

From 1923 to 1927, Soviet pro-literacy propaganda became especially pushed by the Cheka's likbez agencies among Russian Trade Unions. In the pro-literacy propaganda campaigns within trade Unions, the Party-line contained in pamphlets and other pieces of propaganda focused on "true literacy" as the ideal literacy level for workers, a commitment that would require 6–8 months of additional enrollment in Union-sponsored literacy schools after a worker had initially achieved "semi literacy." In the mid-1920s, Cheka likbez commissions would routinely seek and publish reports of literacy rates from Unions as a means of spreading a competitive desire for literacy between towns and factories. In these reports, illiteracy was painted as a "weak opponent" to be overcome in a short period of time by reading State literature in libraries and "Red Rooms" or red corners. The Russian Transport Union, with its educational administration's 40-50 million ruble annual spending capacity, was largely in charge of seeing to the promulgation of literacy initiatives, transmission of pro-literacy pamphlets, and dissemination of books and reading materials to Union-sponsored schools.

Throughout the 1920s, spreading literacy in the Soviet transportation sector through the building of Union schools held symbolic importance for the State as a means of propaganda in and of itself. By promoting literacy in transport workers, specifically, the Komsomol and Cheka likbez units hoped to achieve symbolic victories in signaling the Likbez campaign's overall success. Even in the early Likbez campaign, the transportation sector already experienced relatively low illiteracy rates in workers due to the reading necessary to operate modes of transportation. As such, achieving high literacy in this population was a relatively easy goal and would show the Likbez campaign's success in a widespread and visible industry.

State-sponsored prescriptive materials in the 1920s concerning the plight of the domestic worker had a specific focus on literacy stemming from Union membership. These short stories, chastushki, poems, cartoons, and plays were spread through pamphlets, journals, and wall newspapers and were usually tales about young, single, illiterate women from the countryside. In these pieces of propaganda, it was when the downtrodden women became acquainted with local Soviet officials that the women's luck began to change. In the plot lines of most of these works, the main characters, who had usually fled their countryside homes after being taken advantage of sexually, experienced reversals of fortunes after meeting Soviet officials in their new, urban homes. These officials would rescue the women from the abuses they were suffering as ill-paid and ill-respected domestic servants by encouraging the women to join a Union. At this point in the story, the women would receive not only Union protection but also an education as a result of Union membership and access to Union schools and reading materials. Ultimately, the story's heroine, the domestic worker, would become fully literate as well as active in her local worker's committee (mestkom). Often, the women in these works of pro-literacy propaganda were portrayed as using their new literacy and subsequent heightened foothold in Union society to become Soviet delegates themselves and help second generations of downtrodden women by teaching them to read and write. In these rags to riches propaganda tales, literacy was the vehicle by which women were able to lift up their status as workers within Unions and Soviet society. In 1924, 90% of domestic workers coming from villages were illiterate and were referred to in Soviet literature and propaganda as the "third front," a subset of the population which needed to be raised up through literacy. The focus on spreading the desire for literacy among trade unions through pamphlets, building of schools, and the dissemination of state-approved literature largely petered out by 1925 when Cheka likbez realized it could not achieve its high literary goals by 1933, the date of the Narkompros deadline for compulsory secondary education throughout the Soviet Union. After 1925, greater flexibility in literacy class structures and attendance within Soviet trade unions was gradually introduced.

In the mid-1920s, posters had become a "quintessential form of propaganda" in likbez. Throughout the 1920s, though pro-literacy propaganda was still taking on its earlier forms, it was increasingly contained in propaganda posters.

=== 1930–1936 ===
As Stalin consolidated his power through the late 1920s, Soviet propaganda largely shifted its focus to center on rapid industrialization and centralized, State control of the economy. By the 1930s, the dissemination of pro-literacy propaganda had slowed throughout the Soviet Union. The bodies for promoting literacy whose establishment Likbez had catalyzed throughout the Soviet Union remained in place, but the push for pro-literacy propaganda was not occurring with the same fervor as it had in the previous decade. Indeed, throughout the 1930s, propaganda became increasingly focused on glorifying the Soviet State, particularly its leader Joseph Stalin.

== Pro-literacy posters ==
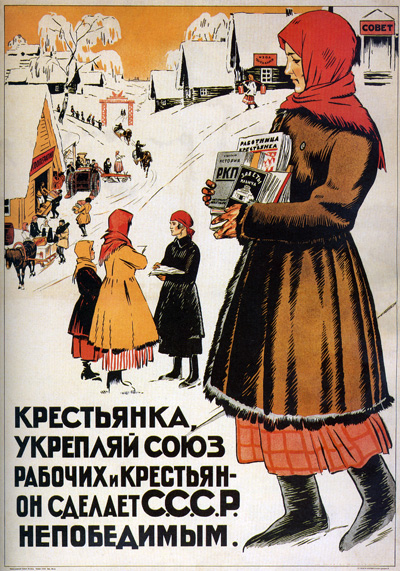
1925 propaganda poster: "Peasant woman, consolidate the unity of workers and peasants."

Pro-literacy propaganda posters were a cheap way for the State Publishing House in Leningrad and other Soviet State bodies to reach a wide audience. Moreover, posters could be understood even by illiterate citizens. Propaganda posters had been an important weapon for the Bolsheviks during the Civil War 1918–1921, but they remained in use even after the war's conclusion. After the Civil War and Lenin's institution of the NEP Policy, propaganda posters began increasingly depicting the reforging of Soviet everyday life or byt.

Propaganda posters of the 1920s focused on the need to build a new world and way of life after the destruction of the Civil War. While the Bolsheviks were experienced in the use of print media to spread ideas, they recognized that print media could not work to imprint Soviet ideology on the USSR as a whole, since most Soviets were illiterate and could not even understand Soviet staple texts such as those of Marx or Lenin.

Due to the prevalence of religion in mass Russian pre-revolutionary culture, Soviet citizens were used to looking at religious icons and learning from the images and symbolism that they saw. Much like the Orthodox Church had done with icons, the Soviet State used propaganda posters to "present symbols in a simple and easily identifiable way, even to barely literate peasants". Pro-literacy propaganda posters sold Communist ideology to the population by portraying the benefits of literacy to individuals, specifically. In the early years of the Soviet Union, particularly in the early-mid 1920s, propaganda posters were used to spread literacy while at the same time indoctrinating the masses in Marxist–Leninist thought.

== Women and pro-literacy propaganda ==
Women, particularly, became motifs in Soviet pro-literacy propaganda. In pro-literacy propaganda, the Bolshevik commitment to female literacy was used to underscore the party's commitment to improving women's station in Soviet society. Zhenotdel, the Russian Soviet Party's women's section, was a particular force in disseminating pro-literacy pamphlets and posters during the height of the Likbez campaign.

The use of women as main characters was a key element of Likbez-era propaganda literature. The plot line of women improving their stations in Soviet society through literacy was first introduced in the widely disseminated rags-to-riches tales of domestic workers in the early 1920s. For example, on the occasion of the fifth anniversary of the Russian decree on literacy (December 1924), the State commissioning body of Ivanovo-Voznesensk (the guberniia) published a pamphlet which linked women's lag in reaching full equality to their husbands with women's ignorance and illiteracy. By achieving literacy, the pamphlet's main character Riabnkova is able to gain autonomy and escape the clutches of her overbearing husband to become a contributing member of Soviet society.

Moreover, images of women became central to Soviet pro-literacy propaganda posters during the Likbez campaign. In these posters, women were shown distributing books, teaching children how to read, and generally engaging with the Soviet ideals of education and literacy. Prior to 1920, women's representation in political posters was mostly allegorical. It was not until 1920 that Soviet artists generated a female counterpart for the commonly used imagery of the male worker or blacksmith that had come into widespread use in post-Civil War propaganda. After 1920, the imagery of women in propaganda posters began to shift to that of the woman worker, a new Soviet woman. Though some allegorical representations of women subsisted in propaganda posters and art through the early 1920s, the new depictions of women found in Likbez-era posters were of women in plain dress, "industrious women workers and peasant women, building socialism alongside their male counterparts." Throughout the Likbez campaign, the building of socialism in which women were depicted as taking part was the spread of literacy. Though representation of the woman worker waned in its prevalence in political propaganda during the NEP-era, the representation of women and books remained a mainstay in pro-literacy Likbez-era propaganda through the 1920s and into the 1930s.

Women, given their low literacy rate, were regarded by the State as having the highest potential for becoming the "modernizers" of Soviet society. Reports of success in the education and literacy of women, the largest demographic group in the illiterate segment of Soviet society, were used as propaganda in reports by the Soviet State as symbols of the State's power to improve the lot of even the most vulnerable and needy of its society.

== Results ==
With the October 1917 Revolution, governmental standards regarding what was considered "literate" also changed. Although all army personnel in the Russian Empire eligible for conscription were required to be functionally literate, most men who could simply read the alphabet and their own name were deemed as fully literate. Although census takers were given rather strict orders on what was deemed fully literate and even semi-literate, in remote provinces and parts of Central Asia standards were somewhat laxer than in locations with a closer proximity to Moscow.

In 1926, however, only 51% of the population over the age of 10 had achieved literacy. Male literacy was at 66.5 while female literacy lagged behind at 37.2. By 1939, however, male literacy was at 90.8 and female literacy had increased to 72.5%. According to the 1939 Soviet Census, literate people were 89.7% (RSFSR, ages 9–49). During the 1950s, the Soviet Union had become a country of nearly 100% literacy.

== Campaign for non-Russian speakers ==
In non-Russian speaking areas of the Soviet population, Narkompros promoted the policy of Korenizatsiya (reliance on indigenous population) within the separate autonomous regions and republics to the extent that teaching Russian was considered a counter-revolutionary crime. For the separate nationalities, the ABCD Hierarchy, a system which ranked the 120 languages of the Soviet Union according their communicable significance, charted out a specific plan for each nationality's achievement of literacy. In 1924 textbooks were printed in only 25 languages of the Soviet Union. However, by 1934 they were printed in 104 languages.

== See also ==
- Cultural Revolution (USSR)
- Education in the Soviet Union
