= Alexander Davidenko =

Soviet composer

- Александр Давиденко
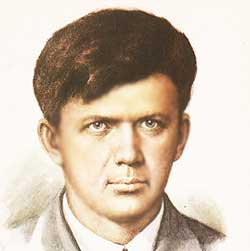
- Born: 13 March 1899; Odessa, Kherson Governorate, Russian Empire
- Died: 1 June 1934 (aged 35); Moscow, Soviet Union
- Occupation: Composer

Alexander Alexandrovich Davidenko (Russian: Александр Александрович Давиденко; 13 April 1899 – 1 May 1934) was a Soviet composer.

== Biography ==
Born into the family of a telegraph operator, his father died when he was 8 years old. He was sent by his stepfather to a church seminary as a child from where he escaped later and started an independent life. In 1918-19 he studied at the Odessa Conservatory under Witold Maliszewski and made his first attempts at composition. In 1919 he took part in the Russian Civil War as a Red Army soldier. In 1921 he studied at the Kharkov Music Institute, then until 1929 at the Moscow Conservatory under Reinhold Glière. He also studied under Alexander Kastalski at both the conservatory and the Moscow Synodal Academy. After completing his studies, he was an aspirant at the Moscow Conservatory from 1929 to 1932.

In 1923, Davidenko worked as a music educator in an orphanage for homeless children. From 1924 he worked regularly with various workers' choirs, including the Nogin Choir since 1930. In 1925, Davidenko took part in an expedition to Chechnya, where he recorded about 100 songs and dances; He arranged 30 of them for piano (1926) and also used this material later. In 1925 he set to music the poem On the Back of Tired Horses Red Regiment by Nikolai Aseev, which achieved a certain level of popularity.

In 1925, Davidenko and other students founded the Production Collective of Students of the Moscow Conservatory (PROKOLL), which he directed with Viktor Bely and Boris Shekhter until 1929. The group also included young composers such as Aram Khachaturian and Dmitry Kabalevsky. In 1927, as a collective of composers, they produced the music for the stage play The Path of October. Davidenko and other core leaders of the PROKOLL became members of the Russian Association of Proletarian Musicians (RAPM) in 1929, where he edited the magazine For Proletarian Music until 1932.

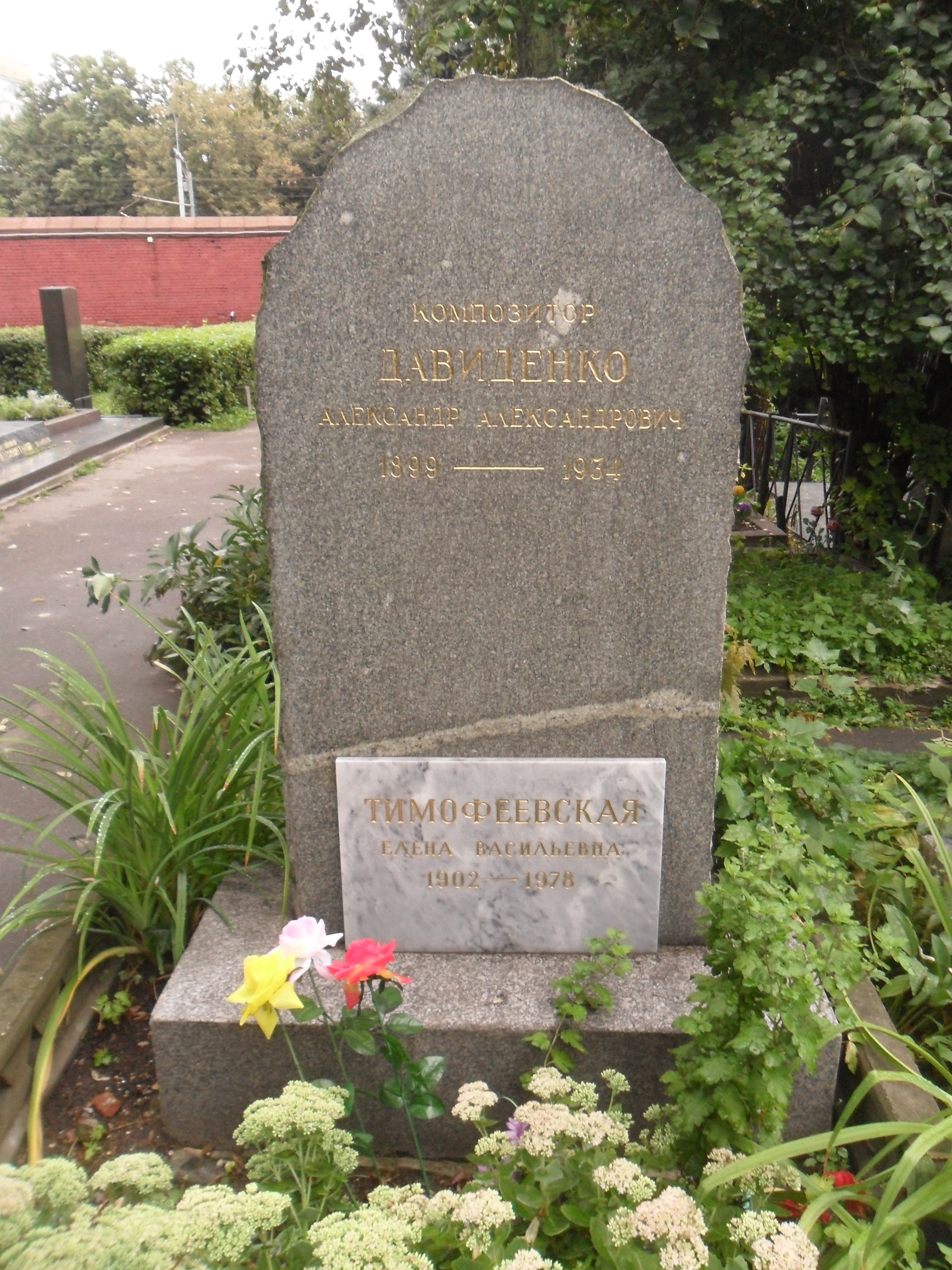
Grave of Alexander Davidenko at the Novodevichy Cemetery

Davidenko died unexpectedly, immediately after the May Day demonstration, in which he took an active part. At his funeral, a choir of students from the Moscow Conservatory and amateur performance participants performed his songs. He was buried at the Novodevichy Cemetery. A memorial plaque was erected for Davidenko on Arbat Street, building 51, where the composer lived.
