= Op. 82 =

In music, Op. 82 stands for Opus number 82. Compositions that are assigned this number include:

- Brahms – Nänie
- Britten – Children's Crusade
- Elgar – Violin Sonata
- Glazunov – Violin Concerto
- Glière – Concerto for Coloratura Soprano
- Prokofiev – Piano Sonata No. 6
- Reicha – 24 Horn Trios
- Schumann – Waldszenen
- Sibelius – Symphony No. 5 in E-flat major (1915, revised 1916 and 1919)
- Strauss – Daphne
