= Marie-Luise Neunecker =

German horn player and professor

Marie Luise Neunecker
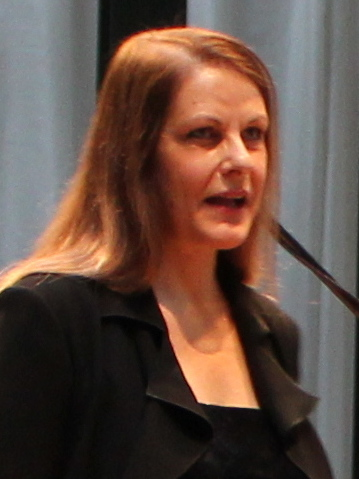
- Neunecker in 2011
- Born: 17 July 1955 (age 71); Erbes-Büdesheim
- Education: Hochschule für Musik Köln
- Occupations: Hornist; Academic teacher
- Organizations: Frankfurt Academy of Music and Performing Arts, Hochschule für Musik "Hanns Eisler"

Marie Luise Neunecker (born 17 July 1955) is a German horn player and professor at the Hochschule für Musik "Hanns Eisler".

== Professional career ==
Neunecker was born in Erbes-Büdesheim. She studied musicology and German studies. She completed her horn studies with Erich Penzel at the Hochschule für Musik Köln. In 1978 she started her career at the Opern- und Schauspielhaus Frankfurt as second horn. In 1979 she was appointed principal horn with the Bamberg Symphony, and from 1981 to 1989 she held the same position with the hr-Sinfonieorchester. She has appeared as a soloist with various orchestras worldwide, and is also active as a chamber music player.

In 1986 she won first prize at the Concert Artists Guild international competition in New York.

In 1988 she was appointed professor at the Frankfurt Academy of Music and Performing Arts, and in 2004 she was appointed professor of horn at the Hochschule für Musik "Hanns Eisler".

Volker David Kirchner dedicated his Orfeo for baritone, horn and piano on poems from Rilke's Sonnets to Orpheus to her, premiered on 6 May 1988 in Karlsruhe with Hermann Becht and Nina Tichman.

György Ligeti dedicated to her his Hamburg Concerto, which she premiered on 20 January 2001 in Hamburg with the Asko Ensemble. She also recorded the work for Teldec's Ligeti Project series.

Recordings include works by Britten, Hindemith, Mozart and Richard Strauss and also lesser known repertory, such as horn concertos by Reinhold Glière, Paul Hindemith, Othmar Schoeck, and Vissarion Shebalin; three works for horn and piano by Alexander Glazunov; Poème by Charles Koechlin; and the concerto for violin, horn and orchestra by Ethel Smyth.

She has served on the jury of The Aeolus International Competition for Wind Instruments.

== Discography ==
=== Concertante works ===
Year	Composer	Work	Conductor Orchestra	Format: Record label Catalogue number
?	W.A. Mozart	Horn Concertos 1–4	Thomas Füri; Camerata Bern	Audio CD: Novalis; Cat: 150 030-0
1993	Paul Hindemith	Horn Concerto	Werner Andreas Albert; Radio-Sinfonie-Orchester Frankfurt	Audio CD: CPO; Cat: 999142-2
1993	Reinhold Glière; Vissarion Shebalin	Horn Concerto, Op. 91; Horn Concertino	Werner Andreas Albert; Bamberg Symphony	Audio CD: Koch/Schwann; Cat: 3-1357-2 H1
1995	Othmar Schoeck; Charles Koechlin; Ethel Smyth	Horn Concerto, Op. 65; Poème for horn and orchestra, Op. 70b Concerto for violin, horn and orchestra	Uri Mayer; NDR Radiophilharmonie	Audio CD: Koch/Schwann; Cat: 3-6412-2 H1
1995	Max Reger	Scherzino for horn and orchestra	Horst Stein; Bamberg Symphony	Audio CD: Koch/Schwann; Cat: 3-1489-2 H1
1999	Richard Strauss; Benjamin Britten	Horn Concertos 1–2; Serenade for Tenor, Horn and Strings	Ingo Metzmacher; Bamberg Symphony	Audio CD: EMI Classics; Cat: 72435 56183-2
2002	György Ligeti	Hamburg Concerto	Reinbert de Leeuw; Asko Ensemble	Audio CD: Teldec; Cat: 8573 88263-2

=== Chamber music ===
Year	Composer	Work	Ensemble	Format: Record label Catalogue number
?	W.A. Mozart	Quintet for horn and strings, KV 407	Mannheimer String Quartet	Audio CD: Novalis; Cat: 150 006-2
1993	Alexander Glazunov	Reverie, Serenade, Idyll for horn and piano	Paul Rivinius (piano)	Audio CD: Koch/Schwann; Cat: 3-1357-2 H1
1996	György Ligeti	Trio for violin, horn and piano	Saschko Gawriloff (violin); Pierre-Laurent Aimard (piano)	Audio CD: Sony Classical; Cat: SK62309
1996	Johannes Brahms	Trio for piano, violin and horn in E Flat, Op.40	Frank Peter Zimmermann (violin); Wolfgang Sawallisch (piano)	Audio CD: EMI Classics; Cat: CDC556385

- Neunecker, Marie Luise; Weithaas, Antje; Avenhaus, Silke; Brahms, Johannes; Aho, Kalevi; Ligeti, György (2011), Horn trios (in no linguistic content), Åkersberga, Sweden: BIS, OCLC 811642726
