= Education in the Soviet Union =

Overview of education in Soviet Union

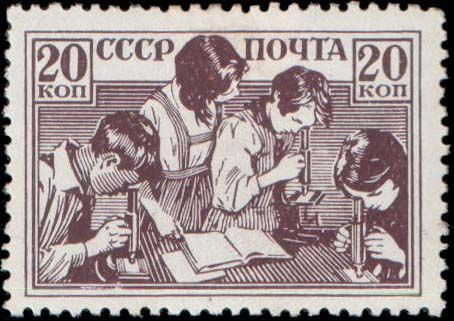
1938 USSR postage stamp depicting children in a biology lesson

Education in the Soviet Union was guaranteed as a constitutional right to all people provided through state schools and universities. The education system that emerged after the establishment of the Soviet Union in 1922 became internationally renowned for its successes in eradicating illiteracy and cultivating a highly educated population. Its advantages were total access for all citizens and post-education employment. The Soviet Union recognized that the foundation of their system depended upon an educated population and development in the broad fields of engineering, the natural sciences, the life sciences and social sciences, along with basic education.

== History ==
In Imperial Russia, according to the 1897 Population Census, literate people made up 28.4 percent of the population. A mere 13% of women were literate.

In the first year after the 1917 Bolshevik revolution, the schools were left very much to their own devices due to the ongoing civil war of 1917–1923. The People's Commissariat for Education directed its attention solely towards introducing political propaganda into the schools and forbidding religious teaching. In the autumn of 1918 the Uniform Labor School Regulations were issued for the RSFSR. From October 1, 1918, all types of schools came under Commissariat for Education and were designated by the name "Uniform Labour School". They were divided into two levels: the first for children from 8 to 13, and the second for children from 14 to 17. During the 8th Party Congress in March 1919, the creation of the new socialist system of education was said to be the major aim of the Soviet government. After that, Soviet school policy underwent numerous radical changes.

The period of the First World War (1914–1918), of the Russian Civil War (1917–1923) and of war communism (1918–1921) led to sharp drops in the number of schools and of enrolled students. Whereas in 1914, 91% of the children were receiving instruction in schools, in 1918 figure dropped to 62%, in 1919 to 49% and in 1920 to 24.9%. As a result, illiteracy grew rapidly.

In accordance with the Sovnarkom decree of 26 December 1919, signed by its chairman Vladimir Lenin, the new policy of likbez (Russian: ликвидация безграмотности, romanized: likvidatsiya bezgramotnosti, lit. 'liquidation of illiteracy'), was introduced. A new system of universal compulsory education was established for children. Moreover, millions of illiterate adult people all over the country, including residents of small towns and villages, were enrolled in special literacy schools. Komsomol members and Young Pioneer detachments played an important role in the education of illiterate people in villages. In the Azerbaijan Soviet Socialist Republic, the women's literacy campaign was largely carried out by members of the Ali Bayramov Club, a women's organization founded by Azeri Bolshevik women in Baku in 1920. The most active phase of likbez lasted until 1939. In 1926, the literacy rate was 56.6 percent of the population. By 1937, according to census data, the literacy rate was 86% for men and 65% for women, with a total literacy rate of 75%.

An important aspect of the early campaign for literacy and education was the policy of "indigenisation" (korenizatsiya). This policy, which lasted essentially from the mid-1920s to the late 1930s, promoted the development and use of non-Russian local and regional languages in the government, the media, and education. Intended to counter the historical practices of Russification, it had as another practical goal assuring native-language education as the quickest way to increase educational levels of future generations. A huge network of so-called "national schools" was established by the 1930s, and enrollments continued to grow throughout the Soviet era. Language policy changed over time, perhaps marked first of all in the government's mandating in 1938 the teaching of Russian as a required subject of study in every non-Russian school, and then especially beginning in the latter 1950s in a growing conversion of non-Russian schools to use Russian as the main medium of instruction. However, an important legacy of the native-language and bilingual education policies over the years was the nurturing of widespread literacy in dozens of languages of indigenous nationalities of the USSR, accompanied by widespread and growing bilingualism where Russian was said to be the "language of internationality communication" (Russian: язык межнационального общения).

In 1923, a new school statute and curricula, based on the Dalton plan, were adopted. Schools were divided into three separate types, designated by the number of years of instruction: "four-year", "seven-year" and "nine-year" schools. Seven- and nine-year (secondary) schools were scarce, compared to the "four-year" (primary) schools, making it difficult for the pupils to complete their secondary education. Those who finished seven-year schools had the right to enter Technicums. Only nine-year schooling led directly to university-level education.

The curriculum was changed radically. Independent subjects, such as reading, writing, arithmetic, the mother tongue, foreign languages, history, geography, literature or science were abolished. Instead school programmes were subdivided into "complex themes", such as "the life and labour of the family in village and town" for the first year or "scientific organisation of labour" for the 7th year of education. This system proved a complete failure, however, and in 1928 a new programme completely abandoned the complex themes and resumed instruction in individual subjects.

All students were required to take the same standardised classes. This continued until the 1970s, when older students began being given time to take elective courses of their own choice in addition to the standard courses.

From 1918, all Soviet schools were co-educational. In 1943, urban schools were separated into boys' and girls' schools. In 1954 the mixed-sex education system was restored.

Research and education, in all subjects but especially in the social sciences, was dominated by Marxist-Leninist ideology and supervised by the CPSU. Such domination led to abolition of whole academic disciplines such as genetics. Some scholars were purged as they were proclaimed bourgeois during that period. Most of the abolished branches of learning were rehabilitated later in Soviet history, in the 1960s–1990s (e.g., genetics in October 1964), although many purged scholars were rehabilitated only in post-Soviet times. In addition, many textbooks - such as history ones - were full of ideology and propaganda, and contained factually inaccurate information (see Soviet historiography). The educational system's ideological pressure continued, but in the 1980s, the government's more open policies influenced changes that made the system more flexible . Shortly before the 1991 collapse of the Soviet Union, schools no longer had to teach subjects from the Marxist-Leninist perspective at all.

Another aspect of the inflexibility was the high rate at which pupils were held back and required to repeat a year of schooling. In the early 1950s, typically 8–10% of pupils in elementary grades were held back a year. This was partly attributable to the pedagogical style of teachers, and partly to the fact that many of these children had disabilities that impeded their performance. In the latter 1950s, however, the Ministry of Education began to promote the formation of a wide variety of special schools (or "auxiliary schools") for children with physical or mental handicaps. Once those children were taken out of the mainstream (general) schools, and once teachers began to be held accountable for the repeat-rates of their pupils, the rates fell sharply. By the mid-1960s the repeat-rates in the general primary schools declined to about 2%, and by the late 1970s to less than 1%.

The number of schoolchildren enrolled in special schools grew fivefold between 1960 and 1980. However, the availability of such special schools varied greatly from one republic to another. On a per capita basis, such special schools were most available in the Baltic republics, and least in the Central Asian ones. This difference probably had more to do with the availability of resources than with the relative need for the services by children in the two regions.

In the 1970s and 1980s, approximately 99.7% of Soviet people were literate.

== Classification and terms ==
The Soviet educational system was organized into three levels. The names of these levels were and are still used to rate the education standards of persons or particular schools, despite differences in the exact terminology used by each profession or school. Military, militsiya, KGB and Party schools were also graded according to these levels. This distinguishes the Soviet system from the rest of the world, where educational levels of schools may differ, despite their similar names.

Elementary schools were called the "beginning" level (Russian: начальное, nachalnoye), 4 and later 3 classes. Secondary schools were 7 and later 8 classes (required completing elementary school) and called "incomplete secondary education" (Russian: неполное среднее образование, nepolnoye sredneye obrazavaniye). This level was compulsory for all children (since 1958–1963) and optional for under-educated adults (who could study in so-called "evening schools"). Since 1981, the "complete secondary education" level (10 or, in some republics, 11 years) was compulsory.

10 classes (11 classes in the Baltic republics) of an ordinary school was called "secondary education" (Russian: среднее образование—literally, "middle education").

PTUs, tekhnikums, and some military facilities formed a system of so-called “secondary specialized education” (Russian: среднее специальное, sredneye spetsialnoye). PTU's were vocational schools and trained students in a wide variety of skills ranging from mechanic to hairdresser. Completion of a PTU after primary school did not provide a full secondary diploma or a route to such a diploma. However, entry to a tekhnikum or other specialized secondary school could be started after either 8 or 10 classes of combined education in elementary and secondary school. Graduation from this level was required for the positions of qualified workers, technicians and lower bureaucrats (see also vocational education, professions, training).

“Higher” (Russian: высшее, vyssheye) educational institutions included degree-level facilities: universities, “institutes” and military academies. "Institute" in the sense of a school refers to a specialized "microuniversity" (mostly technical), usually subordinate to the ministry associated with their field of study. The largest network "institutes" were medical, pedagogic (for the training of schoolteachers), construction and various transport (automotive and road, railroad, civil aviation) institutes. Some of those institutes were present in every oblast capital while others were unique and situated in big cities (like the Literature Institute and the Moscow Institute of Physics and Technology ). Colloquially these universities and institutes were all referred to by the acronym "VUZ" (ВУЗ – высшее учебное заведение, "higher educational institution").

There was also a category of secondary schools specialized in advanced teaching of mathematics, physics, chemistry, and foreign languages. Advanced teaching of sciences started in the upper grades, while advanced teaching of languages could start from the first grade.

Students who wanted admission to a VUZ had to have graduated from either a general secondary school (10 or 11 years) or a specialized secondary school or a tekhnikum. Those who completed only vocational school (PTU) or "incomplete secondary school" were not certified as having completed secondary education (they lacked an аттестат зрелости – maturity certificate – or equivalent diploma from a specialized secondary school) and were thus not eligible to attend a VUZ.

Military and militsiya (police) schools (Russian: высшее училище/школа, vyshee uchilische/shkola) were on the same higher level. Note that Soviet military and militsiya facilities named "Academy" (Russian: Академия, Akademiya) were not a degree-level school (like Western military academies such as West Point), but a post-graduate school for experienced officers. Such schools were compulsory for officers applying for the rank of colonel. (see Soviet military academies)

KGB's higher education institutions were called either "schools" (like "Higher School of KGB") or "institutes" (like "Red Banner Institute of KGB" - training specifically intelligence officers).

CPSU's higher education institutions were called "Higher Party Schools" (Russian: Высшая партийная школа, vysshaya partiynaya shkola).

The spirit and structure of Soviet education is mostly inherited by many post-Soviet countries despite formal changes and social transitions.

== See also ==
- Ministry of Education (Soviet Union)
- Education in Kazakhstan
- Education in Russia
- Education in Siberia
- Korenizatsiya
- Likbez
- Professional technical school
- Russification
- Research in the Soviet Union
- Soviet Student Olympiads
- List of Russian scientists

== Bibliography ==
- Bronfenbrenner, Urie. Two worlds of childhood: U.S. and U.S.S.R. New York: Russell Sage Foundation, 1970.
- Sheila Fitzpatrick. 1978. Cultural Revolution in Russia, 1928-1931. Indiana University Press.
- Sheila Fitzpatrick. Education and Social Mobility in the Soviet Union, 1921-1934. Cambridge University Press. 1979
- E. Glyn Lewis. Multilingualism in the Soviet Union: Aspects of Language Policy and Its Implementation. The Hague: Mouton, 1971.
- Spearman, M. L. Scientific and technical training in the Soviet Union, (NASA, Langley Research Center, Hampton, VA), 1983.
- Michael David-Fox and György Péteri. Academia in Upheaval: Origins, Transfers, and Transformations of the Communist Academic Regime in Russia and East Central Europe. 2000
- Ebon, Martin. The Soviet Propaganda Machine. New York: McGraw, 1987. Print.
- Grant, Nigel. Soviet Education. 4th ed. Harmondsworth: Penguin, 1979. Print
- Polansky, Patricia. “Recent Studies of Siberian Books and Reading: A Review Essay.” The Journal of Library History. 22, no. 1 (1987): 58–69.
