= Asko Concerto =

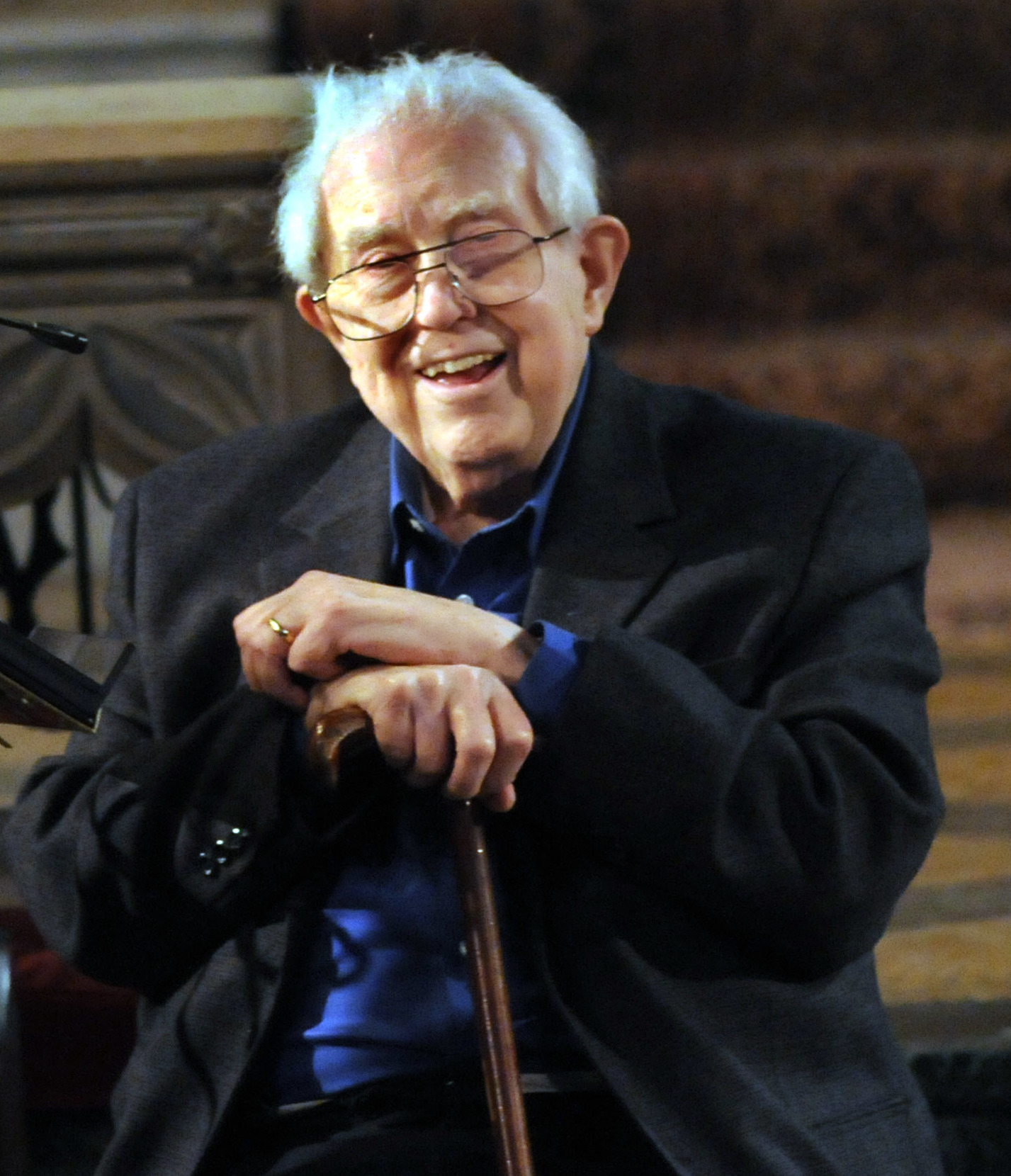
Elliott Carter in 2007

The Asko Concerto is a concerto for chamber orchestra by the American composer Elliott Carter. The work was commissioned by the Dutch chamber group Asko|Schönberg, for which the piece is titled. It was composed in January 2000 and was first performed in Concertgebouw, Amsterdam on April 26, 2000, by the Asko ensemble under the conductor Oliver Knussen. The piece is dedicated to Asko|Schönberg.

== Composition ==
The Asko Concerto has a duration of roughly 12 minutes and is composed in a single movement. Carter briefly described the piece in the score program notes, writing:

My Asko Concerto for sixteen players features each one of them participating in one of the following groups—two trios, two duos, a quintet or a solo. These six sections are framed by the entire group playing together. Although the music is in lighthearted mood, each soloistic section approaches ensemble playing in a different spirit.

=== Instrumentation ===
The work is scored for a chamber orchestra comprising flute (doubling piccolo), oboe, clarinet, bass clarinet, bassoon, French horn, trumpet, trombone, one percussionist, harp, piano (doubling celesta), two violins, viola, cello, and double bass.

== Reception ==
The Asko Concerto has been praised by music critics. Anthony Tommasini of The New York Times wrote:

The concerto, ingeniously scored for 16 instruments, is Mr. Carter's homage to the Baroque concerto grosso. Ritornello sections for the entire ensemble, initiated with slicing chords and driving rhythms, are alternated with flightier episodes for diverse groups of soloists, where, say, the bass clarinet, trombone and cello engage in some every-which-way busyness. It's brilliant but also fun.

Andrew Clements of The Guardian similarly opined, "In the Asko Concerto [... Carter's] instrumental webs move into the spotlight in a series of interlinked short movements in which every proportion is perfect." Arnold Whittall of Gramophone also lauded the piece, writing, "... Carter provides a typically resourceful 12-minute structure in which the 16-strong ensemble is variously subdivided to engage in a succession of trenchant dialogues and mercurial exchanges."
