= Reinhold Glière =

Russian and Soviet composer (1875–1956)

- Рейнгольд Глиэр
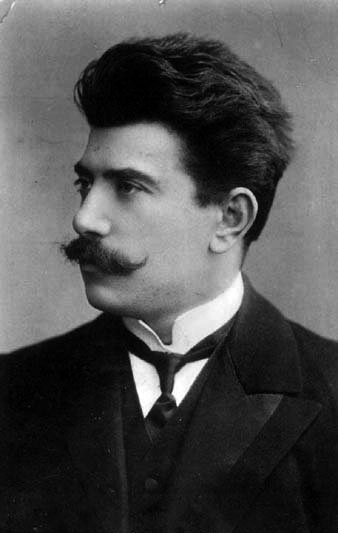
- Glière before 1917
- Born: Reinhold Ernest Glier; 11 January 1875 [O.S. 30 December 1874] Kiev, Russian Empire
- Died: 23 June 1956 (aged 81); Moscow, Soviet Union
- Resting place: Novodevichy Cemetery
- Education: Moscow Conservatory
- Occupations: Composer; teacher

Signature
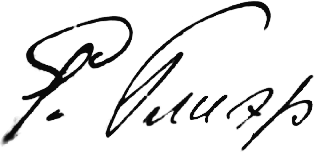

Reinhold Moritzevich Glière (Note: In this name that follows East Slavic naming customs, the patronymic is Moritzevich and the family name is Glière.) (Note: Russian: Рейнгольд Морицевич Глиэр, romanized: Reyngold Moritsevich Glier) (born Reinhold Ernest Glier; (Note: Russian: Рейнгольд Эрнест Глиэр, romanized: Reyngold Ernest Glier) 11 January 1875 [O.S. 30 December 1874] – 23 June 1956) was a Russian and Soviet composer of German and Polish descent. He was awarded the titles of People's Artist of the RSFSR (1935) and People's Artist of the USSR (1938).

== Biography ==
Glière was born in the city of Kiev. He was the second son of the wind instrument maker Ernst Moritz Glier (1834–1896) from Saxony (Klingenthal in the Vogtland region), who emigrated to the Russia and married Józefa (Josephine) Korczak (1849–1935), the daughter of his master, from Warsaw. His original name, as given in his baptism certificate, was Reinhold Ernest Glier. About 1900, he changed the spelling and pronunciation of his surname to Glière, which gave rise to the legend, stated by Leonid Sabaneyev for the first time (1927), of his French or Belgian descent.

He entered the Kiev school of music in 1891, where he was taught violin by Otakar Ševčík, among others. In 1894, Glière entered the Moscow Conservatory where he studied with Sergei Taneyev (counterpoint), Mikhail Ippolitov-Ivanov (composition), and Jan Hřímalý (violin; he dedicated his Octet for Strings, Op. 5, to Hřímalý), Anton Arensky and Georgi Conus (both harmony). He graduated in 1900, having composed a one-act opera Earth and Heaven (after Lord Byron) and received a gold medal in composition. In the following year, Glière accepted a teaching post at the Moscow Gnesin School of Music. Taneyev found two private pupils for him in 1902: Nikolai Myaskovsky and the eleven-year-old Sergei Prokofiev, whom Glière taught on Prokofiev's parental estate Sontsovka. Glière studied conducting with Oskar Fried in Berlin from 1905 to 1908. One of his co-students was Serge Koussevitzky, who conducted the premiere of Glière's Symphony No. 2, Op. 25, on 23 January 1908 in Berlin. Back in Moscow, Glière returned again to the Gnesin School. In the following years Glière composed the symphonic poem Sireny, Op. 33 (1908), the programme symphony Ilya Muromets, Op. 42 (1911) and the ballet-pantomime Chrizis, Op. 65 (1912). In 1913, he gained an appointment to the school of music in Kiev, which was raised to the status of conservatory shortly after, as Kiev Conservatory. A year later he was appointed director. In Kiev, he taught among others Levko Revutsky, Borys Lyatoshynsky and Vladimir Dukelsky (who became well known in the West as Vernon Duke).

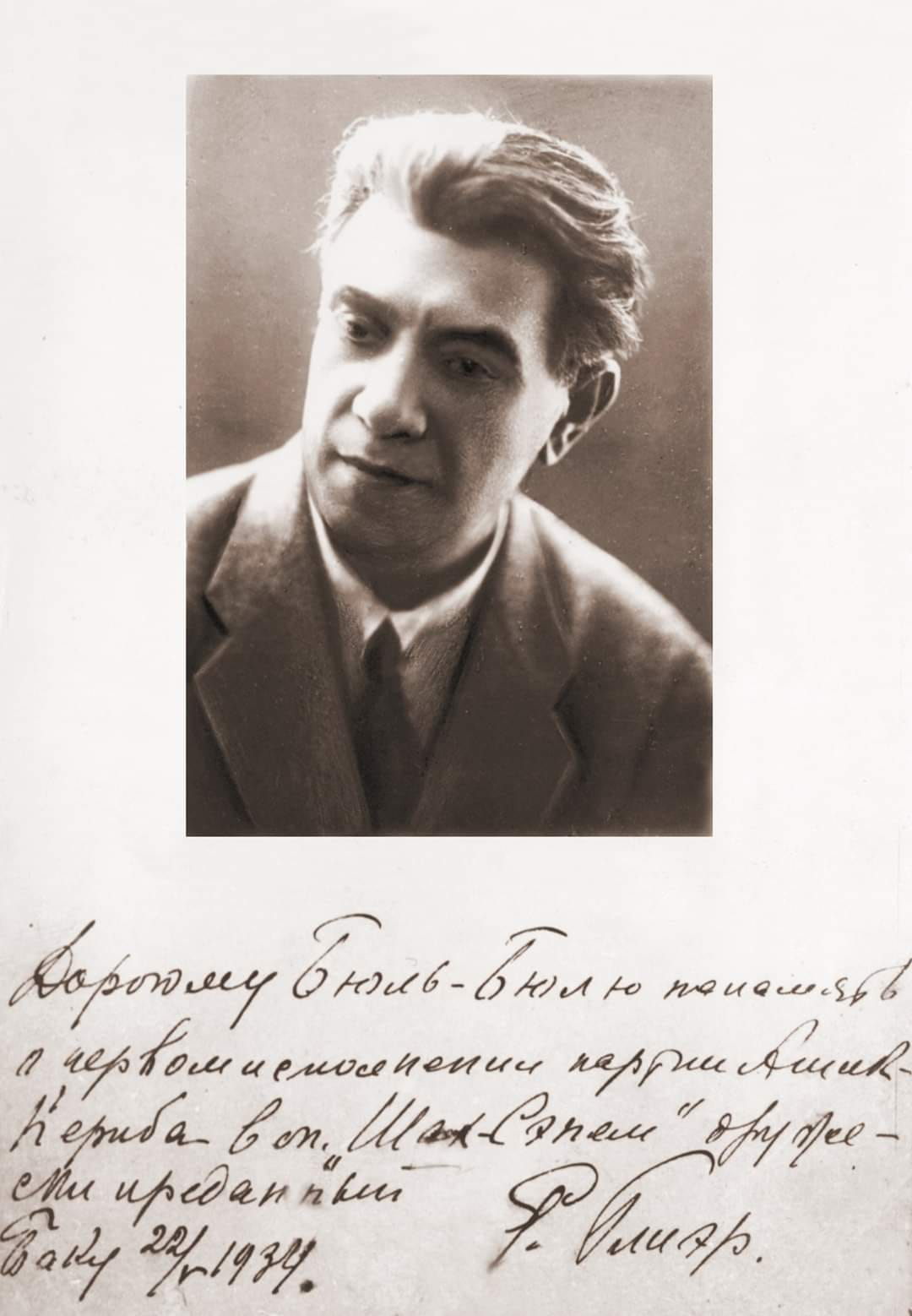
A letter from Glière to the Azerbaijani tenor Bulbul. From the House-Museum of Bulbul in Baku.

In 1920, Glière moved to the Moscow Conservatory where he (intermittently) taught until 1941. Boris Aleksandrov, Aram Khachaturian, Alexander Davidenko, Tamara Popatenko, Lev Knipper and Alexander Mosolov were some of his pupils from the Moscow era. For some years he held positions in the organization Proletkul't and worked with the People's Commissariat for Education. The theatre was in the centre of his work now. In 1923, Glière was invited by the Azerbaijan People's Commissariat of Education to come to Baku and compose the prototype of an Azerbaijani national opera. The result of his ethnographical research was the opera Shakh-Senem, now considered the cornerstone of the Soviet-Azerbaijan national opera tradition. Here the musical legacy of the Russian classics from Glinka to Scriabin is combined with folk song material and some symphonic orientalisms. In 1927, inspired by the ballerina Yekaterina Geltzer (1876–1962), he wrote the music for the ballet Krasny mak (The Red Poppy), later revised, to avoid the connotation of opium, as Krasny tsvetok (The Red Flower, 1955). The Red Poppy was praised "as the first Soviet ballet on a revolutionary subject". This is perhaps his most famous work in Russia as well as abroad. One number from the score, his arrangement of a Russian folk chastushka song Yablochko ("little apple") consists of an introduction, a basso statement of the theme, and a series of increasingly frenetic variations ending with a powerful orchestral climax. It is identified in the ballet score by its almost equally well-known name, the Russian Sailor's Dance. It is probably his best-known single piece, and is still heard at symphony concerts around the world, frequently as an encore. The ballet-pantomime Chrizis was revised just after The Red Poppy, in the late 1920s, followed by the popular ballet Comedians after Lope de Vega (1931, later re-written and renamed The Daughter from Castile).

After 1917 Glière never visited Western Europe, as many other Russian composers did. He gave concerts in Siberia and other remote areas of Russia instead. He was working in Uzbekistan as a "musical development helper" at the end of the 1930s. From this time emerged the "drama with music" Gyulsara and the opera Leyli va Medzhnun, both composed with the Uzbek composer Tolib Sodiqov (1907–1957). From 1938 to 1948 Glière was Chairman of the Organization Committee of the Soviet Composers Association. Before the revolution Glière had already been honoured three times with the Glinka prize. During his last few years he was very often awarded: Azerbaijan (1934), the Russian Soviet Republic (1936), Uzbekistan (1937) and the USSR (1938) appointed him Artist of the People. The title "Doctor of Art Sciences" was awarded to him in 1941. He won first degree Stalin Prizes: in 1946 (Concerto for Voice and Orchestra), 1948 (Fourth String Quartet), and 1950 (The Bronze Horseman).

As Taneyev's pupil and an 'associated' member of the circle around the Petersburg publisher Mitrofan Belyayev, it appeared Glière was destined to be a chamber musician. In 1902 Arensky wrote about the Sextet, Op. 1, "one recognizes Taneyev easily as a model and this does praise Glière". Unlike Taneyev, Glière felt more attracted to the national Russian tradition as he was taught by Rimsky-Korsakov's pupil Ippolitov-Ivanov. Alexander Glazunov even certified an "obtrusively Russian style" to Glière's 1st Symphony. The 3rd Symphony Ilya Muromets was a synthesis between national Russian tradition and impressionistic refinement. The premiere was in Moscow in 1912, and it resulted in the award of the Glinka Prize. The symphony depicts in four tableaux the adventures and death of the Russian hero Ilya Muromets. This work was widely performed, in Russia and abroad, and earned him worldwide renown. It became an item in the extensive repertoire of Leopold Stokowski, who made, with Glière's approval, an abridged version, shortened to around half the length of the original. Today's cult status of Ilya Muromets is based not least on the pure dimensions of the original 80-minute work, but Ilya Muromets demonstrates the high level of Glière's artistry. The work has a comparatively modern tonal language, massive Wagnerian instrumentation and long lyrical lines.

Despite his political engagement after the October Revolution Glière kept out of the ideological ditch war between the Association for Contemporary Music (ASM) and the Russian Association of Proletarian Musicians (RAPM) during the late 1920s. Glière concentrated primarily on composing monumental operas, ballets, and cantatas. His symphonic idiom, which combined broad Slavonic epics with cantabile lyricism, is governed by rich, colourful harmony, bright and well-balanced orchestral colours and perfect traditional forms. Obviously this secured his acceptance by Tsarist and Soviet authorities, at the same time creating resentment from many composers who suffered intensely under the Soviet regime. As the last genuine representative of the pre-revolutionary national Russian school, i.e. a 'living classic', Glière was immune to the standard reproach of "formalism" (mostly equivalent to "modernity" or "bourgeois decadence"). Thus the infamous events of 1936 and 1948 passed Glière by.

Gliere wrote concerti for harp (Op. 74, 1938), coloratura soprano (Op. 82, 1943), cello (Op. 87, 1946, dedicated to Sviatoslav Knushevitsky), horn (Op. 91, 1951, dedicated to Valery Polekh), and violin (Op. 100, 1956, unfinished, completed by Borys Lyatoshynsky). Nearly unexplored are Glière's educational compositions, his chamber works, piano pieces and songs from his time at the Moscow Gnesin School of Music.

He died in Moscow on 23 June 1956.

== Gallery ==
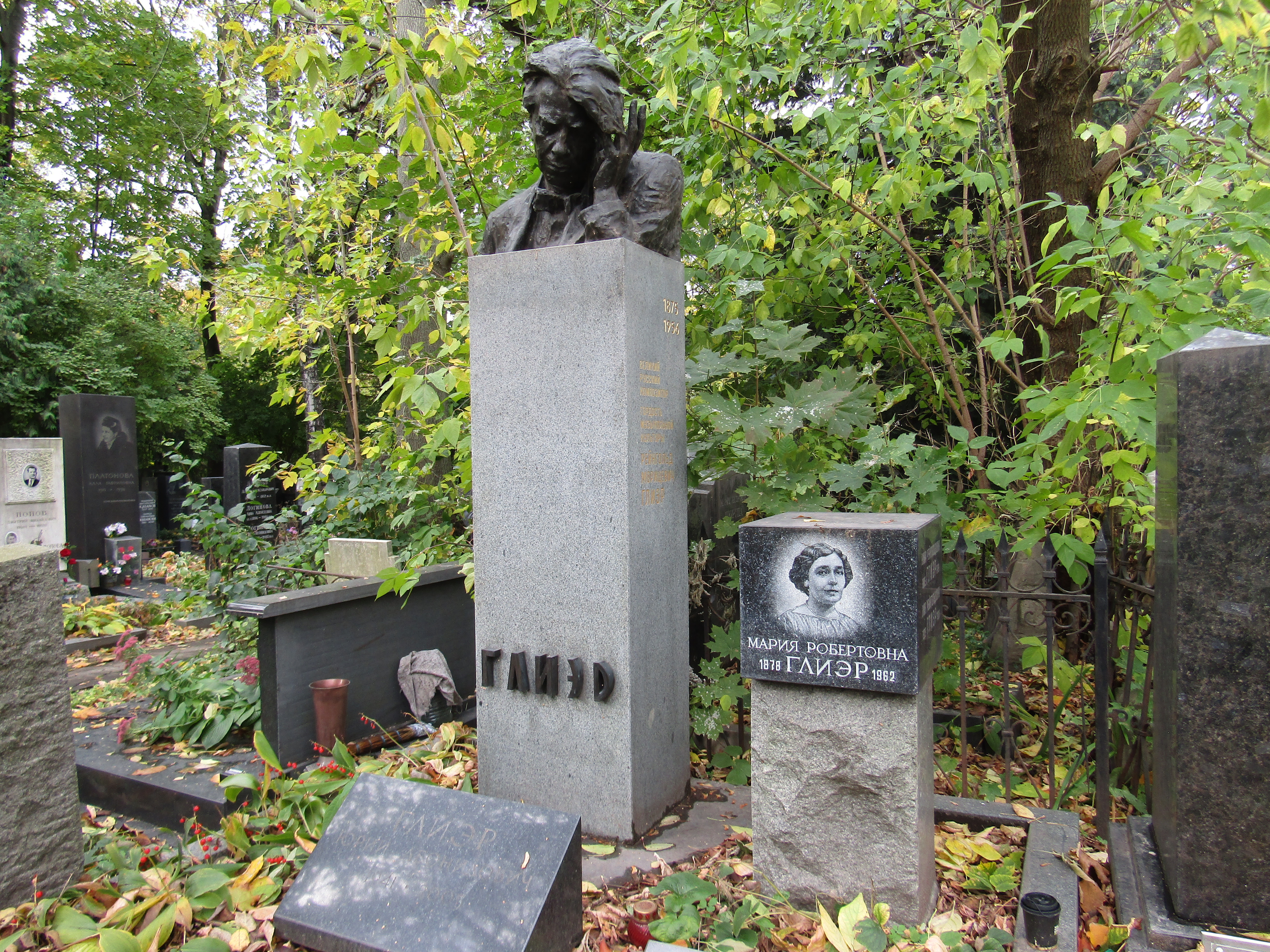
Glière's grave in Novodevichy Cemetery in Moscow

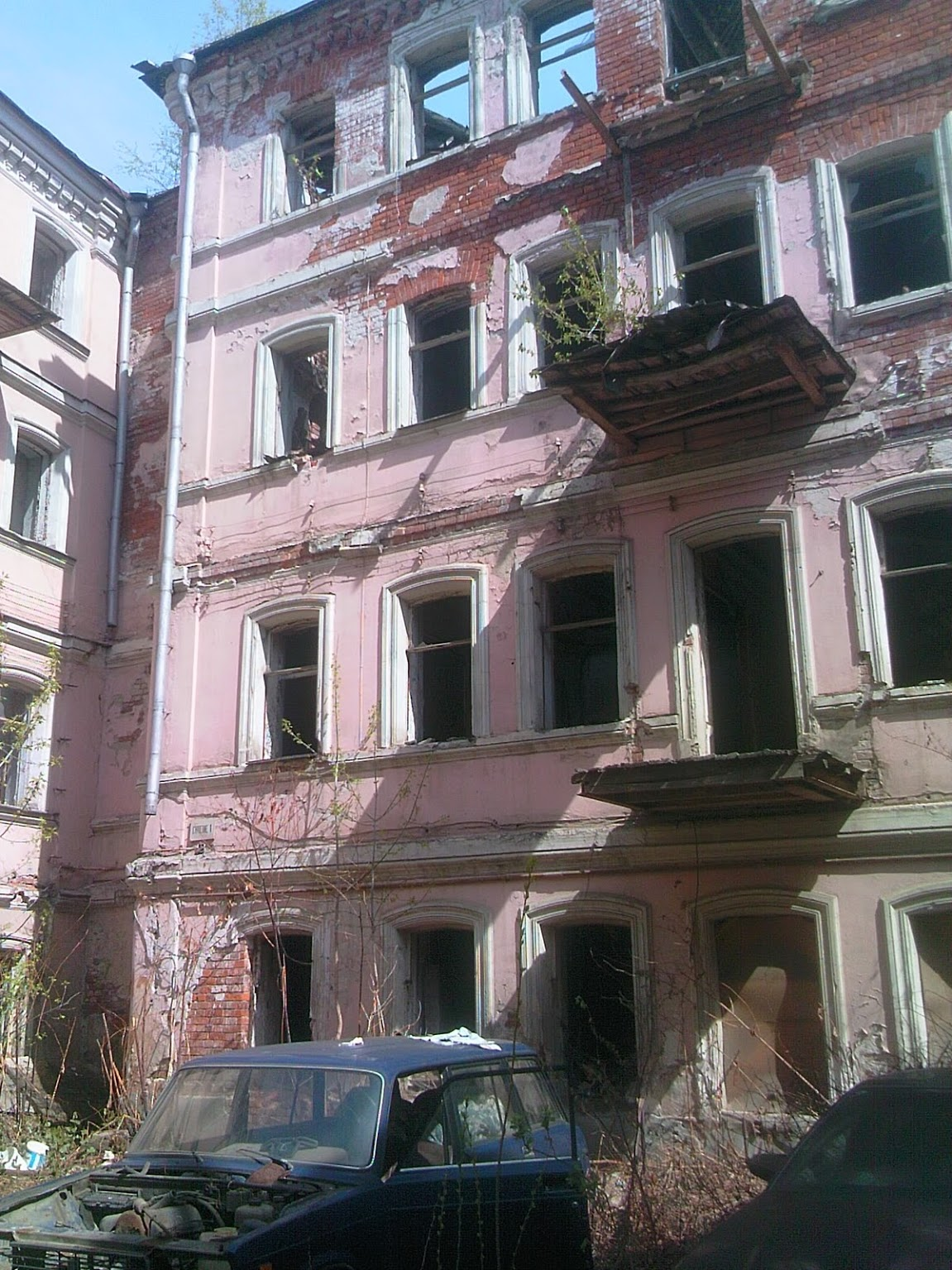
The courtyard of the former Glière house on Petrovsky Boulevard in Moscow

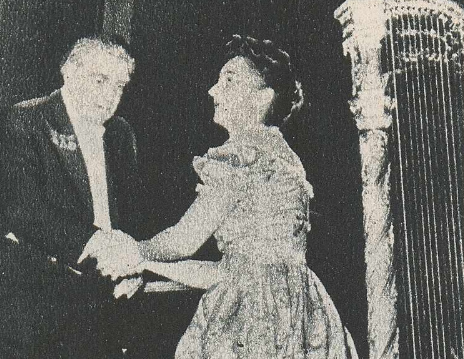
Glière with the Italian-Romanian harpist Liana Pasquali in 1954

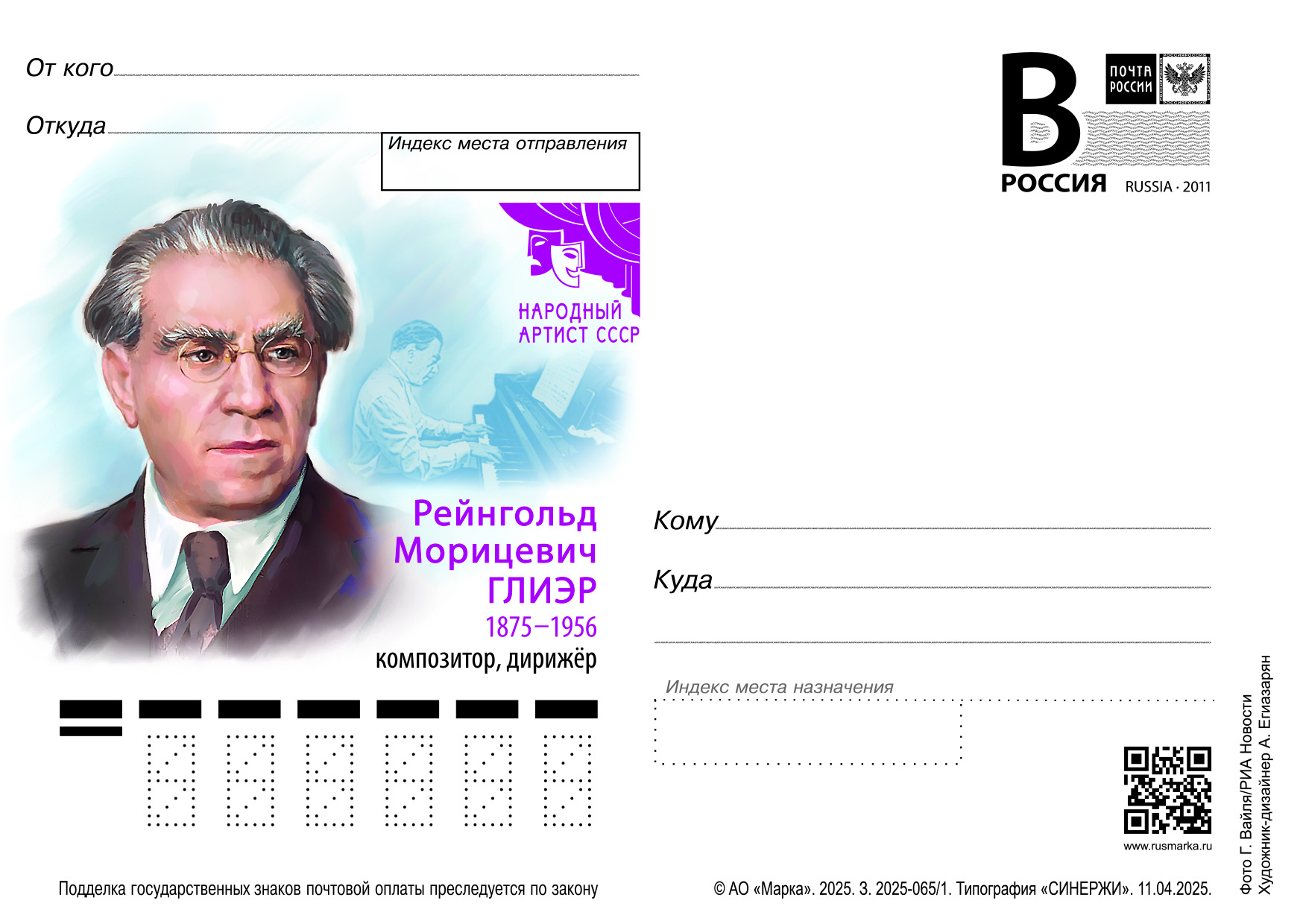
A commemorative postcard honoring Glière as a People's Artist of the USSR

== Honours and awards ==
- Three Glinka Awards (not Glinka Prizes)

1905 – for the first sextet (nominated by Glazunov, Liadov, Balakirev)
1912 – for his symphonic poem "Siren"
1914 – for Third Symphony ("Ilya of Murom")

- 1937 – Order of the Red Banner of Labour – a musical drama "Gyulsary"
- 1938 – Order of the Badge of Honour
- Three Orders of Lenin

1945 – "for outstanding achievements in the field of music and to honor the 70th anniversary of"
1950 – "for outstanding achievements in the field of music and to honor the 75th anniversary of"
1955 – "for outstanding achievements in the field of music and to honor the 80th anniversary of"

- Three Stalin Prizes first degree

1946 – a concerto for coloratura soprano and orchestra
1948 – for the Fourth String Quartet.
1950 – for the ballet "The Bronze Horseman" (1949)

- Twice Honored Artist of the RSFSR (1925 and 1927)
- People's Artiste of the Azerbaijan SSR (1934) – for "special services to workers and the development of the new Turkic musical culture," for his years of work on the creation of the opera "Shahsanam")
- People's Artist of RSFSR (1935)
- People's Artist of the Uzbek SSR (1937) – for creation of the musical drama "Gyulsary".
- People's Artist of USSR (1938)

== Works ==
=== Orchestral works ===
- Symphony No 1 in E♭ major, Op. 8 (1900)
- Symphony No 2 in C minor, Op. 25 (1907)
- Sireny (The Sirens) in F minor, symphonic poem, Op. 33 (1908)
- Symphony No 3 (Ilya Muromets) in B minor, Op. 42 (1911). (Premiere by the Russian Musical Society in Moscow under Emil Cooper on 23 March 1912.)
- Zaporozhtsy (The Zaporozhy Cossacks), symphonic poem-ballet, Op. 64 (1921; performed only in concert)
- Na prazdnik Kominterna! (Fantasy for the Comintern Festival), Fantasy for military wind orchestra (1924)
- Marsh Krasnoy Armii (March of the Red Army) for wind orchestra (1924)
- Symphonic Fragment (1934)
- Geroitshesky marsh Buryatskoy-Mongolskoy ASSR (Heroic March for the Buryat-Mongolian ASSR), C major, Op. 71 (1934–1936)
- Torzhestvennaya uvertyura k 20-letiyu Oktyabrya (Festive Overture for the 20th Anniversary of the October-Revolution), Op. 72 (1937)
- Ferganskiy Prazdnik (Holiday in Ferghana) Overture Op 75
- Pokhodny marsh (Field March) for wind orchestra, Op. 76 (1941)
- Druzhba narodov (The friendship of the peoples), Overture on the 5th anniversary of the Soviet Constitution, Op. 79 (1941)
- 25 let Krasnoy Armii (25 Years of the Red Army), Overture for wind orchestra, Op. 84 (1943)
- Pobeda (Victory), Overture, Op. 86 (1944); version for wind orchestra, Op. 86a
- Concert Waltz in D♭ major, Op. 90 (1950)

=== Concerti ===
- Concerto for harp and orchestra in E♭ major, Op. 74 (1938)
- Concerto for coloratura soprano (oboe, or leggero tenor 8vb) and orchestra in F minor, Op. 82 (1943) (Can also be played on the Violin, Cello, or Fifths tuned Double Bass).
- Concerto for cello and orchestra in D minor, Op. 87 (1946)
- Concerto for horn and orchestra in B♭ major, Op. 91 (1951)
- Concerto for violin and orchestra (Concerto-Allegro) in G minor, Op. 100 (1956), completed and orchestrated by Boris Lyatoshynsky (can also be played on a Cello or Fifths tuned Double Bass)

=== Vocal works ===
- Songs
- Chorales
- Cantatas

=== Chamber music ===
- String Sextet No 1 in C minor, Op. 1 (1898)
- String Quartet No 1 in A major, Op. 2 (1899)
- Romance for violin and piano in D major, Op. 3 (1902)
- Ballade for Cello and Piano, Op. 4 (1902)
- String Octet in D major, Op. 5 (1902)
- String Sextet No 2 in B minor, Op. 7 (1904)
- Intermezzo and Tarantella for double bass and piano, Op. 9
- String Sextet No 3 in C major, Op. 11 (1904)
- String Quartet No 2 in G minor, Op. 20 (1905)
- Praeludium and Scherzo for double bass and piano, Op. 32
- 11 Pieces for Different Instruments and piano, Op. 35
  - 2 Pieces for Flute and Piano
    - 1. Mélodie
    - 2. Valse
  - 2 Pieces for Oboe or Violin and Piano
    - 3. Chanson
    - 4. Andante
  - 1 Piece for Violoncello and Piano
    - 5. Apassionate
  - 2 Pieces for Clarinet and Piano
    - 6. Romance
    - 7. Valse triste
  - 2 Pieces for Bassoon and Piano
    - 8. Humoresque
    - 9. Impromptu
  - 2 Pieces for Horn and Piano
    - 10. Nocturne
    - 11. Intermezzo
- 8 Duets for Violin and Cello, Op. 39 (1909)
- 12 Duos for 2 Violins, Op. 49 (1909)
- 2 Romances for voice and piano, Op. 50 (1909)
- 12 Album leaves for Cello and Piano, Op. 51 (1910)
- 10 Duos for 2 Cellos, Op.53
- String Quartet No 3 in D minor, Op. 67 (1927)
- String Quartet No 4 in F minor, Op. 83 (1943)

=== Piano ===
Numerous piano pieces

- 2 Pieces for Piano, Op. 16 (1904)
  - Prélude in C minor
  - Romance in E major
- 5 Esquisses, Op.17 (1904)
- 3 Morceaux for Piano, Op, 19 (1905) (from the IMSLP Petrucci Music Library)
- 3 Pieces for Piano, Op. 21 (1905) (from the IMSLP Petrucci Music Library)
- 25 preludes for piano, Op. 30 (from the Sibley Music Library Digital Scores Collection)
- 2 Esquisses, Op.40 (1909)
- 6 Morceaux pour 2 Pianos, Op. 41 (1910?) (from the IMSLP Petrucci Music Library)
- 8 pièces faciles pour piano, Op. 43 (from the IMSLP Petrucci Music Library)
- 12 Esquisses, Op.47 (1909) (has also been arranged for organ, and violin/piano)
- 12 morceaux for piano 4-hands, Op. 48 (from the Sibley Music Library Digital Scores Collection)
- 12 Pièces enfantines pour piano (from the IMSLP Petrucci Music Library)
- 3 Esquisses, Op.56 (1910)

=== Stage music ===
==== Opera ====
- Earth and Heaven, opera-oratorio (1900), after the poem by Lord Byron
- Shakh-Senem, opera, Op. 69 (1923–25)
- Rachel, opera in one act, Op.81 (1942–43), libretto by Mikhail Bulgakov after Maupassant's Mademoiselle Fifi
- Leyli va Medzhnun, [Uzbekian] opera, Op. 94 (1940), co-author Talib Sadykov
- Gyul'sara, opera, Op. 96 (1936, rev. 1949), co-author Talib Sadykov

==== Ballet ====
- Khrizis, Op. 65 (1912, rev. 1925), Mime Ballet
- Komedianty (The Comedians), Op. 68 (1922, rev. 1930 and 1935 as Doch' Kastilii (The Daughter of Castille))
- Krasny mak (The Red Poppy), Op. 70 (1927, rev. 1949 and 1955 Krasny tsvetok (The Red Flower))
- Cleopatra, Op. 78 (1925), Mime Ballet
- Medny vsadnik (The Bronze Horseman; after Alexander Pushkin), Op. 89 (1948/49)
- Taras Bulba (after Nikolai Gogol), Op. 92 (1952)

=== Film music ===
- Alisher Navoi co-author Talib Sadykov (1947)

=== Instrumental solos ===
- Impromptu for harp
- Prelude & Scherzo for Double Bass
- Intermezzo & Tarantella for Double Bass

== See also ==
- List of Ukrainian composers
- List of People's Artists of the Azerbaijan SSR
