= Hamburg Concerto =

Horn Concerto by György Ligeti

Hamburg Concerto (Hamburgisches Konzert) for solo horn and chamber orchestra with four obbligato natural horns is one of György Ligeti's last works, composed in 1998–99 and revised in 2003.

The work was commissioned by the ZEIT-Foundation, expressing the special wish that it should be associated with the City of Hamburg. It is dedicated to the German horn player Marie Luise Neunecker, who premiered the original six movements with the Asko Ensemble in January 2001 in Hamburg (the place of the premiere being another special wish from the ZEIT-foundation).

The final revision is cast in seven movements:

1. Praeludium
2. Signale, Tanz, Choral
3. Aria, Aksak, Hoketus
4. Solo, Intermezzo, Mixtur, Kanon
5. Spectra
6. Capriccio
7. Hymnus

György Ligeti wrote about his work:

In this piece I experimented with very unusual non-harmonic sound spectra. In the small orchestra there are four natural horns, each of which can produce the 2nd to the 16th overtone. By providing each horn or group of horns with different fundamentals I was able to construct novel sound spectra from the resulting overtones. These harmonies, which had never been used before, sound "weird" in relation to harmonic spectra. I developed both "weird" consonant and dissonant harmonies, with complex beats. Horns blend very well together, and to enrich the sound further, the two clarinettists play basset horns. Even though it is replete with spectra of strange beats, the resulting overall sound is soft and mellow.

The name was chosen in analogy to Bach's Brandenburg Concertos (Brandenburgische Konzerte), Ligeti saw the naming as a dedication:

The ”ZEIT“ Foundation which commissioned the work had the special wish that the World Première should take place in Hamburg and the movement titles also be associated with the city. I thought to myself: Bach dedicated his well-known six Concerti grossi to the Margrave of Brandenburg – why should I not dedicate my horn concerto to the Free and Hanseatic City of Hamburg?

On the centenary of Ligeti's birth in 2023, The “Hamburgisches Konzert” by György Ligeti was released, the most exhaustive and complete analysis on this work, written by the composer Alessio Elia and published by the German publisher Edition Impronta.

Elia, one of the leading scholars of Ligetian music, takes us inside this last work by integrating different analytical approaches, from structural to spectral analysis, from aural analysis to the meticulous study of the manuscript and the notes kept at the Sacher Foundation in Basel among which Elia found two unpublished movements of the Concerto, not included in the final score, and published for the first time in this book together with all the preparatory sketches.

A substantial chapter is dedicated to the numerous errors (over 300) present in the printed score, including the instrumental parts, and in the manuscript, which have irreparably compromised all the performances and recordings of the Concert to date.

The complete revision of the score done by Alessio Elia, present in the book together with the presentation of possible solutions to the problematic points of the manuscript, resolved through the understanding of the compositional logic that underlies it, converged in the first revised performance of the Hamburg Concerto which took place at the Budapest Music Center on May 28, 2023, with the Concerto Budapest Ligeti Ensemble and Szabolcs Zempléni as solo horn. The orchestra should have been conducted by Peter Eötvös, replaced due to indisposition by Gergely Vajda.
