= Horn Concerto (Glière) =

1951 composition by Reinhold Glière

Reinhold Glière's Concerto for Horn and Orchestra in B♭ major, Op. 91, was completed in 1951. It was premiered on May 10, 1951 by Russian horn player Valery Polekh in Leningrad (later renamed St. Petersburg) with the Leningrad Radio Symphony Orchestra.

== Background ==
Polekh met Glière at the Bolshoi Theatre in 1950, during a break in a rehearsal of Glière's ballet The Bronze Horseman. During this brief encounter, Polekh suggested that Glière write a concerto for the horn. Glière promised he would work on a concerto in his free time. Polekh later met with Glière and demonstrated the capabilities of the horn to him; a year later, Glière finished writing the concerto.

The Horn Concerto is perhaps the best known of Glière's acclaimed works. The addition of valves in the early 19th century allowed composers a greater flexibility in their compositions, and the horn became a full range solo instrument. Many composers, valuing its large range and unique tone, incorporated it more prominently in their compositions.

== Structure ==
Despite being composed in the 1950s, the concerto is written in a neoclassical style with strong Romantic influences. Three movements comprise the concerto:

1. Allegro
2. Andante
3. Moderato – Allegro vivace

The standard cadenza played with the concerto was written by Valery Polekh, the first to perform the concerto. Polekh's cadenza is very much in the style of the concerto, and its virtuosic demands far exceed the majority of the piece. Because of this, many horn players prefer to modify this standard cadenza, while still more write their own; some horn players, however, play the exact cadenza written by Polekh.

== Discography ==
One of the major works in the horn repertoire, the concerto has been recorded a number of times.

Given its duration (roughly 22 minutes) it is quite common to find this Horn Concerto on the same CD with other horn concerti, or Glière's ballet The Bronze Horseman.

The foremost example is probably Eric Ruske's 2005 recording performed with the IRIS Chamber Orchestra, conducted by Michael Stern. Ruske plays Polekh's cadenza with slight variations.

Another recording of particular note is Marie Luise Neunecker's recording with the Bamberg Symphony Orchestra conducted by Werner Andreas Albert. Neunecker performs Polekh's cadenza.

In the Hermann Baumann recording with the Leipzig Gewandhaus Orchestra conducted by Kurt Masur, Baumann does not play Polekh's cadenza, but wrote his own.

A lesser known recording, though highly reviewed, is Eliz Erkalp's recording with the Royal Flemish Philharmonic, Marc Soustrot conducting.
