= Asko/Schönberg =

Dutch chamber orchestra

Asko|Schönberg is a Dutch music ensemble that specialises in contemporary classical music, especially that of the 21st century. It was formed by a merging of the Asko Ensemble and the Schönberg Ensemble in 2009. On 4 September 2025 the ensemble changed its name to Het Muziek.

== Asko Ensemble ==
Formed in 1965 and based in Amsterdam, the Asko Ensemble performed regular concerts along with film music programs, dance and multimedia projects, and modern opera. The ensemble was conducted the first five years by Jan Vriend and subsequent working with Cliff Crego. Riccardo Chailly, Oliver Knussen, Reinbert de Leeuw, George Benjamin, Stefan Asbury, and Peter Rundel.

The Asko Ensemble has released nearly one hundred recordings, featuring works by Louis Andriessen, Roberto Carnevale, Elliott Carter, György Ligeti, Bruno Maderna, Olivier Messiaen, Edgard Varèse, Claude Vivier, Iannis Xenakis, and many others.

First performances include:

- Brian Ferneyhough's Terrain (Amsterdam, April 1992).
- Karlheinz Stockhausen's Orchester-Finalisten from Mittwoch aus Licht (Amsterdam, 14 June 1996) and Glanz from Klang (Amsterdam, 19 June 2008).
- Elliott Carter's Asko Concerto (Amsterdam, 26 April 2000) conducted by Oliver Knussen.
- Ligeti's Hamburg Concerto (Hamburg, 20 January 2001) with its dedicatee, Marie Luise Neunecker.
- Michel van der Aa's opera After Life (Amsterdam, 6 February 2006).
- Ermis Theodorakis' Music for 5 (Amsterdam, 17 April 2006).
- Mary Finsterer's In Praise of Darkness (Amsterdam, 23 April 2009), which won the A$25,000 Paul Lowin Orchestral Prize for 2009.
- Julian Anderson's The Comedy of Change (London, 8 September 2009).
- Lonneke van Leth Producties’ De Odyssee, composed by Maxim Shalygin (Amsterdam, 13 August 2014)
- Rozalie Hirs's parallel sea to the lighthouse (Utrecht, 13 May 2018) with its dedicatees, Ernestine Stoop and Godelieve Schrama.

== Schönberg Ensemble ==
The Schönberg Ensemble was founded in 1974 by students and former students of the Royal Conservatory of The Hague.

Their original repertoire consisted only of the chamber music of composers of the Second Viennese School. Afterwards, the repertoire was expanded to the entire twentieth (and twenty-first) century. A large number of Dutch and foreign composers wrote works specifically for the Schönberg Ensemble.

Concerts were given with constantly changing combinations of players, as contemporary classical repertoire often requires unusual combinations of instruments. If a larger ensemble was required, the ensemble joined with the Asko Ensemble.

The Schönberg Ensemble was based in the Muziekgebouw aan 't IJ in Amsterdam, where the ensemble gave regular concerts. In addition, they also played regularly at the Concertgebouw in Amsterdam and several other venues in the Netherlands. The ensemble toured almost all of the countries of Europe, and also Canada, the United States, India, and Japan.

== Merging ==
After performing and recording together many times, the Asko Ensemble and the Schönberg Ensemble merged on 1 September 2008 to become Asko|Schönberg, with Reinbert de Leeuw as conductor. The new group formalised the union with a Messiaen concert on 1 January 2009. Asko|Schönberg focuses on developing new interdisciplinary work by living composers and music-theatre makers, and innovates concert practice with immersive techniques and scenography.
