= Valery Polekh =

Valery Vladimirovich Polekh (5 July 1918 – 6 September 2006) was a Soviet horn player. The horn concerto Op.91 by Reinhold Glière was dedicated to him.
