= Michael David-Fox =

Historian (born 1965)

- Born: May 21, 1965 (age 61)

Academic background
- Education: Princeton University (AB); Yale University (PhD)

Academic work
- Main interests: Comparative history, Germany–Russia relations, Russian history, Russian Revolution, Soviet history, Stalinism, transnational history

Michael David-Fox (born May 21, 1965) is an American historian who studies modern Russia and the Soviet Union.

== Biography ==
David-Fox received his A.B. from Princeton University and his Ph.D. from Yale University.

David-Fox has been a professor at the Higher School of Economics since 2014, and director of the Center for Eurasian, Russian and East European Studies in Georgetown University's Walsh School of Foreign Service. He is a founding editor of Kritika: Explorations in Russian and Eurasian History, for which he received the 2010 Distinguished Editor Award from the Council of Editors of Learned Journals.

He has been a fellow, visiting professor, and honorary professor in France, Germany, and Russia, and Kennan Institute member. In the Spring of 1996, David-Fox was a Fellow at the Swedish Collegium for Advanced Study in Uppsala, Sweden. In 2017, he was awarded a fellowship at the John Simon Guggenheim Memorial Foundation for his study of European and Latin American history.

As of 2021, he is the author of several books, nine edited volumes, twelve edited special theme issues of peer-reviewed academic journals, and about 50 articles and chapters.

On 1 August 2026, Michael David-Fox succeeded Misha Glenny as the Rector of the Institute for Human Sciences (IWM) in Vienna.

== Bibliography ==
=== Articles ===
- David-Fox, Michael (Winter 2004). "On the Primacy of Ideology. Soviet Revisionists and Holocaust Deniers (In Response to Martin Malia)". Kritika: Explorations in Russian and Eurasian History. 5 (1). Bloomington, Indiana: Slavic: 81–105. doi:10.1353/kri.2004.0007. S2CID 159716738.
- David-Fox, Michael (Fall 2011). "The Implications of Transnationalism". Kritika. 12 (4). Slavica Publishers: 885–904. doi:10.1353/kri.2011.0059. S2CID 159947876 – via Humanities Commons.
- David-Fox, Michael (Fall 2016). "Modernost' v Rossi ii SSSR: otsutstvuiushchaia, obshchaia, al'ternativnaia, perepletennaia?" Модерность в России и СССР: отсутствующая, общая, альтернативная, переплетенная? [Modernity in Russia and the USSR: Absent, Common, Alternative, Intertwined?]. Novoe Literaturnoe Obozrenie (140). New Literary Observer: 19–44. doi:10.17613/M6QR4R.
  - David-Fox, Michael (Fall 2016). "Russian—Soviet Modernity: None, Shared, Alternative, or Entangled?". Novoe Literaturnoe Obozrenie (140). New Literary Observer: 19–44. doi:10.17613/M6QR4R – via Humanities Commons.
- David-Fox, Michael (Fall 2016). "Modernost' kak voobrazhaemoe, modernost' kak instrument: Est' li dvizhenie vpered?" Модерность как воображаемое, модерность как инструмент: Есть ли движение вперед? [Modernity as Imaginary, Modernity as Tool: Is There a Way Forward?]. Novoe Literaturnoe Obozrenie (140). New Literary Observer: 79–91 – via Humanities Commons.
- David-Fox, Michael (Fall 2016). "The People's War: Ordinary People and Regime Strategies in a World of Extremes". Slavic Review. 75 (3). Cambridge University Press: 551–559. doi:10.5612/slavicreview.75.3.0551. JSTOR 10.5612/slavicreview.75.3.0551. S2CID 167128717 – via Humanities Commons.
- David-Fox, Michael (Winter 2016). "The Leader and the System". Kritika. 17 (1). Slavica Publishers: 119–129. doi:10.1353/kri.2016.0009. S2CID 56063152 – via Humanities Commons.
- David-Fox, Michael (Fall 2017). "Toward a Life Cycle Analysis of the Russian Revolution". Kritika. 18 (4). Slavica Publishers: 741–783. doi:10.1353/kri.2017.0049. S2CID 165293255 – via Humanities Commons.

=== Books ===
- David-Fox, Michael (1997). Revolution of the Mind: Higher Learning Among the Bolsheviks, 1918–1929 (illustrated hardcover ed.). Ithaca, New York: Cornell University Press. ISBN 9780801431289 – via Google Books.
- David-Fox, Michael (2012). Showcasing the Great Experiment: Cultural Diplomacy and Western Visitors to the Soviet Union, 1921–1941 (illustrated hardcover ed.). New York City, New York: Oxford University Press, USA. doi:10.1093/acprof:oso/9780199794577.001.0001. ISBN 9780199794577 – via Google Books.
- David-Fox, Michael; Holquist, Peter; Martin, Alexander M. (2012). Fascination and Enmity: Russia and Germany as Entangled Histories, 1914–1945 (illustrated paperback reprint ed.). Pittsburgh, Pennsylvania: University of Pittsburgh Press. ISBN 9780822962076 – via Google Books.
- David-Fox, Michael; Holquist, Peter; Martin, Alexander M. (2014). The Holocaust in the East: Local Perpetrators and Soviet Responses (paperback reprint ed.). Pittsburgh, Pennsylvania: University of Pittsburgh Press. ISBN 9780822962939 – via Google Books.
- David-Fox, Michael (2015). Crossing Borders: Modernity, Ideology, and Culture in Russia and the Soviet Union (E-book ed.). Pittsburgh, Pennsylvania: University of Pittsburgh Press. ISBN 9780822980926 – via Google Books.
- David-Fox, Michael, ed. (2016). The Soviet Gulag: Evidence, Interpretation, and Comparison (illustrated hardcover ed.). Pittsburgh, Pennsylvania: University of Pittsburgh Press. ISBN 9780822944645 – via Google Books.

=== Chapters ===
- David-Fox, Michael (2017). "Intellectuals and Communism". In Pons, Silvio; Smith, Stephen A. (eds.). World Revolution and Socialism in One Country. Cambridge History of Communism. Vol. 1 (E-book ed.). Cambridge, England: Cambridge University Press. ISBN 9781108210416 – via Google Books and Humanities Commons.
- David-Fox, Michael (2017). "Communism and Intellectuals". In Pons, Silvio; Smith, Stephen A. (eds.). The Cambridge History of Communism: World Revolution and Socialism in One Country 1917–1941. The Cambridge History of Communism. Vol. 1 (E-book ed.). Cambridge, England: Cambridge University Press. pp. 526–550. ISBN 9781108210416 – via Google Books.

=== Essays ===
- David-Fox, Michael (July 2019). "Syncretic Subcultures or Stalinism without Stalin? Soviet Partisans as Communities of Violence". Russian Review. 78 (3): 486–501. doi:10.1111/russ.12241. ISSN 1467-9434. S2CID 210460658 – via Humanities Commons.
- David-Fox, Michael (March 2018). "Bolshevik Millenarianism as Academic Blockbuster". Canadian-American Slavic Studies. 52 (1): 75–86. doi:10.1163/22102396-05201005 – via Humanities Commons.

=== Reviews ===
- David-Fox, Michael (January 2002). "Obshchestvennye organizatsii Rossii v 1920-e gody (review)". Kritika. 3 (1). Slavica Publishers: 173–181. doi:10.1353/kri.2002.0004. S2CID 48244947 – via Humanities Commons.
