= Russian Association of Proletarian Musicians =

The Russian Association of Proletarian Musicians or RAPM (Russian: Российская Ассоциация Пролетарских Музыкантов, РАПМ) was a musicians' creative union of the early Soviet period. It was founded in June 1923, by Lev Shul'gin, Aleksei Sergeev, and David Chernomoridikov. RAPM's members advocated "mass songs" for choirs, easily accessible melodies that were often inspired by folk tunes, and which songs were often collectively composed. The RAPM initially had the task of liaising with composers, critics, educators and administrators sympathetic with the regime. However, it soon became clear to the founders of RAPM that the organization was outgrowing its role as an advisory body, and tensions grew between members. By 1924, Shul'gin and Sergeev left the organization, believing the content being produced was either too simplistic, or too inaccessible to actual workers. Sergeev and Shul'gin, along with most of the composers from RAPM would go on to form the Revolutionary Composers and Musical Activist group (ORKMiD). Left with few composers, the RAPM would deteriorate, as the political context of the time (the New Economic Policy, encouraging ties to the West) favoured the Association for Contemporary Music, which accepted western music. The RAPM would become an ideological and aesthetic opponent against the Association for Contemporary Music. Close to RAPM's ideology was the organization "Prokoll" (Production Collective of Students of the Moscow Conservatory), created in the mid-1920s, which included, in particular, composers Alexander Davidenko, Viktor Bely, Boris Shekhter, and later also Dmitry Kabalevsky and Aram Khachaturian. The main core of Prokoll, led by the leader of the organization, Alexander Davidenko, merged with RAPM in 1929.

The RAPM sought to develop a musical style which evoked feelings of unison and solidarity. A typical example of this might be a choir singing in complete unison, with very little polyphonic variance: the unity of the singers would emphasize the notion of solidarity while the style would be reminiscent of folk music for the sake of accessibility.

On 23 April 1932 it was disbanded, together with other unions, such as Russian Association of Proletarian Writers, by the Decree on the Reformation of Literary and Artistic Organizations.

== Notes ==
=== Further reading ===
- Neil Edmunds, "Music and Politics: The Case of the Russian Association of Proletarian Musicians", The Slavonic and East European Review, January 2000, Vol. 78, No. 1, pp. 66–89.
- Amy Nelson, "The Struggle for Proletarian Music: RAPM and the Cultural Revolution", Slavic Review, Spring 2000, Vol. 58, No. 1, pp. 101–132.
