= On Cooperation =

1923 article by Vladimir Lenin

"On Cooperation" is an article by Vladimir Lenin. It was written on 6 January 1923 and published in Pravda in issues 115 and 116 on 26 and 27 May 1923. It is one of Lenin's last works. He consulted a number of books on cooperation while writing the article.

== Contents ==
In this article, Lenin emphasizes the great importance of cooperation in a multistructure economy in a country with a predominantly peasant population. He claims that cooperation allows for the achievement of:

the degree of combination of private interest, private commercial interest, the verification and control of it by the state, the degree of subordination to its common interests, which used to be a stumbling block for many, many socialists.

Lenin believes that cooperation would allow the peasantry to transition to socialism in a simpler and easier way.

Lenin emphasizes that in a mixed economy under the dictatorship of the proletariat, cooperative enterprises constitute an important step in the transition from private capitalist enterprises to socialist ones. To develop cooperation, Lenin proposes providing cooperative enterprises with various benefits, as well as raising the cultural level of the peasantry in every way. The Leninist concept of a mixed economy is formulated as follows:

And the system of civilized cooperators with public ownership of the means of production, with the class victory of the proletariat over the bourgeoisie – this is the system of socialism.

Lenin's ideas about the cooperation of the peasantry formed the basis of the resolution of the 13th Congress of the Russian Communist Party (Bolsheviks) "On Cooperation" and "On Work in the Village".

== Analysis ==
Alexander Yakovlev notes the views Lenin expresses in the article differ from those of Karl Marx and Friedrich Engels on the subject of combining personal interest with the public interest, as Marx and Engels were opposed to the ideas of the old cooperators, namely Charles Fourier, Victor Prosper Considerant, Henri de Saint-Simon.

Roy Medvedev notes that the Leninist principles of voluntariness and gradualism in the cooperation of the peasantry were grossly violated by Joseph Stalin during collectivization, which caused enormous economic and moral damage.

== Sources ==
- Chayanov, Alexander (1919). The Main Ideas and Forms of Organization of Peasant Cooperation. Moscow.
- Lenin, Vladimir (1977). Recent Letters and Articles. Moscow: Political Publishing House. p. 71.
- Medvedev, Roy (1990). About Stalin and Stalinism. Moscow: Progress Publishers. p. 488. ISBN 5-01-002546-9.
- Meshcheryakov, Nikolai (1920). Cooperation and Socialism. Moscow.
- Prokopovich, Sergei (1913). Cooperative Movement in Russia, its Theory and Practice. Moscow.
- Sassen (1919). The Development of the Theory of Cooperation in the Era of Capitalism. Moscow.
- Staudinger, Franz (1919a). Marxism and Consumer Cooperation. Moscow.
- Staudinger, Franz (1919b). From Schulze-Delitzsch to Kreuznach. Moscow.
- Tugan-Baranovsky, Mikhail (1916). Social Foundations of Cooperation. Moscow.
- Yakovlev, Alexander (1991). The Torment of Reading Being. Moscow: News. p. 368. ISBN 5-7020-0382-9.
