= Concerto for Coloratura Soprano =

1943 composition by Reinhold Glière

Concerto for Coloratura Soprano, Op. 82 is a 1943 concerto by Russian composer Reinhold Glière.
