= Viktor Bely =

Viktor Arkadyevich Bely (Russian: Ви́ктор Арка́дьевич Бе́лый; original name Дави́д Аро́нович Вейс; 14 January 1904 – 6 March 1983), was a Soviet composer and social activist.

Bely was born in Berdichev, in the Kiev Governorate of the Russian Empire (present-day Ukraine). In 1929 he graduated from the Moscow Conservatory and later taught on the faculty of that school from 1935–1948. In 1939 he became a member of Union of Soviet Composers. He was awarded the Stalin Prize in 1952 and was named an honored artist of the Russian Soviet Federative Socialist Republic in 1956. In 1980 he was endowed with the honorary title of People's Artist of the RSFSR.

== Selected works ==
Chamber music

- Poème (Поэма) for viola and piano (1921)
- Sonata for violin and piano (1953)

Piano

- Variations (Вариации) (1921)
- Piano Sonata No. 1 (1923)
- 2 Fugues (2 фуги) (1925)
- Piano Sonata No. 2 (1926)
- Lyrical Sonatina (Лирическая сонатина) (1928)
- 3 Miniatures on Bashkortostani Themes (3 миниатюры на башк. темы) (1939)
- Piano Sonata No. 3 (1941)
- Piano Sonata No. 4 (1946)
- 16 Preludes on Soviet Melodies (16 прелюдий на мелодии народов СССР) (1947)
- 5 Pieces on Belarusian Folk Themes (5 пьес на белорусских народные темы) (1950)
- 4 Pieces on Tajikistani Themes (4 пьесы на таджикистана темы) (1955)
- 10 Pieces for Children (10 детских пьес) (1967)
