= Elizaveta Kruglikova =

Russian artist (1865–1941)

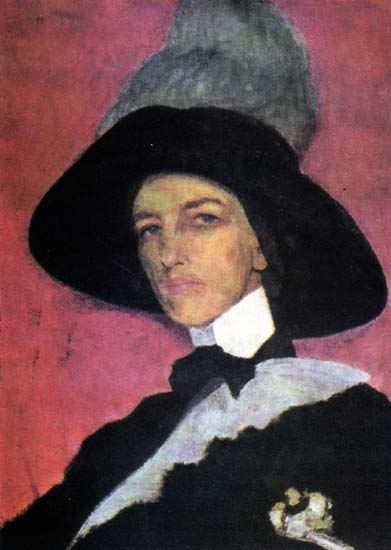
- Self-portrait (1910)
- Born: 31 January 1865; Saint Petersburg, Russian Empire
- Died: 21 July 1941 (aged 76); Leningrad, Soviet Union
- Known for: Painting

Elizaveta Sergeyevna Kruglikova (Russian: Елизавета Сергеевна Кругликова; 31 January [O.S. 19 January] 1865 – 21 July 1941) was a Russian-Soviet painter, etcher, silhouettist and monotypist.

== Biography ==
She was born in Saint Petersburg to Olga Yuliyevna Neyman (1836–1922) and Sergey Nikolaevich Kruglikov (1832–1910). Her father was a military officer who was an amateur painter, and her grandfather, Nikolai Alexandrovich Kruglikov (1788–1868), was a professional painter. In 1880, she lived with her father in Poltava, where she first met artists associated with the Peredvizhniki and decided on art as a career. From 1890 to 1895, she attended classes at the Moscow School of Painting, Sculpture and Architecture, where she studied with Illarion Pryanishnikov, Sergei Korovin and Abram Arkhipov.

In 1895, she continued her studies in Paris at the Académie Colarossi and the Académie Vitti. She set up her own studio in 1900 and, from 1902, studied etching with Joseph-Victor Roux-Champion (1871–1953). After 1909, she was also a teacher at the Académie de La Palette.

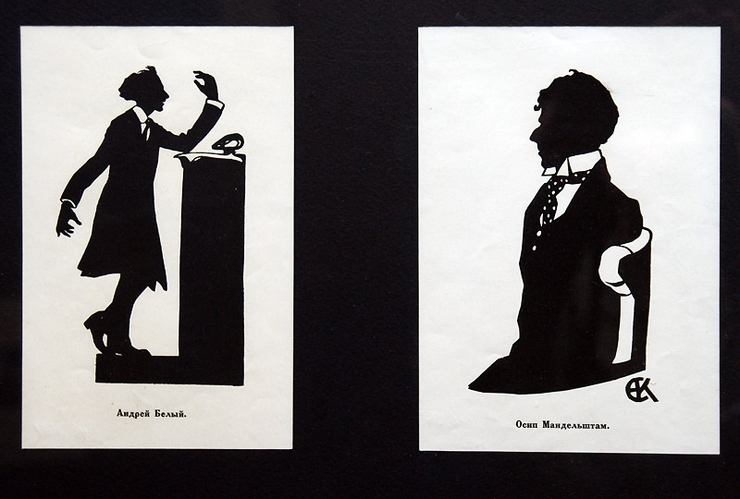
Silhouettes of Andrey Biely and Osip Mandelstam

At the beginning of World War I, she returned to Saint Petersburg and became associated with Mir Iskusstva. In 1916, she published a book of monotypes called Paris on the Eve of the War and donated the proceeds to Russian artists who were stranded in France.

In 1919, she was one of the founders of the State Puppet Theater, where she also designed puppets. This was a predecessor to the State Central Puppet Theater established by Sergey Obraztsov in 1931. From 1922 to 1929, she was a professor at the Higher Art and Technical Studios (formerly the Imperial Academy of Arts), where she taught theatrical and decorative painting. She also designed posters and published a popular series of silhouettes, Poets, followed by another on Leaders of the Revolution.

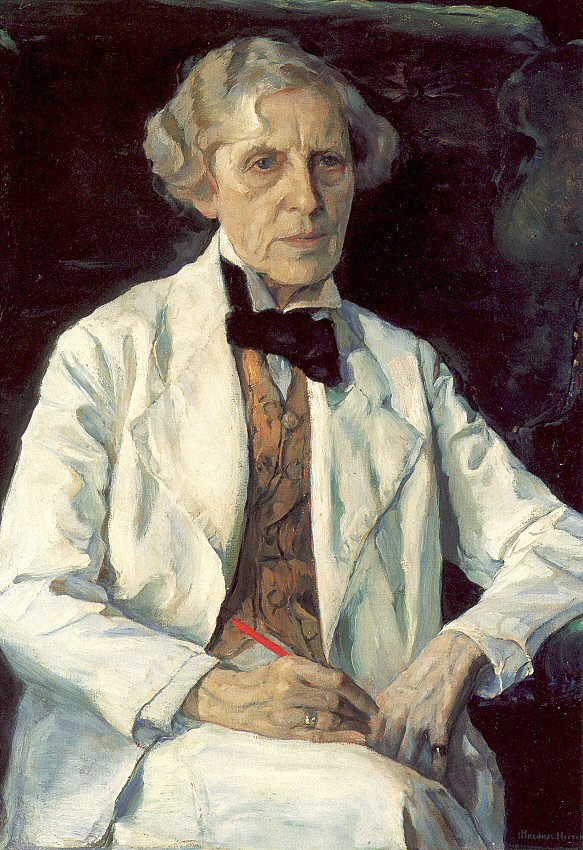
Kruglikova by Nesterov, 1939

A prolific exhibitor, she participated in virtually all of the shows held in the Soviet Union as well as several abroad, including the Venice Biennale (1928). Kruglikova was the subject of a pencil portrait in 1933 by Pyotr Neradovsky and paintings by Mikhail Nesterov in 1938 and 1939. Inactive throughout much of the 1930s, she went to Moscow in 1939 to help organize an exhibition featuring works by the former members of Mir Iskusstva.

She was known for reviving older etching and printing techniques, such as the mezzotint and aquatint, but was especially well known for monotypes. In 2009, the Fourth International Festival of Monotypes was dedicated to her.

Kruglikova died on 21 July 1941 in Leningrad (previously, and again today, St. Petersburg), aged seventy-six; she's interred into the Literatorskiye Mostki.

== Family ==
Elizaveta was a younger sister of Nikolai Sergeyevich Kruglikov (1861–1920), an engineer best known for his service as deputy chief of construction of the Ussurian Railway (Vladivostok-Khabarovsk). He served under two successive chiefs of construction, Alexander Ivanovich Ursati (March 1891 – October 1892) and Orest Polienovich Vyazemsky (October 1892 – November 1897). In 1909 he was one of the founders of the Intimate Theater Art Society. Elizaveta painted a portrait of her brother in 1910, an excellent likeness of Nikolai Sergeyevich sitting on the porch of his country home and holding a book.

== Other selected works ==
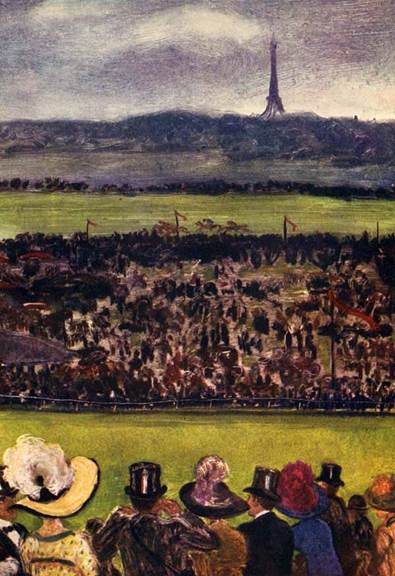
Horse Race (monotype)

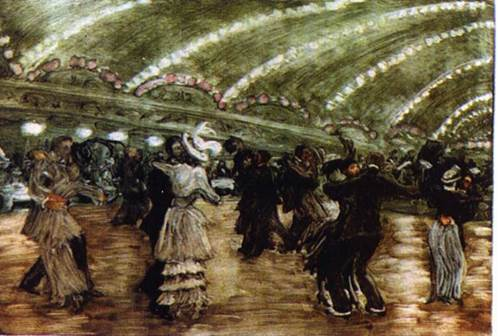
Tango at Luna Park (monotype)

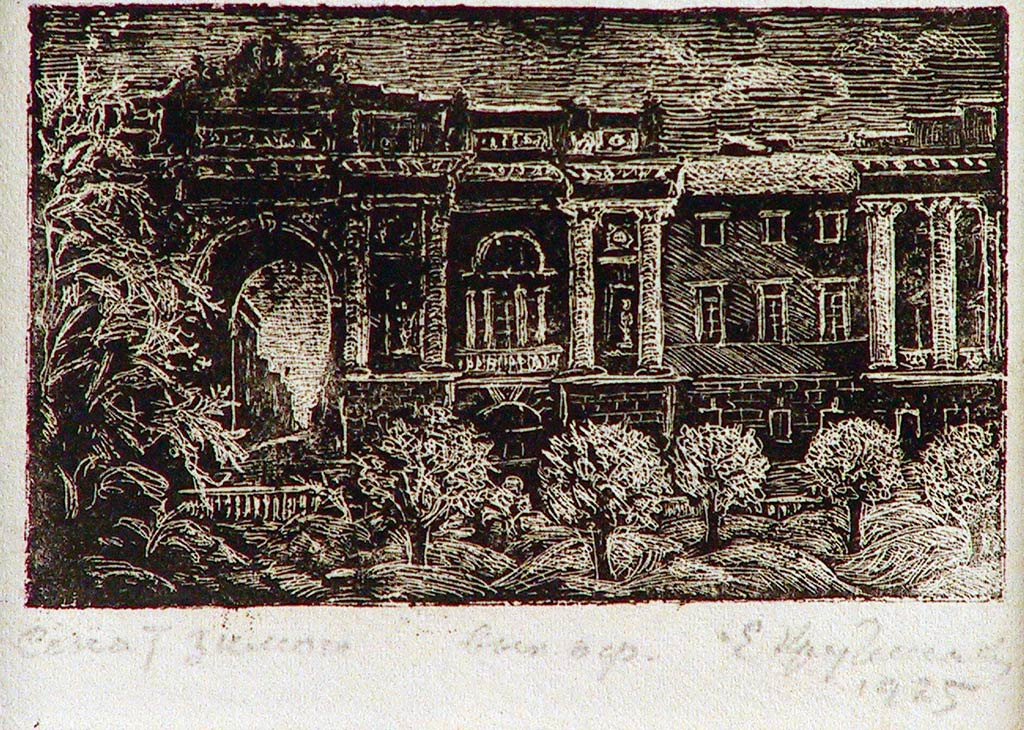
The Senate Building in Winter (mezzotint)

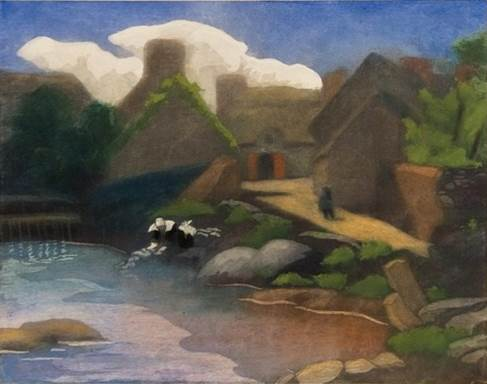
Pond at Pont-Aven (aquatint)
