= Flute concerto =

Musical work for solo flute and ensemble

A flute concerto is a concerto for solo flute and instrumental ensemble, customarily the orchestra. Such works have been written from the Baroque period, when the solo concerto form was first developed, up through the present day. Some major composers have contributed to the flute concerto repertoire, with the best known works including those by Mozart and Vivaldi.

Traditionally a three-movement work, the modern-day flute concerto has occasionally been structured in four or more movements. In some flute concertos, especially from the Baroque and modern eras, the flute is accompanied by a chamber ensemble rather than an orchestra.

== Selected repertoire ==
=== Baroque ===
Michel Blavet

- Concerto in A minor

Jean-Marie Leclair

- Concerto in C major, Op. 7, No. 3 (also for violin or oboe solo)

Giovanni Battista Pergolesi (attributed)

- Flute Concerto in G major
- Flute Concerto in D major

Johann Joachim Quantz (1697–1773) – composer of over 300 concertos for the flute.

- Concerto in G major, QV 5:174
- Concerto in C minor
- Concerto in G minor, QV 5:196
- Concerto in G minor, QV 5:206

Johan Helmich Roman (1694-1758)

- Flute Concerto in G major, BeRI 54

Georg Philipp Telemann

- Concerto in F major
- Concerto in D major, TWV 51:D1

Antonio Vivaldi

- Concerto in F major for Flute (La Tempesta di Mare), RV 433 (Op. 10, No. 1), RV 98 and RV 570
- Concerto in G minor for Flute (La Notte), RV 439 (Op. 10, No. 2)
- Concerto in D major for Flute (Il Gardellino), RV 428 (Op. 10 No. 3)
- Concerto in G major for Flute, RV 435 (Op. 10, No. 4)
- Concerto in F major for Flute, RV 434 (Op. 10, No. 5)
- Concerto in G major for Flute, RV 437 (Op. 10, No. 6)
- Concerto in A minor for Flute, RV 440
- Concerto in D major for Flute, RV 429
- Concerto in C major for 2 Flutes, RV 533
- Concerto in D major for Flute, RV 783

=== Classical ===
C.P.E. Bach (1714–1788)

- Flute Concerto in D major
- Flute Concerto in G major H.445 (Wq.169)
- Flute Concerto in D minor H.426
- Flute Concerto in A major H.438 (Wq.168)
- Flute concerto in A minor Wq.166
- Flute concerto in B flat major Wq 167

Franz Benda (1709–1786)

- Concerto in G minor
- Concerto in A minor

Domenico Cimarosa

- Concerto for Two Flutes in G Major (1783)

Franz Danzi

- Concerto No. 1 in G major
- Concerto No. 2 in D minor
- Concerto No. 3 in D minor
- Concerto No. 4 in D major

François Devienne

- Concerto No. 1 in D major
- Concerto No. 2 in D major
- Concerto No. 3 in G major
- Concerto No. 4 in G major
- Concerto No. 5 in G major
- Concerto No. 6 in D major
- Concerto No. 7 in E minor
- Concerto No. 8 in G major
- Concerto No. 9 in E minor
- Concerto No. 10 in D major
- Concerto No. 11 in B minor
- Concerto No. 12 in A major

Frederick the Great (1712–1786)

- 4 concertos for flute and strings

Christoph Willibald Gluck (attributed)

- Concerto in G major

Joseph Haydn

- Flute Concerto in D major (lost)

Leopold Hofmann

- Flute Concerto in D major (previously attributed to Haydn)

Franz Anton Hoffmeister

- Flute Concerto D major

Franz Krommer

- Flute Concerto Op.86

Franz Lachner

- Flute Concerto in D minor

Bernhard Molique

- Concerto in D minor for Flute and Orchestra

Leopold Mozart

- Flute Concerto in G major

Wolfgang Amadeus Mozart

- Concerto for Flute and Harp
- Flute Concerto No. 1
- Flute Concerto No. 2 – originally written as an Oboe Concerto but now also firmly part of the flute repertoire.

Josef Reicha

- Concerto for Flute and Orchestra (1781)

Andreas Romberg

- Flute Concerto

Antonio Rosetti

- Flute Concerto in G major
- Flute Concerto in C major
- Flute Concerto in F major

František Xaver Pokorný

- Flute Concerto in D Major (Boccherini, Op. 27)

Antonio Salieri

- Concerto for Flute, Oboe and Orchestra (1774)
- Concertino da camera for Flute and Strings (1777)

Carl Stamitz

- Concerto in G major

Peter Winter

- Flute Concerto No. 1 in D minor
- Flute Concerto No. 2 in D minor

=== Romantic ===
Peter Benoit

- Flute Concerto (Symphonic Tale)

François Borne

- Carmen Fantasie Brillante

Ferdinand Büchner

- Flute Concerto in F minor

Cécile Chaminade

- Flute Concertino in D major, Op. 107

Gaetano Donizetti

- Concertino for Flute and Chamber Orchestra in C minor (1819)
- Concertino for Flute and Orchestra in C major
- Concertino for Flute and Orchestra in D major

Franz Doppler

- Concerto in D minor for two flutes and orchestra

François-Joseph Fétis

- Flute Concerto in B minor

Saverio Mercadante

- Concerto in D major
- Concerto in E major
- Concerto in E minor
- Concerto in F major (2 movements)

Carl Reinecke

- Concerto in D major, Op. 283 (1908)

Carl Gottlieb Reissiger

- Concertino in D major for Flute and Orchestra

Bernhard Romberg

- Concerto in B minor 0202 2000 Strings

=== Modern ===
Samuel Adler

- Concerto for Flute and Orchestra (1977)

Kalevi Aho

- Flute Concerto

Robert Aitken

- Concerto for Flute and String Orchestra (Shadows V). (1999)

Sir Malcolm Arnold

- Concerto for Flute and Strings
- Flute Concerto No. 2

Aaron Avshalomov

- Flute Concerto

Leonardo Balada

- Flute Concerto (2000)

Flint Juventino Beppe

- Flute Mystery Op.66 a/b (Alto flute / C flute)
- Flute Concerto No.1 Op.70
- Flute Concerto No.2 Op.80

Leonard Bernstein

- Ḥalil, nocturne for flute, percussion, and strings

Rutland Boughton

- Concerto for Flute and Strings

Pierre Boulez

- ...explosante-fixe..., for MIDI-flute, chamber orchestra and electronics (1972–1993)

Henry Brant

- Concerto for flute solo with flute orchestra Ghosts & Gargoyles (2002)

John Carmichael

- Concerto for Flute and Orchestra: Phoenix Concerto 2222–4331 perc, harp, string, timpani

Elliott Carter

- Flute Concerto (2008)

John Corigliano

- Concerto for Flute and Orchestra: Pied Piper Fantasy

Marc-André Dalbavie

- Flute Concerto (2006)

Michael Daugherty

- Flute Concerto Trail Of Tears (2010)

Edison Denisov

- Flute Concerto (1975)

Pascal Dusapin

- Concerto for flute and string orchestra Galim (1998)

Eric Ewazen

- Concerto for Flute and Chamber Orchestra

Jindřich Feld

- Flute Concerto (1954)

Morton Feldman

- Flute and Orchestra (1978)

Arthur Foote

- Nocturne and Scherzo for Flute and String Orchestra

Lukas Foss

- Renaissance Concerto (1985) for Flute and Orchestra

Jean Françaix

- Double Concerto for Flute, Clarinet and Orchestra
- Flute Concerto (1967)

Harald Genzmer

- Flute Concerto

Geoffrey Gordon

- Concerto for Flute and Orchestra (2012) ()

Sofia Gubaidulina

- The Deceitful Face of Hope and Despair – Flute Concerto
- Music for Flute, Strings, and Percussion – Flute Concerto

Otar Gordeli

- Concerto for Flute and Orchestra, Op. 8

Charles T. Griffes

- Poem for Flute and Orchestra (1918)

Jorge Grundman

- Concerto for Flute and String Orchestra. On the Back of a Nightingale, Op. 31 (2012)
- Slow Concerto for Flute and String Orchestra. A Promise to Frida, Op. 84 (2021)

Howard Hanson

- Serenade for Solo Flute, Harp and String Orchestra

Chris Harman

- Concerto for flute and orchestra, Catacombs (1999–2000)

Jacques Hétu

- Concerto pour flûte

Vagn Holmboe

- Flute Concerto No. 1 (1975–6)
- Flute Concerto No. 2 (1981–2)

Alan Hovhaness

- Symphony no 36, Op. 312 for Flute and Orchestra (1978)

Jacques Ibert

- Flute Concerto (1934)

Andrew Imbrie

- Concerto for Flute and Orchestra (1977)

Gordon Jacob

- Concerto for Flute and String Orchestra op.1
- Concerto for Flute and String Orchestra op.2

André Jolivet

- Concerto (1949)

Giya Kancheli

- Ninna Nanna Per Anna (2008), for solo flute & strings

Aaron Jay Kernis

- Flute Concerto (2015)

Peter Paul Koprowski

- Flute Concerto

Aram Khachaturian

- Concerto for Flute and Orchestra – an arrangement of his Violin Concerto in D minor

Sophie Lacaze

- Het Lam Gods II, for solo flute and flute orchestra (2007)
- Les quatre elements, concerto for flute, children choir and percussions (2005)
- And then there was the sun in the sky, concerto for flute, digeridoo and flute orchestra (2000)

Lowell Liebermann

- Concerto for Flute and Orchestra Op.39 (1992)
- Concerto for Flute, Harp and Orchestra Op.48 (1995)

György Ligeti

- Double Concerto, for flute, oboe and orchestra

Jeff Manookian

- Concerto for Flute and Orchestra

Peter Mennin

- Concertino for Flute, Strings and Percussion (1945)
- Concerto for Flute and Orchestra (1983)

Olivier Messiaen

- Concert à quatre ("Quadruple concerto"), for piano, flute, oboe, cello and orchestra (1990–91)

Þorkell Sigurbjörnsson

- Liongate for Flute and Orchestra

Carl Nielsen

- Flute Concerto (1926)

Krzysztof Penderecki

- Flute Concerto (1992)

William P. Perry

- Summer Nocturne for Flute and Orchestra (1988)

Walter Piston

- Concerto for Flute and Orchestra (1971)

Yves Prin

- Le Souffle d'Iris (1986)

Behzad Ranjbaran

- Concerto for Flute and Orchestra (2013)

Einojuhani Rautavaara

- Flute Concerto Dances with the Winds

Jean Rivier

- Flute Concerto

Joaquín Rodrigo

- Concierto pastoral, for flute and orchestra (1978)

Ned Rorem

- Flute Concerto (2002)

Christopher Rouse

- Flute Concerto (1993)

Kaija Saariaho

- Flute Concerto Aile du songe (2001)

Aulis Sallinen

- Flute Concerto Harlekiini, Op. 70 (1995)

R. Murray Schafer

- Flute Concerto (1984)

Ole Schmidt

- Concerto for Flute and Strings

Laura Schwendinger

- Waking Dream for Flute and Orchestra (2009)

Eric Sessler

- Flute Concerto (2011)

Judith Shatin

- Ruah (1987)

Alexander Shchetynsky

- Flute Concerto (1993)

Emil Tabakov

- Concerto for 2 Flutes (2003)

Tōru Takemitsu

- Toward the Sea II, for alto flute, harp, and string orchestra

Josef Tal

- Concerto for Flute & Chamber Orchestra (1976)

Joan Tower

- Flute Concerto (1989)

Melinda Wagner

- Concerto for Flute, Strings, and Percussion (Pulitzer Prize winner 1999)

Mieczysław Weinberg

- Flute Concerto No. 1, op. 75 (1961)
- Flute Concerto No. 2, op. 148 (1987)

Huw Watkins

- Flute Concerto

Herbert Willi

- Flute Concerto

John Williams

- Concerto for Flute and Orchestra (1969)

Charles Wuorinen

- Chamber Concerto for Flute and 10 Players

Isang Yun

- Flute Concerto

Zhou Tian

- Concerto for Flute and Orchestra (2022)

Ellen Taaffe Zwilich

- Concerto for Flute and Orchestra (1989)
- Concerto Elegia for Flute and Strings (2015)
