= List of compositions by Anton Reicha =

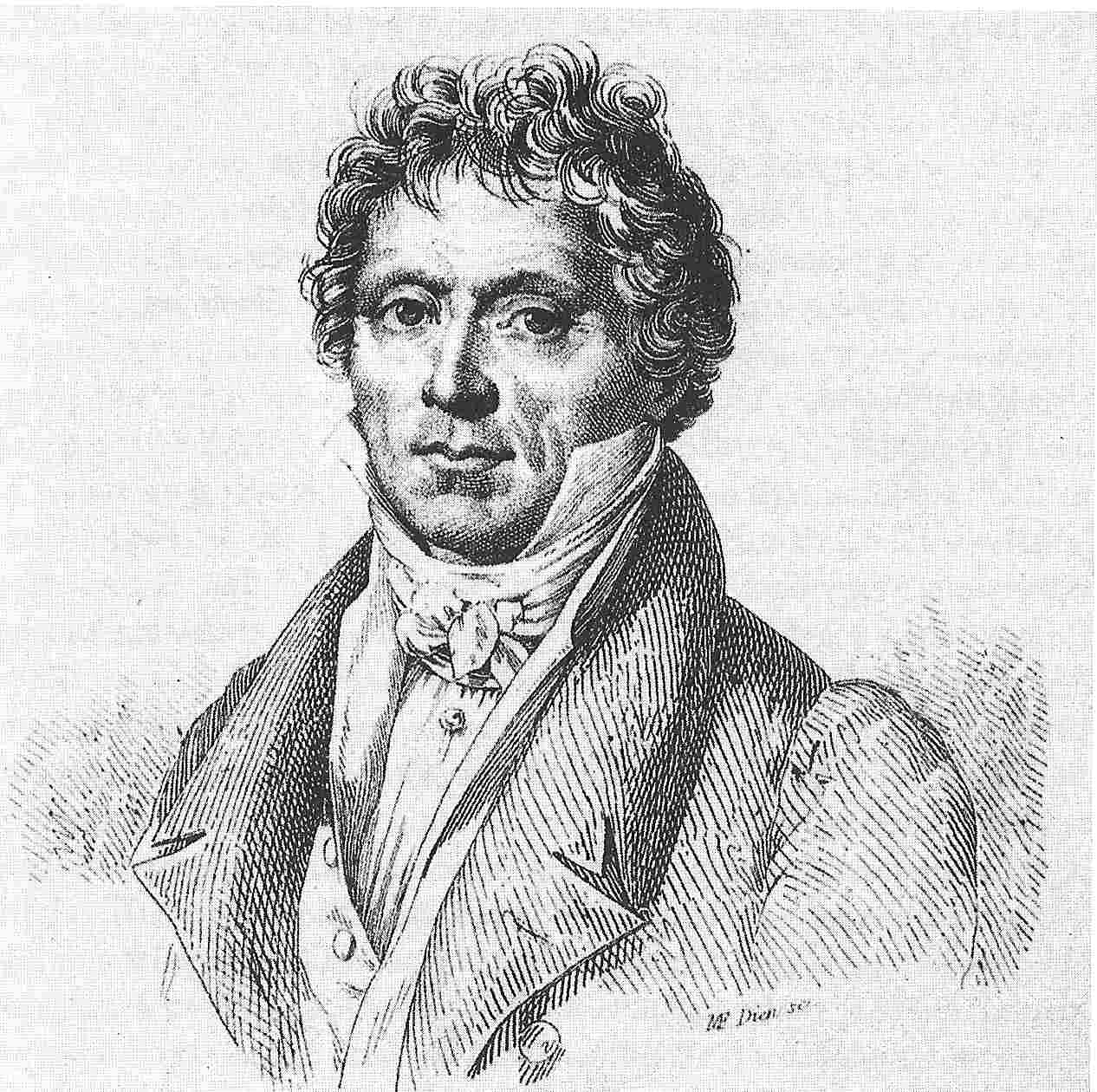
Anton Reicha, 1815

This article lists compositions by Anton Reicha. At present there exists no definitive catalogue of the composer's works, and his music, for the most part, has yet to be studied by scholars. Two principal work lists exist: one by Olga Šotolová in her book Antonín Rejcha: A Biography and Thematic Catalogue and another by Peter Eliot Stone in his article for the Grove Dictionary of Music and Musicians. The former list contains a number of errors; these were corrected by Stone in his list.

The present article contains two overlapping lists derived from Stone, several editions of Reicha's music and a number of library catalogues listed in the References and Notes section. The first list presents only works that were published and assigned opus numbers by Reicha's publishers. These numbers, as is usual, follow the order in which the works were published, rather than the order in which they were composed. The second list is organized by genre. Compositions are sorted chronologically; those with composition and publication dates unknown are listed last. Not included in either lists are works currently considered lost, fragments, and works for which details other than title are unknown. Dates of publication and/or composition are given in parentheses where known.

== List of works with opus numbers ==
- Opus 1: Six Duos for violin and cello (c. 1796–8) (possibly by Josef Reicha)
  - Number also used for a concertante for two violins, also a work possibly composed by Josef Reicha
- Opus 3: Three Duos for violin and cello (c. 1795)
- Opus 4: Three Duos for violin and cello (G major, D major, D major) (c. 1798) (possibly by Josef Reicha)
- Opus 12: Sinfonica for four flutes in D major (published by Hoffmeister in Leipzig)
- Opus 18: Harmonique imitée or three Adagios for four flutes
- Opus 19: Sonata for four flutes
- Opus 20: Variations for two flutes
- Opus 21: Three Romances for two flutes (E minor, G major, D major)
- Opus 22: 12 Little Duos for two flutes
- Opus 23: Différentes pièces for piano (c. 1796–8)
- Opus 24: Overture (Předehra) for strings, wind instruments and timpani in C major (c. 1795)
- Opus 25: Eight Duos for two flutes
- Opus 26: Trio for three flutes
- Opus 27: Quartet for four flutes
- Opus 30: Etudes ou Exercices for piano, these include exercises 2, 9, 23 and 24 from Practische Beispiele
- Opus 31: Etude de transitions and 2 fantasies for piano (Paris, 1802)
- Opus 32: Fugue on a theme by Domenico Scarlatti, for piano (Paris, 1802)
- Opus 34: Overture in E major/minor (after 1813)
- Opus 36: 36 Fugues for piano (Vienna, 1803) = includes Op. 32 as Fugue No. 9, a Fantasia from Op. 31, Etude No. 9 from Op. 30, exercises 10 and 22 from Practische Beispiele and "12 Fugues" of 1799 (no opus number). The opus number is sometimes not assigned to this work.
- Opus 40: Sonata for piano in E major (Leipzig, 1803)
- Opus 41: Symphony à grand orchestre in E♭ major ("First Symphony") (Leipzig, 1803)
- Opus 42: Symphony à grand orchestre in E♭ major (Leipzig, 1803)
- Opus 43: Sonata for piano in E♭ major (Leipzig, 1804)
- Opus 44: Sonata for piano and violin in C major (Leipzig, 1804)
- Opus 45: Three Duos for two violins (A major, D major, B♭ major) (Leipzig, 1804)
- Opus 46: Three Sonatas for piano (G major, B♭ major, E major) (Leipzig, 1804)
- Opus 47: Sonata for piano, violin and cello in C major (Leipzig, 1804)
- Opus 48: Three String Quartets (C major, G major, E♭ major) (Leipzig, 1804)
- Opus 49: Three String Quartets (C minor, D major, B♭ major) (Leipzig, c. 1804–5)
- Opus 51: Eighteen Variations and a Fantasy on a theme by Mozart for flute, violin and cello (Leipzig, 1804)
- Opus 52: String Quartet in C major (published by Breitkopf und Härtel in Leipzig, c. 1804–5, republished 2006 by Merton Music)
- Opus 53: Grand Duo for two violins in C major (Leipzig, c. 1804–5)
- Opus 54: Sonata for flute and piano in G major (Leipzig, 1804-5)
- Opus 55: Two Sonatas for violin and piano (B♭ major, E♭ major) (Leipzig, 1804-5)
- Opus 56: Urians Reise um die Welt, for two voices in unison and piano
- Opus 57: L'art de varier for piano
- Opus 58: String Quartet in A major (republished 2006 by Merton Music)
- Opus 59: Two Fantasies for piano (C major, F major)
- Opus 61: Fantasy for piano in C minor, exercise 13 from Practische Beispiele
- Opus 62: Sonata in A major for violin and piano (Leipzig, 1808)
- Opus 81: Six Fugues for piano (published by Pleyel in Paris, 1810)
- Opus 82: Twenty-Four Trios for three horns/two horns and bassoon (before 1815)
- Opus 83: Variations for piano (Paris, before 1815)
- Opus 84: Twelve Duos for violin and cello (Paris, c. 1814)
- Opus 85: Variations on Charmante Gabrielle for piano (Paris, before 1815)
- Opus 86: La victoire (Allegro brillant) for piano (Paris, before 1815)
- Opus 87: Variations on a theme by Gluck for piano
- Opus 88: Six Wind Quintets (E minor, E♭ major, G major, D minor, B♭ major, F major) (Paris, 1817)
- Opus 89: Quintet for clarinet and string quartet in B♭ major (Paris, c. 1820)
- Opus 90: Six String Quartets (E♭ major, G major, C major, E minor, F major and D major) (Paris, 1819)
- Opus 91: Six Wind Quintets (C major, A minor, D major, G minor, A major, C minor) (Paris, c. 1817-19)
- Opus 93: Twelve Trios for two horns in Eb and bassoon (Paris, c. 1820)
- Opus 94: Three String Quartets (Paris, 1824)
- Opus 95: Three String Quartets (Paris, 1824)
- Opus 96: Octet for two violins, viola, cello, oboe or flute, clarinet, horn and bassoon in E♭ major (Paris, 1820)
- Opus 97: Etudes dans le genre fugué for piano (La fugue et le contrepoint, 34 études de fugues et contrepoint) (c. 1815-17)
- Opus 98: Six Quartets for flute, violin, viola and cello (Paris, before 1815)
- Opus 99: Six Wind Quintets (C major, F minor, F major, D major, B minor, G major) (Paris, 1819)
- Opus 100: Six Wind Quintets (F major, D minor, E♭ major, E minor, A minor, B♭ major) (Paris, 1820)
- Opus 101: Six Trios Concertants for piano, violin and cello (E♭ major, D minor, C major, F major, D major, A major) (Paris, 1824)
- Opus 102: Etudes de piano ou 57 variations sur un theme, suivies d’un rondeau, variations on a theme by Grétry and a rondeau for piano (Paris, c. 1820)
- Opus 103: Grand duo concertant, duo for flute and piano in D major (Paris, 1824)
- Opus 104: Grand quatuor concertant, quartet for piano, violin or flute, bassoon or cello, and cello in E♭ major (Paris, 1824)
- Opus 105: Quintet for flute and string quartet in A major (published by Breitkopf und Härtel, Paris, 1829)
- Opus 106: Quintet for horn and string quartet in E major (published by Breitkopf und Härtel, Paris, 1829)
- Opus 107: Quintet for oboe or clarinet and string quartet in F major (Paris, 1829)

== List of works by genre ==
=== Orchestral music ===
==== Symphonies ====
- Symphony à grand orchestre ("First Symphony") in E♭ major, Op. 41 (Leipzig, 1803)
- Symphony à grand orchestre in E♭ major, Op. 42 (Leipzig, 1803)
- Symphony No. 1 in G major (completed c. 1808)
- Symphony No. 2 in D major (completed c. 1808) (lost: only 2nd bassoon part of opening adagio survives)
- Symphony No. 3 in F major (completed c. 1808)
- Symphony ("Grande symphonie No. 2") (completed c. 1808)
- Symphony in D major ("Sinfonie à grand orchestre") (completed c. 1809)
- Symphony à grand orchestre No. 1 (1809)
- Symphony à grand orchestre No. 2 (1811)
- Symphony à petit orchestre No. 1 in C minor
- Symphony in E major
- Symphony in F minor

==== Concertos ====
- Piano Concerto No. 1 in E♭ major (1804)
- Violin Concerto in E major
- Cello Concerto dedicated to de Jacques-Michel Hurel de Lamare (1803/1823)
- Cello Concerto in D major (performed before 1789 or between 1812 and 1814) (possibly by Josef Reicha)
- Cello Concerto in D♯ major (possibly by Josef Reicha)
- Grand Concerto in G minor for Clarinet and Orchestra (c. 1815)

==== Overtures ====
- Overture in C major, Op. 24 (c. 1795)
- Overture d'un concert ou d'une académie de la musique in D major (c. 1803–23)
- Overture en l'honneur de l'Impératrice Marie Thérèse (c. 1805) (spurious)
- Overture in C major (before 1810), originally for Cagliostro (see Theatrical works)
- Overture in C major (before 1822), originally for Sapho (see Theatrical works)
- Overture in E major/minor, Op. 34 (after 1813)
- Overture in D major (c. 1823)
- Overture (Symphony) in C major (before 1824)
- Overture in D major (c. 1824)
- Overture in E♭ major (c. 1824)
- Overture in E♭ major (c. 1824)
- Overture in C major (c. 1825)

==== Miscellaneous works for orchestra ====
- Grand solo for glass harmonica and orchestra (1806)
- Concertante for two violins and orchestra (c. 1807)
- Musique pour célébrer la mémoire des grands hommes, qui sont illustrés au service de la Nation française for military band (c. 1809-1815)
- Scène for English horn and orchestra (1811)
- Introduction and Rondo for horn and orchestra (1820)
- Two Solos for horn [and orchestra] (1823)
- Befiehl du deine Wege for strings (?)
- Andante varié for flute and orchestra
- Grand duo concertant for piano, violin and orchestra
- Concertante for flute, violin and orchestra in G major
- Concertante for two violins and orchestra, Op. 1 (possibly by Josef Reicha)
- Mesdemoiselles, voulez-vous danser?, air for orchestra
- Rondo del Sigre A. Reicha for small orchestra
- Variations on a theme of Dittersdorf for clarinet and orchestra

=== Chamber music ===
==== Works for wind instruments ====
- Quartet for four flutes in D major, Op. 12
- Harmonique imitée or three Adagios for four flutes, Op. 18
- Sonata for four flutes, Op. 19
- Variations for two flutes, Op. 20
- Three Romances for two flutes (E minor, G major, D major), Op. 21
- 12 Little Duos for two flutes, Op. 22
- Eight Duos for two flutes, Op. 25
- Trio for three flutes, Op. 26
- Quartet for four flutes, Op. 27
- Sonata for four flutes (possibly Op. 19) (c. 1797)
- Twenty-Four Trios for three horns/two horns and bassoon, Op. 82 (before 1815)
- Concertante for flute, oboe, clarinet, bassoon and horn (c. 1817, performed 1819)
- Andante arioso, Andante and Adagio (E♭ major, F major and D minor respectively) for English horn, flute, clarinet, bassoon and horn (1817–19)
- Six Wind Quintets (E minor, E♭ major, G major, D minor, B♭ major, F major), Op. 88 (Paris, 1817)
- Six Wind Quintets (C major, A minor, D major, G minor, A major, C minor), Op. 91 (Paris, c. 1817-19)
- Six Wind Quintets (C major, F minor, F major, D major, B minor, G major), Op. 99 (Paris, 1819)
- Six Wind Quintets (F major, D minor, E♭ major, E minor, A minor, B♭ major), Op. 100 (Paris, 1820)
- Four movements for wind quintet [Wind Quintet No. 25] in F minor (before 1826, possibly 1811)

==== Works for strings ====
- Six Duos for violin and cello, Op. 1 (c. 1796) (possibly by Josef Reicha)
- Three Duos for violin and cello, Op. 3 (c. 1796-8) (possibly by Josef Reicha)
- Four Duos for violin and cello (G major, D major, D major), Op. 4 (c. 1798) (possibly by Josef Reicha)
- Six String Quartets (E♭ major, G major, C major, E minor, F major and D major), Op. 90 (Paris, 1819)
- Three String Quartets, Op. 94 (Paris, 1824)
- Three String Quartets, Op. 95 (Paris, 1824)
- Three Duos for two violins (A major, D major, B♭ major), Op. 45 (Leipzig, 1804)
- Three String Quartets (C major, G major, E♭ major), Op. 48 (Leipzig, 1804)
- Three String Quartets (C minor, D major, B♭ major), Op. 49 (Leipzig, c. 1804–5)
- String Quartet in C major, Op. 52 (Leipzig, c. 1804–5)
- Grand Duo for two violins in C major, Op. 53 (Leipzig, c. 1804–5)
- String Quartet in A major, Op. 58 (Leipzig, c. 1804–5)
- Variations on a Russian theme for cello and string quartet (1805)
- Six Quintets; 1-2 for cello and string quartet, 3-6 for viola and string quartet (c. 1805-7)
- Three String Quintets (for string quartet and viola) (F major, D major, E♭ major), Op. 92 (Vienna, 1820)
- La pantomime, fantasia for string quartet (1806)
- String Quartet Quatuor scientifique, (c. 1806) - contains fugues nos. 3, 4 and 7 from Op. 36
- Quintet for cello and string quartet in E major (1807)
- Trio for three cellos (1807)
- Trio for violin, viola and cello in F major
- Twelve Duos for violin and cello, Op. 84 (Paris, c. 1814)
- Ouverture générale pour les séances des quatuors for string quartet (1816)
- Harmonie retrograde à 4 and Marche funèbre for string quartet (before 1824)
- Four Fugues and Variations for string quartet (?) (before 1826)
- Fugue à 2 sujets en contrepoint à la 12ième for string quartet in A minor/C major (before 1826)
- Canon for violin, viola and cello (1833)
- Armonia al revescio for string quartet (?) (1834)
- Six Duos for two violins (possibly Op. 1)
- Five/Six String Trios

==== Works for wind and string instruments ====
- Eighteen Variations and a Fantasy on a theme by Mozart for flute, violin and cello, Op. 51 (Leipzig, 1804)
- Quintet for clarinet and string quartet in B♭ major, Op. 89 (Paris, c. 1820)
- Twelve Trios for two horns and bassoon or cello, Op. 93 (Paris, c. 1820)
- Six Quartets for flute, violin, viola and cello, Op. 98 (Paris, before 1815)
- Grand Trio for flute, violin and cello (Vienna, before 1815)
- Octet for two violins, viola, cello, oboe or flute, clarinet, horn and bassoon in E♭ major, Op. 96 (Paris, 1820)
- Quintet for oboe or clarinet and string quartet in F major, Op. 107 (Paris, 1829)
- Quintet for flute and string quartet in A major, Op. 105 (Paris, 1829)
- Quintet for horn and string quartet in E major, Op. 106 (Paris, 1829)
- Grande symphonie de salon for oboe, clarinet, bassoon, horn, string quartet and double bass (c. 1825)
- Quintet for bassoon and string quartet (1826)
- Grande symphonie de salon No. 1 in D major for flute, oboe, clarinet, bassoon, horn, string quartet and double bass (c. 1827)
- Grande symphonie de salon No. 2 in E minor for flute, oboe, clarinet, bassoon, horn, string quartet and double bass (c. 1827)
- Diecetto for flute, oboe, clarinet, bassoon, horn, string quartet and double bass in A major (c. 1827-8) (possibly one of the Grande symphonies de salon)
- Quintet [No. 4] for flute, clarinet, bassoon, horn and viola in E♭ major
- Two Quartets for flute, violin, viola and cello (possibly from Op. 98)
- Variations for bassoon and string quartet
- Grand duo concertant for clarinet in B♭, clarinet in A and string quartet (castejon-music-editions)
- Double Quartet for flute, oboe, clarinet, bassoon and string quartet (unrealized polytonal work)

==== Chamber music with piano ====
- Rondeau for violin and piano (c. 1800)
- Sonata for piano, violin and cello in C major, Op. 47 (Leipzig, 1804)
- Sonata for piano and violin in C major, Op. 44 (Leipzig, 1804)
- Sonata for flute and piano in G major, Op. 54 (Leipzig, 1804-5)
- Two Sonatas for violin and piano (B♭ major, E♭ major), Op. 55 (Leipzig, 1804-5)
- Sonata in A major for violin and piano, Op. 62 (Leipzig, 1808)
- Quintet for 2 violins, viola, viola/cello (?) and glass harmonica (c. 1806)
- Duo for bassoon and piano in B♭ major (c. 1810–15)
- Solo for horn and piano in E minor (c. 1810–15)
- Grand duo concertant, duo for flute and piano in D major, Op. 103 (Paris, 1824)
- Grand quatuor concertant, quartet for piano, violin or flute, bassoon or cello, and cello in E♭ major, Op. 104 (Paris, 1824)
- Six Trios Concertants for piano, violin and cello (E♭ major, D minor, C major, F major, D major, A major), Op. 101 (Paris, 1824)
- Grand Trio [No. 6] for violin, cello and piano (1824)
- Grand duo concertant for violin and piano in A major (1826)
- Piano Quintet (1826)
- Twelve Sonatas for violin and piano
- Adagio from a violin concerto, arranged for violin and piano
- Trio for violin, cello and piano

=== Works for organ ===
- Fugue in A major

=== Works for piano solo ===
- Différentes pièces, Op. 23 (c. 1796–8)
- Rondos and a Fantasia (c. 1796–8)
- Twelve Fugues (Paris, 1800–01)
- Etudes ou Exercices, Op. 30 (Paris, c. 1800-01) (includes exercises 2, 9, 23 and 24 from Practische Beispiele)
- Etude de transitions and 2 fantasies, Op. 31 (Paris, 1802)
- Fugue on a theme by Domenico Scarlatti, Op. 32 (Paris, 1802)
- 36 Fugues (Vienna, 1803) (includes Op. 32 as Fugue No. 9, a Fantasia from Op. 31, Etude No. 9 from Op. 30, exercises 10 and 22 from Practische Beispiele and "12 Fugues" of 1799 (no opus number). The opus number 36 is sometimes assigned to this work.)
- Sonata in E major, Op. 40 (Leipzig, 1803)
- L'art de varier, Op. 57 (Leipzig, c. 1803–4)
- Sonata in E♭ major, Op. 43 (Leipzig, 1804)
- Three Sonatas (G major, B♭ major, E major), Op. 46 (Leipzig, 1804)
- Sonata in E♭ (c. 1804-5)
- Two Fantasies (C major, F major), Op. 59 (Leipzig, 1805)
- Fantasy in C minor, exercise 13 from Practische Beispiele, Op. 61 (Leipzig, 1807)
- Six Fugues, Op. 81 (Paris, 1810)
- Variations, Op. 83 (Paris, before 1815)
- Variations on Charmante Gabrielle, Op. 85 (Paris, before 1815)
- La victoire (Allegro brillant), Op. 86 (Paris, before 1815)
- Variations on a theme by Gluck, Op. 87 (Paris, before 1815)
- L’enharmonique, piece no. 16 from Op. 97 (c. 1815)
- Etudes dans le genre fugué, Op. 97 (La fugue et le contrepoint, 34 études de fugues et contrepoint) (c. 1815-17)
- Fugue analysée sous le rapport de l’harmonie, in Cours de composition musicale (before 1818)
- Etudes de piano ou 57 variations sur un theme, suivies d’un rondeau, variations on a theme by Grétry and a rondeau, Op. 102 (Paris, c. 1820)
- Allegretto in A major (1822)
- Harmonie retrograde (1825)
- Fugue à 3 dans le style moderne (before 1826)

In addition, a number of undated pieces are known, among which are untitled pieces, sonata movements and the following titled works:

- Air de ballet
- Allegretto
- Andante varié
- Andantino
- Capriccio
- Fantaisie sur l'harmonie précédente, 5 fantasias
- Fantaisie sur un seul accord ("Fantasy on a single chord")
- Fantasia on a theme by Frescobaldi
- La chercheuse d'esprit, arr. of 13 Fr. 16th-century ariettas
- L'espiègle
- Marche funèbre
- Marche funèbre, from "Musique pour célébrer.." (see Miscellaneous works for orchestra)
- Prelude in E♭ major
- Three Rondos
- Sonate facile (La pastorale)
- Sonata in F major (Variations on a theme by Mozart)
- Six Sonatas
- Variations in E♭ major

=== Vocal music ===
==== Theatrical ====
- Godefroid de Montfort (c. 1794-96)
- Obaldi, ou Les français en Egypte (before 1798)
- Amor, der Joujou-Spieler, singspiel (before 1800)
- Rosalia, singspiel (before 1800)
- L'ouragan (c. 1800)
- Argine, regina di Granata (1802)
- Cagliostro, ou La séduction (Les illuminés) (1808–10)
- Gusman d'Alfarache (after 1809)
- Bégri ou Le chanteur à Constantinople (after c. 1809)
- Natalie ou La famille russe (c. 1810-12)
- Olinde et Sophronie (1819)
- Philoctète (1822) (only three choruses survive)
- Sapho (1822)
- Gioas, re di Giuda (before 1826) (survives incomplete)

==== Choral ====
===== With orchestra =====
- Lenore, cantata (c. 1805)
- Der neue Psalm, cantata (1807)
- Missa pro defunctis (Requiem) (after 1809)
- Hommage à Grétry, cantata (1814)
- Choeur dialogué par les instruments à vent in E♭ major (before 1924)
- Te Deum for chorus, organ and orchestra (1825)
- Die Harmonie der Sphären ("Horch, wie orgelt") (before 1826)
- Le peuple saint for chorus, organ and orchestra (before 1826)
- Fugue in D major (before 1826)
- Fugue in F major (before 1826)
- Double Fugue in E minor (before 1826)
- Cum sanctis tuis in aeternum (before 1826)
- Dona nobis pacem (before 1826)

===== With keyboard =====
- Urians Reise um die Welt for voices in unison and piano, Op. 56 (Vienna, c. 1804)
- Do-do, l’enfant do for soprano soloist, chorus and piano/harpsichord (after 1810)
- Regina coeli for double chorus, organ and basso continuo (before 1818)
- Fugue for 8 voices, organ and basso continuo in G minor (1822)
- Fugue for double chorus, organ and basso continuo in E minor (before 1824)
- Prière for chorus and organ (before 1826)
- Sonetto: Hymnus an den Karfunkel, for soloists, chorus and piano

===== Unaccompanied =====
- Das lacedämonische Lied ("Einst fühlen wir"), fugue for four male voices (1805)
- Je prends mon bien partout, canon for four voices (Paris, c. 1823)
- Duo dans le style rigoureux, duo for SATB chorus in E♭ major
- Fugue for four voices in F major (before 1826)
- Fugue for four voices in E♭ major (before 1826)
- Fugue for double chorus
- Cantique for four soloists and double chorus (possibly the Hommage à Grétry)

==== Music for solo voices ====
===== With orchestra =====
- Donne, donne, chi vi crede, cavatina for soprano soloist and orchestra (c. 1786–94)
- Basta ti credo … Quanto e fiero, recit and aria for soloist and orchestra (c. 1800)
- Abschied der Johanna d'Arc, melodrama for soloist, glass harmonica and orchestra (1806)
- Aure amiche ah non spirate, scena and aria for soprano soloist and orchestra (c. 1810)
- Prelude for tenor soloist and orchestra (before 1826)
- Voici le moment favorable for five soloists and orchestra (possibly a fragment of an opera)

===== Without orchestra =====
- Quel est, hélas! la tourmente que j’endure!, romance for voice and piano (Paris, c. 1800)
- Das Andenken (Matthison) for soprano soloist and piano (c. 1801–9)
- Der Brüder Graürock und die Pilgerin, cantata (?) for soprano soloist and piano (c. 1801–9)
- Die Sehnsucht for voice and piano (Vienna, c. 1817, but probably composed c. 1809)
- Hamlets Monolog ("Sein oder nicht sein") for voice and piano (Leipzig, c. 1810)
- Air for soprano soloist or oboe and piano (before 1818)
- Je vais cherchant pour rencontrer un coeur for voice and piano/harpsichord (Paris, c. 1822)
- Voi sole o luci belle, canon for two soloists and basso continuo (before 1824)
- Das Grab (Salis) for voice and piano
- Fra mille vari moti for four soloists, double bass ad lib and basso continuo (Paris, c. 1827)
- Circé, cantata for soprano soloist and piano
- 12 Gesänge, songs for voice and piano

=== Other works ===
- Scènes italiennes (1787) (mentioned in Reicha's autobiography; apparently a collection of vocal music. Contents unknown, possibly some of the surviving pieces were included.
- Canons (1804)
- Canon à 3 on the air "Charmante Gabrielle" (before 1824)
- Canon à 6 (1824)
- Fugue à 3 octaves (before 1826)
- Ressources harmoniques (1835)
- Canon à 4 voix
- miscellaneous sketches, fragments; ariettas mentioned in the autobiography, etc.
