= Friedrich Berr =

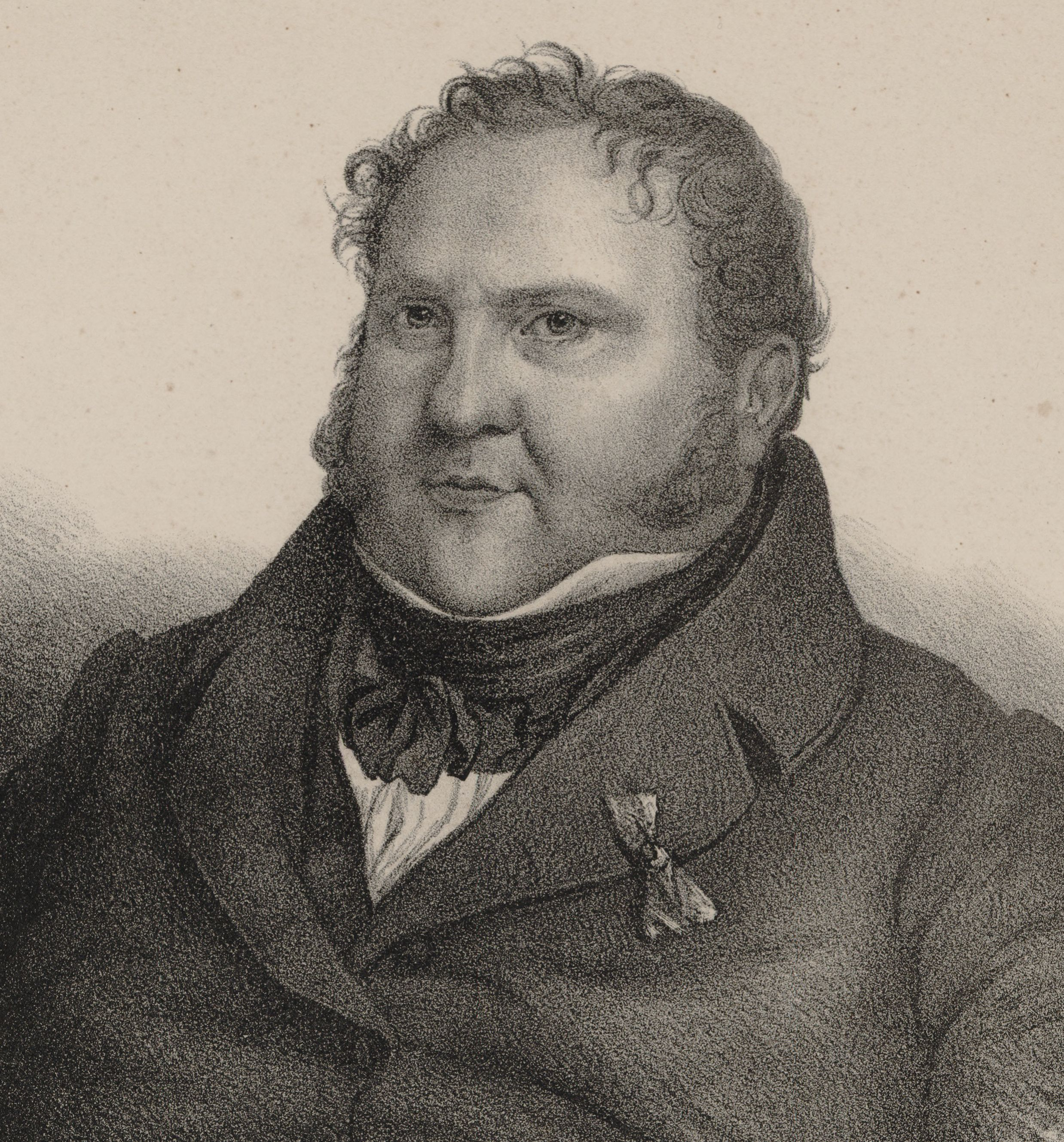

Friedrich Berr, born with the name Friedrich Beer, (April 17, 1794, Mannheim – Sept 24, 1838, Paris, France) was a German clarinetist, bassoonist, composer, and music educator. He studied music composition with François-Joseph Fétis in Douai, Hauts-de-France and with Anton Reicha in Paris. He changed his last name to Berr in order to avoid confusion with the clarinetist Joseph Beer. In 1823 he was appointed principal clarinetist at the Théâtre du Vaudeville, and he later held the same position in the orchestra of the Théâtre Royal Italien from 1825 to 1838. He also worked as solo clarinetist to King Louis Philippe I and taught at the Paris Conservatoire from 1831 to 1836. In 1833 he was named a Knight of the Légion d’Honneur.

The New Grove Dictionary of Music and Musicians stated that Berr "had a profound influence on French clarinet playing, introducing German ideals of tone and advocating playing with the reed on the lower lip." He also wrote a methods book for the bassoon; the instrument with which he began his career in the 1810s as a member of a band within a French infantry regiment. As a composer the majority of his music was written for military bands; although he also wrote several compositions for solo instruments.
