= Milan Langer =

Czech pianist

Milan Langer (born in Prague, 1955) is a Czech pianist.

He won Smetana Competition and the Chopin Competition in Mariánské Lázně, and was prized at the 1976 Paloma O'Shea Competition. Langer is best known for his work as a member of the Czech Trio (1994- ) and his recordings for Supraphon on the Czech pre-romantic repertory, such as Václav Tomášek's Eclogues and Antonín Rejcha's fugues.

Langer is the head of the Prague Conservatory's piano department.
