= 24 Horn Trios (Reicha) =

24 Horn Trios, Op. 82 is a collection of horn trios composed by Anton Reicha. The trios are scored for 3 horns or 2 horns and a bassoon. The work was published in Paris before 1815 (the exact date of publication is unknown) and is well established in the horn repertoire today.

Reicha was a flautist in his youth and composed a large number of works for wind instruments, among which were duos, trios and quartets for wind ensembles. Compositions for several identical instruments were apparently a particular favorite, as witnessed by, for example, flute quartets Op. 12 and Op. 27, or Variations for two flutes Op. 20. The trios of Op. 82 are part of this trend, and also reflect Reicha's interest in pedagogy, as well as his affinity for counterpoint. The collection is divided into four parts, six trios each. Numerous genres and forms are represented: there are canonic trios and a full-fledged fugue, a set of variations, dances such as minuet and musette, character pieces and short technical exercises or jokes such as Trio No. 15, subtitled Tritonus, in which the upper voice is restricted to using only the three tones.

== List of trios ==
- 1er Livraison:
  - Trio No. 1, Tempo di Minuetto
  - Trio No. 2, Musétte. Allegro
  - Trio No. 3, Adagio
  - Trio No. 4, Menuetto. Trio
  - Trio No. 5, Introduction. Adagio. Allegro
  - Trio No. 6, Canon à 3. Tempo di minuetto
- 2ème Livraison:
  - Trio No. 7, Variations on the air Charmante Gabrielle. Andante. Variations 1–4
  - Trio No. 8, Canon à 2. Andante
  - Trio No. 9, Rondeau. Allegro
  - Trio No. 10, Allegro
  - Trio No. 11, Allegro
  - Trio No. 12, Menuetto. Moderato assai. Trio
- 3ème Livraison:
  - Trio No. 13, Allegro
  - Trio No. 14, Menuetto. Allegro assai. Trio
  - Trio No. 15, Tritonus. Allegretto
  - Trio No. 16, Mouvement de Marche
  - Trio No. 17, Lento. Allegro
  - Trio No. 18, Fugue. Allegro
- 4ème Livraison:
  - Trio No. 19, Lento
  - Trio No. 20, Contrepoint double à l'Octave. Allegretto
  - Trio No. 21, Allegro
  - Trio No. 22, Lento sostenuto. Allegro spiritoso
  - Trio No. 23, Menuetto grazioso. Trio
  - Trio No. 24, Finale. Allegro scherzando

== Recordings ==
- Antonín Reicha: Trios for French Horns, Op. 82 (recorded 1988, released 1991). Zdeněk Tylšar, Bedřich Tylšar, Zdeněk Divoký (horns). Supraphon 11 1446-2
- Anton Reicha: 24 Trios pour trois cors, Op. 82 (1999). Deutsche Naturhorn Solisten (horns). DG, catalogue number MDG 605 0864-2

== See also ==
- List of compositions by Anton Reicha
- List of compositions for horn
