= Flute Concerto (Fétis) =

1869 Concerto by Joseph-François Fétis

The Flute Concerto in B minor was composed by musicologist and composer François-Joseph Fétis in 1869, when he was 85 years of age and two years before his death. The concerto was written specifically for the Böhm flute, analogous to the standard concert-styled flute found in contemporary Western orchestras. The work features a highly florid flute section, a rather uncommon phenomenon at the time as the flute was both a new instrument in France and seen as more so a background instrument in late-19th century orchestration. Thus, the fact that it plays a leading role makes this concerto a rarity and one of the early examples of the flute gaining a serious presence as a solo instrument.

The concerto originally featured an extended cadenza included with movement three, although no such documentation survives in the present.

== Form ==
The concerto utilizes the typical structure for a concerto, consisting of three movements which features a lively beginning, a slower middle section, before returning to the first movement's tempo.

1. Allegro
2. Adagio
3. Allegro ma non troppo
