= 36 Fugues (Reicha) =

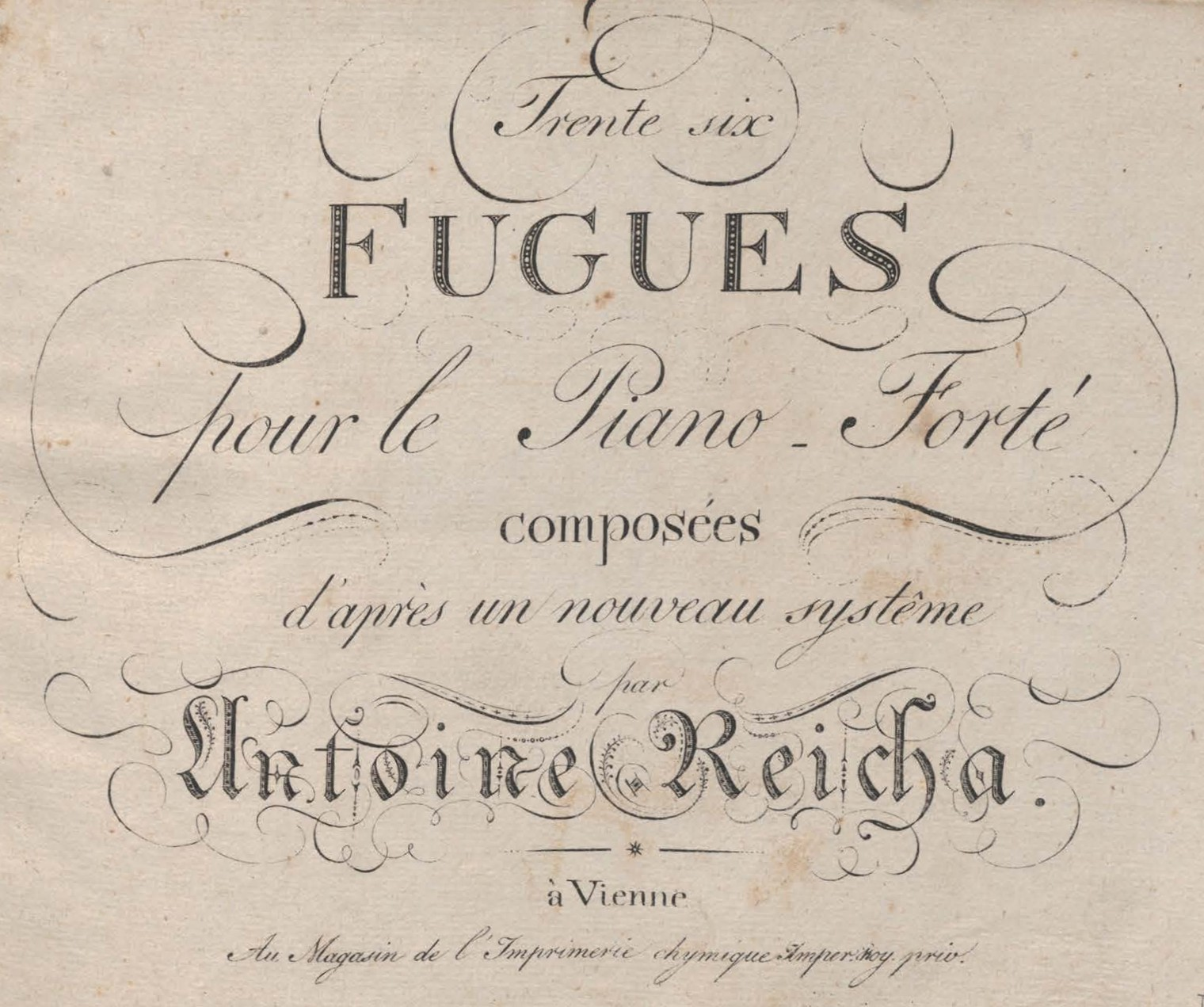
Cover of the 1805 edition of 36 Fugues.

36 Fugues, sometimes assigned opus number 36, is a cycle of fugues for piano composed by Anton Reicha. It was first published by the composer in 1803 and served as an illustration of a nouveau système (Fr. "new system") Reicha invented for fugue composition. This system involved, among other things, extensive use of polyrhythms, derived from traditional music, and fugal answers on any and all scale degrees, rather than just the dominant, which was standard at the time.

== Historical background ==
Reicha most probably started composing the fugues during his short stay in Hamburg. In 1799 he moved to Paris and soon published a collection of twelve fugues there, all of which were subsequently included in 36 Fugues (as numbers 1, 2, 4, 8, 20–23, 25–27 and 35). By 1802 Reicha moved to Vienna, but the same year two more works that would later be included in the collection were published in Paris. These were a fantaisie from Etude de transitions et 2 fantaisies, Op. 31, and a fugue on a theme by Domenico Scarlatti, Op. 32.

The complete cycle was published in 1803 in Vienna under the French title Trente six fugues pour le pianoforte, composées d'après un nouveau système ("Thirty-six fugues for the piano, composed using a new system"). The collection was dedicated to Haydn, whom Reicha knew since the early 1790s, and included a dedicatory poem by Reicha, in French and German. The fugues were preceded by extensive textual notes, in which Reicha defended his methods, particularly polyrhythm, for which he cites numerous examples from traditional music of Switzerland, Alsace, Greece and western France around the Bay of Biscay.

The second edition was published in Vienna in 1805 and included a short theoretical text, Über das neue Fugensystem, in which Reicha explains the theoretical basis of the fugues in form of a polemic against the numerous opponents of his ideas. These included Ludwig van Beethoven, who dismissed Reicha's method for turning the fugue into something that is no longer a fugue ("daß die Fuge keine Fuge mehr ist"), and Robert Schumann. Also mentioned in Reicha's text are the circumstances that led to the composition of some of the fugues with borrowed themes: apparently, his Parisian friends had chosen several themes and asked Reicha to compose fugues on them using the new method.

== General information ==
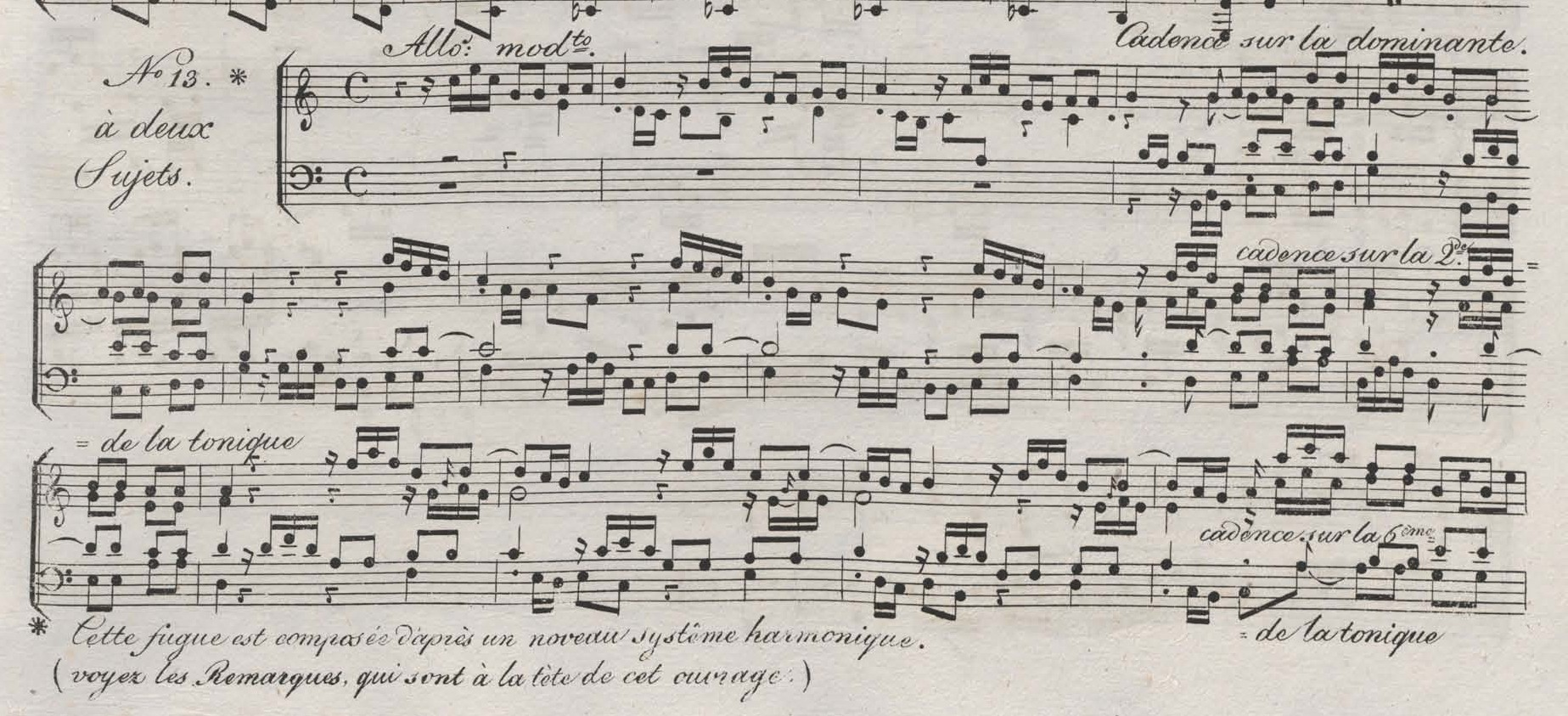
Fugue No. 13, an example of Reicha's "new harmonic system", which can provide cadences on almost all of the scale degrees, as pointed out in the score by Reicha himself.

In Über das neue Fugensystem Reicha outlines his idea of the fugue as a form. To him, the characteristics required were the following:

- the theme must appear in all voices, voices entering one by one,
- throughout the fugue the texture and character must remain properly contrapuntal,
- all musical ideas should be derived from the subject alone.

The standard rule of answering the subject at the dominant did not matter to Reicha, and he argues that any scale degree can be used (for example, the subject is answered at the tritone in Fugue No. 20). He also dismisses limitations on the nature of the fugue's subjects, such as obligatory non-periodic structure (one of the subjects of Fugue No. 18 consists of a single note repeated) and a maximum span of a ninth (the subject borrowed from Mozart, in Fugue No. 7, has a span of more than two octaves). Finally, in some fugues of the cycle, Reicha experiments with the structure of the form by adding introductory sections (Fugue No. 27) or alternating between two different forms of texture (Fugue No. 14).

Although most fugues employ a single subject, some are different: six fugues employ two subjects (nos. 4, 13, 18, 31, 32, 34), fugue number 30 has three and fugue number 15 has six. Of the 36 fugues, 6 use subjects from other composers. These are the following:

- Fugue No. 3 in F minor uses the primary theme from the first movement of Joseph Haydn's String Quartet No. 23 in F Minor, Op. 20, No. 5
- Fugue No. 5 in G major uses the subject of Johann Sebastian Bach's G major fugue from Book II of the Well-Tempered Clavier, BWV 884/2
- Fugue No. 7 in D major uses the theme that starts Mozart's Haffner Symphony, K. 385
- Fugue No. 9 in G minor uses the subject of Domenico Scarlatti's Cat's Fugue, Kk. 30/ L. 499
- Fugue No. 14, fuga-fantasia, uses the subject of Girolamo Frescobaldi's Recercar Cromatic[h]o post il credo from the second Mass of Fiori musicali, Missa Degli Apostoli.
- Fugue No. 15 is built on six subjects, one of which is a theme from Handel's oratorio Israel in Egypt, namely the line "I will sing unto the Lord" from the first chorus of the second part, "Moses and the children of Israel [...]".

== List of fugues ==
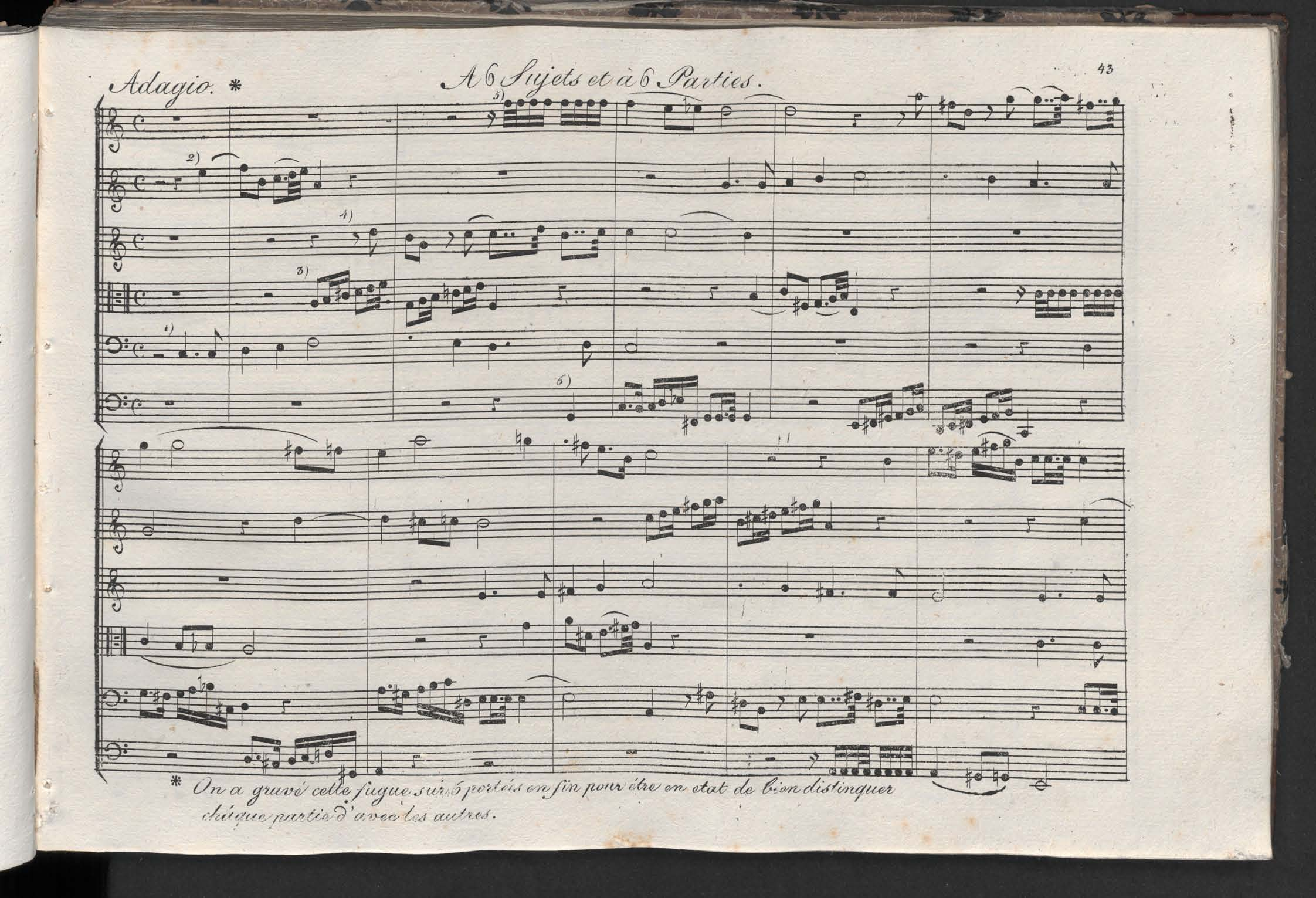
Fugue No. 15 has six subjects, and is printed twice in the 1805 edition: a version on six staves, pictured here, and a version on two staves.

- Fugue No. 1, Allegro – uses fragmentation of the subject, then sequences it chromatically.
- Fugue No. 2, Allegro
- Fugue No. 3, Molto moderato (theme by Haydn)
- Fugue No. 4, Allegro moderato – two subjects.
- Fugue No. 5, Allegretto (theme by Bach)
- Fugue No. 6, Allegro moderato
- Fugue No. 7, Allegro (theme by Mozart)
- Fugue No. 8, Allegretto, subtitled Cercle harmonique – modulates through all keys.
- Fugue No. 9, Allegro moderato (theme by Scarlatti)
- Fugue No. 10, – in 12/4 (Reicha recommends imagining this as 3/4 time, tempo di una battuta.)
- Fugue No. 11, Allegro moderato
- Fugue No. 12, Allegretto – in 2/8.
- Fugue No. 13, Allegro moderato – two subjects. Composed using Reicha's "new harmonic system"; a modal fugue with cadences possible on every degree of the scale without further alteration, except the seventh.
- Fugue No. 14, Ferme et avec majesté—Presto, subtitled Fuga-fantasia (theme by Frescobaldi) – alternates between slow chordal passages and chromatically planned fast sections.
- Fugue No. 15, Adagio – six subjects (one of them by Handel). Originally printed in both two- and six-stave form.
- Fugue No. 16, Andante un poco allegretto
- Fugue No. 17, Allegro
- Fugue No. 18, Adagio – two subjects.
- Fugue No. 19, Allegro
- Fugue No. 20, Allegretto – in 5/8.
- Fugue No. 21, Allegro
- Fugue No. 22, Allegretto
- Fugue No. 23, Allegro

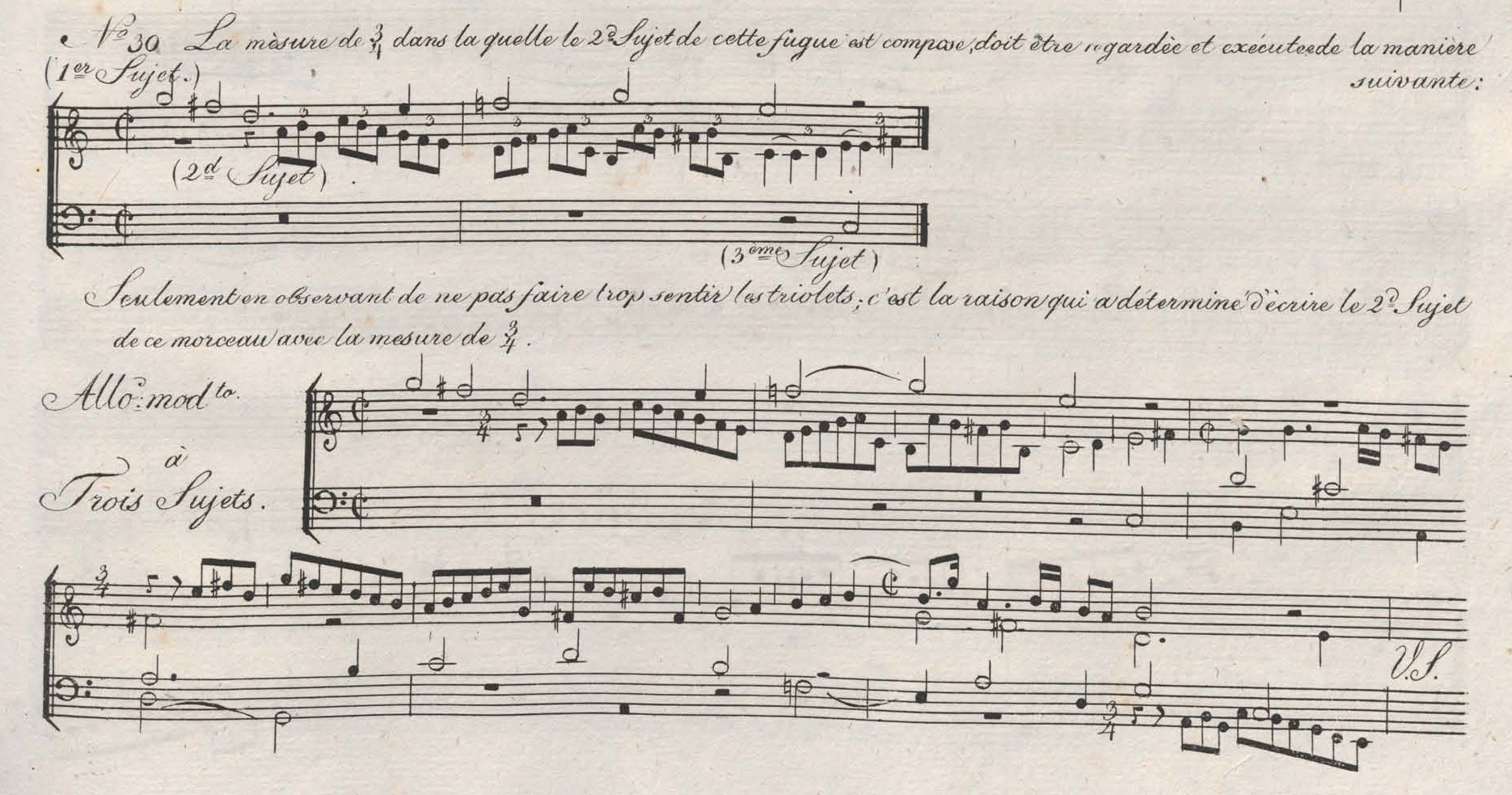
Opening bars of Fugue No. 30, with Reicha's explanation of polyrhythm.

- Fugue No. 24, Allegro moderato – 2/2 and 3/4 alternating.
- Fugue No. 25, Allegro
- Fugue No. 26, Allegro
- Fugue No. 27, Allegro – features an introductory section.
- Fugue No. 28, Allegro – 6/8 and 2/8 alternating.
- Fugue No. 29, Allegro moderato
- Fugue No. 30, Allegro moderato – three subjects. 4/2 + 3/4, used simultaneously (polyrhythm).
- Fugue No. 31, Allegro moderato
- Fugue No. 32, Poco lento
- Fugue No. 33, Allegro
- Fugue No. 34, Un poco presto – two subjects.
- Fugue No. 35, Allegro
- Fugue No. 36, Allegro moderato

== Editions ==
- Kassel: Bärenreiter, 1973, catalogue numbers 19117–119. Edited by Václav Jan Sýkora.

== Recordings ==
- 36 Fugues Op. 36 (1991–92). Tiny Wirtz (piano). 2 CDs, CPO 999 065-2
  World premiere recording of the complete cycle.
- 36 Fugues for piano, Op. 36 (selection) (1996–7). Milan Langer (piano). 1 CD, BONTON Music 71 0459-2.
  Includes fugues nos. 1, 3, 5, 7, 9, 11–13, 20, 22, 23–26, 28–33.
- 36 Fugues (2006). Jaroslav Tůma (piano). 2 CDs, ARTA F101462,
  Performed on a period instrument, fortepiano Anton Walter 1790.

== References and further reading ==
- Mellasenah Young Morris. "A Style Analysis of the Thirty-six Fugues for Piano, Opus 36, by Anton Reicha". D.M.A., Performance, Peabody Conservatory of Music, 1980. viii, 141 p.
- Peter Eliot Stone. "Reicha, Antoine", Grove Music Online, ed. L. Macy, grovemusic.com (subscription access).

== See also ==
- List of compositions by Anton Reicha
