= Flute Concerto (Reinecke) =

1908 Concerto by Carl Reinecke

The Flute Concerto in D major, Op. 283, is a composition for solo flute and orchestra by the composer Carl Reinecke. The work was composed in 1908 and was Reinecke's last concerto before his death. It was first performed on 15 March 1909 in Leipzig by the flutist Maximilian Schwedler, to whom the piece is dedicated.

== Composition ==
The concerto has a duration of roughly 20 minutes and is composed in three movements:

1. Allegro molto moderato
2. Lento e mesto
3. Moderato – In tempo animato – Tempo I – Più mosso – Più lento maestoso

=== Instrumentation ===
The work is scored for solo flute and an orchestra consisting of two additional flutes, two oboes, two clarinets, two bassoons, four horns, two trumpets, timpani, percussion, and strings.

== Reception ==
The Flute Concerto has been compared to other works of the era. Geoffrey Norris of Gramophone called it a "substantial work" and said it "makes amends for the fact that Brahms never wrote a concerto for flute." John Rockwell of The New York Times was somewhat more critical, remarking, "Reinecke's sensibility was shaped by another Leipziger, Mendelssohn, and his flute concerto seems blissfully dated for a work composed in this century. It has an undeniable craft, and the final movement especially provides virtuosic moments for the soloist. But it is no masterwork." Michael Dervan of The Irish Times similarly opined, "The prolific Carl Reinecke, conductor of the Leipzig Gewandhaus Orchestra and director of the Leipzig Conservatory, has become a one-work composer, remembered for his Undine Sonata for flute and piano, and, a lot more rarely, for the two concertos recorded here. Reinecke's 19th-century version of easy-listening lacks both the rhythmic bounce and easy harmonic flow of the 18th-century variety, let alone the cleverness of 20th-century approaches."
