= L'art de varier =

L'Art de varier ("The Art of Varying"), Op. 57, is a set of variations for piano composed by Anton Reicha. It was composed around 1803–4 and published in Leipzig. The set comprises a theme in F major and 57 variations, ranging from very easy to extremely virtuosic pieces.

The work was composed for, and dedicated to, Prince Louis Ferdinand of Prussia, a gifted musician and composer to whom Beethoven dedicated his Third Piano Concerto. Reicha's behaviour is slightly surprising, given that a few years before L'art de varier, in 1801, he rejected an invitation to become Louis Ferdinand's Kapellmeister and teacher.
