= Jeff Manookian =

American composer (1953–2021)

Jeff Manookian (November 24, 1953 – July 10, 2021) was an American pianist, composer, and conductor from Salt Lake City, Utah.

Manookian shared 1st prize in the 2017 International Piano Competition of the World Piano Teachers Association. He was a recipient of commissions by the Barlow Endowment of Brigham Young University, the Abramyan String Quartet and the National Endowment for the Arts.

Manookian had been Music Director of the Theatre Orchestra of Tucumán (Argentina), Intermountain Classical Orchestra (Salt Lake City, Utah), University of Utah Summer Arts Orchestra, Westminster Chamber Orchestra (Salt Lake City, Utah), and Artistic Director of the Oratorio Society of Utah (USA).
