= Flute Concerto (Josef Reicha) =

1781 composition by Josef Reicha

The Concerto for Flute and Orchestra was written by Josef Reicha in 1781, shortly after he went on a Grand Tour in the mid to late 1770s. Though the work was composed in 1781, far beyond the date music historians have deemed as the beginning of the classical era, it displays many characteristics of the galant musical style characteristic of the pre-classical post-Baroque music of the eighteenth century. Records do not indicate whether Reicha began composing the work while he was visiting the cosmopolitan centers of Europe but we may assume that he was indeed inspired by what he heard and saw based on the prevalence of galant musical characteristics presented throughout the work including (1) a simplistic, song-like, and clear melody, (2) short and periodic phrases, (3) a reduced harmonic vocabulary that emphasizes tonic and dominant, and (4) a clear distinction between soloist and accompaniment.
