= Flute Concerto (Kernis) =

Concerto by Aaron Jay Kernis

The Flute Concerto is a composition for flute and orchestra by the American composer Aaron Jay Kernis. The work was jointly commissioned for the flautist Marina Piccinini by the Detroit Symphony Orchestra, the Rochester Philharmonic Orchestra, the Chautauqua Institution, and the Peabody Conservatory of Music. It was first performed in Detroit on January 21, 2016, by Piccinini and the Detroit Symphony Orchestra conducted by Leonard Slatkin. The piece is dedicated to Marina Piccinini "with warmth and admiration."

== Composition ==
=== Background ===
Kernis composed the concerto specifically for the flautist Marina Piccinini and said the composition was "inspired by the beauty and elegance of her playing." Kernis conceived the piece in two halves, comprising the darker first and third movements and the lighter second and fourth movements. In the score program notes, the composer wrote, "The movements are very connected to each other musically, and share ideas between them that keeps the musical thread continuous, even with the varied feel of each movement. Some elements the movements have in common (with the possible exception of the last) is that each begins with calmly and wind up spiraling out of control in some way. Three of the movements are based around dance rhythms from centuries long past. Pastorale is a gentle dance of the land and field, Barcarolle evokes the undulating music of a gondola traveling on water, Pavan is a slow, dignified dance in double time (though I have set it in triple!), and a Tarantella is a continuously fast dance in 6/8 that often accelerates." Additionally, the fourth movement draws inspiration from the Ian Anderson-lead British rock group Jethro Tull.

=== Structure ===
The concerto has a duration of approximately 25 minutes and is cast in four movements:

1. Portrait
2. Pastorale – Barcarolle
3. Pavan
4. Taran-Tulla

=== Instrumentation ===
The work is scored for a solo flute and an orchestra consisting of two flutes (2nd doubling piccolo), two oboes (2nd doubling English horn), two clarinets (2nd doubling bass clarinet), two bassoons (2nd doubling contrabassoon), two horns, two trumpets, two trombones, tuba, timpani, three percussionists, piano (doubling celesta), harp, and strings.

== Reception ==
The concerto has been praised by music critics. Reviewing the world premiere, Mark Stryker of the Detroit Free Press said the piece "proved to be a corker" and wrote, "The concerto was more abstract, with more dissonance and density than much of Kernis' music, which tends to traffic in lush melody and easily digestible harmony. Here the dominant feeling was one of mercurial mood swings, as the flute skittered quickly between dreamy reveries, sprightly dances and intense furies. All proceeded smoothly, including a charming use of a mandolin, until the last movement Tarantella, where the drum set and 'ride' cymbal beat and rock-inspired bass lines stumbled like an awkward teen trying to dance."
