= Maximilian Schwedler =

German flutist, flute maker and music historian

Otto Maximilian Schwedler
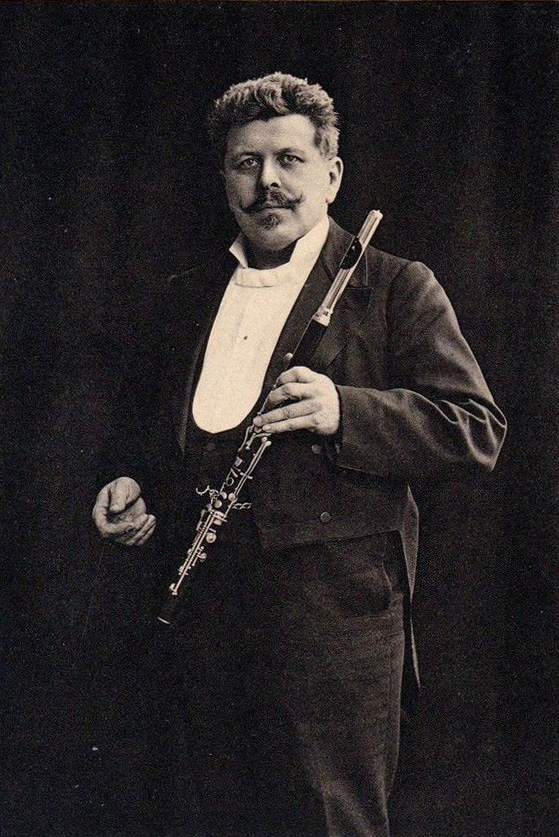

Background information
- Born: March 31, 1853; Hirschberg im Riesengebirge, Silesia
- Died: January 16, 1940 (aged 86) Leipzig, Germany
- Genres: Classical
- Occupations: Flutist; Professor; Author; Music editor
- Instrument: Flute
- Resting place: Central Cemetery, Leipzig
- Children: 2

Maximilian Schwedler (March 31, 1853 – January 16, 1940) was a German flutist, flute maker and music editor and historian. He was influential as Germany's last major advocate for the conical-bore flute, for which he made many improvements. In 1898 he received a patent for the Reformflöte "System Schwedler-Kruspe" (Modell 1898), also known as the Reform flute.

== Early life and education ==
Schwedler was born in Hirschberg im Riesengebirge, Silesia (now in Poland) to August and Selma Schröter Schwedler. He expressed an interest in music at a young age; his mother bought him a two-keyed wooden flute along with a copy of Examples for Johann Joachim Quantz's On Playing the Flute at an estate sale and he took his first lessons from a former military musician. He later studied in Dresden with the flutist Friedrich August Meinel (1827–1902).

== Career ==
From 1875 to 1881 Schwedler played at the Stadttheater Düsseldorf. In 1881 he joined the Leipzig Gewandhaus Orchestra as principal flutist and remained there until 1917. In 1886, Johannes Brahms conducted the Leipzig premiere of his Fourth Symphony, and praised Schwedler's playing of the famous fourth movement flute solo. Carl Reinecke's Flute Concerto op. 283 (1908) is one of several works that were dedicated to him. Schwedler's playing received high accolades. Of a performance on November 10, 1888, a critic wrote:

The outstanding flutist of our city's orchestra, Mr. Schwedler, in a performance of an Adagio by Spohr and an Hungarian Fantasy by F. Doppler, proved himself with regard to tone production, technique, brilliance and conception, once again to be the significant master of his instrument we have long appreciated and admired. As deserved, his consummate performances found enthusiastic applause.

His student Erich List described his teacher's playing:

On his conical wood flute (with a metal headjoint), Schwedler had a very warm and expressive tone; he had a timbre (especially in the middle register) which is impossible to achieve on the Boehm flute.

== Teaching and publications ==
Schwedler taught at the Leipzig Conservatory from 1908 to 1932. In 1897 he published Catechism of the Flute and Flute-Playing (the 1910 and 1923 editions were titled The Flute and Flute-Playing). Two years later, he published his own flute method, The Flute-Player's First Tutor. Paul Wetzger, a member of the City Orchestra of Essen, praised the book highly:

Even though with the number of flute methods today it seems daring to publish yet another one, the method published by M. Schwedler under the title "The Flute-Player's First Tutor" indeed deserves the widest respect and recommendation. The progressive order, as well as the extremely understandable text (German and English) stamps this work as one of the best flute methods of our time.

Schwedler's interest in early music is reflected in his numerous editions and transcriptions of early flute repertory, particularly works of Bach, Handel and Mozart. and in pioneering performances of Baroque music, including one at the 1892 International Exposition for Music and Theater in Vienna, where he played a flute concerto of Frederick the Great on a one-keyed traverso flute, accompanied by period instruments.

Schwedler compiled a volume of excerpts from Richard Wagner's operas which is still in print.

== Development of the Reform flute ==
Schwedler preferred the conical-bore transverse flute to the cylindrical-bore Boehm flute. Between 1885 and 1898 he worked with the Erfurt flute maker Friedrich Wilhelm Kruspe and later his son Carl Kruspe, Jr., making several changes to that company's flutes. Schwedler's version became known as the "Schwedler-Kruspe flute" and, after the instrument was patented in 1898, the "Schwedler-Kruspe Reform flute". (Note: According to Gustav Schreck, Hindemith jokingly referred to the Reform flute in a letter as the "Schwedler-Kruspe six-cylinder".) Schwedler's goal in developing the Reform flute was to improve its mechanism and response, to preserve the basic simple fingering system when possible and to improve the flute's intonation while maintaining the traditional, darker timbre which he believed blended more harmoniously with other winds when playing in ensemble.

Schwedler's Reform flute received praise from fellow musicians. In 1899, Arthur Nikisch, conductor of the Gewandhaus Orchestra, wrote:

I consider the improvements which Mr. Schwedler has added to the mechanism of the flute to be quite epoch-making. The absolute purity of intonation and tonal equality of the notes in all registers is enchanting; slurs and trills, etc., which previously sounded imperfect in spite of all the virtuosity of the player concerned, are now also made possible with Schwedler's system.

After its introduction in 1898, the Reform flute continued to be modified; for example, additional vent holes were added for improved intonation and better trills.

After breaking with Kruspe some time around 1921, Schwedler continued refining the Reform flute with instrument maker Moritz Max Mönnig. In the early years of the twentieth century many instrument makers copied Reform flute mechanisms, modifying them and adding inventions of their own.

But by around 1920, even in Leipzig, the last bastion of the Reform flute, Schwedler's successors in the Gewandhaus Orchestra were playing Boehm instruments. Strength of tone was given as the main reason for preference of Boehm flutes for orchestral playing by Dr. Hans A. Martens, writing in his 1925 article "The Flute in Music at Home", claimed that as far as professional flutists are concerned, the transition to the Boehm flute was practically complete. "The reasons for this are found in the absolute intonation and the uncommon volume of sound of the Boehm flute; this last characteristic is indispensable for the flute in the orchestra, where it has difficulty in projecting strongly, being tonally weak in comparison with other instruments, especially in the low register."

== Personal life ==
Schwedler married Karoline Neuhaus in 1878. They had two children—Max, born October 7, 1878, and Wilhelmine, born August 12, 1882. The family lived in an apartment on Mozart Strasse, across from the Gewandhaus. (Note: Both the apartment building and the Gewandhaus were severely damaged by allied bombing in 1943 and 1944. The ruins of the Gewandhaus were pulled down in 1968.)

Schwedler was a member of the Apollo Masonic Lodge in Leipzig. He was given the honorary Knight's Cross of the Order of Albrecht in 1908 and for his outstanding musical career he was given the honorary title of Royal Chamber Virtuoso in 1917, the year of his retirement from the Gewandhaus orchestra.

In 1940, at the age of 86, "old in years, his funds wiped out, with scarcely enough food to live on and no heat in the severe cold weather [...] with no hope in view," Schwedler took his own life. Schwedler's pupil Paul Klemm, however, contends that Schwedler committed suicide because he could not tolerate life under the Nazis. At the time of his death, his son Max and Max's sons Gerhard and Lothar were fighting on the battlefields of the second world war.

== Sources ==
- Bailey, John Robert (1987). Maximilian Schwedler's Flute and flute-playing: translation and study of late nineteenth-century German performance practice (DMA thesis). Evanston, Illinois: Northwestern University.
