= François-Joseph Fétis =

Belgian musicologist and critic (1784–1871)

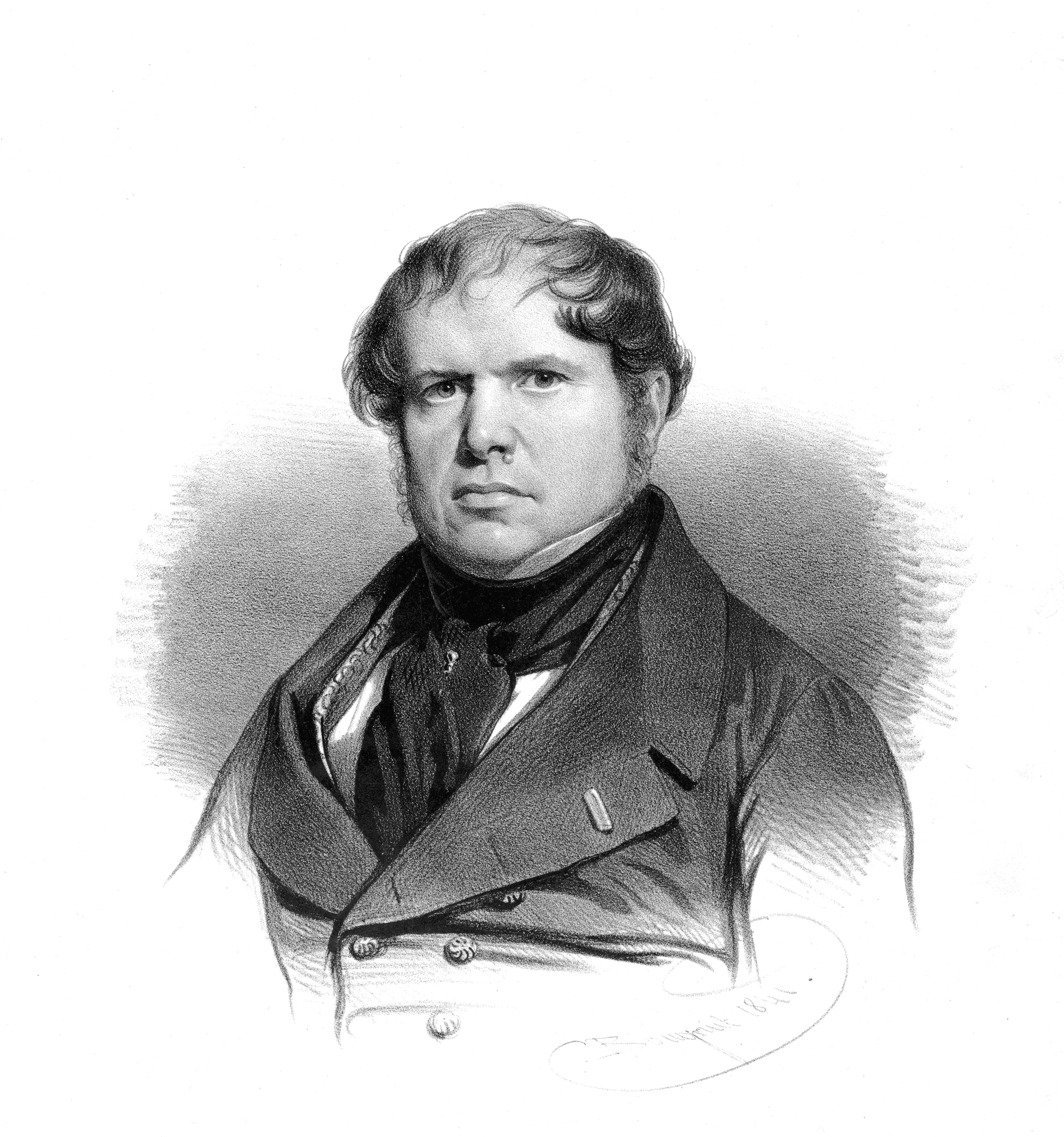
- Fétis in 1841, by Charles Baugniet
- Born: 25 March 1784; Mons
- Died: 26 March 1871 (aged 87); Brussels

François-Joseph Fétis (French: [fetis]; 25 March 1784 – 26 March 1871) was a Belgian musicologist, critic, teacher and composer. He was among the most influential music intellectuals in continental Europe. His enormous compilation of biographical data in the Biographie universelle des musiciens remains an important source of information today.

== Family ==
Fétis was born in Mons, Hainaut, eldest son of Antoine-Joseph Fétis and Élisabeth Desprets, daughter of a noted surgeon. He had nine brothers and sisters. His father was titular organist of the noble chapter of Saint-Waltrude. His grandfather was an organ manufacturer. He was trained as a musician by his father and played at young age on the choir organ of Saint Waltrude.

In October 1806 he married Adélaïde Robert, daughter of the French politician Pierre-François-Joseph Robert and Louise-Félicité de Kéralio, friend of Robespierre. They had two sons: the elder son Édouard Fétis helped his father with the editions of Revue Musicale and became member of the Royal Academy, while the younger son Adolphe Louis Eugène Fetis was a composer and professor.

In 1866 his wife died, and he withdrew from the Brussels society and court. When his father died, Eduard inherited his complete library and collection of musical instruments.

== Career ==
His talent for composition manifested itself at the age of seven, and at nine years old he was an organist at Saint Waltrude, Mons. In 1800 he went to Paris and completed his studies at the Conservatory under such masters as Boïeldieu, Jean-Baptiste Rey and Louis-Barthélémy Pradher.

In 1806 he undertook the revision of the Roman liturgical chants in the hope of discovering and establishing their original form. In this year he also began his Biographie universelle des musiciens, the most important of his works, which did not appear until 1834.

In 1821 he was appointed professor at the Paris Conservatory. In 1827 he founded the Revue musicale, the first serious paper in France devoted exclusively to musical matters. Fétis remained in the French capital till 1833, when at the request of Leopold I, he became director of the Royal Conservatory of Brussels and the king's chapelmaster. He also was the founder, and, until his death, the conductor of the celebrated concerts attached to the conservatory of Brussels, and he inaugurated a free series of lectures on musical history and philosophy.

Fétis produced a large quantity of original compositions, from the opera and the oratorio to the simple chanson, including several musical hoaxes, the most famous of which is the "Lute concerto by Valentin Strobel", premiered with Fernando Sor as soloist. Carcassi, as well as Sor, participated in the performance. The work is attributed not to the Alsascian lutenist Valentin Strobel, but to Jean (Johann) Strobach, a member of a prominent Bohemian family of musicians. This Strobach (fl. 1650–1720) served Leopold I, and there is no evidence that Fétis's score is a hoax. The composition was published in 1698, although no copy is known to have survived, except Fétis' manuscript score, which is in the Royal Conservatory Library in Brussels.

More important perhaps than his compositions are his writings on music. They are partly historical, such as the Curiosités historiques de la musique (Paris, 1850), and the Histoire générale de la musique (Paris, 1869—1876); and partly theoretical, such as the Méthode des méthodes de piano (Paris, 1840), written in conjunction with Moscheles.

Fétis was a contemporary of Niccolò Paganini, Robert Schumann, and Hector Berlioz, and he collaborated with the violin maker Jean-Baptiste Vuillaume. His writings serve as a primary source for researchers, dealers, and musicians studying the musical practices and instruments of the 19th century.

In 1856, he worked closely with Vuillaume in writing a treatise about Antonio Stradivari (Antoine Stradivari, luthier célèbre). It includes detailed chapters on the history and development of the violin family, old master Italian violin makers (including the Stradivari and Guarneri families) and an analysis of the bows of François Tourte. His interest in instruments can also be gathered from his very substantial collection, which includes the oldest surviving Arab oud.

While Fétis's critical opinions of contemporary music may seem conservative, his musicological work was ground-breaking, and unusual for the 19th century in attempting to avoid an ethnocentric and present-centered viewpoint. Unlike many others at the time, he did not see music history as a continuum of increasing excellence, moving towards a goal, but rather as something which was continually changing, neither becoming better nor worse, but continually adapting to new conditions. He believed that all cultures and times created art and music which were appropriate to their times and conditions; and he began a close study of Renaissance music as well as European folk music and music of non-European cultures. Thus Fétis built the foundation for what would later be termed comparative musicology.

Fétis died in Brussels. His valuable library was purchased by the Belgian government and presented to the Royal Library. His historical works, despite many inaccuracies, remain of great value for historians.

His pupils included Luigi Agnesi, Jean-Delphin Alard, Juan Crisóstomo Arriaga, Friedrich Berr, Louise Bertin, William Cusins, Julius Eichberg, Ferdinand Hérold, Frantz Jehin-Prume, Jacques-Nicolas Lemmens, Adolphe Samuel, Charles-Marie Widor, Hippolyte André Jean Baptiste Chélard, Émile Bienaimé, Théodore Labarre, Louis van Waefelghem, Federico Consolo, Jean-Grégoire Pénavaire, Jan Van den Eeden, François Riga, Charles Baetens, Stanisław Duniecki, and José Parada y Barreto. See: List of music students by teacher: C to F#François-Joseph Fétis.

== Fétis and Berlioz ==
Some of his criticisms of contemporary composers have become quite famous, as well as the responses that they engendered. He said of Berlioz, "...what Monsieur Berlioz composes is not part of that art which we distinguish as music, and I am completely certain that he lacks the most basic capability in this art." In the Revue musicale issue of 1 February 1835 he wrote of the Symphonie Fantastique:

I saw that melody was antipathetic to him, that he only had a faint notion of rhythm; that his harmony, formed by an often monstrous accretion of notes, was nevertheless flat and monotonous; in a word I saw that he lacked melodic and harmonic ideas, and I judged that he would always write in a barbarous manner; but I saw that he had the instinct for instrumentation, and I thought that he could fulfil a useful vocation in discovering certain combinations that others would put to better use than he.

Berlioz, who had proof-read Fétis' editions of the first eight Beethoven symphonies for the publisher Troupenas, commented that

[Fétis had altered Beethoven's harmonies] with unbelievable complacency. Opposite the E flat which the clarinet sustains over a chord of the sixth (D flat, F, B flat) in the andante of the C minor symphony, Fétis had naively written ‘This E flat must be F. Beethoven could not have possibly made so gross a blunder.' In other words, a man like Beethoven could not possibly fail to be in entire agreement with the harmonic theories of M. Fétis.

Troupenas did in fact remove Fétis' editorial marks, but Berlioz was still unsatisfied. He went on to criticize Fétis in one of the monologues of Lélio, ou le Retour à la vie, the 1832 sequel to Symphonie Fantastique:

These young theorists of eighty, living in the midst of a sea of prejudices and persuaded that the world ends with the shores of their island; these old libertines of every age who demand that music caress and amuse them, never admitting that the chaste muse could have a more noble mission; especially these desecrators who dare lay hands on original works, subjecting them to horrible mutilations that they call corrections and perfections, which, they say, require considerable taste. Curses on them! They make a mockery of art! Such are these vulgar birds who populate our public gardens, perching arrogantly on the most beautiful statues, and, when they have soiled the brow of Jupiter, Hercules' arm, or the breast of Jupiter, strut and preen as though they have laid a golden egg.

Not one to be outdone, Fétis may have had the last word in this debate. In the 1845 edition of his treatise La musique mise à la porte de tout le monde, he describes the word "fantastique" saying that "this word has even slid into music. ‘Fantastique' music is composed of instrumental effects with no melodic line and incorrect harmony."

== Theoretical work ==
Although known primarily for his contributions to musicology and criticism, Fétis had effects on the realm of music theory as well. In 1841 he put together the first history of harmonic theory, his Esquisse de l'histoire de l'harmonie. Assembled from individual articles that Fétis published in the Revue et Gazette musicale de Paris around 1840, the book predates Hugo Riemann's more well known Geschichte der Musiktheorie by fifty years. The Esquisse, as the title implies, is a general outline rather than an exhaustive study. Fétis is attempting to show the "facts, errors, and truths" of previous theories and theorists, as he interprets them, in order to provide a solid grounding for other scholars and to prevent subsequent interpretive mistakes.

Fétis' main theoretical work and the culmination of his conceptual frameworks of tonality and harmony is the Traité complet de la théorie et de la pratique de l'harmonie of 1844. This book has influenced later theorists and composers including Paul Hindemith, Ernst Kurth, and Franz Liszt. In the Musik-Lexicon of 1882, Hugo Riemann states that "to [Fétis'] meditations we are indebted for the modern concept of tonality…he found himself emancipated from the spirit of a particular age, and able to render justice to all the various styles of music." Though some other theorists, most notably Matthew Shirlaw, have had decidedly negative views, Riemann's assessment captures the two key features of Fétis' text. Though he did not coin the term "tonality," Fétis developed the concept into its present-day form. He claimed that "tonalité" is the primary organizing agent of all melodic and harmonic successions and that the efforts of other theorists to find the fundamental principle of music in "acoustics, mathematics, aggregations of intervals, or classifications of chords have been futile."

The majority of the Traité complet is devoted to explaining how tonalité organizes music. The primary factor of determining tonality is the scale. It sets out the order of the succession of tones in major and minor (the only two "tonal" modes which he recognizes), the distances which separate the tones, and the resultant melodic and harmonic tendencies. Tonality is not only a governed and conditioned state, but it is a socially conditioned one. Scales are cultural manifestations, resulting from shared experience and education. Nature provides the elements of tonalité, but human understanding, sensibility, and will determine particular harmonic systems. This concept was called a "Metaphysical principle" by Fétis, though Carl Dahlhaus argues that the term is used in this case to denote an anthropological, culturally relative sense in his 1990 book Studies on the Origin of Harmonic Tonality, and theorist Rosalie Schellhous posits that the Kantian term "transcendental" might be more appropriate.

In his comparative work, Fétis attempted "a new method of classifying human races according to their musical systems" following contemporary trends of social darwinism in the emerging fields of ethnology and anthropology.

=== Harmonic and rhythmic modulation ===
However, if one wishes to interpret Fétis' metaphysical theory, one of his unique theoretical ideas is laid out in book 3 of the Traité complet, that of harmonic modulation. Fétis argues that tonality has evolved over the course of time through four distinct phases, or ordres:

- Unitonic – Resulting from plainchant tonality, the unitonic phase consists mainly of consonant triads with no possibility for modulation due to the lack of the tritone between the 4th and 7th scale degrees. This phase is also referred to by Fétis as tonalité ancienne.
- Transitonic – Order which began with the introduction of the dominant 7th chord into harmonic discourse, sometime between Zarlino and Monteverdi. This development is also directly related to the codification of cadential systems and periodic phrase structure.
- Pluritonic – Modulation is achieved through enharmonic relationships in which one note of a chord is considered the point of contact between different scales. Fétis claims that Mozart was the first to use such modulations as a means of expression. In this order, the diminished 7th and augmented 6th chords become important as they can modulate to several different tonalities.
- Omnitonic – The final phase of tonality, and one embodied for Fétis by Wagner, where the alteration of the intervals of natural chords and modification by substitution of notes is so complex that it becomes impossible to identify the original chord. This is seen as a period of extremes, and undesirable compared to the moderately chromatic music of Meyerbeer.

Fétis later applied this same system of ordres to rhythm, "the least advanced part of music...[where] great things remain to be discovered." Though he did not publish these theories in any of his treatises, they appear in several articles for the Revue musicale and in some lectures which had a profound impact on Liszt. Though music had not yet made it past the first phase, Unirhythm, by Fétis' time, he argues that composers may be able to "mutate" from one meter to another within the same melodic phrase. Though Liszt may have been an open disciple of the ideas of the Omnitonic and Omnirhythmic, the influence of such thinking can perhaps be seen most clearly in the music of Brahms, where hemiola and mixing of time signatures is a common occurrence.

== "Se i miei sospiri" ==
The Italian art song, "Se i miei sospiri", appeared in a Paris concert organized by Fétis in 1833. Fétis published the piece for voice and strings in 1838 and then again in 1843 for voice and piano with alternate lyrics ("Pietà, Signore"). It is these alternate lyrics with which the piece is now typically associated. Fétis attributed the song to Alessandro Stradella and claimed to possess an original manuscript of the work but never produced it for examination. As early as 1866, musicologists were questioning the authenticity of the song, and when Fétis' library was acquired by the Royal Library in Brussels after his death, no such manuscript could be found. Owing to this and the fact that the style of the piece is inconsistent with Stradella's own period, the authorship of the piece is now typically attributed to Fétis himself. The original Italian text for the song (Se i miei sospiri) was found set to different music by Alessandro Scarlatti in his 1693 oratorio "The Martyrdom of St. Theodosia".

== Publications ==
- Biographies de Joseph et Michael Haydn (Paris, n.d.)
- Méthode elementaire et abregée d'harmonie et d'accompagnement (Paris: Petit, 1823)
- Traité du contrepoint et de la fugue... (Paris: Charles Michael Ozu, 1824)
- Revue musicale (Paris, 1827–35)
- Curiosités historiques de la musique, complément nécessaire de la musique mise à la portée de tout le monde (Paris: Janet et Cotelle, 1830)
- Biographie universelle des musiciens et bibliographie générale de la musique (Brussels, 1833–1844 [8 vols.])
- Traité du chant en choeur (Paris, 1837)
- Esquisse de l'histoire de l'harmonie considérée comme art et comme science systématique (Paris, 1840).
- Traité complet de la théorie et de la pratique de l'harmonie (Paris and Brussels, 1844)
- Antoine Stradivari, luthier célèbre (Paris, 1856)
- Histoire générale de la musique (Paris, 1869–76; 5 vls., unfinished)

== Honours ==
- Kingdom of Belgium:
  - Master of the Royal Music.
  - Grand Officer in the Order of Leopold.
- Kingdom of the Netherlands: Commander in the Order of the Oak Crown.
- Kingdom of Prussia: Knight of the Order of the Red Eagle.
- Kingdom of France: Officer of the Legion of Honour.

Academic Honours

- Member of the Royal Academy of Science, Letters and Fine Arts of Belgium.
- Member of the Academy of Rome.
- Member of the Academy of Berlin.
- Member of the Academy of Vienna.
- Member of the Academy of Stockholm.
- Member of the Academy of London.

== Compositions ==
=== Ensembles ===
- String Quartet No. 1
- String Quartet No. 2
- Grand Sextet, Op. 5

=== Overtures ===
- Ouverture de concert à grand orchestre

=== Concertos ===
- 1869: Flute Concerto in B minor

=== Symphonies ===
- 1862: Symphony No. 1 in E-flat major
- Symphonic Fantasy for organ and orchestra

=== Masses ===
- Messe di Requiem

=== Songs ===
- Se i miei sospiri
