= Josef Reicha =

Czech cellist, composer and conductor (1752–1795)

Josef Reicha (12 February 1752 – 5 March 1795), also spelt Rejcha, was a Czech cellist, composer and conductor. He was the uncle of composer and music theorist Anton Reicha.

Josef Reicha was born in Chudenice. In 1761 he moved to Prague, where he was taught cello by Franz Joseph Werner. In 1771, Reicha became first cellist in the orchestra of Prince (Fürst) Kraft Ernst von Oettingen-Wallerstein. Together with the famous violinist Anton Janitsch, who also played in the orchestra, Reicha toured several European cities during the late 1770s and visited Leopold Mozart in Salzburg in 1778. In his letters to Wolfgang Amadeus, Leopold praised Reicha's cello playing and compared the style of one of his cello concerts to those by Wolfgang Amadeus.

Reicha adopted his nephew Anton in 1780 (Josef married in 1779, but the marriage produced no children) and subsequently taught him the violin and the piano. In 1785 Josef was made director of the orchestra in Bonn by Maximilian Francis of Austria, Elector of Cologne; the whole family moved to Bonn. Anton became a member of the court orchestra through his uncle. Other members included the young Beethoven, who played the viola and the organ, and Nikolaus Simrock, founder of the Simrock music publishing firm, who played the horn in the orchestra. Simrock would later publish Josef's works. In 1789 Josef became music director of the new theatre, Bonner Nationaltheater. His musical career was cut short in 1791, when he contracted gout. He died four years later in Bonn.

== Style ==
Reicha wrote music for orchestra and chamber ensembles of different kinds. His works include symphonies, various concertos including eleven for cello, twelve partitas for wind instruments and miscellaneous other works. Most of Reicha's compositions were completed in Wallerstein, such as his flute concerto, before his Bonn years. Music scholar Ludwig Schiedermair in 'Der junge Beethoven' (Leipzig, 1925) gave specific examples taken from Reicha's partitas and symphonies and said that these works influenced Beethoven.
