= 3 Songs =

Three Songs or 3 Songs (also Song Three or variants such as Drei Lieder, Tres canciones and Trois Chansons), may refer to:

== Music ==
=== Classical compositions ===
- Three Songs String Quartet No. 1, by Efraín Amaya
- Three Songs, Op. 12, by Hubert Parry
- Three Songs to Poems by Arthur Symons (1918–19), three poems set to music by John Ireland
- Three Songs to Poems by Thomas Hardy (1925), three poems set to music by John Ireland
- Three Songs (Ireland, 1926), three poems by various poets set to music by John Ireland in 1926
- 3 Strindbergsvisor for mixed choir a cappella (1959), Three Songs by Ingvar Lidholm
- Three Songs (W. H. Davies); see List of compositions by Arthur Bliss
- 3 Songs, Op. 3b, by Ib Nørholm

Drei Lieder

- Drei Lieder (Stockhausen)
- Drei Lieder nach Shakespeare

Tres canciones

- Tres canciones españolas, by Joaquín Rodrigo
- Tres canciones españolas, by Antón García Abril
- Tres canciones de Segovia, by Carmelo Bernaola
- Tres Canciones, by Blas Galindo Dimas
- Tres Canciones, by Benjamín Gutiérrez
- Tres Canciones, by Oscar Espla
- Tres Canciones, by Alberto Soriano
- Tres Canciones, by Jose Moreno Gans
- Tres canciones campesinas, by Cesar Perez Sentenat (also composed "Tríptico de villancicos")
- Tres canciones (Byron) (1954) by Alicia Terzian
- Tres canciones negras (1946) by Xavier Montsalvatge
- Tres Canciones Campesinas de Chile, by Jorge Urrutia-Blondel

Trois Chansons

- Trois Chansons, Op. 11, by Benjamin C. S. Boyle
- Trois chansons de Charles d’Orléans by Claude Debussy
- Trois Chansons, Op. 20, by Jean Martinon
- Trois Chansons by Maurice Ravel
- Trois chansons, List of compositions by Lord Berners
- Trois chansons Op. 20 (1938), Jean Martinon
- Trois Chansons (2014) hommage à Debbusy et Ravel, by Daniel Knaggs

=== Albums ===
- Three Songs EP, 2012 EP by Twenty One Pilots
- Three Songs (Tall Dwarfs EP), 1981 EP by Tall Dwarfs
- 3 Songs (Fugazi EP), 1990 EP by Fugazi
- 3-Song EP (Royal Trux EP), 1998 EP by Royal Trux
- A Three Song Recording, 1999 single by The Black Heart Procession
- Three Songs, 2002 EP by Papa M
- 3 Songs (Tumbledown EP), 2007 EP by Tumbledown
- Tres Canciones, 1976 album by Diomedes Díaz

=== Songs ===
- "3" (Britney Spears song), 2009
- "3 a.m." (Eminem song), 2009
- "3" (Disturbed song), 2011
- "Song Three", a song from the Mahagonny-Songspiel, 1927
- "Song 3", a song from the 2002 Robbie Williams album Escapology (album)

== See also ==
- 3 (disambiguation)
- Trois Mélodies (disambiguation) (3 melodies)
