= Two Songs =

Two Songs or Dos Canciones may refer to:

== Literature ==
- Dos Canciones à la Armada Invencible, poetry by Miguel de Cervantes (1547–1616)

== Music ==
- Two Songs for Voice, Viola and Piano, Op. 91 by Brahms (1884)
- A number of compositions by Nikolai Rimsky-Korsakov (1844–1908)
- A number of works by John Ireland:
  - Two Songs, 1916, settings of Eric Thirkell Cooper
  - Two Songs, 1917-18, settings of Rupert Brooke
  - Two Songs, 1920, settings of Aldous Huxley and Sir Philip Sidney
  - Two Songs, 1928, settings of Dante Gabriel Rossetti and Arthur Symons
- 2 Songs, for voice and piano, Op. 3 (1938) by Alberto Ginastera
- 2 Songs, by Arlo Guthrie, 1992
- Dos Canciones for tenor and orchestra, by Florencio Pozadas (1939–1968)

== See also ==
- Two Songs to be sung of a summer night on the water, Op. 91 (1917), by Delius
- Dos Canciones Argentinas and Dos Canciones sobre Ritmos Paraguayos, works by José Bragato (1915–2017)
