= 1913 in British music =

This is a summary of 1913 in music in the United Kingdom.

== Events ==
- 10 September – The première of Jean Sibelius's tone poem Luonnotar takes place at the Three Choirs Festival in Gloucester Cathedral, with soprano Aino Ackté and orchestra conducted by Herbert Brewer.
- 1 October – Marie Lloyd and her lover, Bernard Dillon, are arrested by the US immigration authorities on their arrival in New York, when it is discovered that they are not married.
- date unknown
  - Edward Bairstow becomes organist of York Minster.
  - Ivor Novello moves into a flat above the Strand Theatre in London's West End; in 2005, the theatre would be renamed in his honour.

== Popular music ==
- Albert Ketèlbey – "My Heart Still Clings to You"
- Arnold Safroni-Middleton – "Imperial Echoes"

== Recordings ==
- Harry Lauder – "It's Nicer To Be In Bed"

== Classical music: new works ==
- Arnold Bax – Three Pieces for Small Orchestra
- York Bowen – At the Play
- George Butterworth – The Banks of Green Willow
- Edward Elgar – Falstaff
- Gustav Holst – St Paul's Suite
- John Ireland
  - Decorations
  - The Forgotten Rite
  - The Holy Boy
- Ralph Vaughan Williams – Fantasia on a Theme by Thomas Tallis (revised version)

== Musical theatre ==
- 7 February – After the Girl, with music by Paul Rubens and lyrics by Percy Greenbank, opens at the Gaiety Theatre for a run of 105 performances.
- 18 February – Oh! Oh! Delphine!, with music by Ivan Caryll and lyrics by C.M.S. McLellan, opens at the Shaftesbury Theatre for a run of 174 performances.
- 25 September – The Pearl Girl, with music by Howard Talbot & Hugo Felix and lyrics by Basil Hood, opens at the Shaftesbury Theatre, starring Marjorie Maxwell, for a run of 254 performances.

== Publications ==
- Francesco Berger – Reminiscences, Impressions, and Anecdotes.
- Frank Bridge – Second Book of Organ Pieces

== Births ==
- 27 January – Jack Brymer, clarinettist (died 2003)
- 28 February – Wally Ridley, record producer and songwriter (died 2007)
- 13 March – Tessie O'Shea, entertainer (died 1995)
- 2 April – Ronald Center, composer (died 1973)
- 28 June – George Lloyd, composer (died 1998)
- 28 August – Robert Irving, conductor (died 1991)
- 22 November – Benjamin Britten, composer (died 1976)
- date unknown – Eiluned Davies, Anglo Welsh concert pianist and composer (died 1999)

== Deaths ==
- 19 March – John Thomas, harpist and composer, 87
- 5 May – Helen Carte (Helen Lenoir; née Black), impresario, 60
- 17 July – Armes Beaumont, singer best known in Australia, 70
- 26 August – Michael Maybrick, singer and composer, 72
- 13 September – Alfred Gaul, composer, conductor and organist, 76
- 20 October – Charles Brookfield, musical theatre writer, 56 (tuberculosis)
- 6 December – Alexander Hurley, music hall performer, 42 (pneumonia)

== See also ==
- 1913 in the United Kingdom
