= Two Pieces for Piano =

Two Pieces for Piano may refer to:

- Two Pieces for piano (1867, Pyotr Ilyich Tchaikovsky, Op. 1)
- Two Pieces for Piano (1921, John Ireland)
- Two Pieces for Piano (1925, John Ireland)
- Two Pieces for Piano (1929–30, John Ireland)
