= Prelude in E-flat major (John Ireland) =

Prelude in E♭ major is a 1924 piece for piano solo by the English composer John Ireland. It was premiered on 13 January 1925 by Harriet Cohen at the Wigmore Hall in London.

According to John France, the date at the end of the score, 22 February 1924, indicates that the piece (though not explicitly stated) was dedicated to Arthur George Miller, a chorister at St Luke’s Church in Chelsea, whose birthday was on 22 February. Other works by Ireland dedicated to Miller include On a Birthday Morning (1922), Bergomask (1925) and February’s Child (1929).

A performance takes 5 to 6 minutes.
