= Roy Henderson (baritone) =

British opera singer (1899–2000)

Henderson near the start of his career

Roy Galbraith Henderson CBE (4 July 1899 – 16 March 2000) was a British baritone singer, conductor and teacher.

Born in Edinburgh and raised in Nottingham, Henderson began singing in public during the First World War, entertaining his army colleagues. After the war he enrolled at the Royal Academy of Music (RAM) in London, where he won numerous prizes. He received wider notice in 1925 for deputising at short notice in the difficult and important baritone part in Frederick Delius's A Mass of Life at a London concert. Henderson maintained a successful concert career for the next 27 years, taking part in the premieres of many works by British composers.

Henderson appeared in opera in two seasons at Covent Garden in 1928 and 1929, and was a founding member of the company of the Glyndebourne Festival, singing there in every season from 1935 to 1939. He was also well known as a recitalist, performing classic and new songs. He made many recordings, mainly for the Decca company, although he is particularly remembered for recordings from Glyndebourne and a 1938 Columbia recording of Ralph Vaughan Williams's Serenade to Music in which Henderson and fifteen other leading British singers took part. In addition to singing he was a conductor, mostly of choral music, and made some recordings in that capacity.

From the start of his career Henderson aimed to be a teacher of singing. He took pupils from the late 1920s onwards, and was a professor at the RAM from 1940. In 1953, he retired from public performance and devoted himself to full-time teaching. Among his many pupils the best-known was Kathleen Ferrier, and others included Jennifer Vyvyan (soprano), Constance Shacklock (mezzo-soprano), Norma Procter (contralto), Thomas Round (tenor) and John Shirley-Quirk and Derek Hammond-Stroud (baritones).

== Early years ==
Henderson was born in Edinburgh, the third child and elder son of the Rev Alexander Roy Henderson and his wife, Jean Boyd, née Galbraith. Alexander Henderson was minister of the Augustine Congregational Church between 1895 and 1902, when he moved to England to take charge of Castle Gate Congregational Church, Nottingham. Henderson attended Nottingham High School, where he received a classical education and became captain of the cricket team.

During the First World War Henderson served in the Artists Rifles and the Nottinghamshire and Derbyshire Regiment. In his hut were two well-known baritones, Percy Heming and Charles Mott, the latter being particularly helpful to him. Henderson joined an army concert party entertaining the troops, and he began learning the knack of what he called "putting it over" to an audience. According to his colleague Keith Falkner, it was then that Henderson learned to sing in public, "practising what was to become a flexible and immaculate voice during late-night sentry duty". Before he returned to civilian life he auditioned for a well-known bass-baritone, Robert Radford, who recommended a career as a singer: "He told me the raw material was there, and the rest depended on myself".

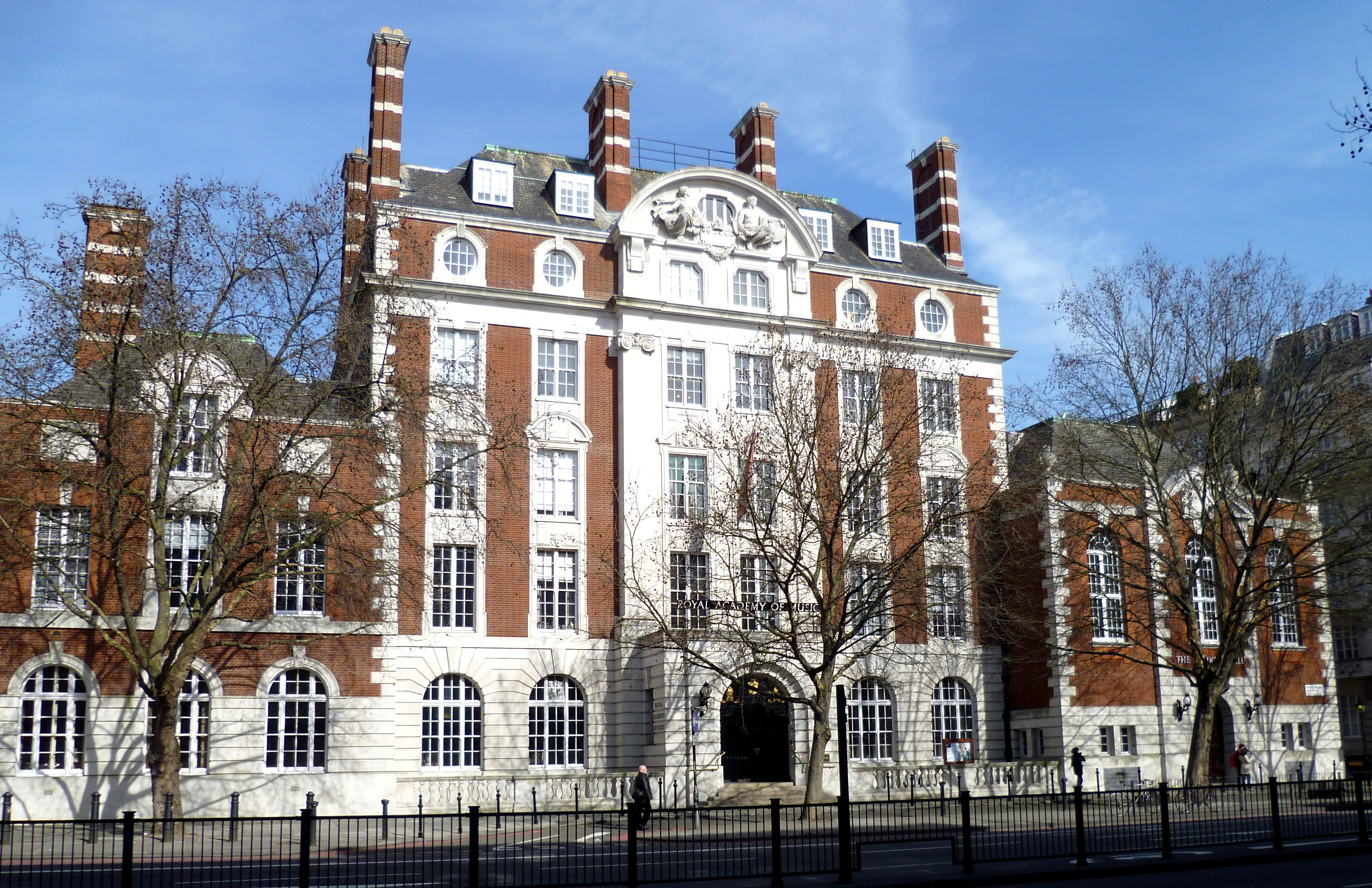
The Royal Academy of Music in London where Henderson studied from 1920 to 1925 and taught from 1940 to 1974

After the war Henderson gained a government grant of £150 a year to study at the Royal Academy of Music (RAM). There he won thirteen awards, including the Betjemann gold medal for singing, the Worshipful Company of Musicians' medal, and the medal for the most distinguished student of the year. In addition, he led the RAM's cricket team against the Royal College of Music, captained by Falkner, who later described his opposite number as "a passionate sportsman, playing cricket (a crafty spin-bowler) and football (a tenacious goalkeeper)". While still a student Henderson made his first broadcast in August 1922, for the Marconi Company, shortly before the establishment of the BBC.

Senior students could be appointed sub-professors − assistants to faculty members − and while serving in that capacity Henderson decided in 1923 that when he reached the age of fifty he would retire from singing and devote himself to teaching. Before the end of the 1920s he was giving private lessons in "voice production and the interpretation of song" alongside his singing career.

On March 27, 1926, Henderson married Bertha Collin Smyth (1901–1985), a fellow student from the RAM. They had a son and two daughters.

== Singing career ==
=== Concerts ===
In April 1925 Henderson came to public notice by stepping in at short notice to sing the baritone part in Delius's A Mass of Life at the Queen's Hall for the Royal Philharmonic Society when the intended soloist, Percy Heming, withdrew. A London newspaper reported the next day:

The soloists were Mme Miriam Licette, Miss Astra Desmond, Mr Walter Widdop, and Mr Roy Henderson, who took the all-important baritone part. The success of this young Scottish singer, who was making his first appearance at an important concert, was emphatic. He not only has a voice which he uses well, but is a singer of exceptional intelligence. His interpretation was not only musically excellent, but showed a rare understanding of the elusive spirit of the text. Mr. Henderson, who undertook the part at short notice, moreover sung by heart. … He is only 24 and should go far. (Note: He was in fact 25 rather than 24, as he pointed out in a later interview.)

Fellow Delians Sir Thomas Beecham and Sir Hamilton Harty

Singing from memory was Henderson's lifelong preference. He found it inhibiting to have to look at a score while singing. After his 1925 success in A Mass of Life, he sang in all further British performances of the work − thirteen in all − between then and 1946. Six were conducted by Sir Thomas Beecham, whom Henderson admired, although finding himself instinctively more in rapport with Sir Hamilton Harty: "I felt with Harty that there was a sort of joint effort − whatever I did he responded to, and whatever he did I responded to". After a performance of the Mass of Life with Harty in 1932 Delius wrote to Henderson saying that it had been the best performance he had heard. The composer sent him a signed photograph inscribed "To the unequalled interpreter of Zarathustra". He asked for Henderson as soloist in his Sea Drift, and in 1933 Henderson sang in the premiere of Delius's Idyll at a promenade concert under Sir Henry Wood. With Beecham, Henderson performed Delius's Songs of Sunset and An Arabesque at the 1934 Leeds Festival.

Other works by British composers in which Henderson was soloist at the first performance include Bliss's Serenade for Orchestra and Voice, under Malcolm Sargent (1929), Dyson's The Canterbury Pilgrims under the composer (1931), Vaughan Williams's Five Tudor Portraits (1935) and Dona nobis pacem (1936), both conducted by the composer, and E. J. Moeran's Nocturne (1935). He was one of the sixteen soloists chosen for the Serenade to Music (1938), which Vaughan Williams composed as a tribute to Wood for the latter's golden jubilee as a conductor. The composer wrote the music with each soloist's voice in mind, and like the other singers, Henderson is commemorated in the published score which prints each soloist's initials alongside his or her lines, in Henderson's case "Nor is not mov'd with concord of sweet sounds".

Henderson's concert repertory was wide and varied. He was closely associated with the choral works of Elgar, and sang under the composer's baton in The Dream of Gerontius in 1933. Henderson was greatly admired in Elgar's The Apostles, In Grove's Dictionary of Music and Musicians, Alan Blyth quotes a review from The Times:

Among the solo singers the most outstanding was Mr Roy Henderson, who delivered the words of Jesus with a gentle, firm conviction that tallied with his ability to sing the whole of the music without a score in his hand. He breathed the true atmosphere as by nature fitted to it.

The Times called Henderson's performance of Mendelssohn's Elijah "unforgettable in its dramatic eloquence" and praised the nobility of his Jesus in Bach's St Matthew Passion.

=== Opera ===
Henderson's professional operatic career began in 1928. He had played Ford in Falstaff in RAM student productions at the Scala Theatre in 1925 and 1926, receiving strong praise, and he made a well-received record for Vocalion of a scene from the opera, singing the parts of both Ford and Falstaff. His professional debut in opera was in the 1928 international season at Covent Garden. He sang Donner in Das Rheingold and Kothner in Die Meistersinger von Nürnberg. In the following Covent Garden season he appeared again in Das Rheingold and sang the Herald in Lohengrin, conducted respectively by Bruno Walter and Robert Heger. Also in 1929, conducted by John Barbirolli, he played Ford in Falstaff for the British National Opera Company, opposite his RAM Falstaff, Arthur Fear.

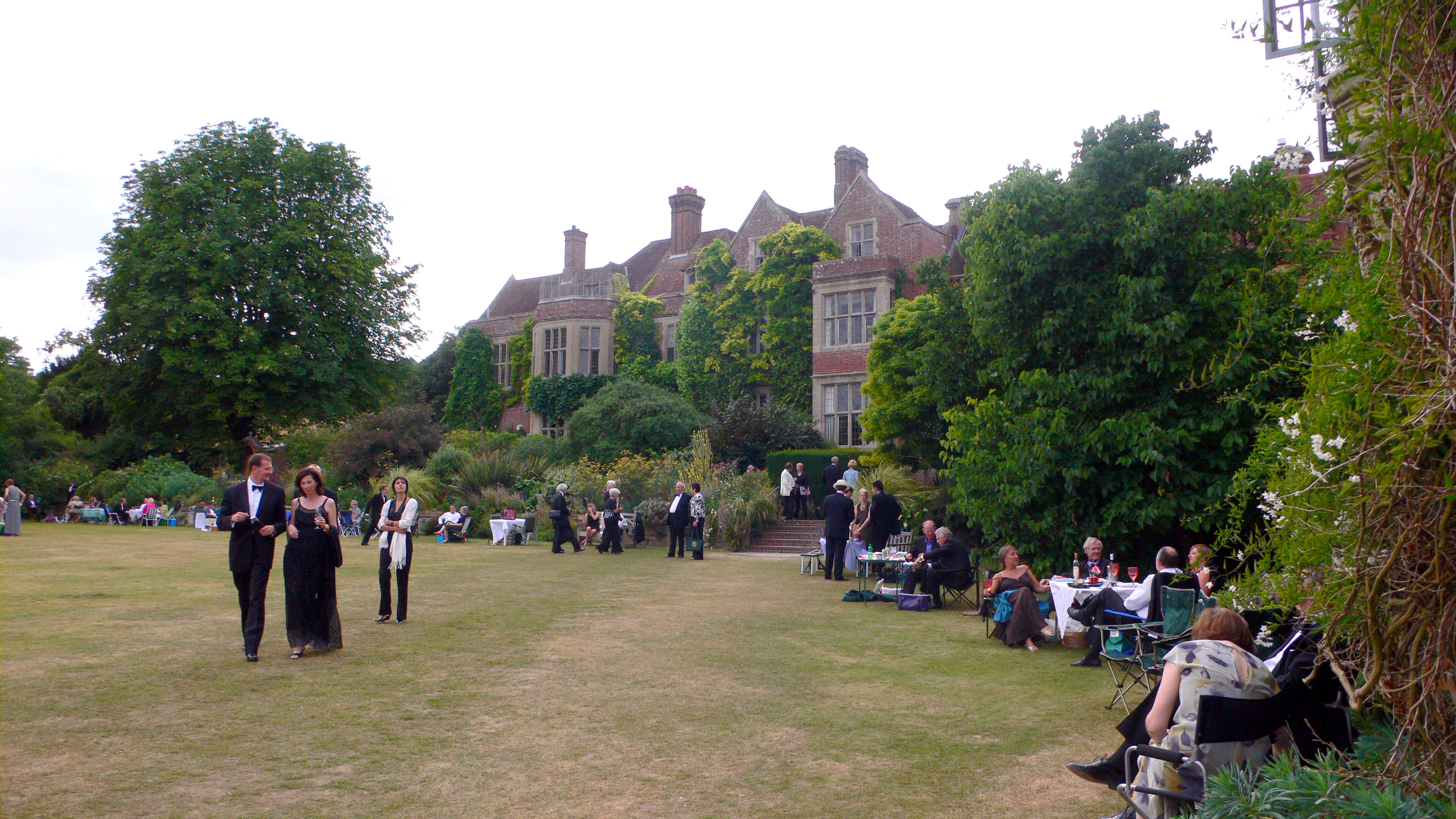
Glyndebourne (2006 photograph)

After 1929 Henderson made no further appearances at Covent Garden. In 1931 he was the baritone soloist in a concert performance of Manuel de Falla's opera Master Peter's Puppet Show, conducted by the composer. He became closely associated with the Glyndebourne Festival. In 1934 he sang Count Almaviva in Le nozze di Figaro on the opening night of the festival's inaugural season and at twelve further performances in 1934 and 1935. Thereafter he appeared at Glyndebourne every year until the outbreak of the Second World War in 1939. His other roles there were Papageno in Die Zauberflöte (16 performances, 1936−1937), Guglielmo in Così fan tutte (19 performances, 1936−1939) and Masetto in Don Giovanni (36 performances, 1936−1939). Of these, his favourite roles were Papageno and Guglielmo: "not the Count which I didn't enjoy particularly. It's an angry, jealous part and I'm much more inclined to comedy". The conductor was Fritz Busch, who was, along with Harty, the conductor Henderson most liked working with. In 1940 the Glyndebourne company went on tour with a production of The Beggar's Opera in which Henderson played Peachum and was scheduled to take over from Michael Redgrave as Macheath, but the fall of France and evacuation from Dunkirk forced the cancellation of the tour.

=== Song recitals ===
Throughout his singing career Henderson gave song recitals. While still a student he sang in his home town, Nottingham, as early as 1920 (in "a variety of songs more or less modern"). The accompanist Gerald Moore wrote that Henderson's "quiet unobtrusive manner concealed a probing mind and an imagination that made every song he sang vital":

On the platform he was packed with personality. He knew so exactly what he was going to do with a song that, once his mind was made up, he never deviated – would treat it with the same colour, mood, rhythm, a thousand times without robbing it of freshness or zest. Not for him the sudden inspiration or spur-of-the moment whim: everything was carefully and methodically planned, considered from all angles, absorbed until it became a part of him, and finally presented as a finished picture.

Moore added, "Our enjoyable work together apart, I know of no colleague with a livelier humour and keener sense of fun". The music critic Alan Blyth wrote of Henderson, "Though his voice was not intrinsically very beautiful, he used it with intelligence and charm".

== Conductor and teacher ==
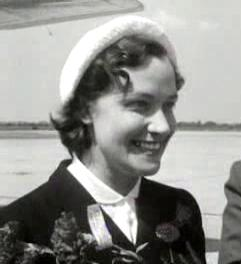
Kathleen Ferrier, Henderson's most celebrated pupil

Alongside his career as a singer Henderson developed what The Times described as "a sideline as a talented and highly respected choral conductor" He was conductor of the Huddersfield Glee and Madrigal Society from 1932 to 1939, and trained the Nottingham Harmonic Society, which during the inter-war years was a particularly well known choir. In 1936, he founded the Nottingham Oriana Choir and directed it until 1952. From 1942 to 1953 he conducted the Bournemouth Municipal Choir.

Henderson retired from public performance in March 1952 to concentrate on teaching, as he had long planned. By then he had been a professor at the RAM for twelve years and continued in that capacity until 1974. After retiring from the academy he continued to teach privately for many years. His pupils at the RAM and elsewhere included the sopranos Jennifer Vyvyan, Rae Woodland, Pauline Tinsley and Marie Hayward, the mezzo-sopranos Constance Shacklock and Gillian Knight, the contraltos Kathleen Ferrier and Norma Procter, the tenor Thomas Round, the baritones John Shirley-Quirk and Derek Hammond-Stroud, and the bass Hervey Alan. After Ferrier's early death, Henderson contributed a chapter on being her teacher and friend in a memorial volume edited by Neville Cardus in 1954.

== Recordings ==
Henderson began making records in the days of acoustic recording, and in his old age it pleased him to be, as he put it, "one of the last people alive to have sung into a horn". Some of his early recordings were included in a 1999 CD set released to mark his centenary.

=== Decca ===
Henderson had a long association with the Decca record company from its early days in 1929. As a singer he made these Decca recordings:

Year	Composer	Title	With
1929	Delius	Sea Drift	New English Symphony Orchestra and Choir, Julian Clifford
1929	Tchaikovsky	"Don Juan's Serenade" Op. 38/1 and "To the forest" Op. 47/5	Leslie Heward (piano)
1930	Puccini	La bohème: "Ah! Mimì!"	Frank Titterton (tenor), Orchestra, Leslie Heward
	Verdi	La forza del destino: "Solenne in quest'ora"	Frank Titterton (tenor), Orchestra, Leslie Heward
1935	Purcell	Dido and Aeneas	Nancy Evans (Dido), Mary Hamlin (Belinda), Mary Jarred (Sorceress), Boyd Neel String Orchestra, Clarence Raybould
1941	Butterworth	A Shropshire Lad	Gerald Moore (piano)
1941	Warlock	Six songs	Gerald Moore (piano)
1943	Ireland	"Sea Fever" and "The Soldier"	Ivor Newton (piano)
1943	Stanford	"The Fairy Lough" Op. 77/2	Ivor Newton (piano)
1943	Stanford	"The Pibroch" Op. 157/1	Ivor Newton (piano)
1944	Dale	"Come away, death" Op. 9/2	Eric Gritton (piano), Max Gilbert (viola)
1944	Purcell	"Music for a while"	Eric Gritton (piano)
1944	Vaughan Williams	"Silent noon"	Eric Gritton (piano)
1944	Stanford	"A soft day" Op. 140/3	Eric Gritton (piano)
1944	Somervell	"Maud" – song cycle	Eric Gritton (piano)
1945	Boyce	"Song of Momus to Mars"	Eric Gritton (piano)
1945	Vaughan Williams	"Orpheus with his lute"	Eric Gritton (piano)
1945	Schubert	"Who is Sylvia?"	Eric Gritton (piano)
1945	Cornelius	"The monotone" Op. 3/3	Eric Gritton (piano)
1946	Mendelssohn	Elijah: "Lord God of Abraham" and "It is enough"	Orchestra conducted by Charles Groves

Source: Decca.

As a conductor Henderson made three sets for Decca:

Year	Composer	Title	With
1943	Brahms	Vier Gesänge Op. 17	Nottingham Oriana Choir, Gwendolen Mason (harp), Dennis Brain and Norman Del Mar (horns)
1943	Holst	Rig Veda – "Hymn to the Waters"	Nottingham Oriana Choir
1946	Pergolesi	Stabat Mater in F minor	Kathleen Ferrier, Nottingham Oriana Choir, Boyd Neel String Orchestra

Source: Decca.

=== Other recordings ===
Henderson made studio recordings for EMI and other labels; these and recordings of him singing in live concerts and broadcasts have been issued, including:

Year	Composer	Title	With
1934	Delius	Songs of Sunset	Olga Haley (contralto), London Select Choir, London Philharmonic, Sir Thomas Beecham
1934	Delius	An Arabesque	London Select Choir, London Philharmonic, Sir Thomas Beecham
1935	Mozart	Le nozze di Figaro	Soloists, Chorus and Orchestra of the Glyndebourne Festival, Fritz Busch
1935	Mozart	Così fan tutte	Soloists, Chorus and Orchestra of the Glyndebourne Festival, Fritz Busch
1936	Mozart	Don Giovanni	Soloists, Chorus and Orchestra of the Glyndebourne Festival, Fritz Busch
1936	Vaughan Williams	Dona nobis pacem	BBC Symphony, the composer
1938	Vaughan Williams	Serenade to Music	BBC Symphony, Sir Henry Wood
1951	Vaughan Williams	Serenade to Music	Liverpool Philharmonic, the composer

Source: Naxos Music Library.

== Last years ==
Until his final years Henderson continued to teach, at his house in Belsize Park, London. He contributed reminiscences and comment to many BBC radio programmes in his retirement, including one in 1989 in which he and the two other surviving soloists (Note: The other two were Dame Eva Turner and Mary Jarred.) discussed the origins and premiere of the Serenade to Music half a century earlier, and another in 1991 in which he and Falkner were in conversation with Richard Baker about their long careers. To celebrate his hundredth birthday a compilation of his recordings was issued on compact disc, the earliest of them dating back to 1925.

Henderson died at the Musicians' Benevolent Fund nursing home, Ivor Newton House, Bromley, south-east London, on 16 March 2000, aged 100. He was survived by his son and one daughter; his wife and a daughter predeceased him.

== Notes, references and sources ==
=== Sources ===
==== Books ====
- Elkin, Robert (1944). Queen's Hall, 1893–1941. London: Rider. OCLC 636583612.
- Kennedy, Michael (1964). The Works of Ralph Vaughan Williams. Oxford: Oxford University Press. ISBN 978-0-19-315453-7.
- Kennedy, Michael (1971). Barbirolli, Conductor Laureate: The Authorised Biography. London: MacGibbon and Key. ISBN 978-0-261-63336-0.
- Moore, Gerald (1966) [1962]. Am I Too Loud?. London: Penguin. ISBN 978-0-14-002480-7.
- Vaughan Williams, Ralph (1961) [1938]. Serenade to Music. London: Oxford University Press. ISBN 978-0-19-339356-1.

==== Journals ====
- Lloyd, Stephen (Winter 1987). "Thus Spake Zarathustra: Roy Henderson in conversation". The Delius Society Journal (92): 3–11.
