= The Holy Boy =

Composition by John Ireland

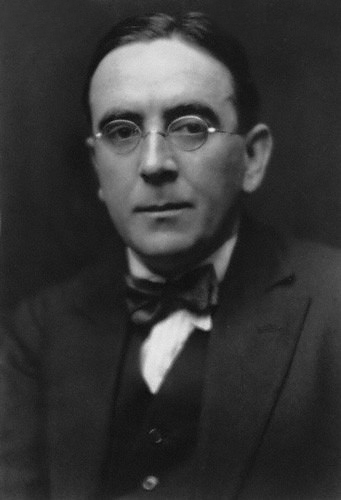
John Ireland, c. 1920

The Holy Boy is a short composition by the English composer John Ireland. Alongside his setting of the hymn "My Song Is Love Unknown", it is probably his best-known work. Originally for solo piano, Ireland arranged it for various other forces over nearly 30 years. A performance takes about 3 minutes.

The original version is from Christmas 1913, and was published in 1915 as The Holy Boy – A Carol, the third item in his four Preludes for Piano. It was composed while Ireland was the organist at St Luke's Church, Chelsea, inspired by a chorister at the church called Bobby Glassby, who became one of the composer's protégés. Andrew Burn suggests that a text by Harold Munro may have provided the title.

Musically, it features an ostensibly simple melody; but as with many of Ireland's works, the harmonic structure is more complex. His biographer Muriel Searle has said, "Simple to the point of austerity, The Holy Boy remains one of the public's favourite Ireland works." Burn writes, "With its wistful melody and subtle shifts of harmony it is quintessential Ireland".

== Arrangements ==
The following arrangements are by the composer except where specified.

- 1913: Piano.
- 1919: Organ, by Alec Rowley, Ireland's friend and fellow organist; subtitled A Carol of the Nativity, perhaps to encourage its inclusion in church services.
- 1919: Violin and piano.
- 1919: Cello and piano.
- 1925: Viola, by the violist Lionel Tertis.
- 1938: Voice and piano, with words ("Lowly, laid in a manger/With oxen brooding nigh") by Herbert S. Brown, Ireland's family solicitor.
- 1941: String orchestra.
- 1941: String quartet.
- 1941: Unaccompanied mixed chorus (SATB), using Brown's words, for the BBC Singers.
- 1950: Brass ensemble, by Robert E. Stepp.
- 1970: Two recorders, by G. Russell-Smith.
- 1987: Flute and piano, by the flute player James Galway.
- 1991: Brass band, by Eric Wilson.
- 1992?: Solo voice, choir and orchestra, by John Matarazzo (for the recording Christmas Classics with Julie Andrews)
- 1993: Solo cello and strings, by Christopher Palmer.
- 1993: Solo voice, choir and string orchestra, by Christopher Palmer.
