= Trental =

Trental may refer to:

- Trental, trade name of the drug pentoxifylline
- Trental, older name for the month's mind (thirty days of prayers for the dead)
