= The Almond Tree (John Ireland) =

Composition by John Ireland

The Almond Tree is a piece for piano solo composed in 1913 by John Ireland (1879–1962).

Fiona Richards compares The Almond Tree to another Ireland piece composed in the same year, "The Island Spell" from Decorations, because of its similar emphasis on "figuration, delicate textures and pentatonic melodies". The two pieces also share "careful and atmospheric use of the pedal", including the common instruction una corda.

A performance takes about 3½ minutes.
