= Sarnia (disambiguation) =

Sarnia is a city in Ontario, Canada.

Sarnia may also refer to:

== Places ==
- Sarnia—Lambton (federal electoral district), Ontario, Canada, formerly known as Sarnia, a federal electoral district
- Sarnia—Lambton (provincial electoral district), Ontario, Canada, a provincial electoral district
  - Sarnia (provincial electoral district), Ontario, a riding from 1966 to 1996, which was combined with part of Lambton to create the Sarnia—Lambton provincial electoral district
- Sarnia 45 Indian Reserve of the Aamjiwnaang First Nation, Ontario
- Rural Municipality of Sarnia No. 221, Saskatchewan, Canada
- Sarnia, the Roman name for the island of Guernsey, Channel Islands

== Sports in Sarnia, Ontario ==
- Sarnia Legionnaires (1954–70), a junior ice hockey team
- Sarnia Legionnaires (1969–), a junior ice hockey team
  - Sarnia Arena, home arena of the Legionnaires
- Sarnia Sting, a junior ice hockey team
- Sarnia Imperials, a football team from 1928 to 1955

== Other uses ==
- HMCS Sarnia, a Second World War Royal Canadian Navy minesweeper
- SS Sarnia (1910), a passenger vessel which also served in the First World War as HMS Sarnia
- Sarnia station, Sarnia, Ontario, a Via Rail train station
- Sarnia Chris Hadfield Airport, near Sarnia, Ontario
- Sarnia: An Island Sequence, a set of three piano solo pieces by John Ireland
- Sarnia, a novel by British author John Christopher (pen name of Samuel Youd)
