= Songs of a Wayfarer =

Song cycle for baritone and piano composed by John Ireland

Songs of a Wayfarer is a song cycle for baritone and piano composed by John Ireland (1879–1962) between 1903 and c.1911, and published in 1912. It consists of settings of five poems by various poets.

A performance takes about 12 minutes. The songs are:

1. "Memory" (William Blake (1757–1827); "Memory, hither come", from Poetical Sketches (1783))
2. "When Daffodils Begin to Peer" (William Shakespeare (1564–1616); from A Winter's Tale, Act IV, Scene 3)
3. "English May" (Dante Gabriel Rossetti (1828–82); from The Collected Works of Dante Gabriel Rossetti, Vol. I (1886))
4. "I Was Not Sorrowful" (Ernest Dowson (1867–1900); "Spleen", from Verses (1896))
5. "I Will Walk on the Earth" (James Vila Blake (1842–1925))

In 1919, Edwin Evans described the cycle as being "of unequal merit but containing at least one song worthy to rank with its successors". In 2007, Richard Nicholson in a review of the recording by Benjamin Luxon (baritone) and Alan Rowlands (piano) (1972 or 1973) remarked that the songs "clearly have a foot in the nineteenth-century, with the influence of Brahms and Stanford acutely felt, but they show any amount of artistic promise".
