= Ballade of London Nights =

Ballade of London Nights is a solo piano work composed in 1930 by John Ireland but not finished. The manuscript was completed after his death by Alan Rowlands, who first performed it on 6 June 1965. Rowlands advocated repeating the opening section to create a satisfactory ending.

The title was probably influenced by Arthur Symons' 1895 poetry collection Days and Nights, which includes similar themes of wandering in the city. Fiona Richards describes the Ballade as "a mingling of images, a song of London nights spent both in Chelsea and in Soho, nights which move from tranquility into chaos". It is one of several London-inspired works by Ireland, the others being the three London Pieces (1917–20) for piano and the orchestral London Overture (1936).

A performance takes about seven minutes.
