= Bergamasca =

Bergamasca is an Italian adjective meaning "of/from the town of Bergamo" in Northern Italy. In English, it may refer to:

- Bergamasca, the regional language, called Bergamasque in English
- Bergamasca, a dance and associated melody and chord progression from the region, usually spelled Bergamask in English
- Bergamasca sheep, a domestic breed from the region
