= Kenneth Anthony Wright =

British composer and conductor

Kenneth Anthony Wright (East Tuddenham, 5 June 1899 – London, 15 January 1975) was a British composer and conductor.

== Life ==
Wright studied mechanical and electrical engineering at the University of Sheffield in Sheffield. As a technician he got a job with the British Broadcasting Corporation (BBC) and from 1922 to 1959 he was a member of the music department of the BBC in London. In 1922 he became the first director of the BBC in Manchester. From 1923 to 1930 he became personal assistant to Percy Pitt. From 1930 to 1937 he was the personal assistant to Sir Adrian Boult. He went on to conduct BBC orchestras, was Overseas Music Director (1940-3), Deputy Director Of Music (1944-7) and Acting Director in 1947 for a time after Victor Hely-Hutchinson's death, Artists' Manager (1948–51) and Head of TV Music from 1951 to 1959. After reaching the BBC compulsory retirement age of 60, he was the director of the Robert Maxwell Film Companies.

As a conductor and composer he played wind music and had pieces dedicated to him, including A Downland Suite by John Ireland. He composed works for various ensembles, such as orchestras, wind bands (military bands), brass bands and wrote works until shortly before his death.

== Compositions ==
=== Works for orchestra ===
- Bohemia, fantasy
- Daddy Long-Legs
- Dainty Lady, intermezzo
- Dancing with the Daffodils
- Perky Pizzicato, for strings
- Scherzo - on a Newfoundland song
- The Killigrew's Soirée
- Tobacco Suite
  1. Military Shag, march
  2. Old Havana, tango
  3. Snuff, scherzo
  4. Virginia, lullaby
  5. Irish Twist

=== Works for wind orchestras and brass bands ===
- 1935 Pride of Race, suite ( featured at the National Brass Band Championships in 1935 and at the Open Brass Band Championships in 1945)
- 1936 Homage to Liszt
- 1938 Irish Merry
- 1944 Peddars' Way
- 1968 Dancing Valley
- 1968 The Killigrew's Soirée
- 1971 A Rhapsody for Leicastershire

=== Chamber music ===
- The Brushwood Squirrel, for violin and piano

=== Works for Piano ===
- Six Fantasy Pictures from a Pantomime, suite
