= Lolly Willowes =

1926 novel by Sylvia Townsend Warner

- First US edition
- Author: Sylvia Townsend Warner
- Language: English
- Genre: Fantasy, Satire
- Publisher: Chatto & Windus (UK); Viking Press (US)
- Publication date: 1926
- Publication place: United Kingdom
- Media type: Print (hardback & paperback)
- Text: Lolly Willowes at Wikisource

Lolly Willowes; or The Loving Huntsman is a novel by English writer Sylvia Townsend Warner, her first, published in 1926. It has been described as an early feminist classic. It is a satirical social novel with fantastic elements, set in England at the beginning of the 20th century. It deals with the social restrictions on women as well as alternative ways of living during the interwar period.

== Synopsis ==
Lolly Willowes is a satirical comedy of manners incorporating elements of fantasy. It is the story of a middle-aged spinster who moves to a country village to escape her controlling relatives and takes up the practice of witchcraft. The novel opens at the turn of the twentieth century, with Laura Willowes moving from Somerset to London to live with her brother Henry and his family. The move comes in the wake of the death of Laura's father, Everard, with whom she lived at the family home, Lady Place. Laura's other brother, James, moves into Lady Place with his wife and his young son, Titus, with the intention to continue the family's brewing business. However, James dies suddenly of a heart attack and Lady Place is rented out, with the view that Titus, once grown up, will return to the home and run the business.

After twenty years of being a live-in aunt Laura finds herself feeling increasingly stifled both by her obligations to the family and by living in London. When shopping for flowers on the Moscow Road, Laura decides she wishes to move to the Chiltern Hills and, buying a guide book and map to the area, she picks the village of Great Mop as her new home. Against the wishes of her extended family, Laura moves to Great Mop and finds herself entranced and overwhelmed by the chalk hills and beech woods. Though sometimes disturbed by strange noises at night, she settles in and befriends her landlady and a poultry farmer.

After a while, Titus decides to move from his lodgings in Bloomsbury to Great Mop and be a writer, rather than managing the family business. Titus's renewed social and domestic reliance on Laura make her feel frustrated that even living in the Chilterns she cannot escape the duties expected of women. When out walking, she makes a pact with a force that she takes to be Satan, to be free from such duties. On returning to her lodgings, she discovers a kitten, whom she takes to be Satan's emissary, and names him Vinegar, in reference to an old picture of witches' familiars. Subsequently, her landlady takes her to a Witches' Sabbath attended by many of the villagers.

Titus is plagued with misadventures, such as having his milk constantly curdle and falling into a nest of wasps. Finally, he proposes marriage to a London visitor, Pandora Williams, who has treated his wasp stings, and the two retreat to London. Laura, relieved, meets Satan at Mulgrave Folly and tells him that women are like 'sticks of dynamite' waiting to explode and that all women are witches even 'if they never do anything with their witchcraft, they know it's there – ready!' The novel ends with Laura acknowledging that her new freedom comes at the expense of knowing that she belongs to the 'satisfied but profoundly indifferent ownership' of Satan.

== Themes ==
The portrayal of Laura Willowes' rebellion against the limitations of her life circumstances reflects a societal shift in gender roles at the time the novel was written. In the interwar period, the question of women's position moved to the center of national discourse. On one hand, the introduction of women's suffrage recognized women's claim to participation in political public life. On the other hand, women faced considerable pressure to return to traditional role distributions after the war. The tasks taken over outside the domestic sphere during the war were to be reserved exclusively for returning men again. Laura connects the reduction of her personality to her function as Aunt Lolly with the move to London. She perceives the urban existence, characterized by domesticity and compulsory heterosexuality, as constraining and oppressive.

== Biographical parallels ==
Laura Willowes and Sylvia Townsend Warner share several characteristics: the eventual retreat to a rural environment after years in London but also the rejection of a conventional life design. At the time the novel was written, Townsend Warner was having an affair with the older, married Percy Buck. While the relationship itself, according to Townsend Warner's diary entries, often gave cause for frustration on an emotional level, it at least guaranteed liberation from traditional female roles in terms of motherhood and hostess duties. It is not inconceivable that Townsend Warner saw in the design of a life free from family entanglements a preview of her own future. The general mood of the novel with regard to this perspective gives the impression of anticipation.

Townsend Warner's later relationship with Valentine Ackland suggests a lesbian interpretation of certain passages. This aspect becomes most evident in the description of a witches' Sabbath to which Laura is invited. Various villagers ask Laura to dance but meet with little reciprocation. Laura is reminded of the boring balls of her youth and disappointedly notes that such conventions cannot arouse her interest even in the context of a witches' Sabbath. Only the dance with the young village beauty Emily tears Laura from her apathy for a moment. When a lock of Emily's red hair comes loose and brushes across Laura's face, Laura feels a tingling all over her body. Laura, who hates balls, finds she could dance until exhaustion with Emily.

== Form ==
The novel begins as a realistic narrative and eventually gains a fantastic dimension. When Laura, pressured by Titus, gives vent to her soul during a walk through the woods, and calls out her denial of social expectations into the wilderness, she conjures up the devil. Through her word, he becomes reality. The devil thus becomes the embodiment of the methods by which discourses establish realities, define their meaning, and model reactions. He symbolizes the complicated interplay between text and reality.

On a formal level, the novel ends not only as fantasy but also as polemic. While Laura's thoughts are previously predominantly rendered in the form of free indirect speech, on the last pages she explicitly formulates her worldview in detail. While Laura initially just wants her peace and shows no great curiosity for the lives of the other village women, she now identifies with other women in her situation and places herself in a line of witches – like her, wives and sisters of respectable men – who see in the pact with the devil the best chance for freedom, self-determination, and adventure.

== Position in literary history ==
Laura Willowes' rejection of her confined and heteronomous existence in the city in favour of a new life in harmony with nature in a village full of witches corresponds to the contemporary interest in a return to an earth-bound, rural way of life. Similar themes can also be found in the works of Mary Webb and D.H. Lawrence. Laura's process of self-discovery under the guidance of a satanic hunter shows parallels to Connie Chatterley's sexual awakening through Mellors.

Literature with fantastic elements was very popular in the 1920s. Further examples of this trend are David Garnett's "Lady Into Fox" (1922), Virginia Woolf's "Orlando" (1928), and Rebecca West's "Harriet Hume" (1929).

== Reception and legacy ==
The novel was well received by critics on its publication. In France it was shortlisted for the Prix Femina and in the USA it was the very first Book Of The Month for the Book Club.

Composer John Ireland based the last movement of his 1926-7 Sonatina for piano on the novel.

Until the 1960s, the manuscript of Lolly Willowes was displayed in the New York Public Library.

In a 1999 introduction to the novel's republication by New York Review Books, Alison Lurie wrote that "a woman who refuses the 'Aunt Lolly' role is, in the view of conventional society, a kind of witch, even if she does no evil," tying the novel to Virginia Woolf's A Room of One's Own, noting that Warner "had spoken for [such women] first."

Similarly, in her 2012 review of the novel, Lucy Scholes takes note of the feminist focus of the novel, as well as the fact that it predates the better known A Room of One's Own: "With its clear feminist agenda, Lolly Willowes holds its own among Townsend Warner's historical fiction, but it's also an elegantly enchanting tale that transcends its era."

In 2014, Robert McCrum chose it as one of the 100 Best Novels in English, for his list for The Guardian.

== See also ==
- Devil in the arts and popular culture
- Vinegar Tom, a 1976 feminist play about witchcraft
