= Preludes for Piano (John Ireland) =

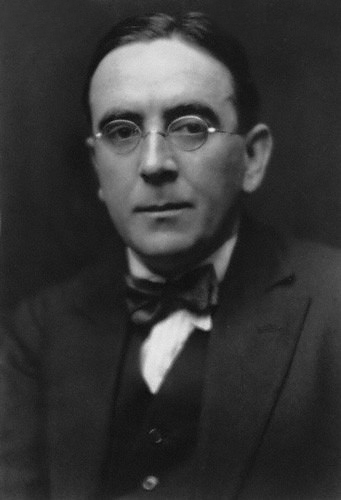
John Ireland, c. 1920

Preludes for Piano is a set of four short pieces for piano solo composed by John Ireland between 1913 and 1915. They were published in 1915.

The pieces, with typical timings, are:

1. The Undertone (3 minutes)
2. Obsession (3 minutes)
3. The Holy Boy (composed on Christmas Day 1913; subtitled A Carol of the Nativity; 4 minutes)
4. Fire of Spring (2 minutes)

The Undertone, written in January 2014, is in 5/8 meter throughout. Edwin Evans described it as consisting of "a two bar phrase treated as an ostinato with great harmonic variety but consistently in one definite mood. In its way it is a miniature tour de force."

Obsession, it has been suggested, reflects Ireland's anger at the waste of war. Alan Rowlands detects the influence of Richard Strauss in "the strange bitonal discord Eb/C major, which haunts Elektra." It is marked Allegro con moto.

The Holy Boy is one of Ireland's best-known works, along with his setting of the hymn "My Song Is Love Unknown". It has been arranged for a variety of forces. One version is the Christmas carol "Lowly, laid in a manger / With oxen brooding nigh" with words by Herbert S. Brown.

Fire of Spring was described by Evans as "a rhapsodical outburst."
