= Eric Thirkell Cooper =

British soldier and war poet

Eric Thirkell Cooper (1886–1960) was a British soldier and war poet during World War I.

Cooper was born in 1886 in Beckenham, Kent. He served with the Royal Fusiliers (City of London Regiment), reaching the rank of Major. He published two collections of poems: Soliloquies of a Subaltern Somewhere in France (1915) and Tommies of the Line, and Other Poems (1918).

In 1916, the English composer John Ireland (1879–1962) published settings of three poems from Soliloquies of a Subaltern for voice and piano: "Blind" and "The Cost" in a set called Two Songs; and, separately, "Lines to a Garrison Churchyard", under the title "A Garrison Churchyard". In the same year, the English composer Cyril Scott (1879–1970) also published a setting of that last poem, under the title "Garrison Churchyard".
