= Two Pieces for Piano (1921, John Ireland) =

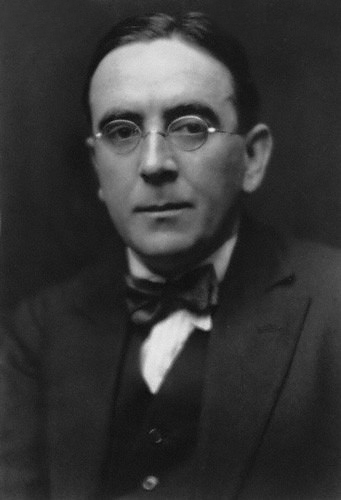
John Ireland, c. 1920

Two Pieces for Piano is a work for piano solo composed in 1921 by John Ireland (1879–1962).

A performance of both pieces takes about 7 minutes. They are:

1. For Remembrance
2. Amberley Wild Brooks

Amberley Wild Brooks is an area of marshland on the River Arun, West Sussex, England, well known for its wildlife and natural beauty. Ireland lived much of his life in Sussex and frequently took inspiration for his music from nature and the natural landscape of Southern England, for example in other pieces such as A Downland Suite.

The music is impressionistic in style, influenced by the piano works of Debussy and Ravel, in particular the latter's Jeux d'eau. There are two main themes, a gently meandering melody in A major and a heroic horn-call in F. The music builds swiftly to a climax of cascading arpeggios before a return to the tranquillity of the opening. The writing for piano is colourful and effective; it is one of Ireland's most popular and frequently performed piano pieces.

== See also ==
- Music of Sussex
