= Mother and Child (song cycle) =

Song cycle composed in 1918 by John Ireland

Mother and Child is a song cycle for soprano and piano composed in 1918 by John Ireland (1879–1962). It consists of settings of eight poems by Christina Rossetti (1830–94), from her collection Sing-Song: A Nursery Rhyme Book (1872, 1893).

A typical performance takes about 10 minutes. The songs are:

1. "Newborn"
2. "The Only child"
3. "Hope"
4. "Skylark and Nightingale"
5. "The Blind Boy"
6. "Baby"
7. "Death Parting"
8. "The Garland"
