= Mai-Dun =

1921 orchestral work by John Ireland

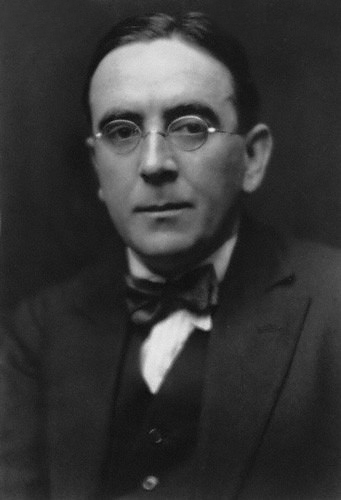
John Ireland, c. 1920

Mai-Dun is an orchestral work composed in 1921 by John Ireland (1879–1962). He called it a symphonic rhapsody; another description might be tone poem. In 1931, he arranged it for piano four hands.

In British Celtic, "Mai-dun" means "great hill". Ireland's piece is a musical evocation of a notable iron age fort: Maiden Castle, Dorset, nearby the house of the English novelist and poet Thomas Hardy (1840–1928) whose name for the place Ireland adopted. It is believed to have been inspired by Arthur Machen's novel The Hill of Dreams (1907).

It has been said that, "ancient sites with echoes of the supernatural, including the Channel Islands, inform some of Ireland’s few orchestral pieces"; and of Mai-Dun itself that, "it is a strong piece, aggressive at times, resourcefully scored, and Ireland’s imagination was ignited by the largest hill-fort in England, dating from 3000BC, and its violent history."

A typical performance takes about 12½ minutes.
