= Piano Concerto (John Ireland) =

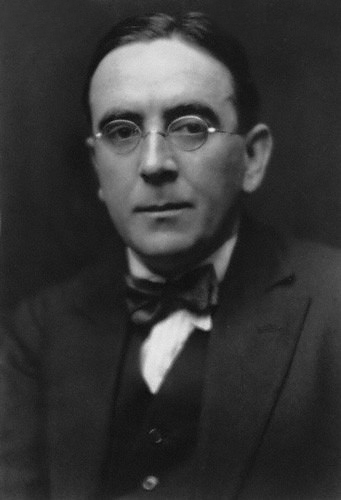
John Ireland, c. 1920

The Piano Concerto in E♭ was John Ireland's only concerto. It was composed in 1930 and given its first performance on 2 October of that year by its dedicatee Helen Perkin at a Promenade Concert in the Queen's Hall. The work was an immediate success and was frequently performed by pianists such as Clifford Curzon, Moura Lympany, Eileen Joyce, Gina Bachauer and Arthur Rubinstein. While it is considered one of the best piano concertos ever written by an Englishman, it is not often heard nowadays and is not part of the standard repertoire.

== History ==
Encouraged by its success, Ireland planned to write a second concerto, but he only completed one movement, which he called Legend. This was also dedicated to Helen Perkin and she performed it for the first time on 12 January 1934, with the BBC Symphony Orchestra conducted by Adrian Boult.

Ireland was romantically interested in Perkin, but these feelings were not reciprocated. Perkin took up with George Mountford Adie (1901–89), an architect and a disciple of George Gurdjieff, later marrying him and moving with him to Australia. As a result, Ireland withdrew the dedications of both works.

Helen Perkin had played Prokofiev's Piano Concerto No. 3 at the Royal College of Music, and it is likely Ireland heard this performance and was influenced by the Russian's work. He had not, however, heard Ravel's G major Concerto since it did not appear until after Ireland's concerto was published. It is puzzling, therefore, that many commentators see echoes in Ireland's concerto not only of Prokofiev's concerto but also of Ravel's concerto. In its jazzy rhythms, there are also hints of George Gershwin.

The first person to record the Piano Concerto was Eileen Joyce, in 1942, with the Hallé Orchestra under Leslie Heward. She was also the soloist when the concerto was played at a special Proms concert in 1949, to celebrate Ireland's 70th birthday (this performance was also recorded, and released commercially). After the concert, Eileen Joyce and her partner took Ireland to dinner, and Percy Grainger also attended. The concerto was again played at Ireland's 80th birthday concert. It has also been recorded by Eric Parkin (twice), Piers Lane, Kathryn Stott, Colin Horsley, Geoffrey Tozer, Mark Bebbington (as part of his complete John Ireland piano music edition) and John Lenehan.

== Music ==
The Piano Concerto is in three movements, with the slow movement leading directly into the finale without a break. Ireland is said to have included a quotation from Helen Perkin's Phantasy String Quartet, which won a Cobbett Prize for composition earlier that year. But Perkin herself said it was "more a reminiscence than a direct quotation".

== Sources ==
- Hyperion Records: The Romantic Piano Concerto, Vol. 39 – Delius & Ireland
- Alan Bush Music Trust: The Correspondence of Alan Bush and John Ireland
- Review of Piers Lane recording
