= Rock Mill, Washington =

Windmill in Washington, West Sussex, UK

Washington Windmill
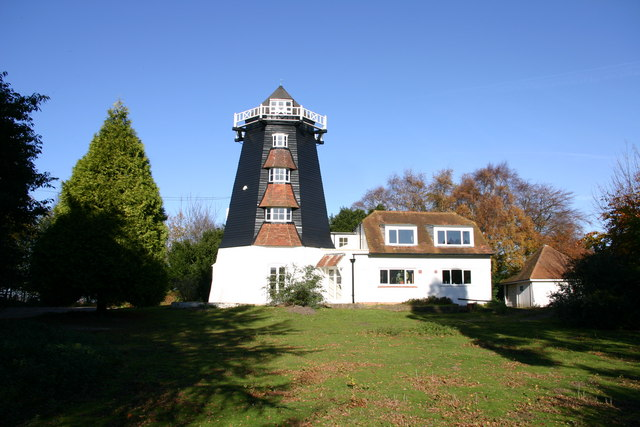
- The mill in 2005

Origin
- Mill name: Rock Mill
- Grid reference: TQ 128 137
- Coordinates: 50°54′42″N 0°23′48″W
- Operator(s): Private
- Year built: 1823

Information
- Purpose: Corn mill
- Type: Smock mill
- Storeys: Three store smock
- Base storeys: Single-storey base
- Smock sides: Eight sides
- No. of sails: Four sails
- Type of sails: Patent sails (missing)
- Winding: Fantail (missing)
- No. of pairs of millstones: Three pairs

Listed Building – Grade II
- Official name: Rock Windmill
- Designated: 24 February 1977
- Reference no.: 1354092

Rock Mill is a Grade II listed smock mill at Washington, West Sussex, England, which has been converted to residential use.

== History ==
Rock Mill was built in 1823. The mill was working at the outbreak of the First World War but was converted to a house in about 1919, using the machinery as decoration. The composer John Ireland bought the mill in 1953 and died there in 1962. As of 2007, the mill is used as offices.

== Description ==
Rock Mill is a three-storey smock mill on a single-storey base, formerly carrying a beehive cap winded by a fantail. It had four Patent sails and drove three pairs of millstones (two pairs French Burr and one pair of Peak stones).

== Millers ==
- Thomas Harwood, 1837
- Henry Harwood, 1837-40
- E. Mitchell, 1845-55
- S.A. Coote, 1890
