= Three Pastels =

Piano compositions by John Ireland

Three Pastels is a set of three pieces for piano solo composed in 1941 by John Ireland.

A performance of all three pieces takes about 9 minutes. They are:

1. A Grecian Lad
2. The Boy Bishop
3. Puck's Birthday

A pastel is an artwork made using a colouring medium in the form of a stick which consists of powdered pigment and a binder; the stick too is called a pastel. Pastel drawings are often delicate in tone, which may explain Ireland's choice of title for this set of gentle impressionistic pieces.

The title A Grecian Lad may have been taken from A. E. Housman's poem "Look not in my eyes, for fear", No. XV in his 1896 collection A Shropshire Lad. It refers to the Greek legend of Narcissus, who fell in love with his own reflection:

A Grecian lad, as I hear tell,
One that many loved in vain,
Looked into a forest well
And never looked away again.
There, when the turf in springtime flowers,
With downward eye and gazes sad,
Stands amid the glancing showers
A jonquil, not a Grecian lad.

The jonquil is a species of narcissus, Narcissus jonquilla.

In the Middle Ages, it was a widespread custom to appoint a boy bishop, for example from among cathedral choristers, to parody the actual bishop on some particular church feast day.

Puck is a mischievous supernatural creature in Celtic folklore. He is perhaps best known from the character Puck in Shakespeare's play A Midsummer Night's Dream.
