= The Towing Path =

Composition by John Ireland

The Towing Path is a piece for piano solo composed in 1918 by John Ireland.

A performance takes about 4 minutes.

A towing path is a road or track on the bank of a river, canal, or other inland waterway. Its purpose is to allow a land vehicle, beasts of burden, or a team of human pullers to tow a boat, often a barge.
