= Sonatina (John Ireland) =

1926-7 musical composition by John Ireland

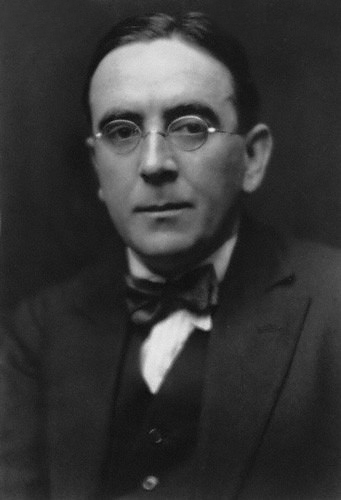
John Ireland, c. 1920

Sonatina is a work for piano solo in three movements composed in 1926–27 by John Ireland (1879–1962). He dedicated it to his friend, the conductor and BBC music producer, Edward Clark.

A performance takes about 10½ minutes. The movements are marked:

1. Moderato
2. Quasi lento
3. Rondo. Ritmico, non troppo allegro

The term sonatina has no single strict definition, but is rather a title applied by the composer to a piece in basic sonata form which is shorter and lighter in character, or technically more elementary, than a typical sonata.

The dates given at the end of the score ('Begun, June 1926: finished, October 1927') suggest that the work cost Ireland some considerable effort despite its brevity. The writing is extremely dense, even by Ireland's standards, and experimental in both its harmonic language and form.

John Longmire relates that the 'CAD' motive in the second theme of the first movement refers to the composer Arnold Bax. Ireland had a strong affection for Faery, the younger daughter of the Hutchesons of the White House, Great Sampford. Arnold Bax 'appeared on the scene and stole her affection from him'. Ireland's revenge was this theme. Despite his offence at Bax's behaviour, the two composers remained friends.

The Rondo was used as a test piece in the 1928 Daily Express Piano Competition, which was won by Cyril Smith. It had been recorded by William Murdoch as a guide to competitors. Lewis Foreman has written, "that Ireland even then recognised the piano not only for its romantic and singing qualities, but also - almost Bartók like - as a percussion instrument".

The last movement was based on Sylvia Townsend Warner's novel, Lolly Willowes (1926). It recounts the tale of a spinster who renounces her city life with relatives in London to move to the village of Great Mop, where she forges a pact with the devil and becomes a witch. She is invited to a witches' sabbath where 'they whirled faster and faster, fused together like two suns that whirl and blaze in a single destruction'. In a letter to Jocelyn Brooke, Ireland wrote that 'Sylvia Townsend Warner has something in "Lolly Willowes"... But she tinges nearly all with an underlying irony which is sometimes stimulating but often destructive'.

== See also ==
- Glossary of musical terminology for explanations of the movement markings.
