= Helen Perkin =

English pianist and composer (1909–1996)

Helen Craddock Perkin (25 February 1909 – 19 October 1996) was an English pianist and composer, best known today for her association with John Ireland during the late 1920s and early 1930s.

== Early career ==
Perkin was born in Hackney, London, the youngest of six children. Her mother was a pianist, and from the age of 11 she took lessons from Arthur Alexander. At 16 she entered the Royal College of Music, continuing her lessons with Alexander, and subsequently (through the Octavia Travelling Scholarship), studied orchestration with Anton Webern in Vienna and piano with Eduard Steuermann.

She first took composition lessons from John Ireland in 1927. Sylvia Townsend Warner observed her turn the pages for Ireland at a BBC performance of his Sonatina in April 1928, describing her as "a very beautiful serious child". In 1930 she won the Cobbett Competition with her one movement Phantasy Quartet. That year she was the soloist in Prokofiev's Third Piano Concerto at the RCM, conducted by Malcolm Sargent. By then she was broadcasting regularly as a pianist, with a repertoire that soon stretched from Haydn and Schubert through to Ibert, Ravel, Berg and Egon Wellesz.

Meanwhile, Ireland was working on his own piano concerto with Perkin in mind as the soloist. He dedicated his Piano Concerto in E♭ to her and she performed its premiere on 30 October 1930 at the Queen's Hall Proms. There are musical references to her Phantasy Quartet in the first movement. She was also the soloist for the first performance of Ireland's Legend in 1934, again at Queen's Hall.

== Break with John Ireland and wartime ==
Fiona Richards suggests that Ireland's relationship with Perkin was "a demanding and possessive one", and she later confessed "the situation became so impossible that a break had to be made". The rift was hastened by her marriage in 1935 to the avant garde architect George Mountford Adie (1901–1989), after which the two ceased to communicate for many years. Ireland eventually removed the dedication to her in the score of the Piano Concerto, and wrote her increasingly vitriolic letters in the 1950s.

Three children were born before 1940. During this period she and her husband met the Russian esotericist P D Ouspensky and became followers. During the war Perkin concentrated on bringing up her children. Although she revived both her composition and performing careers after the war, the long break did affect the scope of her opportunities when compared to higher profile contemporaries such as Eileen Joyce and Myra Hess.

== Composer ==
Perkin began gaining notice as a composer from 1928, when her Theme and Variations for piano was broadcast on BBC Radio. She was 19. The following year her prize-winning Phantasy Quartet was performed by the eminent Spencer Dyke Quartet. A Piano Trio followed in 1931, performed at the Societe National in Paris. Her Episode for piano was performed at the Winter Proms on 2 January 1936, with Perkin as soloist. In 1937 a concert of her chamber music was broadcast by the BBC, including the Piano Trio, the Four Preludes for piano (1933) and Spring Rhapsody for violin and piano, with soloist Antonio Brosa. Her Piano Sonata also received its premiere at Queen's Hall in October 1937. There were further large scale piano works after the war, including Eleven Impressions (1947).

Other works include two string quartets, and a Cello Sonata in E♭ (1957) with a Serenade movement in five-eight time, performed and broadcast several times with cellist Florence Hooton. The three movement suite for piano Village Fair (1934) is an example of her lighter music. She also composed for film and television (such as The Inward Eye, 1955) and two children's ballets for television, Calamity at Court (1955) and The Wonder Bird (1961), both with choreographer Nesta Brooking (1906–2006). As with John Ireland, Perkin turned to composing for brass band in her later years with three suites that were used as test pieces: Carnival, (1957), Cordell Suite (1959), and Island Heritage (1962).

== Later career ==
After World War II Helen Perkin and her husband visited the Russian mystic George Gurdjieff in Paris. Following the death of Ouspensky in 1947 they were increasingly active in the Gurdjieff spiritual movement, first in London (where a fellow member of the movement was Jane Heap), and (from 1965) in Sydney, Australia, where they emigrated and remained for the rest of their lives. They established the Gurdjieff Society of Newport. Recordings of her playing music for Gurdjieff by Thomas de Hartmann were issued on CD under the name Helen Adie. But she was also a Movements teacher and composed music for the Movements as well. Some of this music has been published and privately circulated.

George and Helen Adie were depicted as the fictional characters Mr and Mrs Todd Ashby in Carl Ginsburg's Medicine Journeys: Ten Stories (Center Press, 1983), specifically the story 'The Daphne Blossom'. George Adie died in 1989. Perkin died in Sydney seven years later, aged 88.
