= Month's Mind (John Ireland) =

Month's Mind is a piece for piano solo composed in 1935 by John Ireland.

The manuscript, published by Augener, is headed by a quotation from John Brand’s Observations on Popular Antiquities (1777).

…days which our ancestors called their ‘Month’s Mind’, as being the special days whereon their souls (after death) were had in special remembrance – hence the expression of ‘having a Month’s Mind’, to imply a longing desire.

According to Philip R Buttall, this piece "encapsulates the quite individual harmonic language of the composer, bitter-sweet with its fair share of dissonance, but never added for mere effect alone".

A performance takes about 4½ minutes.
