= Frederick Thurston =

English clarinettist (1901–1953)

- Born: 21 September 1901
- Origin: Lichfield, Staffordshire, England
- Died: 12 December 1953 (aged 52)
- Genre: Classical
- Instrument: Clarinet
- Years active: 1920s–1953

Frederick John Thurston (21 September 1901 – 12 December 1953) was an English clarinettist.

== Career ==
From the age of 7, he was taught by his father, and he won an open scholarship to the Royal College of Music, becoming a pupil of Charles Draper. In March 1922, he performed Stanford's Clarinet Concerto at the RCM, receiving critical acclaim in the press and a (rare) congratulatory telegram from the composer. The performance launched his career.

During the 1920s, he played with the orchestra of the Royal Opera House, and with Stanton Jeffries organized the earliest 2LO radio broadcasts of music from Marconi House in 1922. This helped lead to his appointment as principal clarinettist of the BBC's Wireless Orchestra in 1929, and then at the newly formed BBC Symphony Orchestra in 1930.

He left the BBC Symphony Orchestra in 1946 to concentrate on chamber music. He was principal clarinetist of the Philharmonia Orchestra and can be heard on the Toscanini recording of the Brahms Symphonies.

He gave the first performances of many new works, including Arnold Bax's Clarinet Sonata, Arthur Bliss's Clarinet Quintet and Gerald Finzi's Clarinet Concerto, and a private performance of Roger Fiske's 1941 Clarinet Sonata. Works dedicated to him include Malcolm Arnold's Clarinet Concerto No 1, Roger Fiske's Clarinet Sonata, Iain Hamilton's Three Nocturnes, Herbert Howells's Clarinet Sonata, John Ireland's Fantasy-Sonata, Gordon Jacob's Clarinet Quintet, Elizabeth Maconchy's Clarinet Concertino #1, Alan Rawsthorne's Clarinet Concerto and Freda Swain's Rhapsody.

He taught at the Royal College of Music from 1930 to 1953. In 1953, he married Thea King (later Dame Thea King), one of his pupils, but died in London later in the year on December 12th from lung cancer.

Thurston can be heard on Historical Clarinet Recordings (Vols. 1 and 2) on the Victoria Soames Samek's Clarinet Classics CD Label.

== Writings ==
- Thurston, Frederick; A. Frank (1979) [1939]. The Clarinet: a Comprehensive Tutor for the Boehm Clarinet. London.
- Thurston, Frederick (1940–41). "Clarinet Tone". Woodwind Year Book: 47ff.
- Thurston, Frederick (1956). Clarinet Technique. London. ISBN 0-19-318603-9.
- The Passage Studies Volume 1 ( Boosey & Hawkes )
- The Passage Studies Volume 2 ( Boosey & Hawkes )
- The Passage Studies Volume 3 ( Boosey & Hawkes )
