= First Rhapsody (John Ireland) =

First Rhapsody is a piece for piano solo by the English composer John Ireland.

A performance takes about 12 minutes.

The John Ireland Trust records the year of composition as 1905 and the key as C-sharp minor. Allmusic (a derivative source), says 1905–06 and C-sharp major. The premiere recording (Mark Bebbington, 2010) says 1906 and C-sharp major. (Note: The work may have been begun in 1905 and finished in 1906. The work may be bitonal, in C-sharp major/minor. In the absence of conclusive evidence, Bebbington's information has been adopted for the purpose of Wikipedia categorisation.)

According to Andrew Achenbach, writing in Gramophone Awards Issue 2010, the work had "languished undiscovered in the papers of Bruce Phillips (chairman of the John Ireland Trust). The engraver’s markings on the manuscript suggest that this ripely romantic outpouring was at one stage intended for publication, but the self-critical composer evidently had second thoughts". Mark Kennedy, writing in the Sunday Telegraph (August 2010), remarked, "why Ireland withheld it for so long isn’t evident from the quality of the music".
