= The Darkened Valley =

The Darkened Valley is a piece for piano solo composed in 1920 by John Ireland.

The title is derived from a William Blake quotation: "Walking along the darkened valley With silent Melancholy". Keith Anderson describes the piece as in "a poignant mood, lightened by a central passage in the major".

A performance takes about 3½ minutes.
