= Ballad (John Ireland) =

Ballad (sometimes called Ballade) is a piece for piano solo composed in 1929 by John Ireland.

The piece, says Julian Hellaby, goes beyond the usual stereotype of English pastoralism often associated with Ireland's music. It explores "an array of moods, topics and emotions that are a long way from pastoralism, and it also features a structural economy and directional intensity which place the work in the tradition of 19th-century musical narration".

A performance takes about 10 minutes.
