= Cello Sonata (Ireland) =

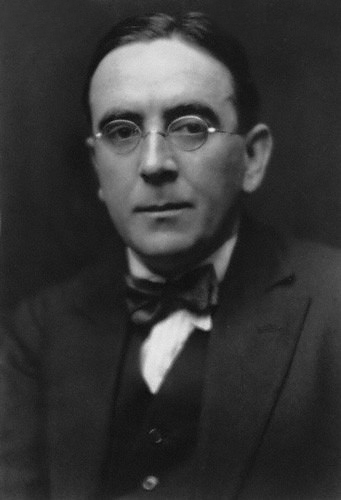
John Ireland, c. 1920

The Cello Sonata in G minor is a work by John Ireland, composed in 1923 and premiered on 4 April 1924 by Beatrice Harrison and pianist Evlyn Howard-Jones at the Aeolian Hall, London. Harrison then performed it again at the Salzburg ISCM Festival in August the same year. Ireland subsequently performed and recorded the Sonata for Columbia Records in 1928 with Antoni Sala. Lionel Tertis made an arrangement for viola in 1941 and played it with Ireland at one of the wartime National Gallery concerts that year.

There are three movements: Moderato e sostenuto (which begins quietly but with an important four-note motif that informs the rest of the work); Poco largamente, a lyrical, pastoral movement in the key of E♭; and (without a break) the lively Con moto e marcato, returning to G minor. Performances typically last between 20 and 25 minutes.

Sala described it as "the best cello sonata of modern times". Pablo Casals also thought highly of the piece, but political circumstances prevented him performing it at the time. Ireland had previously written two violin sonatas and a piano sonata. This was his only major composition of 1923.
