= Bergamask =

Dance and associated melody and chord progression

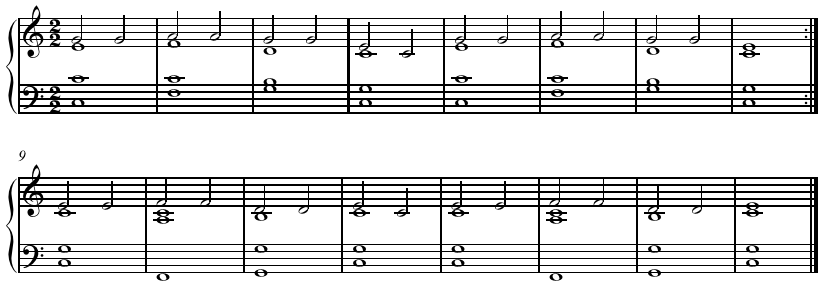
Bergamesca ('The Buffens'), Straloch MS., c. 1600.

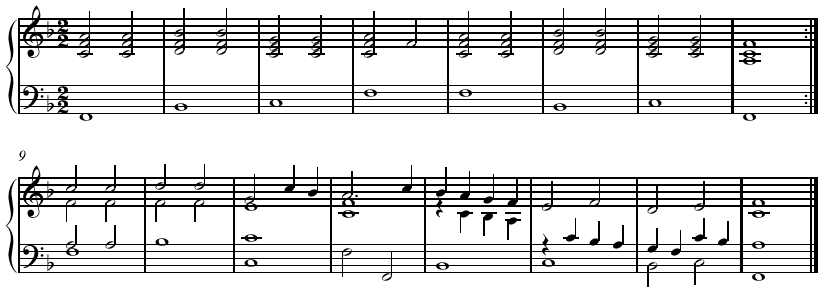
Bergamesca variant, MS. Lute Book, c. 1600.

Bergamask, bergomask, bergamesca, or bergamasca (from the town of Bergamo in Northern Italy), is a dance and associated melody and chord progression.

== Reputation ==
It was considered a clumsy rustic dance copied from the natives of Bergamo, reputed, according to the Encyclopædia Britannica Eleventh Edition, to be very awkward in their manners.

The dance is associated with clowns or buffoonery, as is the area of Bergamo, it having lent its dialect to the Italian buffoons.

== Chord progression ==
The basic chord progression is I–IV–V–I:

│⎸ I IV V I I IV V I :⎹⎸
I IV V I I IV V I ⎹│

== Works ==
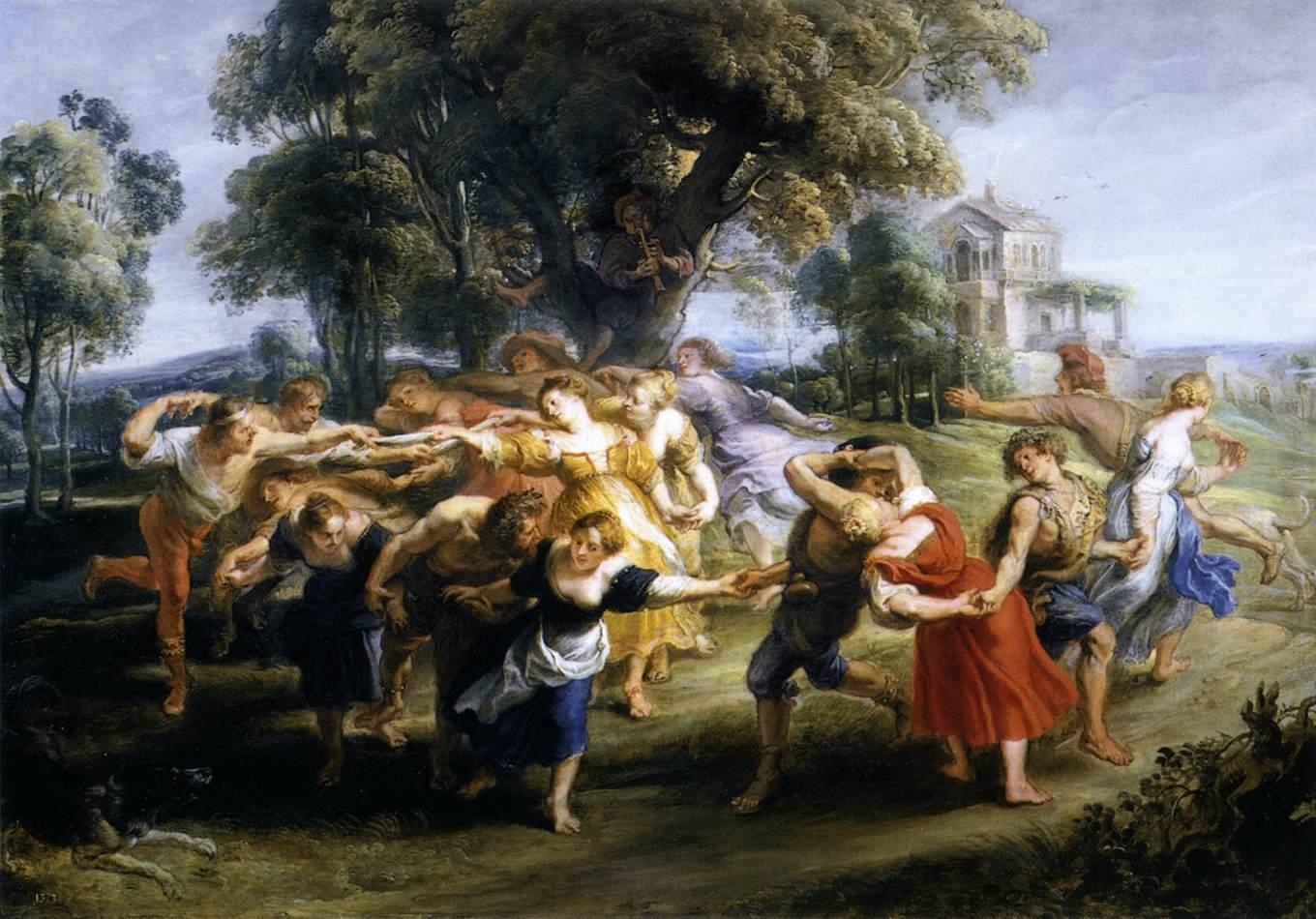
Bergamask

Seventeenth-century Italian composer Marco Uccellini adapted the Bergamasca as a lively instrumental piece titled "Aria sopra 'la bergamasca.'"

Marco Uccelini, Aria sopra la Bergamasca

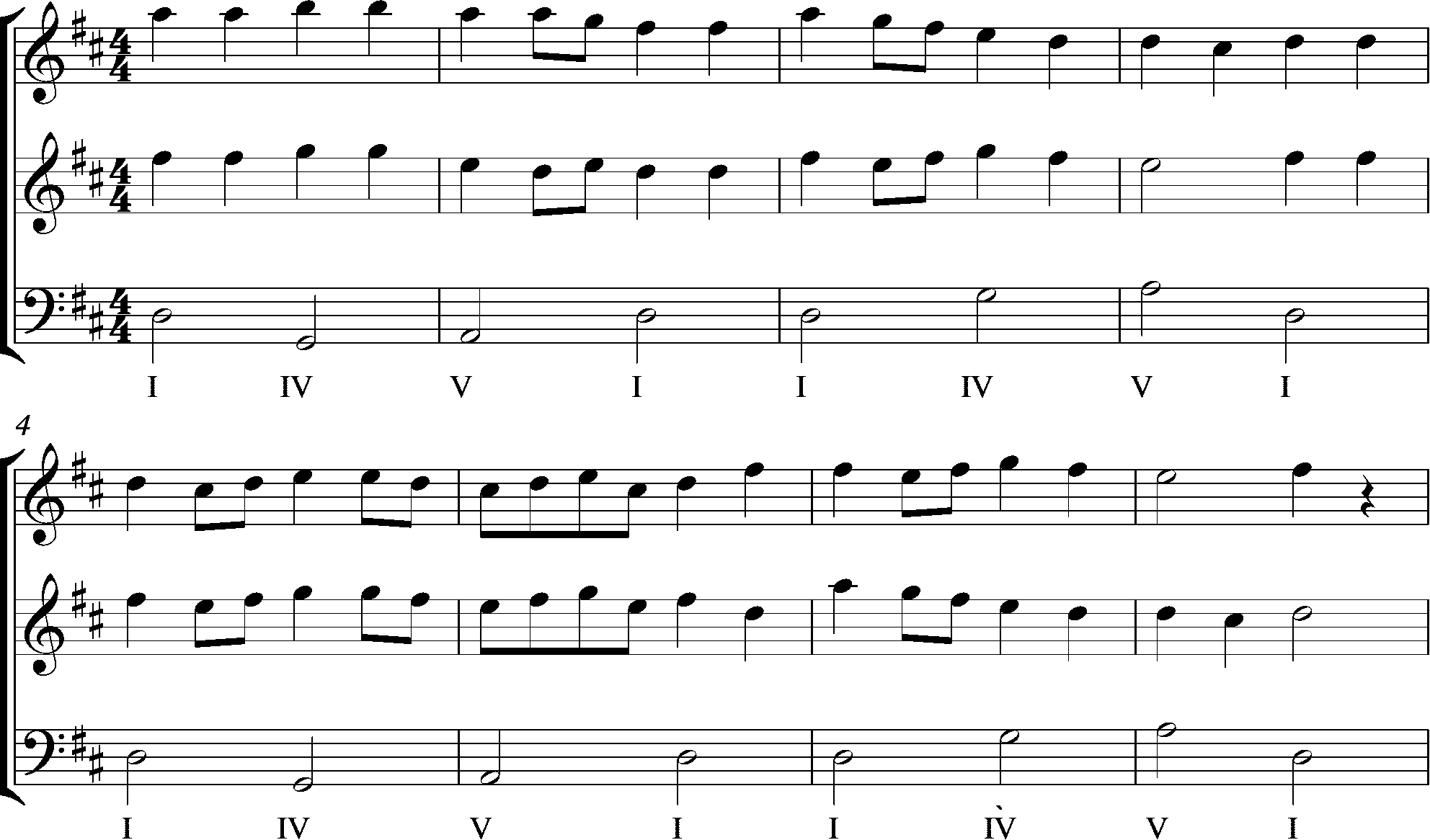
Marco Uccelini, Aria sopra la Bergamasca

Twentieth-century Italian composer Ottorino Respighi adapted the melody as the final movement of his Suite #2 of Ancient Airs and Dances.

Bergomask is the title of the second of the Two Pieces for Piano (1925) by John Ireland (1879–1972).

The title of Claude Debussy's Suite bergamasque is a poetic reference and the piece is not related musically to the Bergamask described here. Likewise, the "Masques et bergamasques" of twentieth-century French composer Gabriel Fauré is musically unrelated.

The characteristic I-IV-V-I progression features in popular music of the late 20th century, for example the song "Twist and Shout."

== See also ==
- Moresca
- Romanesca
- Masques et bergamasques
- Suite bergamasque
