= Fantasy-Sonata (John Ireland) =

Clarinet piece in E-flat major

Fantasy-Sonata is a piece in E-flat major for clarinet and piano composed by John Ireland in 1943. The work is Ireland's only extant piece for solo clarinet and one of his last major compositions before his retirement. It is dedicated to Frederick Thurston and was premiered by Thurston and Ireland in January 1944. The two also broadcast the piece live on the BBC in 1948. The piece is about 15 minutes long.

Fantasy-Sonata was written between January and June 1943, while Ireland was temporarily living in Essex. It was inspired by the Roman comic poem "Satyricon" and by Ireland's experience in being evacuated from Jersey during the Second World War. Fiona Richards has suggested that the work also contains "allusions to Ireland's attraction to younger men".

The through-composed piece is written in a very loose sonata form with frequent shifts in tempo, mood, and tonal centre, but has no clear resolution, as would be expected in a typical sonata. It has a lush and highly virtuosic piano part; Scott Goddard argued that "in all English music of the last half-century there has been no purer pianoforte writing than this". The clarinet part covers the instrument's entire range, incorporating both legato and rhythmic passages.

A reviewer from the News Chronicle, cited by Colin Lawson, noted that he "had never imagined that clarinet and piano could be combined so satisfactorily; nor that (by a mixture of tact and daring) they could form such an exciting ensemble". Stuart Craggs called the work "the high point of [Ireland's] chamber music oeuvre".
