= Green Ways (John Ireland) =

1937 set of three short atmospheric piano works composed by John Ireland

Green Ways is a set of three short atmospheric piano works composed by John Ireland in 1937, the individual titles are The Cherry Tree, Cypress and The Palm and May. They were written when the composer was 57, and are among the last pieces he wrote for piano.

Green Ways is based on quotations from A. E. Housman, William Shakespeare and Thomas Nashe.

== Pieces ==
=== The Cherry Tree ===
The Cherry Tree is prefixed with the last stanza from Loveliest of Trees, the second poem in the collection A Shropshire Lad (1896) by A. E. Housman:

And since to look at things in bloom
Fifty springs are little room,
About the woodlands I will go
To see the cherry hung with snow.

The piece appeared in the 1999-2000 Associated Board Grade 8 syllabus for the piano.

=== Cypress ===
Cypress is prefixed with the following line from Twelfth Night by William Shakespeare, sung by the Clown in Duke Orsino's palace (Act II, Scene IV):

Come away, come away, death,
And in sad cypress let me be laid.

=== The Palm and May ===
The Palm and May is prefixed with the fifth line from Spring, the Sweet Spring, a poem from Thomas Nashe's poem cycle Summer's Last Will and Testament:

The Palm and May make country houses gay.
