= Washington, West Sussex =

Village and parish in West Sussex, England

Coordinates: 50.90298°N 0.40634°W

Washington
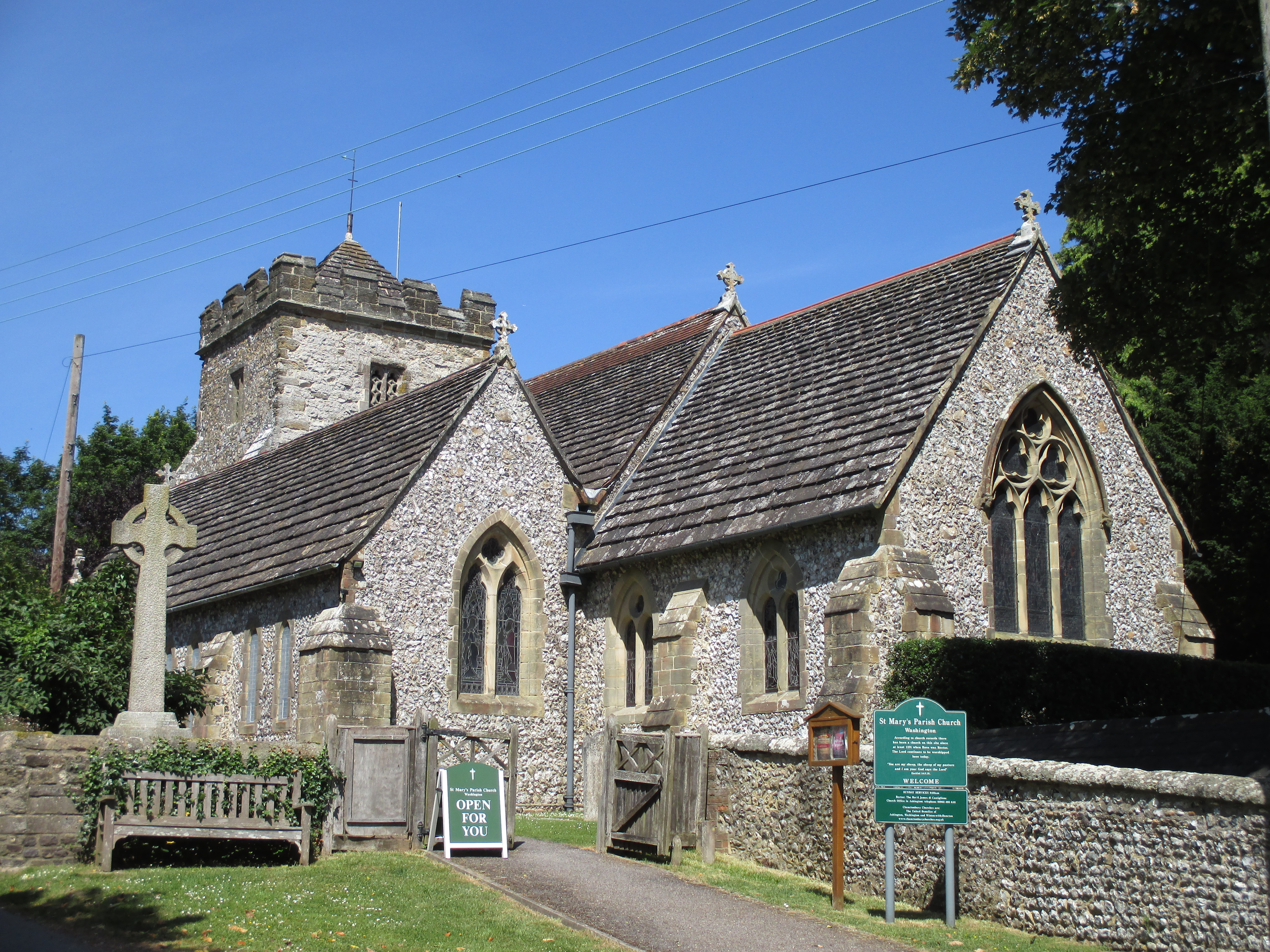
- St Mary's Church

- Location within West Sussex
- Area: 12.76 km^{2} (4.93 sq mi)
- Population: 1,930 2001 Census; 1,867 (2011 Census)
  - Density: 151/km^{2} (390/sq mi)
- OS grid reference: TQ121127
  - London: 43 miles (69 km) NNE
- Civil parish: Washington
- District: Horsham
- Shire county: West Sussex
- Region: South East
- Country: England
- Sovereign state: United Kingdom
- Post town: PULBOROUGH
- Postcode district: RH20
- Dialling code: 01903
- Police: Sussex
- Fire: West Sussex
- Ambulance: South East Coast
- UK Parliament: Arundel and South Downs
- Website: https://washingtonparish.org.uk/

Washington is a village and civil parish in the Horsham District of West Sussex, England. It is located five miles (eight kilometres) west of Steyning and three miles (five kilometres) east of Storrington on the A24 between Horsham and Worthing. The parish covers an area of 1,276 hectares (3,150 acres). In the 2001 census 1,930 people lived in 703 households, of whom 820 were economically active. At the 2011 Census the population of the civil parish was 1,867.

The village lies at the foot of the South Downs escarpment. The Anglican parish church is dedicated to St Mary. There is one pub, the Frankland Arms, a primary school and a village hall with an adjoining sports field. The hamlet named Rock lies to the north of the A283 road.

== Landmarks ==
Chanctonbury Ring, a hill fort based ring of trees atop Chanctonbury Hill on the South Downs, lies on the border of the parish and the neighbouring parish of Wiston. Chanctonbury Hill is a Site of Special Scientific Interest as an uncommon woodland type on a chalk escarpment, providing habitat for many species including the protected Great Crested Newt.

== Notable people ==
- The composer John Ireland lived in a converted windmill in Washington for the final years of his life and died there.
