= Leaves from a Child's Sketchbook =

Leaves from a Child's Sketchbook is a set of three pieces for piano solo composed in 1918 by John Ireland.

Keith Anderson says the work "offers music of great simplicity". By the Mere is an Allegretto "in a straightforward triple meter, with the dotted notes of its melody above". In the Meadow is "a graceful Moderato". The set ends with the "graphic and descriptive" The Hunt's Up, marked Con brio.

A performance of all three pieces takes about 6½ minutes. Their titles are:

1. By the Mere
2. In the Meadow
3. The Hunt's Up
