= Sarnia: An Island Sequence =

Sarnia: An Island Sequence is a set of three pieces for piano solo composed in 1940–41 by John Ireland.

A performance takes about 20 minutes. The pieces are:

1. Le Catioroc
2. In a May Morning
3. Song of the Springtides

Sarnia is an ancient Roman name for the island of Guernsey, one of the Channel Islands.

Le Catioroc is a Neolithic site in Saint Saviour, Guernsey.

A spring tide is an especially high or low tide. The name has nothing to do with the season of the year, it derives from the meaning "jump, burst forth, rise", as in a natural spring. Spring (and the opposite, neap) tides result from the relative positions of Earth, Moon and Sun. If the Sun and Moon's gravitational effects reinforce each other, there will be a spring tide; if they oppose each other, a neap.

Ireland often visited the Channel Islands. He had composed The Island Spell (the first piece of the three in his 1913 set of piano pieces Decorations) while visiting the island of Jersey in 1912. Sarnia was composed shortly before and after his evacuation from the islands, which were occupied by German forces in 1940, during World War II.
