= Rhapsody (John Ireland) =

Rhapsody is a 1915 piece for piano solo by the English composer John Ireland.

A performance takes about 8 minutes.

BBC Music Magazine (September 2010) called it "one of Ireland’s most important piano works". In the Gramophone Awards Issue 2010, Andrew Achenbach described it as a "magnificently stormy essay". According to Muso Magazine (August 2010), it "contains the sort of wacky virtuosity found in Debussy's L'isle joyeuse" (1904).
