= Songs Sacred and Profane =

Songs Sacred and Profane is a song cycle for voice and piano composed in 1929–31 by John Ireland (1879–1962). (The John Ireland Trust gives a composition date of 1943, but appears to be in error unless the composer revised the work in that year.) It consists of settings of six poems by various poets.

A typical performance takes about 14 minutes. The songs are:

1. "The Advent" (Alice Meynell (1847–1922); "Meditation", from Preludes (1875))
2. "Hymn for a Child" (Sylvia Townsend Warner (1893–1978))
3. "My Fair" (Meynell)
4. "The Salley Gardens" (W. B. Yeats (1865–1939); "An Old Song Re-Sung", from The Wanderings of Oisin and Other Poems (1889))
5. "The Soldier's Return" (Warner; from The Espalier (1925))
6. "The Scapegoat" (Warner; from The Espalier)
