= Benjamín Gutiérrez =

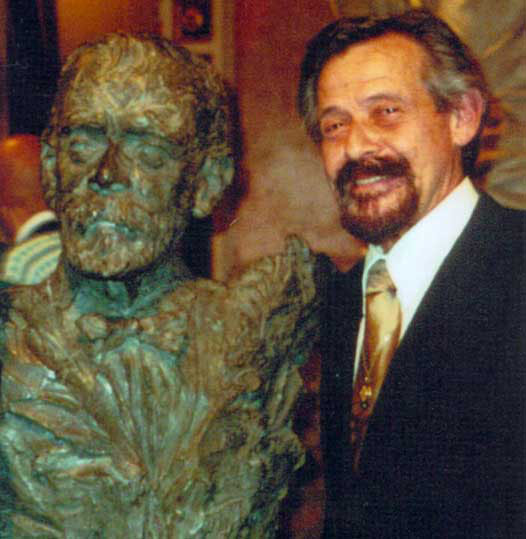

Background information
- Born: January 3, 1937 (age 88); Guadalupe, Costa Rica
- Occupations: Composer; pianist; conductor
- Website: http://www.benjamingutierrez.com/bio_ing.html

Benjamín Gutiérrez (born January 3, 1937, in Guadalupe, Costa Rica) is a celebrated composer in Costa Rica. He is a conductor, composer, and pianist. Gutiérrez began by studying music with his grandmother, Rosa Jiménez Nuñez, daughter of the composer Pilar Jiménez.” Gutiérrez then studied music in Guatemala City, Boston, Ann Arbor, Aspen, and Buenos Aires. The following were among his teachers: Ross Lee Finney, Darius Milhaud, and Alberto Ginastera. Gutiérrez has written music for piano, orchestra, violin, viola, clarinet, flute, saxophone, trombone quartet, bassoon quartet, marimba, opera, and several other instruments.

== Early years ==
Benjamín Gutiérrez was born into a musical family outside of San José; they all played instruments. Gutiérrez's father was an amateur violinist who owned a shoe factory. His mother, Lupita Sáenz Jiménez-Núñez, played the piano. Gutiérrez's grandmother recommended that he join the Conservatorio de Música in San José. Gutiérrez took piano lessons from the conservatory under the tutelage of Professor Miguel Angel Quesada until he was thirteen years old. Gutiérrez was persuaded by one of his professors to drop out of high school and enroll at Omar Dengo School which held classes at night, this allowed Gutiérrez to practice during the day. Gutiérrez studied at the conservatory with Miguel Angel Quesada for four years. After four years, his teacher suggested that he further his musical development in Guatemala.

Gutiérrez received a scholarship to attend the Concervatoria Nacional de Música de Guatemala in 1956. He studied piano and composition with Augusto Ardenois at the Conservatory. It was at the Conservatory that Gutiérrez decided to become a composer. Gutiérrez returned to Costa Rica after he received his Bachelor of Arts with an emphasis in piano.

When Gutiérrez returned to Costa Rica, he returned to being a teacher at Liceo de Heredia high school; he taught, practiced, and developed his compositional skills while at the school. When Gutiérrez was twenty years old, his opera Marianela was premiered in San José's National Theater. The opera was premiered on October 7, 1957. The work included an overture in the form of a fantasia that featured Gutiérrez at the piano with the orchestra. The orchestra who first performed the work was the National Symphony and the founder of the orchestra, Hugo Mariani, conducted it. After the overture Gutiérrez took the podium and conducted the rest of the work. The opera is based on the novel of the same name by the great Spanish writer Benito Pérez Galdós (1843-1920); the libretto was created by Gutiérrez's Guatemalan friend Roberto Paniagua. The cast included the following singers in leading roles: Albertina Moya and Luis Pacheco in the leading roles. Marianela was the first opera written and premiered by a Costa Rican composer.

Because of the success of his opera, Gutiérrez was offered a scholarship to the New England Conservatory in Boston. While Gutiérrez was in Boston, he studied with Francis Judd Cook and Carl McKinley. Gutiérrez gained a style that he refers to as "lyric dodecaphonic writing, similar to the style of Alban Berg." While at the Conservatory, Gutiérrez met Sherman Friedland, a clarinetist. Gutiérrez developed a friendship with Friedland and dedicated two compositions to him: his Sonata for Clarinet and Piano (1959) and his Concerto for Clarinet and Orchestra (1960). Both works were written while in New England and premiered by Friedland. The Sonata for Clarinet and Piano is in three movements (Moderato, Adagio, and Molto Allegro); it is primarily in a neoclassical style with clear lines, freedom in the use of tonal resources, counterpoint that is dissonant, the use of quartel/quintal intervals, and an integrity in the structure that is used by composers such as Hindemith, Milhaud, and Stravinsky. All of the movements are compact and have a very brief period of time in which the maximum intensity is reached. The last movement of the work contains some rhythms that are related to dances from the region. The concerto, which became Gutiérrez's masters thesis, was premiered in 1960 by Friedland with the Manhattan School of Music orchestra in New York City. Gutiérrez received a scholarship to attend the Aspen Music Festival in Colorado as well as the Casals Music Festival in Puerto Rico. Gutiérrez met Daris Milhaud while he was at Aspen.

Gutiérrez received a scholarship to continue studying in the United States at the University of Michigan in Ann Arbor for a master's degree in music education. While he was working on his master's degree, Gutiérrez also pursued a minor in composition. He studied with Ross Lee Finney. During this time, he also wrote the Pavana para Cuerdas (Pavane for Strings). This work was premiered in January 1968 and become one of his most popular works. The piece is in the neo-classic style. It was written in memory of a girl named Carmen María. The girl belonged to a family Gutiérrez knew.

Gutiérrez returned to Costa Rica in 1962 and began teaching at the School of Education of the University of Costa Rica. While teaching at the university, he formed a women's choir and also began working on a large-scale work that was premiered in Costa Rica. The work was an oratorio for four soloists, choir, and symphony.

== Middle years ==
Gutiérrez took a leave of absence from the School of Education of the University of Costa Rica in 1965. He obtained a fellowship from the University of Costa Rica to study with Alberto Ginastera at the Instituto Torcuato di Tella in Buenos Aires. Gutiérrez studied in Argentina for two years.

Gutiérrez's most popular concerto is his Concerto for Violin and Orchestra. This Concerto was commissioned by Hugo Mariani (who was the conductor of the National Symphony). The work was premiered in 1963 by Walter Field, the concertmaster and dedicatee.

== Works ==
=== Operas ===
- "Marianela"
- "San Josè, Nacional"
- "El Regalo de los Reyes, o las dos Evas" (1960)
- "El Pájaro del Crepúsculo"

=== Vocal ===
- "Absolutio poast Missam pro Defunctis’s Canciones"
- "Jorge Debravo"
- "Coplas a Federico"
- "Vocalise" (female chorus)

=== Orchestra ===
- Clarinet Concerto (1960)
- "Improvización", Strings 1961
- "Pavana", Strings, 1963
- Violin Concerto, 1964
- "Tramas", Strings, 1966
- "Homenaje a Juan Santamaría", 1967
- "Variaciones Concetantes", Pianoforte, Orchestra, 1969
- "Preludio Sinfónico", 1970
- "Pequeña Obertura", Band, 1974
- "Suite", 1975
- "Concierto Barroco", 1976
- "Variaciones Rítmicas", chamber orchestra, 1978
- Symphony No. 1 “En Recuerdo de Johannes Brahms”, 1980
- "Flute Concerto", 1981
- "Viola Concerto", 1983

=== Chamber and solo instruments ===
- "Trio, Flute, Clarinet, Bassoon", 1959
- "Toccata y Fuga", pianoforte, 1960
- "Música para 7 Instrumentistas", 1965
- "Sexteto", winds and pianoforte, 1968
- "Dúo", violin and pianoforte, 1971
- Pianofrote Trio, 1972
- "Toccatina", violin and violincello, 1973
- "Danza de la Pena Negra", pianoforte, 1988
- "Douze minutes á Neuchátel", strings and percussion, 1989.
