= Two Songs, 1916 =

1916 John Ireland composition

Two Songs is a pair of songs for voice and piano composed in 1916 by John Ireland (1879–1962).

A performance of both songs takes around 3 minutes. Both are settings of poems by Eric Thirkell Cooper from Soliloquies of a Subaltern Somewhere in France (1915).

1. "Blind"
2. "The Cost"
