= The Forgotten Rite =

Orchestral prelude by John Ireland

The Forgotten Rite, described as a prelude for orchestra, was composed in August – November 1913 by John Ireland (1879–1962) and published in 1918.

A performance takes about 9 minutes.

In the first decade of the twentieth century, Ireland read The House of Souls and The Hill of Dreams by Arthur Machen, known for his supernatural fantasy and horror stories. This awakened in Ireland an affinity for long-lost customs and rituals, real or imagined. The Forgotten Rite is a symphonic poem describing one such.
