= Month's mind =

Requiem Mass celebrated a month after a person's death

A month's mind (sometimes formerly termed a trental) is a requiem Mass celebrated about one month after a person's death, in memory of the deceased.

In medieval and later England, it was a service and feast held one month after the death of anyone, in their memory. Bede (died 735) writes of the day as commemorationis dies. Such "minding days" were of great antiquity, and represent survivals of the Norse minne, or ceremonial drinking to the dead.

"Minnying Days," says Blount, "from the Saxon Gemynde, days which our ancestors called their monthes mind, their Year's mind and the like, being the days whereon their souls (after their deaths) were had in special remembrance, and some office or obsequies said for them, as Obits, Dirges." The phrase is still used in Lancashire.

The month's mind is still an almost universal practice in Ireland (for Roman Catholics) for the family of the deceased and close friends to attend Mass and take a meal together.

Wills sometimes gave elaborate instructions for the conduct of commemorative services. Thus, one Thomas Windsor (who died in 1479) orders that "on my moneth's minde there be a hundred children within the age of sixteen years, to say for my soul", and candles were to be burned before the rood (cross) in the parish church and twenty priests were to be paid by his executors to sing Placebo, Dirige, and other songs. In the correspondence of Thomas, Lord Cromwell, a commemoration in 1536 is mentioned at which a hundred priests took part in the requiem Mass. Commemorative sermons were usually preached, the earliest printed example being one delivered by John Fisher, bishop of Rochester, on Margaret, countess of Richmond and Derby, in 1509.

== See also ==
- Shloshim
- Month's Mind by John Ireland
