= José Moreno Gans =

Spanish composer

José Moreno Gans (Algemesi, 1897-1976) was a Spanish composer. He was primarily a regional composer, with his works being performed in his native Valencia.

== Works ==
- Algemesienses for piano
- Tres canciones del mar
