= Two Songs, 1920 =

Music by John Ireland

Two Songs is a set of two songs for voice and piano composed in 1920 by John Ireland (1879–1962).

A performance of both songs takes about 5 minutes. The songs are:

1. "The Trellis" (words by Aldous Huxley (1894–1963)
2. "My True Love Hath My Heart" (words by Sir Philip Sidney (1554–86), from Arcadia)
