= Three Songs (Ireland, 1926) =

Poems written to music

Song
- Written: 1926
- Published: 1928
- Genre: Art song
- Composer: John Ireland

Three Songs is a set of songs for voice and piano composed in 1926 by John Ireland (1879–1962). It consists of settings of three poems by various poets.

A typical performance of the three songs as a set takes 8 minutes. The poems are:

1. "Love and Friendship" (Emily Brontë (1818–48), from Wuthering Heights and Agnes Grey)
2. "Friendship in Misfortune" (poet not identified)
3. "The One Hope" (Dante Gabriel Rossetti (1828–82), from Poems (1870))
