= Alan Rowlands =

English pianist

Alan Rowlands (1 March 1929 – 2 January 2012) was an English pianist (though born in Swansea, Wales) who made notable contributions to British musical life both as a teacher and as a performer.

He obtained a degree in chemistry at Jesus College, Oxford, before winning a scholarship to study at the Royal College of Music (RCM) under Angus Morrison.

A particular preoccupation of his was the oeuvre of John Ireland. He studied much of Ireland's piano output with the composer himself, who recommended him to undertake a recording of the complete Ireland piano music. Rowlands completed the manuscript of Ireland's Ballade of London Nights, a piano piece composed in 1930. Rowlands first performed it on 6 June 1965.

For much of his life Rowlands taught at the RCM, from which he retired in 1999.
