= Alec Rowley =

English composer (1892–1958)

Alec Rowley (13 March 1892 – 12 January 1958) was an English composer, organist, pianist, lecturer and writer on music. He composed a large number of works, mainly on a small scale and often of an educational nature though with some larger-scale orchestral and choral works. He was a dedicated teacher, broadcaster and writer; after his death the Alec Rowley Memorial Prize was established at Trinity College of Music.

== Life ==
Rowley was born in Ealing, West London on 13 March 1892. He entered the Royal Academy of Music in 1908, where he studied under Frederick Corder, H.W. Richards (organ) and Edward Morton (piano). He won several prizes, including the Mortimer and Prescott prizes for composition. He was elected a Fellow of the Royal College of Organists (FRCO) in 1914, and held a succession of church organist appointments: at St John's, Richmond, 1912–21, St Alban's, Teddington 1921–32 and, during the Second World War, at St Margaret's, Westminster. From 1920 he was a lecturer at Trinity College of Music, later a professor and Fellow of the college. He became well known as a broadcaster during the 1930s, through a series of piano duets with Edgar Moy. From 1939 to 1947 he served as a member of the Royal Philharmonic Society's management committee. He became a Fellow of the Royal Academy of Music (FRAM) in 1934.

Rowley was married twice (initially in 1930), but neither marriage lasted, and after the late 1940s he lived on his own, at 19, Ennerdale Road, Kew Gardens. His younger sister Doris Rowley was a writer who provided lyrics for his vocal works. A tennis enthusiast, Alec Rowley died during a tennis match at the Oatlands Park Hotel in Shepperton on 12 January 1958, aged sixty-five. A memorial service was held at St Sepulchre's Church, High Holborn, on 7 March 1958. After his death, Trinity College established the Alec Rowley Memorial Prize. In 1970 the Alec Rowley Pianoforte Recital Prize was established by Professor Alfred Kitchen.

== Composition ==
As a composer, Rowley produced a large body of works, many of which were educational pieces or were designed for children or amateur adult performers. Through this means, points out Robert Matthew-Walker, his music became "an integral part of the repertoires of aspiring pianists". In his compositions he generally avoided modernity, although on occasion he was not afraid to experiment with more modern harmonic forms. Like his contemporary John Ireland, his keyboard works sometimes show the influence of French music.

His orchestral and concertante works include three piano concertos, an Oboe Concerto, and a Rhapsody for viola and orchestra. He was the soloist in the first performance of his Second Piano Concerto at the wartime Proms in September 1940 with the London Symphony Orchestra under Henry Wood. His Three Idylls for piano and orchestra (1942) and Burlesque Quadrilles (1943) were also premiered at The Proms, and his English Suite and Boyhood of Christ, both for strings, were performed by the Hallé Orchestra at the Cheltenham Festival in 1949 and 1954 respectively. Rowley wrote a large number of songs and choral pieces, both sacred and secular; these include a Nativity play On Bethlehem Hill (1958).

Central to his output are around 250 solo piano pieces. These range from suites of descriptive character pieces - Flower Suite (1915), Outward Bound (1922), Seven Stencils (1926), From My Sketchbook (1932) - to more structurally formal or theory-focused works such as Seven Preludes on all the intervals (1930), Tonality Studies (1937), Polyrhythms (1939) and Five Miniature Preludes and Fugues (1946). Among his numerous educational piano works for various levels of pianistic ability is the short piece The Rambling Sailor, which was chosen as one of ten test pieces for the Daily Express national piano playing competition in 1928, and recorded as a demonstration by William Murdoch.

There are also more extended works such as the Five Nocturnes (two from 1932, three from 1947) and the two piano sonatas (1939, 1949). The Nocturne No 1 in B minor, says Robert Matthew-Walker, "requires the attention of a master pianist. It is a very fine work indeed, and its relative neglect is unconscionable". His organ works include Five Choral Preludes based on Famous Hymn Tunes (1952, Boosey & Hawkes / Edwin Ashdowne. Ltd., the Soliloquy (1946), and two organ symphonies (1954 and 1959).

Rowley wrote or contributed to a number of books, mainly of an educational nature, such as Four Hands, One Piano (1940); Practical Musicianship (1941); and Extemporisation: a Treatise for Organists (1955). He also acted as musical adviser and reader to a number of publishing houses.

== Recordings ==
Recordings are available of a few of Rowley's works:

- Music for piano (including Piano Sonatas No 1 and 2, Nocturnes No 1 and 2 and Seven Preludes on all the intervals. Dutton Epoch CDLX7401 (2022)
- Piano Concerto No. 1 in D Major for Piano, Strings and Percussion, Naxos 8557290
- Down Channel (a 'Nautical Overture'), The Golden Age of Light Music: Non-Stop to Nowhere, Guild GLCD5206
- Organ solos – Soliloquy (on Priory PRCD1083), Festival March (Priory PRCD661), Benedictus (Delphian DCD34064)
- Nocturne No. 5 in F for piano (Quartz QTZ2128)
- Music for viola and piano: Reverie, Aubade, Farandole Guild 7275
- Shepherd's Delight, for strings (1929) (MPR CWSO01)
- The Rambling Sailor (1928), William Murdoch, piano APR 6029
- A Flower Suite, op 10 (1915), Jeffrey Wagner, piano
- Three Quiet Preludes for organ (1937), Robert James Stove, Ars Organi AOR004 (2022)
