= Three Songs to Poems by Thomas Hardy =

Music based on Thomas Hardy's poetry

Three Songs to Poems by Thomas Hardy is a set of songs for voice and piano composed in 1925 by John Ireland (1879–1962). It consists of settings of three poems by Thomas Hardy (1840–1928).

A performance of all three songs takes around 7 minutes. The songs are:

1. "Summer Schemes" (from Late Lyrics and Earlier with Many Other Verses (1922))
2. "Her Song" (from Late Lyrics and Earlier with Many Other Verses)
3. "Weathers"
