= Efraín Amaya =

Venezuelan-born American composer

- Born: 1959 (age 66–67); Caracas, Venezuela
- Education: Indiana University, Rice University
- Occupations: Composer, conductor, pianist, educator
- Organizations: Carnegie Mellon University, Greensburg America Opera, The Point Chamber Orchestra
- Known for: Classical composition, orchestral conducting
- Spouse: Susana Amundaraín

Efraín Amaya (born 1959 Caracas, Venezuela) is a Venezuelan-born American composer.

== Biography ==
Amaya studied piano and composition at Indiana University until 1985 and orchestral conducting at the Shepherd School of Music at Rice University until 1988. He was a piano student of Shigeo Neriki, Zadel Skolovsky and Harriet Serr, a composition student of John Eaton, Juan Orrego-Salas, Frederick Fox, Ellsworth Milburn, Daniel Börtz and Ib Nørholm, and learned orchestral conducting from Samuel Jones, Uri Mayer and Benjamin Zander.

During his studies, he directed the Campanile Orchestra at Rice University from 1985 to 1988. After his return to Venezuela, he was music director of the youth symphony orchestra Núcleo La Rinconada from 1989 to 1992 and conducted various other Venezuelan orchestras. From 1996 to 2002 he was music director and conductor of the Westmoreland Youth Symphony Orchestra and from 2000 to 2006 of the Three Rivers Young Peoples Orchestra, and he also worked as a guest conductor with other orchestras.

He teaches on the School Music faculty at Carnegie Mellon University, is music director and conductor of the Greensburg America Opera, and of The Point Chamber Orchestra, which he founded. Amaya is married to painter and performance artist Susana Amundaraín.

== Recordings ==
- A Sense of Time
- Clepsydra
- "Syzygy" Music for flute
- From "Dreaming in Color"
- "Pres-ent" for flute and cello
