= Three Songs to Poems by Arthur Symons =

Song by John Ireland

Three Songs is a set of songs for high voice and piano composed in 1918–19 by John Ireland (1879–1962). It consists of settings of three poems by Arthur Symons (1865–1945).

A typical performance of the songs as a set takes seven minutes. The poems are:

1. "The Adoration"
2. "The Rat"
3. "Rest"
