= Two Songs, 1928 =

Song by John Ireland

Two Songs is a pair of songs for voice and piano composed in 1928 by John Ireland (1879–1962).

A performance of both songs takes around 7 minutes. The songs are:

1. "Tryst" (words by Arthur Symons (1865–1945), from Silhouettes (1892))
2. "During Music" (words by Dante Gabriel Rossetti (1828–82), from The Collected Works of Dante Gabriel Rossetti, Vol. 1 (1886))
