= London Pieces =

London Pieces is a set of three pieces for piano solo composed in 1917–20 by John Ireland.

A performance of all three pieces takes about 11½ minutes. Their titles are:

1. Chelsea Reach (6 minutes). Chelsea is an affluent area in central London, bounded to the south by the River Thames. A reach is (among other things) a stretch of water. Chelsea Reach is the portion of the River Thames between Battersea Bridge and Chelsea Bridge, very close to where Ireland lived. The piece, using the form and rhythms of the barcarolle, evokes the flow of the river. Composed in 1917.
2. Ragamuffin. A ragamuffin is a typical London character type. This piece is a scherzo, composed in 1917 and inspired by a real-life encounter with a street urchin.
3. Soho Forenoons. Soho is an area of the City of Westminster, and part of London's West End. The forenoon is the morning. This piece, composed in 1920, is marked ‘quasi Tambourine’, a reference to the old French dance, an allusion to the cosmopolitan flavour of the Soho district.
