= A Downland Suite =

1932 composition by John Ireland

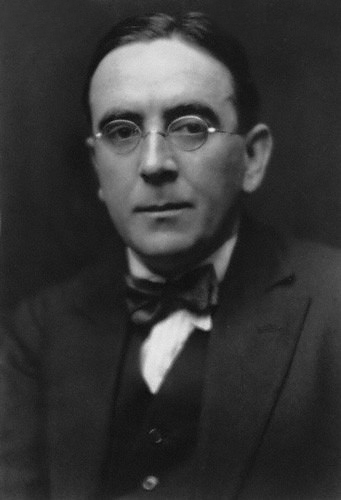
John Ireland, c. 1920

A Downland Suite is a 1932 composition for brass band in four movements by John Ireland. It has also been arranged for string orchestra and various other instruments.

The English composer John Ireland wrote the work in 1932 for the National Brass Band Championship of Great Britain at a time when original pieces were regularly commissioned for major contests. It has the dedication "to my friend Kenneth Wright". The winning band on this occasion was the Fodens Motor Works Band, conducted by Fred Mortimer at The Crystal Palace.

== Movements ==
There are four movements:

1. Prelude: Allegro energico
2. Elegy: Lento espressivo
3. Minuet: Allegretto grazioso
4. Rondo: Poco allegro

== Analysis ==
The suite is a pictorial depiction enshrining the composer's love for the Sussex downs and has been described by Donald McLeod as "sunnily bucolic". In keeping with its intention as a contest piece, the suite is both technical and expressive, and is complicated and difficult to read. This leads to the bandmaster having great control over the arrangement.

The first movement, the Prelude, contains contrasting solo and tutti passages. The rhythms of the Prelude also contrast the following more tender, harmonious second movement, the Elegy. The Elegy and Minuet are among Ireland’s most popular compositions. The Elegy has an Elgarian flavour from its melodic structure whereas the Minuet is charming, having something of a bucolic feel. Its Minuet is flowing and elegant. The Rondo is attractive and bright. A performance of the suite usually lasts about eighteen minutes.

The first three movements were arranged for string orchestra a number of years later by one of Ireland's students, Geoffrey Bush, who also transcribed Ireland's Elegiac Meditation. The suite was also transcribed for wind band in 1997 by Ray Steadman-Allen. Today the suite is still widely performed and recorded its original brass-band form, and in its arranged form by ensembles such as the London Philharmonic Orchestra and the City of London Sinfonia.
