= Two Pieces for Piano (1929–30, John Ireland) =

Two Pieces for Piano is a work for piano solo composed in 1929–30 by John Ireland.

A performance of both pieces takes about 8 minutes. They are:

1. February's Child
2. Aubade

An aubade is a morning love song (as opposed to a serenade, which is in the evening), or a song or poem about lovers separating at dawn.
