= My Song Is Love Unknown =

Christian hymn

- Hymn
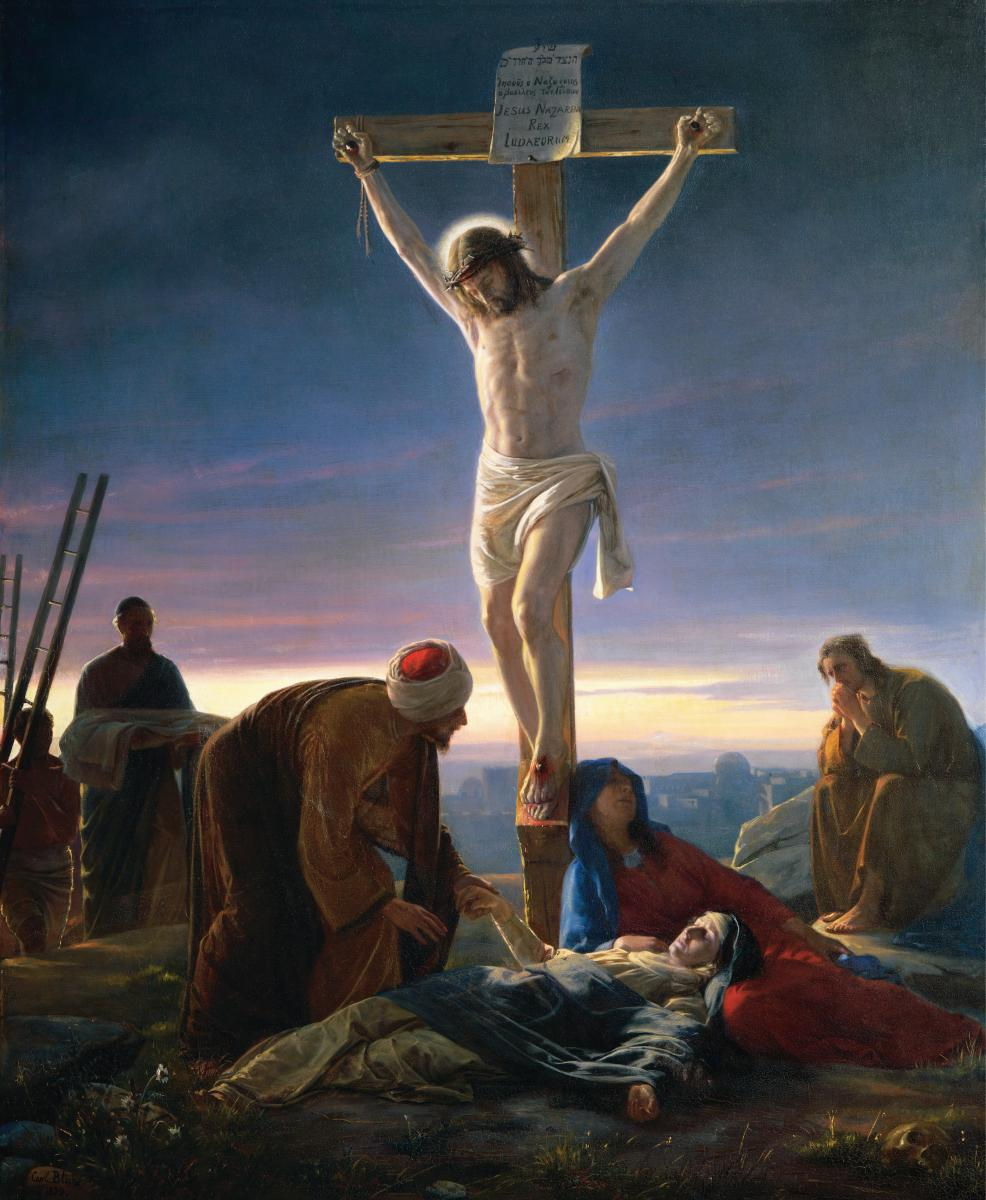
- The crucifixion of Jesus
- Genre: Hymn
- Written: 1664
- Text: Samuel Crossman
- Meter: 6.6.6.6.4.4.4.4
- Melody: "Love Unknown" by John Ireland

"My Song Is Love Unknown" is a hymn by Samuel Crossman, written in 1664. It is predominantly used as a hymn for Good Friday.

The hymn tune to which it is usually sung is called Love Unknown, which is by John Ireland (1879–1962). Ireland composed the melody over lunch one day at the suggestion of organist and fellow-composer Geoffrey Shaw.

== History ==
Samuel Crossman was a Puritan minister who had taken part in the Savoy Conference but was ejected from the Church of England due to his opposition to the Act of Uniformity 1662. During his exile from the Church of England, he wrote "My Song Is Love Unknown" as a poem in 1664. It was first published in The Young Man’s Meditation and then became published as an Anglican hymn in 1684, after Crossman had rejoined the Church of England in 1665 and two years after his death. The last verse of the hymn was written as an imitation of George Herbert's The Temple poem as a tribute by Crossman to Herbert. In the 21st century, the language of the hymn is sometimes updated by hymnal editors, a move which is often lamented by traditional hymnologists who feel that the newer language loses the original meaning and nuance.

The most commonly used tune for "My Song Is Love Unknown" is called "Love Unknown". It was written by John Ireland in 1925 and reportedly was composed in 15 minutes on the back of a menu. Ireland's tune was credited with bringing the hymn out of obscurity which it had fallen into during Victorian times.

== Analysis ==
The Reverend Percy Dearmer stated that "My Song Is Love Unknown" "... illustrates the fact that 17th-century Britain was free from the unwholesome treatment of the Passion which is shown, for instance, in the Spanish sculpture of that age". The fourth verse asked what Jesus had done to deserve the crucifixion with the ironic answer being that he had healed the sick.

== Lyrics ==
My song is love unknown,
my Saviour’s love to me;
love to the loveless shown,
that they might lovely be.
O who am I,
that for my sake
my Lord should take
frail flesh and die?

He came from His blest throne
salvation to bestow;
but men made strange, and none
the longed-for Christ would know.
But O, my Friend,
my Friend indeed,
who at my need
His life did spend!

Sometimes they strew His way,
and His sweet praises sing;
resounding all the day
hosannas to their King.
Then 'Crucify!'
is all their breath,
and for His death
they thirst and cry.

Why, what hath my Lord done?
What makes this rage and spite?
He made the lame to run,
He gave the blind their sight.
Sweet injuries!
yet they at these
themselves displease,
and 'gainst Him rise.

They rise, and needs will have
my dear Lord made away;
a murderer they save,
the Prince of Life they slay.
Yet cheerful He
to suffering goes,
that He His foes
from thence might free.

In life no house, no home
my Lord on earth might have;
in death no friendly tomb
but what a stranger gave.
What may I say?
Heav'n was His home;
but mine the tomb
wherein He lay.

Here might I stay and sing:
no story so divine;
never was love, dear King,
never was grief like Thine!
This is my Friend,
in Whose sweet praise
I all my days
could gladly spend.

— Samuel Crossman, Common Praise 112

== Inspirations ==
The British band Coldplay's song "A Message" on their 2005 album X&Y, is lyrically and musically derived from the hymn.
