= Two Pieces for Piano (1925, John Ireland) =

Two Pieces for Piano is a set of two pieces for piano solo composed in 1925 by John Ireland.

A performance of both pieces takes about 8 minutes. They are:

1. April (5 minutes)
2. Bergomask

A bergomask is a dance and associated melody and chord progression associated with the town of Bergamo in Northern Italy.
