= Two Songs, 1917–18 =

Songs by John Ireland

Two Songs is a pair of songs for voice and piano composed in 1917–18 by John Ireland (1879–1962). Both are settings of poems by Rupert Brooke (1887–1915) from his collection 1914.

A performance of both songs takes around 6 minutes. The songs are:

1. "The Soldier"
2. "Blow Out, You Bugles"
