= Decorations (John Ireland) =

Decorations is a set of three pieces for piano solo composed in 1912–13 by John Ireland.

A performance of all three pieces takes about 9½ minutes. Their titles are:

1. The Island Spell
2. Moonglade
3. The Scarlet Ceremonies

The set was reviewed by the Monthly Musical Record in August 1915, as follows:

"These three pieces are well named, since they are the most successful pieces of pictorial writing we have encountered since the advent of Maurice Ravel, whose style they somewhat resemble as regards technique. Magic seas and fairy woods are evoked by the subtlest art in the first piece, “The Island Spell”. Is it by accident that one conjures up the magic music of Shakespeare's Tempest? An all-pervading mood is here, as with the best types of decorative music. There is a curious compelling charm and feeling of remoteness about the “Moon-Glade”, also written over a poem of Arthur Symons commencing “Why are you so sorrowful in dreams?” This piece is pure impressionism. The fading tonality at the close, so like the stuff dreams are made of, is a wonderful piece of tone-artistry. The third movement entitled “The Scarlet Ceremonies” is the most striking of the set. It is founded on a quotation from Arthur Machen’s “The White People”. Against a continuously palpitating pattern in the right hand a trumpet-like theme is given out by the left. The whole movement is evolved from the first twelve bars or so. The theme passes to the right hand later on, appearing over a fluttering figure of fourths in the bass. There is an original “pedal-point” effect at the end, and a new double glissando of white and black notes which will be responsible for many grazed fingers. Originality breathes in every bar of the Decorations, and the composer evidently possesses peculiar magic powers in the world of sound."
