= John Ireland (composer) =

British composer and music teacher (1879–1962)

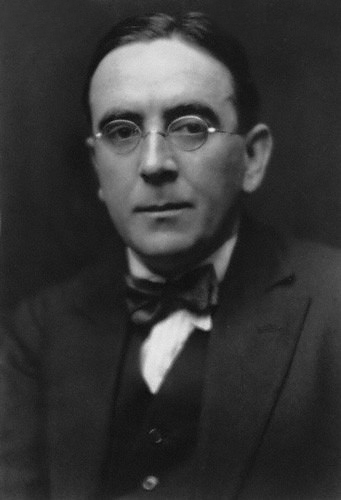
- Ireland, c. 1920
- Born: 13 August 1879; Bowdon, Cheshire, England
- Died: 12 June 1962 (aged 82); Rock Mill, Washington, Sussex, England
- Education: Royal College of Music
- Occupations: Composer, teacher
- Spouse: Dorothy Phillips (m. 1926; div. 1928)

John Nicholson Ireland (13 August 1879 – 12 June 1962) was an English composer and teacher of music. The majority of his output consists of piano miniatures and of songs with piano. His best-known works include the short instrumental or orchestral work "The Holy Boy", a setting of the poem "Sea-Fever" by John Masefield, a formerly much-played Piano Concerto, the hymn tune Love Unknown and the choral motet "Greater Love Hath No Man".

== Life ==
John Nicholson Ireland was born on 13 August 1879 in Bowdon, near Altrincham, Cheshire, into a family of English and Scottish descent and some cultural distinction. His father, Alexander Ireland, a publisher and newspaper proprietor, was aged 69 at John's birth. John was the youngest of the five children from Alexander's second marriage (his first wife had died). His mother, Annie Elizabeth Nicholson Ireland, was a biographer and 30 years younger than Alexander. She died in October 1893, when John was 14, and Alexander died the following year, when John was 15.

Ireland entered the Royal College of Music in 1893, studying piano with Frederic Cliffe, and organ, his second study, under Walter Parratt. From 1897 he studied composition under Charles Villiers Stanford. In 1896 Ireland was appointed sub-organist at Holy Trinity, Sloane Street, London SW1, and later, from 1904 until 1926, was organist and choirmaster at St Luke's Church, Chelsea.

Ireland began to make his name in the early 1900s as a composer of songs and chamber music. His Violin Sonata No. 1 of 1909 won first prize in the Cobbett Competition. Even more successful was his Violin Sonata No. 2: completed in January 1917, he submitted this to a competition organised to assist musicians in wartime. The jury included the violinist Albert Sammons and the pianist William Murdoch, who together gave the work its first performance at Aeolian Hall in New Bond Street on 6 March that year. As Ireland recalled, "It was probably the first and only occasion when a British composer was lifted from relative obscurity in a single night by a work cast in a chamber-music medium." The work was enthusiastically reviewed, and the publisher Winthrop Rogers offered immediate publication (the first edition was sold out even before it had been processed by the printers). A subsequent performance of the Violin Sonata by Ireland and the violinist Désiré Defauw drew a packed audience to the Wigmore Hall in London.

Ireland frequently visited the Channel Islands and was inspired by the landscape and the ambience. In 1912 he composed the piano piece The Island Spell (the first of the three pieces in his set Decorations) while staying in Jersey, and his set of three pieces for piano Sarnia: An Island Sequence was written while living in Guernsey in 1939 to 1940. He returned from Guernsey to Britain in 1940 just before the German invasion of the Channel Islands during World War II.

From 1923 he taught at the Royal College of Music. His pupils there included Richard Arnell, Ernest John Moeran, Benjamin Britten (who later described Ireland as possessing "a strong personality but a weak character"), the composer Alan Bush, Geoffrey Bush (no relation to Alan), who subsequently edited or arranged many of Ireland's works for publication, Anthony Bernard and Percy Turnbull (who became a lifelong friend).

Ireland was a lifelong bachelor, except for a brief interlude when, in quick succession, he married, separated, and divorced. On 17 December 1926, aged 47, he married a 17-year old pupil, Dorothy Phillips. This marriage was dissolved on 18 September 1928, and it is believed not to have been consummated. He took a similar interest in another young student, Helen Perkin, a pianist and composer, to whom he dedicated both the Piano Concerto in E♭ major and the Legend for piano and orchestra (which began life as a second concerto). She gave the premiere performance of both works, but any thoughts he had for a deeper relationship with her came to nothing when she married George Mountford Adie, a disciple of George Gurdjieff, and she later moved with Adie to Australia. Subsequently, Ireland withdrew the dedications. In 1947 Ireland acquired a personal assistant and companion, a woman named Norah Kirkby, who remained with him until his death. Despite these associations with women, it is clear from his private papers that he was a closeted homosexual; several commentators support this view.

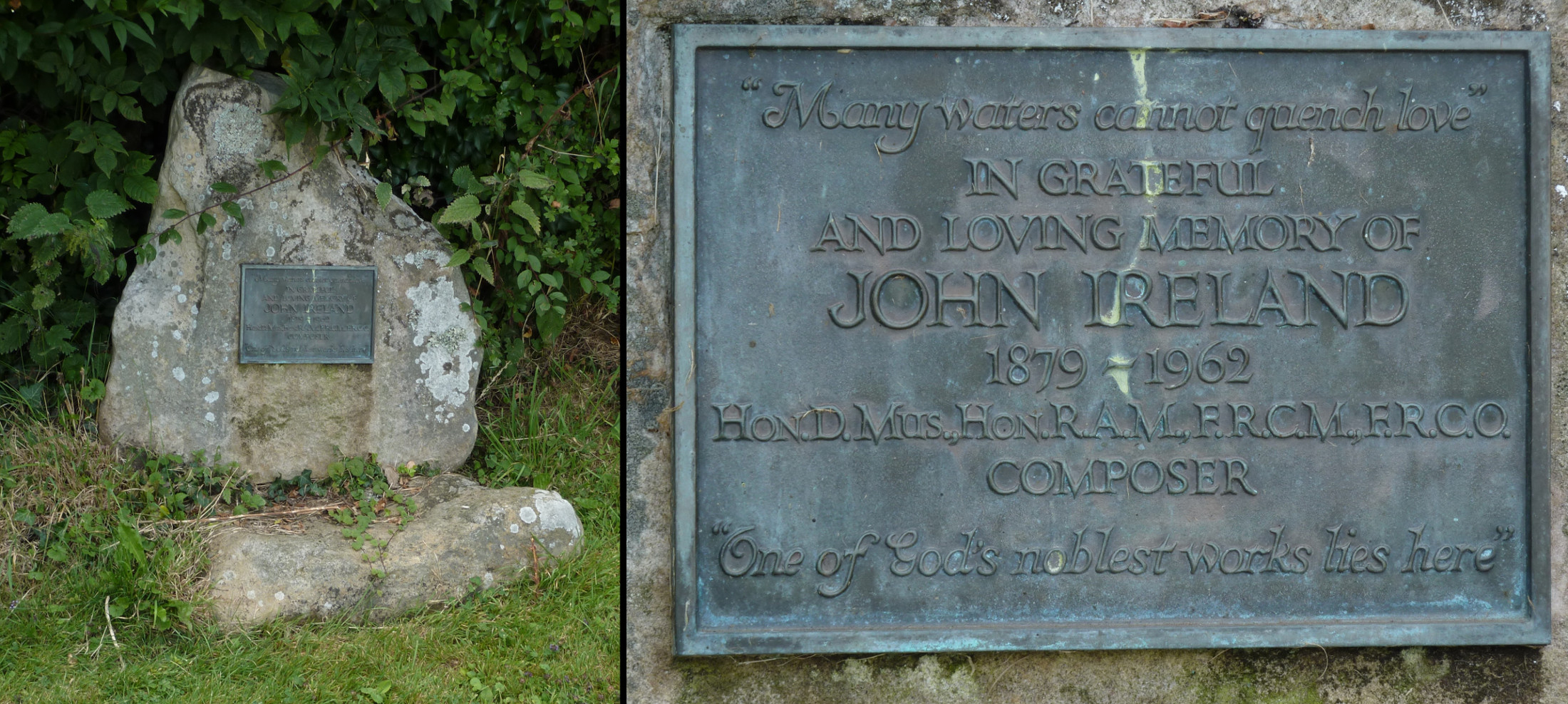
John Ireland's grave in the churchyard of St. Mary the Virgin in Shipley, West Sussex, 2014

On 10 September 1949, his 70th birthday was celebrated in a special Prom concert, at which his Piano Concerto was played by Eileen Joyce, who was also the first pianist to record the concerto, in 1942.

Ireland retired in 1953, settling in the hamlet of Rock in Sussex, where he lived in a converted windmill, Rock Mill, Washington, for the rest of his life. It was there he met the young pianist Alan Rowlands, who would be Ireland's choice to record his complete piano music.

Ireland died of heart failure on 12 June 1962 at Rock Mill. He was 82. He is buried at St Mary's Church in Shipley, near his home. His epitaph reads "Many waters cannot quench love" and "One of God's noblest works lies here."

== Music ==
From Charles Villiers Stanford, Ireland inherited a thorough knowledge of the music of Ludwig van Beethoven, Johannes Brahms and other German classical composers, but as a young man he was also strongly influenced by Claude Debussy and Maurice Ravel as well as by the earlier works of Igor Stravinsky and Béla Bartók. From these influences, he developed his own brand of "English Impressionism", related more closely to French and Russian models than to the folk-song style then prevailing in English music.

Like most other Impressionist composers, Ireland favoured small forms and wrote neither symphonies nor operas, although his Piano Concerto is considered among the best composed by an Englishman. His output includes some chamber music and a substantial body of piano works, including his best-known piece The Holy Boy, known in numerous arrangements. He wrote songs to poems by A. E. Housman, Thomas Hardy, Christina Rossetti, John Masefield, Rupert Brooke and others. Due to his job at St Luke's Church, he also wrote hymns, carols, and other sacred choral music; among choirs he is probably best known for the anthem Greater love hath no man, often sung in services that commemorate the victims of war. The hymn tune Love Unknown is sung in churches throughout the English-speaking world, as is his Communion Service in C major.

His works have been recorded and performed by the choir of Westminster Abbey, the choir of Wells Cathedral and many others.

He appears as pianist in a recording of his Fantasy-Sonata for Clarinet and Piano with Frederick Thurston, his Cello Sonata (1923) with cellist Antoni Sala (Note: Recorded by Columbia in 1928) and his Violin Sonata No. 1 (1909) with Frederick Grinke, who performed and recorded several of his chamber works. His Piano Sonatina (1926–27) and a number from his cycle Songs Sacred and Profane (1929) were dedicated to his friend the conductor and BBC music producer Edward Clark.

Ireland wrote his only film score for the 1946 Australian film The Overlanders, from which an orchestral suite was extracted posthumously by Charles Mackerras. Some of his pieces, such as the popular A Downland Suite and Themes from Julius Caesar, were completed or re-transcribed after his death by his student Geoffrey Bush.

== Works ==
=== Chamber works ===
A to R

- Bagatelle for violin and piano (1911)
- Berceuse for violin and piano (1902)
- Fantasy-Sonata in E♭ major for clarinet and piano (1943)
- Cavatina for violin and piano (1904)
- The Holy Boy: A Carol of the Nativity for cello and piano (arr. 1919)
- The Holy Boy: A Carol of the Nativity for violin and piano (arr. 1919)
- The Holy Boy: A Carol of the Nativity for string quartet (arr. 1941)
- Phantasie, Trio No. 1 in A minor for violin, cello and piano (1906)

S to Z

- Sextet for clarinet, horn and string quartet (1898)
- Sonata in G minor for cello and piano (1923)
- Sonata No. 1 in D minor for violin and piano
- Sonata No. 2 in A minor for violin and piano (1915–1917)
- String Quartet No. 1 in D minor (1897)
- String Quartet No. 2 in C minor (1897)
- Trio No. 2 in One Movement for violin, cello and piano (1917)
- Trio No. 3 in E for violin, cello and piano (1938)
- Trio in D minor for clarinet, cello and piano (1912–1914)

=== Church music ===
A to G

- Adam Lay Ybounden in F minor
- Benedictus in F
- Communion Service in A♭ (Treble voices and organ)
- Communion service in C
- Evening Service in A (SATB and organ)
- Evening Service in C (SATB and organ)
- Evening Service in F
- Ex Ore Innocentium (treble voices and organ or piano)
- Greater Love Hath No Man (motet)

H to Z

- The Hills (chorus a capella)
- Jubilate Deo in F major
- Magnificat and Nunc Dimittis in C major
- Magnificat and Nunc Dimittis in F major
- "My Song Is Love Unknown" (hymn)
- Te Deum in F major
- Vexilla Regis (anthem)

=== Film score ===
- The Overlanders (1946)

=== Orchestra ===
A to L

- Comedy Overture (1934)
- Concertino Pastorale (string orchestra) (1939)
- A Downland Suite (1932)
- Epic March (1942)
- The Forgotten Rite (1913, published 1918)
- The Holy Boy (string orchestra, arr. 1941)
- London Overture (1936)

M to Z

- Mai-Dun, A Symphonic Rhapsody (1921)
- Meditation on John Keble's Rogation Hymn (1958)
- Orchestral Poem
- Poem
- Satyricon – Overture (1946)
- Symphonic Studies
- Tritons (1899)
- Two Symphonic Studies

=== Organ ===
A to G

- Alla marcia
- Capriccio
- Cavatina (arr. of Cavatina for violin and piano, 1904)
- Elegiac Romance
- Elegy (from A Downland Suite – arr. Alec Rowley)
- Epic March (arr. Robert Gower)

H to Z

- The Holy Boy (1913, arr. 1919 by Alec Rowley)
- Marcia Popolare
- Meditation on John Keble's Rogation Hymn
- Miniature Suite
- Sursum Corda

=== Piano ===
A to L

- The Almond Tree (1913)
- Ballad (1929)
- Ballade of London Nights (1930)
- Columbine (1949)
- The Darkened Valley (1920)
- Decorations (1912–13)
1. The Island Spell
2. Moonglade
3. The Scarlet Ceremonies
- Equinox (1922)
- First Rhapsody (1906)
- Green Ways – Three Lyric Pieces (1937)
1. The Cherry Tree
2. Cypress
3. The Palm and May
- In Those Days (1895)
1. Daydream
2. Meridian
- Indian Summer (1932)
- Leaves from a Child's Sketchbook (1918)
1. By the Mere
2. In the Meadow
3. The Hunt's Up
- London Pieces (1917–20)
1. Chelsea Reach
2. Ragamuffin
3. Soho Forenoons

M to S

- Mai-Dun, A Symphonic Rhapsody, arranged for piano four hands (1931)
- Merry Andrew (1919)
- Month's Mind (1935)
- On a Birthday Morning (1922)
- Prelude in E♭ major (1924)
- Preludes for Piano (1913–15)
1. The Undertone
2. Obsession
3. The Holy Boy
4. Fire of Spring
- Rhapsody (1915)
- Sarnia: An Island Sequence (1940–41)
1. Le Catioroc
2. In a May Morning
3. Song of the Springtides
- A Sea Idyll (1960)
- Soliloquy (1922)
- Sonata in E minor (1920; premiered by Frederic Lamond on 12 June 1920, the only time he ever played it)
- Sonatina (1926–27)
- Spring Will Not Wait (1928)
- Summer Evening (1920)

T to Z

- The Towing Path (1918)
- Two Pieces for Piano (1921)
1. For Remembrance
2. Amberley Wild Brooks
- Two Pieces for Piano (1925)
1. April
2. Bergomask
- Two Pieces for Piano (1929–30)
1. February's Child
2. Aubade
- Three Dances (1913)
1. Gypsy Dance
2. Country Dance
3. Reaper's Dance
- Three Pastels (1941)
1. A Grecian Lad
2. The Boy Bishop
3. Puck's Birthday

=== Piano and orchestra ===
- Legend (1933)
- Piano Concerto in E♭ major (1930)

=== Songs ===
A to S

- "Alpine Song" (James Vila Blake, 1911)
- "Aubade" (soprano, alto and piano, 1912)
- "Bed in Summer"
- "The Bells of San Marie" (John Masefield, 1918)
- "Earth's Call (A Sylvan Rhapsody)" (1918)
- Five Poems by Thomas Hardy (song cycle, Thomas Hardy, 1926)
1. "Beckon to me to come"
2. "In my sage moments"
3. "It was what you bore with you, woman"
4. "The tragedy of that moment
5. "Dear, think not that they will forget you"
- Five Sixteenth Century Poems (song cycle, various poets, 1938)
1. "A Thanksgiving" (William Cornysh)
2. "All in a Garden Green" (Thomas Howell)
3. "An Aside" (Anon.)
4. "A Report Song" (Nicholas Breton)
5. "The Sweet Season" (Richard Edwardes)
- "Full Fathom Five" (William Shakespeare)
- "A Garrison Churchyard" (Eric Thirkell Cooper, 1916)
- "Hawthorn Time" (1919)
- "The Heart's Desire" (1917)
- "Hope the Hornblower" (1912)
- "I Have Twelve Oxen" (1919)
- "If There Were Dreams to Sell" (1918)
- "If We Must Part" (1929)
- "The Journey" (1920)
- The Land of Lost Content (song cycle, A. E. Housman, 1920–21)
1. "The Lent Lily"
2. "Ladslove" ("Look not in my eyes")
3. "Goal and Wicket" ("Twice a week the winter thorough")
4. "The Vain Desire" ("If truth in hearts that perish")
5. "The Encounter" ("The street sounds to the soldiers' tread")
6. "Epilogue" ("You smile upon your friend today")
- "Love is a Sickness Full of Woes"
- Mother and Child (song cycle, Christina Rossetti, 1918)
1. "Newborn"
2. "The Only child"
3. "Hope"
4. "Skylark and Nightingale"
5. "The Blind Boy"
6. "Baby"
7. "Death Parting"
8. "The Garland"
- "The Sacred Flame"
- "Santa Chiara" (1925)
- "Sea-Fever" (John Masefield, 1913)
- "Song from o'er the Hill" (1913)
- Songs of a Wayfarer (song cycle, various poets, 1912)
1. "Memory" (William Blake, "Memory, hither come")
2. "When Daffodils Begin to Peer" (William Shakespeare)
3. "English May" (Dante Gabriel Rossetti)
4. "I Was Not Sorrowful" (Ernest Dowson, "Spleen")
5. "I Will Walk on the Earth" (James Vila Blake)
- Songs Sacred and Profane (song cycle, various poets, 1929–31)
1. "The Advent" (Alice Meynell)
2. "Hymn for a Child" (Sylvia Townsend Warner)
3. "My Fair" (Meynell)
4. "The Salley Gardens" (W. B. Yeats)
5. "The Soldier's Return" (Warner)
6. "The Scapegoat" (Warner)
- "Spring sorrow" (1918)
- Spring Will Not Wait

T to Z

- Three Songs (Arthur Symons, 1918–19)
1. "The Adoration"
2. "The Rat"
3. "Rest"
- Three Songs (various poets, 1926)
1. "Love and Friendship" (Emily Brontë)
2. "Friendship in Misfortune" (poet not identified)
3. "The One Hope" (Dante Gabriel Rossetti)
- Three Songs to Poems by Thomas Hardy (1925)
1. "Summer Schemes"
2. "Her Song"
3. "Weathers"
- "The Three Ravens" (1920)
- "There is a Garden in Her Face" (two voices and piano)
- "Three Variations on 'Cadet Rousselle'" (1919)
- Two Songs (Eric Thirkell Cooper, 1916)
1. "Blind"
2. "The Cost"
- Two Songs (Rupert Brooke, 1917–18)
1. "The Soldier"
2. "Blow Out, You Bugles"
- Two Songs (various poets, 1920)
1. "The Trellis" (Aldous Huxley)
2. "My True Love Hath My Heart" (Sir Philip Sidney)
- Two Songs (various poets, 1928)
1. "Tryst" (Arthur Symons)
2. "During Music (Dante Gabriel Rossetti)
- "The Vagabond" (John Masefield, 1922)
- We'll to the Woods No More (song cycle, A. E. Housman, 1928)
1. "We'll to the Woods No More"
2. "In Boyhood" ("When I would muse in boyhood")
3. "Spring Will Not Wait" ("'Tis time, I think, by Wenlock town")
- "What Are You Thinking Of?" (1924)
- "When I Am Dead, My Dearest" (1924)

=== Chorus and orchestra ===
- These Things Shall Be (1937)

=== Other (unclassified) ===
- Brooks Equinox
- Elegiac Meditation
- Scherzo & Cortege (1942)

== Bibliography ==
- Foreman, Lewis (ed). The John Ireland Companion. Woodbridge: The Boydell Press, 2011. ISBN 978-1-84383-686-5
- Longmire, John. John Ireland: Portrait of a Friend. Baker, 1969.
- Richards, Fiona. The Music of John Ireland. Ashgate, 2000 (reissued Routledge, 2018).
- Scott-Sutherland, Colin. John Ireland. Rickmansworth: Triad Press, 1980. ISBN 978-0-90207-025-7
- Muriel V. Searle. John Ireland: The Man and His Music. Midas Books, 1979.
