= List of fellows of the Royal College of Music =

This is a list of Fellows of the Royal College of Music.

Each year the Royal College of Music (RCM) bestows a number of honorary awards and fellowships on individuals who have made an exceptional contribution to life at the RCM and the wider musical community.

Unlike fellows of the Royal Academy of Music, it is not necessary that fellows of the RCM be former students at the College, although many have been. Many others are internationally known musicians with no associations with the College at all.

== List of fellows ==
- Claudio Abbado, 1989
- John Ackroyd, 1988
- Christopher Adey, 1989
- Hervey Alan, 1972
- Sir Walter Galpin Alcock, 1927
- Arthur Alexander, 1938
- Dimitri Alexeev, 2014
- Basil Allchin, 1928
- Sir Hugh Allen, 1938
- Sir Thomas Allen, 1987
- Martin André, 2014
- Herbert Kennedy Andrews, 1961
- Felix Andrievsky, 1993
- Hugo Anson, 1940
- Sir Thomas Armstrong, 1925
- Christopher Arnander, 1989
- Denis Arnold, 1981
- Sir Malcolm Arnold, 1983
- Cecil Aronowitz, 1971
- Dennis Arundell, 1970
- JJ Astor, 1937
- Katherine Atholl, 1925
- Richard Austin, 1962
- Simon Bainbridge, 1997
- Edgar Bainton, 1935
- George Baker, 1963
- Dame Janet Baker, 1976
- Andrew Ball, 2006
- Barbara Banner, 1966
- Sir Granville Bantock, 1934
- Evelyn Barbirolli, 1983
- Daniel Barenboim, 1981
- Kenneth Barritt, 1976
- John Barstow, 1981
- Marmaduke Barton, 1948
- Peter Bassano, 1997
- Sir Arnold Bax, 1927
- Hugh Bean, 1968
- Sir Thomas Beecham, 1922
- William Henry Bell, 1926
- Nicola Benedetti MBE, 2014
- George Benjamin, 1993
- Lionel Benson, 1942
- John Birch, 1981
- Roger Birnstingl, 2007
- John Bishop, 1957
- Nigel Black, 2010
- Sir Arthur Bliss, 1927
- George Blunden, 1989
- Daphne Boden, 1998
- Alfie Boe, 2013
- Barbara Boissard, 1975
- Nadia Boulanger, 1968
- Pierre Boulez, 1976
- Sir Adrian Boult, 1929
- Ann Boult, 1965
- Sir John Dykes Bower, 1954
- Colin Bradbury, 1979
- Julian Bream, 1981
- Sir Frederick Bridge, 1921
- Frank Bridge, 1924
- Edward Benjamin Britten, 1957
- Edward Brooks, 1996
- Antonio Brosa, 1962
- Sir Percy Buck, 1926
- Sir Ernest Bullock, 1929
- Herrick Bunney, 1996
- Sally Burgess, 2011
- John Burgh, 1994
- Margaret Cable, 1984
- George Caird, 1999
- David Calcutt, 1988
- Archie Camden, 1964
- Philip Cannon, 1972
- Clive Carey, 1924
- Patricia Carroll, 1997
- Louis Carus, 1983
- Pablo Casals, 1931
- Hugh Casson, 1987
- Levon Chilingirian, 1988
- George Christie, 1986
- Douglas Clarke, 1933
- Rebecca Clarke, 1963
- Anthony Cleaver, 2008
- Stephen Cleobury, 1993
- Frederic Cliffe, 1924
- Gordon Clinton, 1963
- Albert Coates, 1944
- Thomas Coats, 1966
- Walter Cobbett, 1948
- William Cole, 1968
- H. C. Colles, 1924
- Suzan Collier, 2021
- Michael Collins, 2010
- Cynthia Colville, 1948
- Edward Compton, 1979
- Dame Sarah Connolly, 2008
- Edgar Cook, 1946
- Jeremy Cox, 2004
- Douglas Craig, 1973
- Laurence Cummings, 2011
- Philip Cranmer, 1976
- Eileen Croxford, 1982
- Adrian Cruft, 1981
- Benedict Cruft, 2012
- Eugene Cruft, 1971
- John Cruft, 1961
- Lionel Dakers, 1980
- Nicholas Danby, 1986
- Paul Daniel, 2002
- Harold Darke, 1937
- Denys Darlow, 1984
- Beatrix Darnell, 1964
- Thurston Dart, 1965
- Colin Davis, 1969
- Harold Davies, 1931
- Meredith Davies, 1971
- Oliver Davies, 1977
- Sir Walford Davies, 1944
- Sir Andrew Davis, 1992
- Sir Colin Davis, 1969
- Archibald Davison, 1949
- Hubert Dawkes, 1968
- Gervase de Peyer, 1992
- Leopold de Rothschild, 1977
- Norman Del Mar, 1974
- Dorothy DeLay, 1987
- Frederick Delius, 1924
- John Denison, 1961
- Edward J. Dent, 1928
- Joan Dickson, 1970
- Stephen Dodgson, 1981
- Victor Doggett, 1993
- Plácido Domingo, 1982
- George Donaldson, 1922
- Barry Douglas, 1986
- Charles Douglas Home, 1980
- Margaret Douglas Home, 1965
- Sir Edward Downes, 1984
- Ralph Downes, 1969
- Bryan Drake, 1983
- John Drummond, 1995
- Jacqueline du Pré, 1976
- Anne Dudley, 2004
- Thomas Dunhill, 1924
- John Arthur St. Oswald Dykes, 1928
- Sir George Dyson, 1924
- Ruth Dyson, 1980
- Seymour Egerton, 1964
- Peter Element, 1982
- Sir Edward Elgar, 1921
- Esther Ellerman, 1976
- Pauline Elliott, 1972
- Veron Ellis, 2012
- Alexander Ernest Hall, 1954
- Sir Geraint Evans, 1981
- Christabel Falkner, 1974
- Sir Donald Keith Falkner, 1957
- Sidney Fell, 1972
- Eric Fenby, 1985
- George Fenton, 2011
- Gordon Fergus-Thompson, 2010
- Ruth Fermoy, 1983
- Raymond Ffennell, 1935
- Thomas Fielden, 1925
- Gerald Finley, 2007
- Michael Finnissy, 2008
- Warren Fisher, 1922
- Warren Fisher, 1948
- Edmond Fivet, 1988
- Amaryllis Fleming, 1994
- Myers Foggin, 1972
- Robert Jaffrey Forbes, 1933
- John Forster, 1989
- Phyllis Carey Foster, 1963
- Douglas Fox, 1973
- John Francis, 1971
- Sarah Francis, 2001
- Rodney Friend, 1989
- James Friskin, 1963
- Herbert Fryer, 1922
- Ursula Gale, 1964
- Sir James Galway, 1981
- MD Gambier-Parry, 1961
- Gustave Garcia, 1931
- Lilian Gaskell, 1964
- George Henry Gater, 1948
- Martin Gatt, 2002
- Ruth Gerald, 1985
- Sir Alexander Gibson, 1972
- Gerald Gifford, 1988
- Kenneth Gilbert, 2001
- Ruth Gipps, 1972
- Amanda Glauert, 2014
- Dame Evelyn Glennie, 1991
- Jane Glover, 1993
- Sir Dan Godfrey, 1944
- Alexander Goehr, 1981
- Sir Reginald Goodall, 1981
- Roy Goodman, 2005
- Eugene Goossens, 1938
- Léon Goossens, 1962
- Marie Goossens, 1981
- Sidonie Goossens, 1981
- June Gordon, 1966
- Michael Gough Mathews, 1972
- Peter Graeme, 1979
- David Graham, 2011
- Wilfred Greenhouse Allt, 1964
- Edward Gregson, 2000
- Sir Charles Groves, 1961
- Douglas Guest, 1964
- Natalia Gutman, 2006
- Patrick Hadley, 1936
- Sir William Henry Hadow, 1937
- Ida Haendel, 2000
- Bernard Haitink, 1984
- Lloyd Hall, 1999
- Kerrison Hamilton Camden, 1992
- Vernon Handley, 1972
- Nikolaus Harnoncourt, 1996
- Heather Harper, 1988
- Lynn Harrell, 1994
- Martin Harris, 1988
- Michael Harris, 2009
- William Harris, 1936
- Eric Harrison, 1968
- Eiddwen Harrhy, 2012
- Fritz Hart, 1930
- Sir Hamilton Harty, 1921
- Jonathan Harvey, 1994
- Kevin Hathway, 1998
- Henry Havergal, 1968
- Brian Hawkins, 1991
- Hearn Harry Stubbs, 1949
- Edward Heath, 1966
- Sir Bernard Heinze, 1925
- Gavin Henderson, 2001
- Trevor Herbert, 2007
- Alan Hervey, 1972
- Arthur Hill, 1938
- Janet Hilton, 2005
- Leonard Hirsch, 1971
- Lilian Hochhauser, 1991
- David Hockings, 2013
- Gustav Holst, 1938
- Imogen Holst, 1966
- Wolfgang Holzmair, 2008
- Antony Hopkins, 1964
- Joseph Horovitz, 1981
- Ian Horsburgh, 1988
- Colin Horsley, 1973
- John Hosier, 1981
- David Hoult, 2004
- Elgar Howarth, 1997
- Herbert Howells, 1933
- Frank Howes, 1938
- Marjorie Humby, 1965
- Ian Hunter, 1991
- Peter Hurford, 1987
- Christopher Hyde-Smith, 1985
- Professor Barry Ife, 2013
- Niel Immelman, 2000
- John Ireland, 1931
- Leonard Isaacs, 1983
- Steven Isserlis, 2002
- Gordon Jacob, 1946
- Reginald Jacques, 1937
- Ivor James, 1928
- Stephen Johns, 2014
- Peter Jonas, 1989
- Dame Gwyneth Jones, 1971
- Ian Jones, 2014
- Kenneth Victor Jones, 1981
- Philip Jones, 1983
- Rosemary Joshua, 2009
- Helen Just, 1966
- Simon Keenlyside, 2012
- Charles Kennedy Scott, 1961
- Ivor Keys, 1982
- Nicholas David King, 1992
- Dame Thea King, 1973
- Margaret Kingsley, 1994
- Herbert Kinsey, 1950
- Percival Kirby, 1924
- Dame Emma Kirkby, 2004
- Charles Herbert Kitson, 1928
- Hilda Klein, 1965
- Gerald Knight, 1968
- Oliver Knussen, 1989
- Helmut Lachenmann, 2010
- Michael Laird, 1993
- John Lambert, 1976
- Philip Langridge, 1997
- Stephen Lansberry, 1989
- Vanessa Latarche, 2010
- Richard Latham, 1965
- Sylvia Latham, 1991
- David Lawman, 1991
- Colin Lawson, 2005
- Sir Philip Ledger, 1983
- Nicola Frances LeFanu 1995
- Kenneth Leighton, 1982
- Raymond Leppard, 1983
- WH Leslie, 1924
- Anthony Lewis, 1971
- Henry Ley, 1928
- John Lill, 1970
- Redvers Llewellyn, 1973
- David Lloyd-Jones, 1988
- Lord Andrew Lloyd Webber, 1988
- Julian Lloyd Webber, 1994
- William Lloyd Webber, 1963
- James Lockhart, 1987
- C Thornton Lofthouse, 1951
- Kathleen Long, 1954
- Dame Felicity Lott, 2005
- George Loughlin, 1961
- David Lumsden, 1980
- Witold Lutosławski, 1987
- Dame Elisabeth Lutyens, 1982
- Dame Moura Lympany, 1995
- Robert Lyttleton, 1935
- Lorin Maazel, 1981
- Terence MacDonagh, 1963
- Hugh Macdonald, 1987
- Sir Alexander Mackenzie, 1922
- Sir Charles Mackerras, 1987
- Neil Mackie, 1996
- Catherine MacKintosh, 1994
- Hilary Macklin, 1962
- Sir Ernest MacMillan, 1933
- George MacMillan, 1927
- Dame Elizabeth Maconchy, 1984
- Margaret Major, 1992
- George Malcolm, 1974
- John Manduell, 1980
- Jane Manning, 1998
- Veronica Mansfield, 1968
- David Mason, 1992
- Sir Stanley Marchant, 1937
- Sir Neville Marriner, 1981
- Wayne Marshall, 2010
- Diego Masson, 1994
- Valerie Masterson, 1992
- Tobias Matthay, 1933
- Colin Matthews, 2007
- Humphrey Maud, 2002
- Sir Peter Maxwell Davies, 1994
- Sir Robert Mayer, 1938
- Ettore Mazzoleni, 1961
- John McCabe, 1984
- John McCaro, 1980
- James Paul McCartney, 1995
- John McCaw, 1980
- Sir John Blackwood McEwen, 1925
- David McKenna, 1959
- Reginald McKenna, 1933
- Sir William McKie, 1957
- Hugh McLean, 1985
- Kathleen McQuitty, 1958
- Simon McVeigh, 2007
- Zubin Mehta, 1989
- Isolde Menges, 1954
- Lord Yehudi Menuhin, 1965
- Frank Merrick, 1938
- Mark Messenger, 2009
- Olivier Messiaen, 1975
- Connie Middleton, 2001
- Susan Milan, 1999
- Anthony Milner, 1973
- Donald Mitchell, 2004
- William Mival, 2008
- Douglas Moore, 1968
- Gerald Moore, 1980
- Gillian Moore, 2000
- Charles Morley, 1933
- Douglas Morpeth, 1985
- R. O. Morris, 1938
- Angus Morrison, 1954
- Peter Morrison, 1964
- The Countess of Munster, 1976
- Michael Musgrave, 2005
- Ivor Newton, 1966
- Arthur Nickson, 1963
- Noel Nickson, 1977
- Tatiana Nikolayeva, 1991
- Humphrey Norrington, 1999
- Sir Roger Norrington, 1992
- Ruth Nye, 2008
- Leslie O’Brien, 1979
- James O’Donnell, 2009
- W. Arundel Orchard, 1921
- Robin Orr, 1965
- Nigel Osborne, 1996
- Igor Oistrakh, 1991
- Ruth Packer, 1968
- Arnold Palmer, 1942
- Ernest Palmer, 1921
- Gordon Palmer, 1965
- Adelaide Parker, 1966
- David Parkhouse, 1972
- Sir Walter Parratt, 1921
- Geoffrey Parsons, 1987
- Anthony Payne, 2005
- Sir Peter Pears, 1970
- Donald Peart, 1957
- Lady Delia Peel, 1954
- Sir Krzysztof Penderecki, 1993
- Murray Perahia, 1987
- Allen Percival, 1973
- Frank Percival Probyn, 1954
- Itzhak Perlman, 1983
- J Harvey Phillips, 1963
- Linda Phillips, 1972
- Anthony Pini, 1972
- Trevor Pinnock, 1996
- William Pleeth, 1988
- Stuart Pleydell-Bouverie, 1942
- Harry Plunket Greene, 1935
- Edwin Polkinhorne, 1946
- Brian Pollard, 1998
- Lord Ponsonby, 1966
- Douglas Pope, 1963
- Richard Popplewell, 1982
- George Pratt, 1999
- Simon Preston, 1986
- Curtis Price, 2002
- Daniel Price, 1925
- Humphrey Procter-Gregg, 1963
- Sir John Pritchard, 1983
- Leo Quayle, 1961
- Ruth Railton, 1965
- Itzhak Rashkovsky, 1998
- Ernest Read, 1962
- John Redcliffe-Maud, 1964
- W. H. Reed, 1928
- Eillen Reynolds, 1976
- Sviatoslav Richter, 1992
- Frederick Riddle, 1968
- Alan Ridout, 1982
- Achille Rivarde, 1921
- Bernard Roberts, 1981
- Jeremy Dale Roberts, 1991
- James Robertson, 1964
- Marisa Robles, 1983
- Sir Landon Ronald, 1924
- Cyril Rootham, 1933
- Charles Rosen, 1997
- Michael Rosewell, 2001
- Mstislav Rostropovich, 1983
- Alan Rowlands, 1982
- Edwin Roxburgh, 1976
- Patricia Rozario, 2014
- Gennady Rozhdestvensky, 1993
- Edmund Rubbra, 1982
- Arthur Rubinstein, 1974
- John Russell, 1979
- Gary Ryan, 2013
- Suhail Saba, 1992
- Simon John Sacha, 1992
- Stanley Sadie, 1994
- Esa-Pekka Salonen, 1995
- Timothy Salter, 2004
- Albert Sammons, 1944
- Harold Samuel, 1924
- Sir Malcolm Sargent, 1929
- András Schiff, 1992
- Gottfried Scholz, 2002
- Peter Schreier, 2002
- Graziella Sciutti, 1992
- Marion Margaret Scott, 1953
- Humphrey Searle, 1969
- Nicholas Sears, 2012
- Andrés Segovia, 1962
- Phyllis Sellick, 1974
- Herbert Sharpe, 1921
- Martin Shaw, 1958
- Howard Shelley, 1993
- Frederick Shinn, 1944
- Bernard Shore, 1957
- JT Shrimpton, 1971
- Jean Sibelius, 1933
- Millicent Silver, 1976
- Arnold Smith, 1928
- Cuthbert Smith, 1958
- Cyril Smith, 1958
- James Smith, 1954
- Joanna Smith, 1981
- Morris Smith, 1963
- Russell Smythe, 2014
- Alexander Sokolov, 2014
- Yonty Solomon, 1996
- Sir Georg Solti, 1980
- Sir Arthur Somervell, 1930
- Donald Somervell, 1948
- Maurice Sons, 1937
- William Squire, 1924
- Meriel St Clair, 1972
- Sir John Stainer, 1961
- Sir Charles Villiers Stanford, 1921
- Jack Steadman, 1972
- Bernard Stevens, 1966
- Katharine Stewart-Murray, 1944
- Leopold Stokowski, 1937
- Ian Stoutzker, 1969
- Richard Strauss, 1934
- Harry Stubbs, 1922
- Stanley Stubbs, 1921
- Marion Studholme, 1983
- Herbert Sumsion, 1961
- Dame Joan Sutherland, 1981
- Robert Sutherland, 2005
- Freda Swain, 1962
- Roderick Swanston, 1994
- Melvyn Tan, 2000
- Geoffrey Tankard, 1961
- Colin Taylor, 1962
- Edgar Kendall Taylor, 1954
- Robert Tear, 1980
- Sir George Thalben-Ball, 1951
- Reginald Thatcher, 1942
- Kevin Thompson, 2006
- Gordon Thorne, 1961
- Charles Thorton Lofthouse, 1951
- Sir Michael Tippett, 1961
- Ernest Tomlinson, 1957
- Paul Tortelier, 1979
- Arturo Toscanini, 1937
- Sir Donald Tovey, 1924
- Brian Trowell, 1977
- Carrie Tubb, 1976
- Barry Tuckwell, 1993
- Mark-Anthony Turnage, 2002
- Dame Eva Turner, 1974
- John Tyrrell, 2009
- Dame Mitsuko Uchida, 1998
- Lyndon Van der Pump, 1994
- Jaroslav Vanecek, 1979
- Ralph Vaughan Williams, 1922
- Ursula Vaughan Williams, 1976
- Maxim Vengerov, 2000
- Roger Vignoles, 1997
- Albert Visetti, 1921
- Sidney Pearce Waddington, 1922
- Rick Wakeman, 2012
- Edward Walker, 1972
- Ernest Walker, 1933
- Sarah Walker, 1987
- John Wallace, 2007
- Bernard Walton, 1968
- Richard Walton, 1968
- Sir William Walton, 1937
- David Ward, 1972
- Eleanor Warren, 1994
- William Waterhouse, 2008
- Fanny Waterman, 1971
- Harold Watkins Shaw, 1974
- Angus Watson, 1986
- Sydney Watson, 1948
- Sir David Webster, 1964
- Dame Gillian Weir, 2000
- Judith Weir, 2006
- Anthony Weldon, 1989
- Sir Jack Westrup, 1961
- Seymour Whinyates, 1962
- William Edward Whitehouse, 1921
- W Whittaker, 1930
- Richard Wilberforce, 1965
- Philip Wilkinson, 1970
- Mabel Willard Richie, 1969
- Sir David Willcocks, 1971
- John Williams, 1983
- Arthur Wilson, 1995
- Henry Wilson, 1958
- John Wilson, 2011
- Marie Wilson, 1971
- Steuart Wilson, 1950
- Michael Winfield, 1992
- Charles Wood, 1921
- Sir Henry Wood, 1924
- Patrick Wright, 1994
- Roger Wright, 2007
- Yu Chun Yee, 1988
- Wing-sie Yip 2010
- Robert Younger, 1924
- Irina Zaritskaya, 1999
- Yossi Zivoni, 2006

== See also ==
- Associate of the Royal College of Music (ARCM)
- Licentiate of the Royal Academy of Music (LRAM)
