= FRCM =

FRCM may refer to:

- Fiber-reinforced cementitious matrix
- Fellow of the Royal College of Music
