= Barbara Cass-Beggs =

English-Canadian music teacher (1904–1990)

- Born: November 10, 1904; Nottingham, England
- Died: September 13, 1990 (aged 85); Ottawa, Canada
- Education: Royal College of Music
- Occupations: Folk song collection; Singer; Teacher
- Years active: 1929–1990
- Spouse: David Cass (m. 1932; died 1986)
- Children: 3

Barbara Cass-Beggs (November 10, 1904 – September 13, 1990) was an English-born Canadian folk song collector, singer and teacher. She was director of the University Settlement Music School at the University of Toronto and was a faculty member of the Regina Conservatory of Music as vocal teacher. Cass-Beggs set up the Regina Junior Concery Society in 1957 and collected folk songs for use in teaching. She was a private music educator to children and did pre-school teacher music courses at Algonquin College's early childhood education. An award and scholarship are named after Cass-Beggs whose personal objects are in the collection of the Provincial Archives of Saskatchewan.

== Biography ==
On November 10, 1904, Cass-Beggs was born in Nottingham, England. She began taking piano lessons at the age of seven, and went on to matriculate to the Royal College of Music, studying composition, pedagogy, piano and voice under Basil Allchin, Percy Buck, C. C. Collier, Herbert Howells and Reginald Jacques. Cass-Beggs obtained an Associate of the Royal College of Music degree and a Licentiate of the Royal Academy of Music diploma between 1927 and 1928. From 1929 to 1939, she educated young people in music and gave song recitals of English folk songs as a mezzo-soprano in both London and Oxford. She relocated to Canada in 1939, surviving a torpedo attack on the SS Athenia passenger liner she was sailing in that September. Cass-Beggs had been a member of the 'Oriana' Madrigal Singers and the first soprano of the London Charterhouse Quartet. She continued to perform recitals of folk songs before World War II closed down most of Canada.

Cass-Beggs served as director of Toronto's University Settlement Music School at the University of Toronto from 1945 to 1952 and taught music classes. In 1948, she helped to compile a report used by the lawyer Andrew Brewin in his preparation of Canada's first introduced pay equality legislation. In February 1956, Cass-Beggs joined the faculty of the Regina Conservatory of Music as vocal teacher. In Regina, she authored her philosophy that was subsequently published as To Listen, To Like, To Learn as he consolidated working with young children. Cass-Beggs also established the Regina Junior Concert Society in 1957 without funding or volunteers, becoming its honorary president for life. Throughout this time, she collected Canadian folk songs to be used in teaching, having been shocked.at the low amount of collections of Canadian folk songs there were. Cass-Beggs released the recording Folksongs of Saskatchewan to reflect her research in 1963. She left the Regina Conservatory of Music the following year. In 1969, Cass-Beggs commenced pre-school teacher music courses at Algonquin College's early childhood education in Ottawa, which saw her commute from Manitoba via plane every week.

She was vice-president of the Canadian Society for Traditional Music between 1968 and 1971 and then from 1972 to 1974. Between 1972 and 1976, Cass-Beggs educated music to children privately in Vancouver and thereafter in Ottawa. By 1983, she had an enrolment of almost 250 children at her Ottawa Listen, Like Learn pre-school program, and gave two musical courses for mothers who were musical-literate. Cass-Beggs agreed to continue educating infant since parents kept asking her to teach younger children. She presented a paper at an international education and technology conference in Tel Aviv in 1984 and was invited to teach baby/parent classes in Vienna two years later. Cass-Beggs was invited by Ann Limor, a Bostonian immigrant to Israel, to train instructors and present workshops in Haifa and Jerusalem in 1988. She returned to Jerusalem in April 1989 to do conduct training courses and more workshops. It was there Cass-Beggs established a Listen Like Learn Association. She presented the paper How music is first introduced as a keynote speaker at the International Society for Music Education conference in Finland in August 1990. Cass-Beggs was an active member of Planned Parenthood, the Canadian Voice of Women for Peace, Oxfam and was a founder member of Regina's Unitarian Church.

== Methodology ==
She used a method that aimed to assist children discover the relation of music to other arts forms and was also concerned with pitch and rhythm basic training. The program was developed for children aged between two and six years old, and incorporated exercises to get babies and their mothers musically interested in Cass-Beggs's belief children have a natural rhythm. Older children were encouraged to be independent from their mothers in her classes following time to adjust. She attempted to demonstrate that babies who were sung to and hear soft, rhythmic music would develop a liking for music and have better concentration and develop speech quicker.

== Personal life ==
She was married to the Saskatchewan Power Corporation president David Cass-Beggs from 1932 to his death of cancer in February 1986. Cass-Beggs and her husband each agreed to take on their respective surnames when they married. They had three children, including Rosemary, who edited the 1982 music anthology The Penguin Book of Rounds. On September 13, 1990, she died in an Ottawa hospital. A memorial service was held for her at the Unitarian Church in Ottawa on September 23.

== Legacy ==
The Association for Early Childhood Education presented her with the Children's Service Award in 1982. Algonquin College named the non-renewable Barbara Cass-Beggs Memorial Fund scholarship after her. In November 1992, Planned Parenthood Ottawa began awarding the Barbara Cass-Beggs Memorial Award for Women's Reproductive Rights to commemorate her women's reproductive rights work. The Provincial Archives of Saskatchewan holds a collection of objects connected to Cass-Beggs. They include her folksong complications, audiotapes of songs, her political life in Canada and England as well as her personal papers.
