= Cruft (disambiguation) =

Cruft is a jargon word for anything that is left over, redundant and getting in the way.

Cruft may also refer to:

== People ==
- Adrian Cruft (1921–1987), British composer
- Charles Cruft (general) (1826–1883), American teacher, lawyer, railroad executive, and a Union general during the American Civil War
- Charles Cruft (showman) (1852–1938), British showman who founded Crufts dog show
- Eugene Cruft (1887–1976), British double bass player

== See also ==
- Crufts, a dog show
