= Teacher Didn't Tell Me =

1957 British TV series

Teacher Didn't Tell Me is a British television series which aired on the BBC during 1957. Hosted by the pianist Sidney Harrison, it was described in the Radio Times as "a musical revelation in three episodes".

Little else is known about the programme, though Harrison published an autobiographical book called Teacher never told me in 1961. Harrison also appeared in other BBC TV programming of the 1950s, including Piano Lesson and How to Play the Piano.
