= Ruth Dyson (keyboardist) =

English keyboardist

- Born: 28 March 1917; St Pancras, London, England
- Died: 16 August 1997 (aged 80); Guildford, Surrey, England
- Education: Royal College of Music
- Occupation: Keyboardist
- Years active: 1936–1997
- Spouse: Edward Eastaway Thomas (m. 1964; died 1996)

Ruth Dyson (28 March 1917 – 16 August 1997) was an English keyboardist who performed on the harpsichord and piano. She began playing while studying at the Royal College of Music and was primarily attracted to the English Baroque. Dyson toured Europe, frequently broadcast on the BBC, made several recordings for the BBC Archives, and worked with the Leith Hill Musical Festival. She taught at the Royal College of Music from 1961 until her retirement from teaching in 1987. Dyson contributed to various musical journals, including The Oxford Companion to Music. Her library and most of her instruments were left to the Royal College of Music.

== Early life ==
Dyson was born on 28 March 1917, in St Pancras, London; she was the only child of the doctor and Royal Army Medical Corps captain Ernest Andrews Dyson and his wife Minnie, née Cornish. Her childhood was spent and much of her life as an adult in Dorking. Dyson took part in one of the inaugural children's day at the Leith Hill Musical Festival when she was five. She was home-schooled and studied piano under Angus Morrison, harmony with Herbert Howells and violin with W. H. Reed at the Royal College of Music. At the college, she became inspired by the performance of Arne: Sonata No. 3 by Kathleen Long on the piano and took an interest in the museum's collection of old keyboard instruments.

== Career ==
Dyson began playing the clavichord and harpischord at the home of the musicologist Susi Jeans, and brought a Robert Goble-made harpsichord. Dyson was mainly drawn to the English Baroque, particularly John Blow and others such as Thomas Arne, Thomas Chilcot, and Henry Purcell. She made her debut on the piano at Wigmore Hall with the London Women's String Orchestra on 15 November 1941. During the Second World War, Dyson did auxiliary nursing at Dorking General Hospital for the Red Cross, taught music to evacuated children at Dorking's War Evacuation Day Nursery, and toured in factories, hospitals and military camps.

She continued to play the harpsichord and piano in piano concertos in many primary British orchestras and frequently gave solo recitals on both instruments during the post-war era. Dyson undertook tours of Europe with sponsorship with the British Council and frequently broadcast on the BBC for more than three decades, several of which were the maiden performances of works by contemporary artists for early keyboard instruments. She additionally made several recordings for the BBC Archives on instruments from collections like the Colt Clavier Collection and the Victoria and Albert Museum. In the late 1940s Dyson worked with the Leith Hill Musical Festival and served as the festival's librarian, lasting in the role from 1948 to 1960.

In 1961, Dyson returned to the Royal College of Music to teach, and became professor of both harpsichord and piano three years later. She also took up a lectureship in the history of early keyboard instruments. Some of her students included Carol Cooper, Penny Cave, Melvyn Tan, Robert Woolley and Sophie Yates among others. Dyson invited her students for a pre-examination of their rituals at her home. She taught in fluent German at Hamburg's Telemann Society in 1963 and in French to the harpsichord world forum in Paris in 1976. At the 1972 Bruges International Festival, she represented the United Kingdom as an adjudicator. Dyson was a contributor to various musical journals, was a member of the Galpin Society, did a recital of classical and modern harpsichords at the Purcell Room, and authored an article on the history of the piano in The Oxford Companion to Music in 1979. In the same year, she began regularly appearing at the Haslemere Festival and tutored at the Dolmetsch Summer Schools.

Dyson was made a fellow of the Royal College of Music in 1980. She was elected vice-president of the Leith Hill Musical Festival following year. In 1982, she recorded two volumes of clavichord pieces of her harmony professor Herbert Howells to celebrate his 90th birthday. Throughout the 1980s and 1990s, Dyson and the harpsichordist and singer Peter Medhurst made recordings, including a collection of Schubert songs at the Colt Collection and the 1988 recordings For Two to Play about every double-harpsichord works up to Wolfgang Amadeus Mozart's era. She retired from the Royal College of Music in 1987, the same year Dyson's 70th birthday recital Dyson's Delight was broadcast to mark her long association with the BBC. Dyson made her final appearance at the Leith Hill Musical Festival in 1995, and her final public appearance in Lisbon in March 1997.

== Personal life ==
Dyson married the joint intelligence bureau research officer Edward Eastaway Thomas on 2 May 1964. They remained married until his death in 1996. Dyson was the stepmother of a son and daughter.

== Death ==
On the final day of the 1997 Dolmetsch Summer School (16 August), Dyson had a heart attack, and died at the Royal Surrey County Hospital, Guildford, Surrey. She was buried at St Martin's Church, Dorking.

== Personality and legacy ==
According to Margaret Campbell in The Independent, Dyson was "charming, unaffected and modest despite the fact that she had an incredibly scholarly mind" and generous towards fellow musicians. Shelagh Godwin of The Guardian noted Dyson was regarded by other musicians as "a musical mother". She remained in close contact with acquaintances and friends during her life. Dyson's library and a majority of her instruments were left to the Royal College of Music. Some of her recordings were stored in the BBC Archives.
