= Basil Deane =

British musicologist (1928–2006)

Samuel Basil Deane (27 May 1928 – 23 September 2006) was a musicologist and academic. After studying at Queen's University Belfast and under Étienne Pasquier in Paris, he lectured at the universities of Glasgow, Melbourne and Nottingham, produced biographies of Roussel, Cherubini and Hoddinott, and co-presented several television programmes about music. He held a number of high-level academic posts; he was James Rossiter Hoyle Professor of Music at the University of Sheffield (1968–1974), Professor of Music at the University of Manchester (1974–1980), director of the Hong Kong Academy for Performing Arts (1983–1987) and Peyton and Barber Professor of Music at the University of Birmingham (1987–1992). Deane was also music director of the Arts Council (1980–1983), during which time he prioritised funding for new touring groups, but oversaw the funding cuts which forced the D'Oyly Carte Opera Company to close.

== Life ==
Deane was born on 27 May 1928 in Bangor, County Down, the son of Canon Richard Deane who was rector of St Thomas's, Belfast. After the Methodist College in Belfast and The Royal School, Armagh, he was educated at Queen's University Belfast; his parents did not encourage his interest in studying music at university (he had learnt to play the cello), so his first undergraduate degree, obtained in 1948, was in French and German. With the recommendation of Ivor Keys, his father allowed him to enrol on the new Bachelor of Music degree at Queen's, which he completed in 1950. He then studied the cello in Paris under Étienne Pasquier.

In 1953 Deane was appointed to an assistant lectureship at the University of Glasgow, and was promoted to a full lectureship three years later. He also embarked on a PhD on Albert Roussel, which was awarded by Glasgow in 1958. The following year, he moved to the University of Melbourne to be a senior lecturer; while there, he and Bill Fitzwater presented a programme on ABC called What is Music?. They went on to present Cities of Music and Music is..., as well as a biography of Percy Grainger for the BBC (1969) and a documentary about Erik Satie (1972). Deane returned to England in 1966 to lecture at the University of Nottingham. In 1968, he was appointed James Rossiter Hoyle Professor of Music at the University of Sheffield, and served in that post until 1975 when he became professor of music at the University of Manchester. In 1980, he became music director for the Arts Council; he cut funding to the D'Oyly Carte Opera Company (which "caused him some pain", according to The Guardian), but allocated greater funding to Opera North and the Contemporary Music Network. Then three years later moved to Hong Kong to be director of the Academy for Performing Arts. He then held – as his final academic post – the Peyton and Barber Professorship of Music at the University of Birmingham between 1987 and 1992, when he retired. While at Birmingham, he established a student-run music festival in the final week of the summer term.

Deane's retirement came a year after the death of his wife, Norma (née Greig). In 1994, he moved back to Northern Ireland with his partner Ana de Brito and worked with the Belfast Chamber Music Society. He settled in Portaferry, County Down, before moving to Matosinhos in Portugal. He died on 23 September 2006. The Independent remarked in his obituary that he "enjoyed an energetic academic career [... and] left a trail of institutional and pedagogical improvements behind him". John Turner wrote in The Guardian that Deane's career helped to "build a new musical heritage" in the United Kingdom; he "was the urbane and politically adept director of music for the Arts Council of Great Britain during one of its most difficult periods".

A commemorative concert for Deane was held at the Bridgewater Hall, Manchester in September 2007, and was the inspiration for a tribute CD issued in 2013. Two songs, The Rose Tree and I am of Ireland, setting W B Yeats, were found among his papers, with just the vocal line. They were arranged (as specified by Deane) for soprano, recorder and cello by Raymond Warren.

== Selected publications ==
- Albert Roussel (Barrie and Rockliff, 1961).
- Cherubini (Oxford University Press, 1965).
- Alun Hoddinott (University of Wales Press, 1978).

Academic offices
Preceded by Stewart Deas	James Rossiter Hoyle Professor of Music, University of Sheffield; 1968–1975	Succeeded by Edward Garden
Preceded by Ivor Keys	Peyton and Barber Professor of Music, University of Birmingham; 1987–1992	Succeeded by Colin Timms
