= Peyton and Barber Professor of Music =

Professorship; named chair at the University of Birmingham, England

The Peyton and Barber Professorship of Music is a named chair at the University of Birmingham. It was established in 1904 when Richard Peyton, a local businessman, endowed it with £10,000. The inaugural holder was the composer Edward Elgar, who left the post in 1908. As of 2018, the chair is held by Andrew Kirkman.

== Peyton and Barber Professors of Music ==
- 1904–1908: Sir Edward William Elgar, 1st Baronet, OM, GCVO.
- 1908–1934: Sir Granville Ransome Bantock.
- 1934–1944: Christian Victor Noel Hope Hely-Hutchinson.
- 1944–1946: Sir Jack Allan Westrup.
- 1947–1968: Sir Anthony Carey Lewis, CBE.
- 1968–1986: Ivor Christopher Banfield Keys, CBE.
- 1987–1992: Samuel Basil Deane.
- 1992–2012: Colin Ronald Timms.
- 2013–present: Andrew Kirkman.
