= Musical Interpretation Research =

Musical Interpretation Research (MIR) is a series of monographs on the performance of classical music authored by Nils-Göran Areskoug (Sundin). The focus is on integrating the perspectives of the audience, artist and musicologist alike. The series covers aesthetic experience in music appreciation with the aim of bridging theory and practice of interpretive processes among performer and conductor, by providing in-depth analyses of masterworks, elaborating a methodology for researching interpretative cognition and designing a set of criteria for excellence in music performance. The publications, originating in a project pioneering new music research in the Nordic countries at Uppsala University and Stockholm School of Music, were funded initially by grants from The Bank of Sweden Tercentenary Foundation and Torsten and Ragnar Söderberg Foundations jointly, during 1979–1988.

The MIR series was first presented in 1983 at University of California San Diego, La Jolla (lecture in the C.A.R.L. series) and on invitation by Professor David Lewin at a visit to the Music Department, Harvard University; then premiered at a lecture-performance event in Stockholm, Sweden, on May 10, 1984, according to the press release issued by the Royal Swedish Academy of Music.

Subsequent research for the MIR series contains 'real world new music research', including dialogues with leading orchestra conductors (such as Sergiu Celibidache) and instrumentalists (pianists and violinists such as Hans Leygraf, Guido Agosti and Isaac Stern, respectively) along with studies of their rehearsal working processes.

== Editions ==
- Musical Interpretation in Performance - Excerpts from Musical Interpretation Research, MIR Vols 1–2. Mirage edition (1983), Växjö, Sweden. 96 pages. ISSN 0349-988X, ISBN 91-86636-00-6. (In English)
- Introduktion till Musikalisk Interpretation och Interpretationsforskning - (Musical Interpretation Research, MIR volume 1). Mirage edition, Växjö, Sweden. 420 pages, 2nd edition (1984). ISSN 0349-988X, ISBN 91-86636-03-0. (In Swedish with an Introduction in English)
- Musikalisk interpretationsanalys - (Musical Interpretation Research, MIR volume 2). Mirage edition, Växjö, Sweden. 453 pages, 2nd edition (1984). ISSN 0349-988X, ISBN 91-97040-31-2. (In Swedish with a Synopsis in English)

== Related editions ==
- Musical interpretation in performance: Music theory, musicology and musical consciousness, Journal of Musicological Research, 1984, Vol.5(1), p. 93-129, (Peer Reviewed Journal), ISSN 0141-1896; E-ISSN 1547-7304; DOI: 10.1080/01411898408574547
- Skapande interpretation och musikalisk instudering, ISBN 91-970403-6-3, Stockholm : Mirage, 1983. (In Swedish)
- Aesthetic criteria for musical interpretation - a study of the contemporary performance of Western notated instrumental music after 1750, ISBN 951-34-0336-X, Jyväskylä : Univ. of Jyväskylä, 1994, 665 pages Series: Jyväskylä studies in the arts, ISSN 0075-4633; 45, Dissertation, PhD Thesis, Jyväskylä University, Finland. (In English)

== See also ==
- The Interpretation of Music
