= Ivor Keys =

British musicologist (1919–1995)

Ivor Christopher Banfield Keys, CBE (8 March 1919 – 7 July 1995) was a musicologist and academic.

== Life ==
Keys was born on 8 March 1919, the son of Christopher Richard Keys. Described as a "child prodigy", In 1934 Keys became the youngest Fellow of the Royal College of Organists while at school at Christ's Hospital; having already earned an ARCO diploma in 1933. There he was a pupil of Craig Sellar Lang. From 1936 through 1938 he studied at the Royal College of Music (RCM) with George Thalben-Ball.

After attending the RCM, Keys went up to Christ Church, Oxford, in 1938 where he was the organ scholar and assistant organist. During the Second World War, he served in Kenya, and resumed his education at Christ Church on demobilisation in 1946. In 1947, he was appointed to a lectureship at Queen's University Belfast; he helped to create the Bachelor of Music degree programme at Queen's. Promotion to a readership followed in 1950, and when the university created the Hamilton Harty Professorship of Music, Keys became the first holder in 1951. He moved to the University of Nottingham in 1954 to take up its first Chair of Music; while there, he oversaw a period of expansion in its music department and helped to foster links between the university and the people of Nottingham, some of whom sang in the Nottingham Bach Society. He moved again, in 1968, to take up the Peyton and Barber Professorship of Music at the University of Birmingham; he worked with the Birmingham School of Music to incorporate performance into the university's music degree and established a degree jointly in music, drama and dance. On retirement in 1986, he was appointed to an emeritus professorship at Birmingham. In the meantime, he had been president of the Royal College of Organists (1968–70) and was a long-serving member of its council.

Appointed a Commander of the Order of the British Empire in 1976, Keys died on 7 July 1995. In an obituary in The Independent, Basil Deane wrote that "the bare outline of Key's university career gives little idea of his influence on the musical life of Britain as a whole. His interests and activities were legion". The Times recorded that he "might easily have become an international pianist, organist or conductor ... But he chose a different career ... his unquenchable thirst for knowledge and his compulsive need to share his enthusiasm drew him inevitably into scholarship and teaching at the highest levels."

== Selected publications and compositions ==
=== Books ===
- The Texture of Music: from Purcell to Brahms (Dobson, 1961).
- Brahms Chamber Music (British Broadcasting Corporation, 1974).
- Mozart: His Music in his Life (Holmes and Meier, 1980).
- Johannes Brahms (Christopher Helm, 1989).

=== Compositions ===
Keys composed a clarinet concerto which won the Festival of Britain Prize for Composition in 1951. His other compositions included a Magnificat and a Nunc Dimittis; in his entry in Who's Who, he also listed a sonata for the cello and the piano; his completion of Franz Schubert’s Gretchens Bitte; Prayer for Pentecostal Fire; and The Road to the Stable.

Academic offices
Preceded by Chair created	Hamilton Harty Professor of Music, Queen's University Belfast; 1951–1954	Succeeded by Philip Cranmer
Preceded by Chair created	Chair of Music, University of Nottingham; 1954–1968	Succeeded by Denis Arnold
Preceded by Sir Anthony Lewis	Peyton and Barber Professor of Music, University of Birmingham; 1968–1986	Succeeded by Basil Deane
