= Eric Clarke (musicologist) =

Eric Fillenz Clarke, FBA (born 31 July 1955) has been the Heather Professor of Music at the University of Oxford since 2007. He was educated at the University of Sussex, where he obtained a BA and an MA in music, and then at the University of Exeter, obtaining a PhD in psychology. He taught at the City University London from 1981 to 1993, becoming reader in music in 1991. He was James Rossiter Hoyle Professor of Music at the University of Sheffield from 1993 to 2007, when he moved to Oxford University. His publications include Ways of Listening (2005) and various articles on the perception and psychology of music. He was appointed a Fellow of the British Academy (FBA) in July 2010.

Academic offices
Preceded by Edward Garden	James Rossiter Hoyle Professor of Music, University of Sheffield; 1993–2007	Succeeded by Simon P. Keefe
Preceded by Reinhard Strohm	Heather Professor of Music, University of Oxford; 2007 to present	Incumbent
