= Denis Vaughan =

Australian conductor (1926–2017)

- Denis Vaughan conducts a concert with the performance of some pieces from Falstaff in the great hall of the Milan Conservatory in 1963
- Born: Denis Edward Vaughan; June 6, 1926; Melbourne, Australia
- Died: July 7, 2017 (aged 91); London, England
- Education: University of Melbourne (BMus), Royal College of Music
- Occupations: Orchestral conductor, multi-instrumentalist, lottery campaigner
- Years active: 1950–2017
- Known for: Driving force behind the creation of the UK National Lottery

Denis Edward Vaughan (Melbourne, 6 June 1926 – London, 7 July 2017) was an Australian-born orchestral conductor and multi-instrumentalist. In 1950, he joined the Royal Philharmonic Orchestra in London and by 1966 had settled in Rome. He was a campaigner for wider access to arts and culture for young people, promoting the health benefits of music, the arts, and sport. He returned to the United Kingdom and from 1987 he became more widely known as the driving force behind the creation of that country's National Lottery. He was president of CAARE (Council for the Advancement of Arts, Recreation & Education), the charity he founded in 1996.

== Biography ==
Denis Edward Vaughan was born on 6 June 1926 in Melbourne, Australia. He graduated from University of Melbourne with a Bachelor of Music in 1947. He won a scholarship to study organ and double bass at England's Royal College of Music (1947–1950), under the tutelage of George Thalben-Ball and Eugene Cruft. In March and April 1949 he represented the Organ Music Society in performances at St Luke's Church, Chelsea. In October then-Princess Elizabeth of York (see Elizabeth II) presented Vaughan with the Tagore Gold Medal for general achievement during 1949. In March the following year he performed with George Malcolm for the Organ Music Society at King's College Chapel, University of London.

In 1950, he joined the Royal Philharmonic Orchestra (RPO) and went on tour to the United States with Thomas Beecham. By 1954 Vaughan was assistant conductor and chorus master of the RPO and formed the Beecham Choral Society. In the 1950s and early 1960s he participated in annual concerts featuring four harpsichordists, with Malcolm, Thurston Dart and fellow Australian, Eileen Joyce. In 1957 this group recorded two of Vivaldi's Concertos for Four Harpsichords, one in a Bach arrangement, with the Pro Arte Orchestra under Boris Ord. They also recorded Malcolm's Variations on a Theme of Mozart. The ensemble's works were issued in June 1958 by Angel Records for the US market. He followed with engagements at La Scala, Hamburg and Munich opera houses and a season at Bayreuth as assistant to Hans Knappertsbusch. In 1959, together with Klemperer, Celibidache, Bernstein and Maazel, Vaughan was invited to conduct one of the special concerts performed in Parma in honour of Arturo Toscanini. At that time he corresponded with Italian conductor Gianandrea Gavazzeni on the works of Giacomo Puccini and Giuseppe Verdi.

By 1966 he had moved to Rome and received wider acclaim by his recordings for RCA Victor. His discography with the Orchestra "Scarlatti" of Naples includes the complete symphonies of Schubert, twelve Haydn symphonies, other works by Schubert, Bach and Mozart, with eleven early symphonies and the opera Il re pastore (with Lucia Popp, Reri Grist, and Luigi Alva). In 1967 he provided his report, Facts and Opinions on Certain Practices Regarding Copyright in Musical Works, on behalf of the International Federation of Musicians, to the Berne Convention for the Protection of Literary and Artistic Works. From 1972 to 1980 he was in Germany as the director at the Munich State Opera House, before being appointed as musical director of the State Opera of South Australia in Adelaide (1981–84).

Vaughan moved back to London in 1987 and began a campaign to establish a National Lottery in the UK, with profits to increase access to culture and sport for young people, and improve their quality of life. Following his 1988 Sunday Telegraph article "Why not gamble on culture?", Ken Hargreaves MP presented an early day motion in the House of Commons in April 1989 calling for an Arts/Sports Lottery. It received 67 all-party signatures. Less than a year later, the Adam Smith Institute invited Vaughan to write a paper, "The Case for a National Arts Lottery". Articles were also featured in the House Magazine and The Times, and Vaughan delivered an address to the Confederation of British Industry (CBI) Sport and Leisure Conference. In January 1992, Vaughan advised Ivan Lawrence QC, who led a debate in the House of Commons, and a year later the Commons approved the lottery in a vote. Vaughan's campaign for a National Lottery brought a sevenfold increase in funds for the arts and sport. He was described by Denis Howell as "the man who brought more money to sport than anyone else in the 20th Century".

In 1990 Vaughan self-published the book, The Effect of Music on Body and Soul : How to Stay Young with Rock : How to Kick the Need for Drugs. In 1996 he founded the charity, Council for the Advancement of Arts, Recreation & Education (CAARE) to continue promoting the benefits of wider access to arts and sport, and to act as a monitor of the National Lottery's use of funds in these areas. As president of CAARE he directs the charity's work in seeking further improvements in the quality of life of young people in Britain.

In 2008 his work with CAARE was highly praised in The Times (17 April) ("Thank heavens for campaigners such as Denis Vaughan"). The fundamental changes which he aims to achieve with CAARE's help include priorities in Treasury in GB, so that the daily lives of the populace are based on physical, emotional, mental and spiritual education, in equal proportions.

The minimal effort put into providing facilities for and constant stimulation towards daily participation for all young people in physical and creative activities needs to be radically changed until a permanent programme is available, not at risk of being dropped as a result of bureaucratic or political whim.

Vaughan's indications of how the holistic aspects of behaviour include spiritual awareness at a high level are discussed at the highest levels, including Anthony Seldon at Wellington College and Matthew Taylor at the Royal Society of Arts.

Denis Vaughan was a world authority on the manuscript scores of Verdi, Puccini and Antonín Dvořák. In May 2005 he conducted the London Philharmonic Orchestra at the Royal Festival Hall.
