= Hamilton Harty Professor of Music =

The Hamilton Harty Professorship of Music was established by the Senate of Queen's University Belfast in 1951, and named after the composer Sir Hamilton Harty; his royalties would fund the chair.

== List of Hamilton Harty Professors of Music ==
- 1951–1954: Ivor Christopher Banfield Keys, CBE.
- 1954–1970: Philip Cranmer.
- 1970–1972: Raymond Henry Charles Warren.
- 1972–1984: David Clive Greer.
- 1985–1996: Adrian Tregerthen Thomas.
- 1996–2016?: Jan Albert Smaczny.
- 2024–2026: Ian Woodfield
