= Hervey Alan =

English operatic singer (1910–1982)

Hervey Alan OBE (22 February 1910 – 12 January 1982) was an English operatic bass and voice teacher. During his career he sang leading roles with most of Great Britain's major opera institutions, including the Edinburgh Festival, the Glyndebourne Festival, the Royal Opera House, the Sadler's Wells Opera, and the Welsh National Opera. He is best known for creating the role of Mr. Redburn in the world premiere of Benjamin Britten's Billy Budd at the Royal Opera House, London, on 1 December 1951. Music critic Elizabeth Forbes wrote that his voice was "dark toned, resonant", and "especially effective as Zaccaria in Nabucco.

After retiring from opera performance in 1963, Alan continued to appear as a concert singer up until his death. He also taught on the voice faculty at the Royal College of Music and worked as a lay vicar at Westminster Abbey.

== Early life and career ==
Born in Whitstable, Alan first studied engineering at Medway University Technical College before pursuing studies in vocal music in London with Percival Driver, Mabel Kelly, and celebrated baritone Roy Henderson. He made his professional debut singing live on BBC Radio in 1935. His initial singing career was spent performing as a concert singer and recitalist. Early performances in his career included George Frideric Handel's Utrecht Te Deum and Jubilate with the City of Birmingham Symphony Orchestra. During the war he toured with the pianist Ivey Dickson, performing for the forces. Composer Armstrong Gibbs notably created his art songs Chloris in the Snow and Amaryllis for him in 1949.

== Opera career ==
In 1947 Alan's career made a decided shift towards opera when he became a resident artist at the Sadler's Wells Opera where he remained through 1952. Among the roles he portrayed for Sadler's Wells were Alfio in Pietro Mascagni's Cavalleria rusticana, Cancion in Ermanno Wolf-Ferrari's I quatro rusteghi, Colline in Giacomo Puccini's La bohème, the Commendatore in Mozart's Don Giovanni, Don Basilio in Gioachino Rossini's The Barber of Seville, the Grand Inquisitor in Giuseppe Verdi's Don Carlos, Simone in Puccini's Gianni Schicchi, and Zuniga in Georges Bizet's Carmen among others.

From 1949 until 1960, Alan made several appearances at the Glyndebourne Festival Opera, including Alidoro in Rossini's La Cenerentola, Father Trulove in Igor Stravinsky's The Rake's Progress, Neptune in Mozart's Idomeneo, the oracle in Gluck's Alceste, Padre Guardiano in Verdi's La forza del destino, Pistol in Verdi's Falstaff, the Police Inspector in Der Rosenkavalier, and Tom in Verdi's Un ballo in maschera.

In 1950 Alan made his first appearance at The Proms as the bass soloist in Joseph Haydn's The Creation. He returned to The Proms as soloist over the next 12 years, singing in performances of Giuseppe Verdi's Aida (1954), Richard Wagner's Die Walküre (1955), Samuel Coleridge-Taylor's The Song of Hiawatha (1956), Wagner's The Flying Dutchman (1957), Maurice Johnstone's Dover Beach (1958), Ralph Vaughan Williams' A Sea Symphony (1959), and Hector Berlioz's La damnation de Faust (1962).

On 1 December 1951 Alan created the role of Mr. Redburn in the world premiere of Benjamin Britten's landmark work Billy Budd at the Royal Opera House, London. From 1952 until 1963 he performed frequently with the Welsh National Opera, including the roles of Federico Barbarossa in La battaglia di Legnano, Melchtal in William Tell, Méphistophélès in Faust, Procida in I vespri siciliani, Sparafucile in Rigoletto, and a much lauded portrayal of Zaccaria in Verdi's Nabucco.

In 1961 Alan portrayed the title role in Handel's Rinaldo for London's Handel Society. He repeated the role at the Berlin State Opera and the Handel Festival, Halle. One of his final opera appearances was as Farasmane in Handel's Radamisto in 1962 for the Handel Society.

== Later life and career ==
After retiring from opera performance in 1963, Alan worked as a lay vicar at Westminster Abbey and continued to appear as a concert singer up until his death. He was particularly admired in his latter years for his performances of the title role in Felix Mendelssohn's Elijah, a role which he portrayed more than 500 times in concert. He also taught on the voice faculty at the Royal College of Music where his pupils included soprano Janet Price and baritone Thomas Allen. In 1972 he was named a fellow of the Royal College of Music and was appointed OBE in the 1974 Birthday Honours. He died in Croydon, aged 71.

== Recordings ==
- Idomeneo, Glyndebourne Festival Chorus and Orchestra, John Pritchard (EMI, 1956)
- Music of Purcell, Philomusica of London, conducted by Sir Anthony Lewis (L'Oiseau-Lyre, 1958)
- King Arthur, St Anthony Singers, Philomusica of London, conducted by Sir Anthony Lewis (Decca, 1958)
- On Christmas Night, Choir of King's College, Cambridge, London Symphony Orchestra, David Willcocks (Argo Records, 1962)
