= Edward Joseph Dent =

English musicologist (1876–1957)

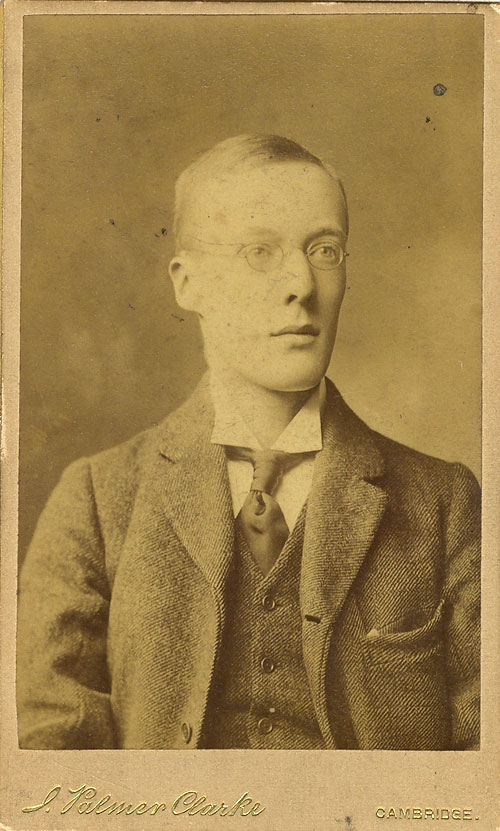
Dent at King's College, Cambridge, 1900

Edward Joseph Dent FBA (16 July 1876 – 22 August 1957), generally known as Edward J. Dent, was an English musicologist, teacher, translator and critic. A leading figure of musicology and music criticism, Dent was Professor of Music at the University of Cambridge between 1926 and 1941.

== Life ==
Dent was born in Ribston, Yorkshire, the son of the landowner and politician John Dent. He was educated at Bilston Grange, and Eton where he was a music student of Charles Harford Lloyd. He matriculated at King's College, Cambridge in 1895, graduating B.A. in 1898 in the Classical Tripos, Mus.B. 1899 having studied under Charles Wood and Charles Villiers Stanford, and M.A. 1902. He was elected a Fellow of his college in March 1902 having distinguished himself in music both as researcher and a composer.

Dent was Professor of Music at Cambridge University from 1926 to 1941, where his students included Arthur Bliss, Arnold Cooke and Cecil Armstrong Gibbs. He was President of the International Society for Contemporary Music (I.S.C.M.) from its foundation in 1922 until 1938 and again between 1945 and 1947. He was a governor of Sadler's Wells Opera, and translated many libretti for it. He wrote influential books on Alessandro Scarlatti, Ferruccio Busoni, Handel, English operas and the operas of Mozart.

Dent died in London, aged 81.

== Legacy ==
The music writer and critic Arthur Jacobs commended Dent's opera translations, which "at their best, whether in colloquial or lofty style (The Barber of Seville, The Trojans), reduce me to despair at nearly all later translators' efforts, including my own". Dent "saw opera as a people's possession. Totally pro-opera-in-English, totally pro-theatrical, anti-snob and indifferent to stars, he wrote: 'The more I frequent opera, the more keenly I am interested in the work itself and its presentation as a whole, and the more indifferent I am to its individual parts'."

The character Philip Herriton in E. M. Forster's novel Where Angels Fear to Tread (1905) was based on Dent.

The tenor Clive Carey was another friend, and the two exchanged over 400 letters over many years. The "informal biography" Duet for Two Voices by Hugh Carey was published in 1979, based on the letters. A new biography by Karen Arrandale was published in January 2023.

== Selected publications ==
- Alessandro Scarlatti, his life and works, 1905.
- Mozart's operas, 1913.
- Foundations of English opera, 1928.
- Ferruccio Busoni, 1933.
- A life of Handel, 1936.
- Opera. Penguin, 1940.

== Sources ==
- Arrundale, Karen (2023). Edward J Dent: A Life in Words and Music. Boydell Press. ISBN 978-1-783-27205-1.
- Arrundale, Karen (2018). 'The Scholar as Critic: Edward J Dent', in British Musical Criticism and Intellectual Thought, 1850-1950. Boydell Press. ISBN 978-1-783-27287-7.
- Hugh Carey; Edward Joseph Dent; Clive Carey (1979). Duet for Two Voices: An Informal Biography of Edward Dent Compiled from His Letters to Clive Carey. Cambridge University Press. ISBN 978-0-521-22312-6.
- Lewis, Anthony; Fortune, Nigel (2001). "Dent, Edward J(oseph)". Grove Music Online. Oxford: Oxford University Press. doi:10.1093/gmo/9781561592630.article.07574. ISBN 978-1-56159-263-0. (subscription, Wikilibrary access, or UK public library membership required)
- Radcliffe, Philip (1976). E.J. Dent: A centenary memoir. Triad Press.
