= Man and Music Series =

The Man and Music series of eight books was written in conjunction with the television series of the same name, broadcast by Granada Television International and Channel 4 from the mid 1980s. It has been called "the first even remotely comprehensive, social history of Western art-music." In the American edition the series was called Music and Society. The studies in it tried to develop the social context of classical music beyond the issue of patronage, as far as British music was concerned.

== Contents ==
The series editor was Stanley Sadie. The programmes examined the development of music in particular places and periods in the history of Western Civilisation between Antiquity and the end of the 20th Century. As well as Continental Europe, music in Spain, Scandinavia, Russia and the Americas is discussed. The series is not a history of music as such but discusses the context in which music flourished — social, cultural and intellectual. The books are aimed at the general reader, and the Preface in each volume states — 'We want to explain not what happened, but why it happened, and why it happened when and where it did'. The series was published in England by The Granada Group and The Macmillan Press Ltd. The American edition, with the title Music and Society, was published by Prentice Hall.

Each volume comprises an introductory essay by that volume's editor, and a series of chapters by different specialists of the musical life of specific localities. Each of the 111 chapters has footnotes, and a section of bibliographical notes for further reading. Each book includes a comprehensive Chronology, with events listed under Music & Musicians; Politics, War & Rulers; Literature, Philosophy & Religion; Science, Technology, & Discovery; Fine & Decorative Arts, Architecture. The books are illustrated by an ample selection of black and white images, including maps.

The books in the series are:

1. Antiquity and the Middle Ages: from Ancient Greece to the 15th century. Edited by James McKinnon, 1990, x + 337pp (ISBN 978-0130361615)
2. The Renaissance: from the 1470s to the end of the 16th century. Edited by Iain Fenlon, 1989, x + 418pp (ISBN 978-0333526521)
3. The Early Baroque Era: from the late 16th century to the 1660s. Edited by Curtis Price, 1993, xiii + 399pp (ISBN 978-0132237932)
4. The Late Baroque Era: from the 1680s to 1740. Edited by George J. Buelow, 1993, xii + 521pp (ISBN 978-0135299838)
5. The Classical Era: from the 1740s to the end of the 18th century. Edited by Neal Zaslaw, 1989, x + 416pp (ISBN 978-0131369382)
6. The Early Romantic Era: Between Revolutions, 1789 and 1848. Edited by Alexander Ringer, 1993, x + 325pp (ISBN 978-0132223324)
7. The Late Romantic Era: from the Mid-19th Century to World War 1. Edited by Jim Sampson, 1993 x + 463pp (ISBN 978-0135241820)
8. Modern Times: from World War 1 to the Present. Edited by Robert P. Morgan, 1993, x + 464pp (ISBN 978-0135901595)
