= Nigel Fortune =

English musicologist and political activist

- Born: Nigel Cameron Fortune; 5 December 1924; Northumberland, England, United Kingdom
- Died: 10 April 2009 (aged 84); Birmingham, England, United Kingdom
- Occupations: Musicologist, political activist

Nigel Cameron Fortune (5 December 1924 – 10 April 2009) was an English musicologist and political activist. Along with Thurston Dart, Oliver Neighbour and Stanley Sadie he was one of Britain's leading musicologists of the post-World War II generation. He played an instrumental part in improving professional musicological standards in England through research initiatives, conferences and scholarly publications. This greatly increased his country's international reputation in the field of music scholarship.

Fortune's speciality in musicological research was in 17th-century Italian music and on the lives and works of George Friederich Handel and Henry Purcell. He contributed articles to several encyclopaedias and was notably one of the senior editors of The New Grove Dictionary of Music and Musicians. He also contributed writings or served as an editor to numerous music publications and books. For many years he was the co-editor of the journal Music & Letters.

== Life and career ==
Born in Northumberland, Fortune was the son of an insurance salesman. An only child, he moved with his parents at the age of 10 to the Handsworth, West Midlands area of Birmingham. He lived in the same house there for his entire life; notably living next door to the mother of British Labour Party MP Clare Short. He served as Short's agent during most of her time as an MP and was also highly active in the education system in Birmingham; serving for many years as a chairman of school governors.

After receiving his childhood education at the Handsworth Grammar School, Fortune attended the University of Birmingham from 1947 to 1950 where he earned degrees in music and the Italian language. He went on to earn a PhD from the University of Cambridge in 1954; becoming the second person to be awarded a doctorate for music in the history of the United Kingdom. His doctoral thesis on the development of monody in Italy was overseen by Thurston Dart. With Dart he later edited John Dowland's Ayres for Four Voices (1953–63). One of his other important mentors at Cambridge was Professor Sir Anthony Lewis, then honorary secretary of the Purcell Society and a co-founder of the Musica Britannica. With Lewis he worked on The Works of Henry Purcell, "which played a significant role in establishing the position of the major English composer".

From 1956 to 1959 Fortune served as music librarian at Senate House of the University of London. He left there to become a lecturer at the University of Birmingham in autumn 1959. He remained there until his retirement in 1985; at which point he had been working there as a reader. From 1957 to 1971 he was the Royal Musical Association's secretary and later served as the organisation's vice-president; posts through which he encouraged many young music scholars. During the 1970s and 1980s he worked under Stanley Sadie as one of the senior editors and as a writer for The New Grove Dictionary of Music and Musicians (1980, 1st edition). From 1980 to 2008 he served as co-editor of the journal Music & Letters.

In the 1960s Fortune and musicologist Denis Arnold founded an important annual conference for graduate students in music in England which established for the first time in that country a community for music scholarship. With Arnold he also collaborated on The Monteverdi Companion (1968, enlarged and reissued as The New Monteverdi Companion, 1985) and The Beethoven Companion (1971). He collaborated on several other publications with a variety of scholars, mostly as an editor, including a collection of essays in honour of Winton Dean in 1987. He contributed several articles to Musica Britannica from 1975 to 1977 and to the New Oxford History of Music in 1985. While his scholarly work tended to focus on early music, he was a champion of the music of contemporary composer John Casken and for many years provided significant financial support to the Birmingham Contemporary Music Group. He died in Birmingham at the age of 84 having never married.
