= Angus Morrison (pianist) =

English pianist and teacher

Stuart Angus Morrison CBE (28 May 1902 – 23 January 1989) was an English pianist and teacher who played a significant role in the revival of British music during the inter-war years.

== Early career and friendships ==
Angus Morrison was born in Bray, near Maidenhead, Berkshire into a musical family, and began playing piano at the age of four. At nine years old he began lessons with Harold Samuel. By 13 he was playing for Margaret Morris's dancing classes in Chelsea. At the age of 16 he was admitted to the Royal College of Music through an open scholarship. His composition teachers there were Thomas Dunhill and Ralph Vaughan Williams, and his contemporaries included Constant Lambert, with whom he enjoyed a lifelong friendship. While at the college, Morrison helped Lambert with the scenario for his early ballet Adam and Eve. He was the dedicatee of Lambert's The Rio Grande, and played the solo piano part in the first broadcast performance on 27 February 1928 from the BBC's Savoy Hill Studios.

Through Lambert, Morrison also became a close friend of William Walton, and offered help and advice to Walton while he was struggling with the composition of his Viola Concerto and First Symphony.

== Pianist ==
Angus Morrison lived at 9, Oakley Street in Chelsea. He made his London debut as a pianist in 1923 at the RCM, playing two pieces by Albéniz and the F minor sonata, Op. 5 by Brahms, and made his Proms debut in 1927. In 1926 he began teaching at the Royal College, carrying on for over 45 years until his retirement in 1975. From the mid-1930s he also played in a trio with violinist Jean Pougnet and cellist Anthony Pini. He was a champion of French and English music in particular, playing John Ireland's Piano Concerto several times, including at the Proms in 1933. Morrison left no recordings.

== Teacher ==
At the Royal College his pupils included Armand D'Angour, Ruth Dyson, Colin Horsley, John Lill, Alan Rowlands, Melvyn Tan, Katherine Storr and Julius Drake. He was pianist for the Ballet Rambert from 1931 to 1941, and was music director there between 1940 and 41. He was also an occasional actor, appearing (approximately 36 minutes in) as the pianist in the 1940 film Gaslight. Morrison was appointed a Commander of the Order of the British Empire (CBE) in 1979.

To mark his 80th birthday a concert was held at the Royal College of Music on 27 May 1982, with Morrison once again performing the solo part of The Rio Grande, soloist Mary Hart and the RCM chorus and orchestra conducted by Sir David Willcocks.
