= Piano Lesson (TV series) =

1950 British TV instructional series

Piano Lesson is a British television series which aired on the BBC during 1950. It was hosted by the pianist, teacher and broadcaster Sidney Harrison. The first series was aimed at beginners, while the second series intermediate students. Harrison also gave piano lessons on other programmes during the 1950s, including the BBC's children's session.

The series is likely lost, as very few telerecordings exist of BBC television from before 1953.

== See also ==
- How to Play the Piano
