= Brian Trowell =

English musicologist (1931–2015)

- Born: 21 February 1931; Wokingham, Berkshire, England
- Died: 12 November 2015 (aged 84)
- Occupation: Musicologist

Academic background
- Education: Professor
- Alma mater: University of Cambridge

Brian Lewis Trowell (21 February 1931 – 12 November 2015) was an English musicologist and the Heather Professor of Music at the University of Oxford. Prior to his post at Oxford, he was the King Edward Professor of Music at King's College London. In the mid-1980s, he served as president of the Royal Musical Association.

== Education ==
Brian Trowell was born in Wokingham in 1931. He received his BA from the University of Cambridge in 1953, and a doctorate there in 1960, under Thurston Dart.

== Career ==
Trowell taught at Birmingham University from 1957 to 1962, at King's College London in 1964–64, was Director of Opera at the Guildhall School of Music and Drama in 1963–67, became the Gresham Professor of Music, and from 1967 to 1970 was the Head of Radio Opera at the BBC. He returned to King's College in 1970 and was the King Edward VII Professor of Music there from 1974 to 1988. When Denis Arnold, the Heather Professor of Music at Oxford (1974–1986) died in 1986, Trowell eventually succeeded him and took the Heather Professor chair at Oxford in 1988.

His scholarship focussed on Edward Elgar, among other composers.

Trowell served as president of the Royal Musical Association 1984 to 1989.

He died in Oxford in 2015.

== Selected publications ==
- Trowell, Brian Lewis (1993). "Elgar's Use of Literature". In Monk, Raymond (ed.). Edward Elgar: Music and Literature. Aldershot, Hants, England: Scolar Press. pp. 182–326. ISBN 0-85967-937-3. OCLC 29955265.
- Trowell, Brian (1959). "Faburden and Fauxbourdon". Musica Disciplina. 13: 43–78. JSTOR 20531911.
