= CAARE =

UK charity

CAARE (Council for the Advancement of Arts, Recreation & Education) is a charity founded in 1996 by Denis Vaughan, the founding father of the National Lottery in Britain. CAARE is committed to improving access to grassroots sport and culture for every young person in the United Kingdom.

== Reason for creation ==
The original vision of the National Lottery has, in the opinion of the founders of CAARE, now been set aside as the Lottery becomes a political tool for ministers and bureaucrats. CAARE is the only charity to fully monitor Lottery spending on good causes: they are the only organisation outside government to receive monthly figures of the National Lottery Distribution Fund (NLDF), including the surplus totals, which CAARE considers scandalous. Currently, approximately £2.3 billion is sitting idly in a Lottery bank account. CAARE regularly briefs press and politicians on the state of the Lottery and its finances. Both the Public Accounts Committee in 2005 and the National Audit Office in 2004 agreed that the surplus is unacceptable and must be reduced.

CAARE for Sport is the campaign to give sport the prominence it deserves in the UK. In 2001 and 2004, 41 famous names in British sport backed CAARE's calls for a substantial increase in funding for sport through the Lottery and the Government, and for a restructuring of the way in which sport and culture are managed. CAARE went to 10 Downing Street to present a petition to the Prime Minister opposing the Government's plans for sport and the Lottery. The number of signatures on the petition was more than double the number who had responded positively to the consultation announced by the Government in Parliament.

CAARE has published several reports to demonstrate the importance of Lottery's original cause; Funding Physical Activity and the Arts by Benjamin Matthews (October 2007), Hurdles to Participation by James Warwick (October 2006), Arts Participation in Europe, by James Evans (October 2006), Some Economic & Social Costs of Physical Inactivity by Mike Collins and Christophe Borgus (July, 2009).

Articles about CAARE and Denis Vaughan have been regularly published in a number of news media and publications, including ITV News, The Times, The Daily Mail, The Scotsman and Time Out magazine.

== Contributions ==
CAARE has contributed to:

- House of Commons Standing Committee A (National Lottery Bill 2005)
- Independent Sports Review, 2005
- House of Commons Culture, Media & Sport Select Committee, 2004
