= King Edward Professor of Music =

The King Edward Professorship of Music was established at the University of London in 1902 with an endowment of £5,000 from Trinity College of Music. King Edward VII granted permission for his name to be associated with the professorship. Since at least Thurston Dart's time in the chair (1964–71), it has been based at King's College London.

== List of King Edward Professors of Music ==
- 1902–1924: Sir Frederick Bridge.
- 1925–1937: Sir Percy Carter Buck.
- 1937–1948: Sir Stanley Marchant, CVO.
- 1950–1964: Herbert Norman Howells, CH, CBE.
- 1964–1971: Robert Thurston Dart.
- 1972–1974: Howard Mayer Brown.
- 1974–1988: Brian Lewis Trowell.
- 1988–1995: Sir Curtis Alexander Price, KBE.
- 1996–2013: John William Deathridge.
- 2013–present: Martin Stokes, FBA.
