= James Rossiter Hoyle Professor of Music =

The James Rossiter Hoyle Professorship of Music at the University of Sheffield was established in 1927 and endowed with £16,000 by the will of Augusta Rossiter Hoyle in memory of her late husband, James (died 1926), a manufacturer of steel armour-piercing shells who had been president of the Sheffield Musical Union and a master cutler.

== List ==
- 1928–1948: Frank Henry Shera
- 1948–1968: James Stewart Deas
- 1968–1974: Samuel Basil Deane
- 1975–1993: Edward James Clarke Garden
- 1993–2007: Eric Fillenz Clarke, FBA
- 2008–present: Simon Patrick Keefe
