= Ivey Dickson =

English pianist, teacher and musical director (1919–2014)

Ivey Dickson OBE (1 November 1919 – 8 November 2014) was an English pianist, music examiner and the second musical director of the National Youth Orchestra of Great Britain from 1966 until 1984.

== Early life ==
Dickson was born in Filton, Bristol, and started playing piano at the age of three. By 14 she had won over 200 prizes at festivals across the country. Through winning the Liszt Scholarship she studied at the Royal Academy of Music.

== Career ==
In 1938 Dickson appeared at Queen's Hall as soloist in the Emperor Concerto with Sir Henry Wood conducting, leading to five appearances at the Proms, including a performance of Alexander Mackenzie's Scottish Concerto at the Last Night in 1943 when she was still only 23. Her first solo recital was given at the Wigmore Hall in June 1940. During the war she gave recitals at the National Gallery and toured the country with a series of lecture recitals for the forces with baritone Hervey Alan.

After the war Dickson became a music teacher at Clifton High School in Bristol, and later at St Felix School, Southwold. In 1960 she joined the staff of the Royal Academy of Music and became an examiner for the Associated Board of the Royal Schools of Music, travelling internationally. As an accompanist she performed with Dennis Brain, Léon Goossens, Frederick Thurston and others. She married Jack Stoddart in 1962.

Dickson first became involved with the National Youth Orchestra from its inception in 1948 as a woodwind coach. In 1966 she took on the role of musical director, following on from its founder and her friend, Dame Ruth Railton. She auditioned candidates for the orchestra around the country and emphasized the training function of the orchestra, moving players gradually up the orchestral ranks until they were ready to take on more demanding soloist roles. She broadened the repertoire to cover the 20th Century, including performances of Stravinsky, Bartok and Shostakovich.

== Personal life ==
By the end of the 1960s Dickson was living at 40, Avondale Avenue, Worcester Park in Surrey. She was appointed OBE in 1979. She retired from the orchestra in 1984 and was succeeded by Derek Bourgeois. Her husband died in 1990. Dickson died in Surrey in November 2014 at the age of 95.
