= Martin Stokes =

British ethnomusicologist

Martin Stokes is a British ethnomusicologist and King Edward Professor of Music at the King's College London. He has special research interests in ethnomusicology and anthropology, as well as Middle Eastern popular music.

Stokes obtained his DPhil (PhD) from the University of Oxford (1989). He currently studies music and music theory with a particular emphasis on the contemporary Middle East. He returned to Oxford in 2007, having been at the University of Chicago, where he achieved the rank of associate professor of ethnomusicology in the Department of Music, since 1997 and previously at Queen's University Belfast in Northern Ireland. He served as the administrative director of the Middle East Ensemble, Javanese Gamelan and the World Music Concert series during his tenure at the University of Chicago. He also filled the role of Director of the Center for Middle Eastern Studies at the University of Chicago from 2003 to 2007.

== Published works ==
- The Republic of Love: Cultural Intimacy in Turkish Popular Music (University of Chicago Press 2010).
- The Arabesk Debate: Music and Musicians in Modern Turkey (1992).
- Ethnicity, Identity and Music: The Musical Construction of Place (1997) editor.
- Nationalism, Minorities and Diasporas: Identities and Rights in the Middle East (1996) co-editor.
- "Music and the Global Order" (2004)
- "Musical Cosmopolitanism" (2007).
