= Edward Garden =

British musicologist and academic

Edward James Clarke Garden (1930 – 23 September 2017), commonly known as Teddy Garden, was a British musicologist and academic. In 1969, he received a PhD from the University of Edinburgh for his thesis on "Mily Alexeyevich Balakirev". He was James Rossiter Hoyle Professor of Music (and Head of the Department of Music) at the University of Sheffield between 1975 and 1993. He was part of the music staff at Clifton College between 1954 and 1957, and then director of music at Loretto School until 1966, when he was appointed senior lecturer in music at the University of Glasgow. His time at Sheffield was marked by the university's difficulties in the early 1980s, but Garden went on to oversee a period of expansion in terms of student numbers and staff, and the introduction of new PhD programmes and concerts. In retirement, he was an emeritus professor at Sheffield.

== Selected publications ==
- Balakirev: A Critical Study of his Life and Music (Faber, 1967).
- Tchaikovsky (Dent, 1973).

Academic offices
Preceded by Basil Deane	James Rossiter Hoyle Professor of Music, University of Sheffield; 1975–1993	Succeeded by Eric Clarke
