= Stanley Sadie =

British musicologist (1930–2005)

Stanley John Sadie CBE (/ˈseɪdi/; 30 October 1930 – 21 March 2005) was a British musicologist, music critic, and editor. He was editor of the sixth edition of the Grove Dictionary of Music and Musicians (1980), which was published as the first edition of The New Grove Dictionary of Music and Musicians. Along with Thurston Dart, Nigel Fortune and Oliver Neighbour he was one of Britain's leading musicologists of the post-World War II generation.

== Career ==
Born in Wembley, Sadie was educated at St Paul's School, London, and studied music privately for three years with Bernard Stevens. At Gonville and Caius College, Cambridge he read music under Thurston Dart. Sadie earned Bachelor of Arts and Bachelor of Music degrees in 1953, a Master of Arts degree in 1957, and a PhD in 1958. His doctoral dissertation was on mid-eighteenth-century British chamber music. After Cambridge, he taught at Trinity College of Music, London (1957–1965).

Sadie then turned to music journalism, becoming music critic for The Times (1964–1981), and contributing reviews to the Financial Times after 1981, when he had to leave his position and The Times because of his commitments to the Grove and other scholarly work. He was editor of The Musical Times from 1967 until 1987.

From 1970, Sadie was editor of what was planned to be the sixth edition of the Grove Dictionary of Music and Musicians (1980). Sadie oversaw major changes to the dictionary, which grew from nine volumes to twenty, and was published as The New Grove Dictionary of Music and Musicians (New Grove), and is now referred to as the first edition under that name. He was also an important force behind the second edition of New Grove (2001), which grew further to 29 volumes. Sadie also oversaw a major expansion of the Grove franchise, editing the one-volume Grove Concise Dictionary of Music (1988), and several spinoff dictionaries, such as the New Grove Dictionary of Musical Instruments (three volumes, 1984), the New Grove Dictionary of American Music, (with H. Wiley Hitchcock, four volumes, 1986), and The New Grove Dictionary of Opera (four volumes, 1992). He also edited composer biographies based on the entries in Grove.

One of Sadie's largest publications, Mozart: The Early Years, published posthumously in 2006, was intended to be the first volume of a large biography of Wolfgang Amadeus Mozart. With the popularity of his now-separately published essay on the composer from the Grove Dictionary, Sadie had expressed his wishes to write a 'big book' about Mozart's life to his colleague Neal Zaslaw, who contributed to the final publication of the book with a foreword.

Outside his work on the Grove dictionaries, Sadie edited the Man and Music volumes accompanying a television series (1989–1993). He was also an accomplished bassoonist.

Sadie died at his home in Cossington, Somerset, on 21 March 2005, of amyotrophic lateral sclerosis (Motor Neurone disease), which had been diagnosed only a few weeks earlier.

Sadie married twice. His first wife, Adèle Sadie (née Bloom; 1931–1978) – whom he married in 1953 in London, and with whom he had two sons and a daughter – died in 1978. Sadie married Julie Anne Sadie (née Vertrees; born 1948), also a musicologist, in 1978. They had a son and a daughter.

== Honours ==
In the 1982 Birthday Honours, Sadie was appointed a Commander of the Order of the British Empire (CBE). He received an honorary Doctor of Letters from the University of Leicester in 1982, and was elected honorary fellow of the Royal College of Music in 1994 and Gonville and Caius College, Cambridge. In 2005, Sadie became a Handel Prize laureate.

== Professional affiliations ==
- American Musicological Society, corresponding member, 1996
- Royal Musical Association, president 1989–1984
- The Critics' Circle
- International Musicological Society, president 1992–1997

== Sources ==
- Stanley Sadie Archive Project, Cambridge University Library.
