= Basil Allchin =

British organist and academic (1878–1957)

Basil Charles Allchin (16 April 1878 – 1957) was an English organist, teacher and music examiner. Born at 47 Broad Street in Oxford (now demolished), he was the son of William Thomas Howell Allchin (1843–1883), who was organist at St John's College, Oxford and conductor of the Oxford Choral Society for 16 years until his early death, aged 39.

== Career ==
Basil Allchin attended Christ's Hospital School in London and went on to study at Oxford as a non-collegiate student, where he was awarded Bachelor of Arts in 1898. From 1902 he studied music at the Royal College of Music with Walter Parratt (organ), Herbert Sharpe (piano) and Walford Davies and Stanford (composition).

He became Assistant Organist at Christ Church, Oxford under Basil Harwood, and from 1905 for 20 years was the organist at Hertford College. By the 1920s he was teaching music at Exeter College, Oxford, and from 1929 until the mid-1930s was Director of Music, Cheltenham Ladies' College. Between 1920 and 1947 he also taught at the Royal College of Music, where he was Registrar from 1935 to 1939, appointed by Hugh Allen. Allchin was also an Examiner for the Associated Board of the Royal School of Music, and (with Ernest Read) the author of A Book of Aural Tests (1936). Among his many pupils were Barbara Cass-Beggs, conductor and organist Guy Harrison (1894-1986), Robert Still and William Walton.

Allchin married his wife Mary Robinson in 1907. Their addresses in Oxford included 18 Turl Street (early 1930s) and The Thatched Cottage, North Hinksey (from 1935). Mary died there in January 1946, and Allchin married again in 1947 to Margaret Joyce Davis. He died in Wells, Somerset at the age of 78, survived by his twin sister Gwladys Marguerite Allchin (1878-1972).
