= Simon P. Keefe =

English musocologist

- Born: 24 December 1968 (age 57); Leicester, UK
- Citizenship: British
- Occupations: Musicologist, author
- Employer: University of Sheffield

Simon Patrick Keefe (born December 24, 1968) is an English musicologist, author, and Mozart expert. Born in Leicester, he was educated at the University of Cambridge, Boston University and Columbia University. After being awarded his PhD at Columbia in 1997, he was appointed to a lectureship at Christ Church, Oxford, and then lectured at Queen's University Belfast in 1999. In 2003, he took up a post at City, University of London, where he became a professor of music. In 2008, he was appointed to the James Rossiter Hoyle Chair of Music at the University of Sheffield. As of 2024, Keefe is also serving a three-year term as president of the Royal Musical Association.

Keefe specialises in Mozart, and is the only British member of the Salzburg-based Akademie für Mozart-Forschung of the Internationale Stiftung Mozarteum, as of 2005. Keefe has also written on other composers such as Haydn and Beethoven, and has also studied Wagner, the concerto, and 20th-century French popular song.

Keefe is a life-long fan of Aston Villa F.C.

== Work and publications ==
=== Books ===
- Mozart's Piano Concertos: Dramatic Dialogue in the Age of Enlightenment (2001)
- Mozart's Viennese Instrumental Music: A Study of Stylistic Re-Invention (2007)
- Mozart's Requiem: Reception, Work, Completion (2012)
- Mozart in Vienna: The Final Decade (2017)

=== Edited books ===
- The Cambridge Companion to Mozart (2003)
- The Cambridge Companion to the Concerto (2005)
- The Cambridge Mozart Encyclopedia (2006)
- Mozart Studies (2006)
- The Cambridge History of Eighteenth-Century Music (2009)
- Mozart Studies 2 (2015)
- Mozart (2015)
- Mozart in Context (2018)

=== Media engagement ===
Keefe has appeared in BBC Two's film, Mozart in Prague: Rolando Villázon on Don Giovanni (2014), for which he was principal musicological consultant. He has also appeared as a contributor to two BBC Two Newsnight films (2007, 2008) and Deutsche Welle's In Mozart's Footsteps: London (2006), alongside various radio appearances.

Keefe has appeared on the website HistoFlick, in an article about the film, Amadeus (1984) on the reception and life of Mozart.

== Awards ==
The Mozart Society of America awarded Keefe's 2012 monograph Mozart's Requiem: Reception Work and Completion the Marjorie Weston Emerson Award in 2013, for the best book or edition published in 2011 or 2012.

Mozart in Context was named one of the "best classical music book releases of 2019" by the BBC Music Magazine, and received an "Outstanding Academic Title" award from the magazine Choice (American Library Association).

== See also ==
- Stefano Mandini -- for an insight into how Mozart collaborated with his singers in writing his operas
