= John Lill =

British pianist

John Richard Lill CBE (born 17 March 1944 in London) is a British classical pianist.

== Biography ==
Lill studied at the Royal College of Music with Angus Morrison, and with Wilhelm Kempff. His talent emerged at an early age, he gave his first piano recital at the age of nine and by the age of 14 had all of the Piano Sonatas of Beethoven committed to memory. At age 18, he performed Rachmaninoff's 3rd Piano Concerto under Sir Adrian Boult followed then by a much-acclaimed 1963 London debut playing Ludwig van Beethoven's Piano Concerto No. 5 at the Royal Festival Hall. In 1970 he won the Moscow International Tchaikovsky Competition (ex-aequo with Vladimir Krainev). It was said by Sidney Harrison that "he (John Lill) simply devours Beethoven. I set him work for the week – he does that and more."

Lill has made a number of recordings, including the complete piano concertos of Beethoven, Brahms and Rachmaninoff and the complete piano sonatas of Beethoven and Prokofiev.

Lill has performed in over fifty countries, both as a recitalist and as a concerto soloist. He has worked in the major European concert cities, including Amsterdam, Berlin, Paris, Prague, Rome, Stockholm and Vienna, as well as in Russia, the Far East and Australasia (including several Australian Broadcasting Corporation tours). He has also performed in the United States with the Symphony Orchestras of Cleveland, New York, Philadelphia, Dallas, Seattle, Baltimore, Boston, Washington, D.C., and San Diego.

His repertoire includes more than seventy concertos, and he is acclaimed in particular as a leading interpreter of Beethoven, whose complete sonata cycle he has performed on several occasions in the UK, US and Japan. In Britain, he has given over 30 BBC Promenade concerts and regularly appears with all the major symphony orchestras. He has toured overseas with the London Symphony, London Philharmonic, BBC Symphony, CBSO, Hallé, Royal Scottish National and BBC Scottish Symphony Orchestras.

Lill has recorded for Deutsche Grammophon, EMI (Complete Beethoven Piano Concertos with RSNO and Alexander Gibson), ASV (both Brahms Concertos with the Hallé and James Loughran), Tchaikovsky l with the LSO and James Judd, plus the complete Beethoven Sonatas. More recently, he has recorded the complete Prokofiev sonatas with ASV and his recording of the complete Beethoven Bagatelles and Piano Concertos with the CBSO and Walter Weller is available on Chandos. He recorded Malcolm Arnold's Fantasy on a Theme of John Field (dedicated to John Lill) with the Royal Philharmonic Orchestra and Vernon Handley for Conifer. He has also recorded the complete Rachmaninoff concertos and major solo piano works for Nimbus Records. His most recent recording projects have been the 60th birthday release of piano works by Schumann on the Classics for Pleasure label and new releases for Signum records of Schumann, Brahms and Haydn.

In 2000, Lill suffered injuries to both his hands when muggers slashed his hands in the course of a robbery attempt. He recovered quickly and resumed his career.

John Lill lives in London. He was appointed an Officer of the Order of the British Empire (OBE) in 1978 and appointed a CBE for his services to music in the 2005 New Year's Honours List.
