= Isolde Menges =

British violinist (1893–1976)

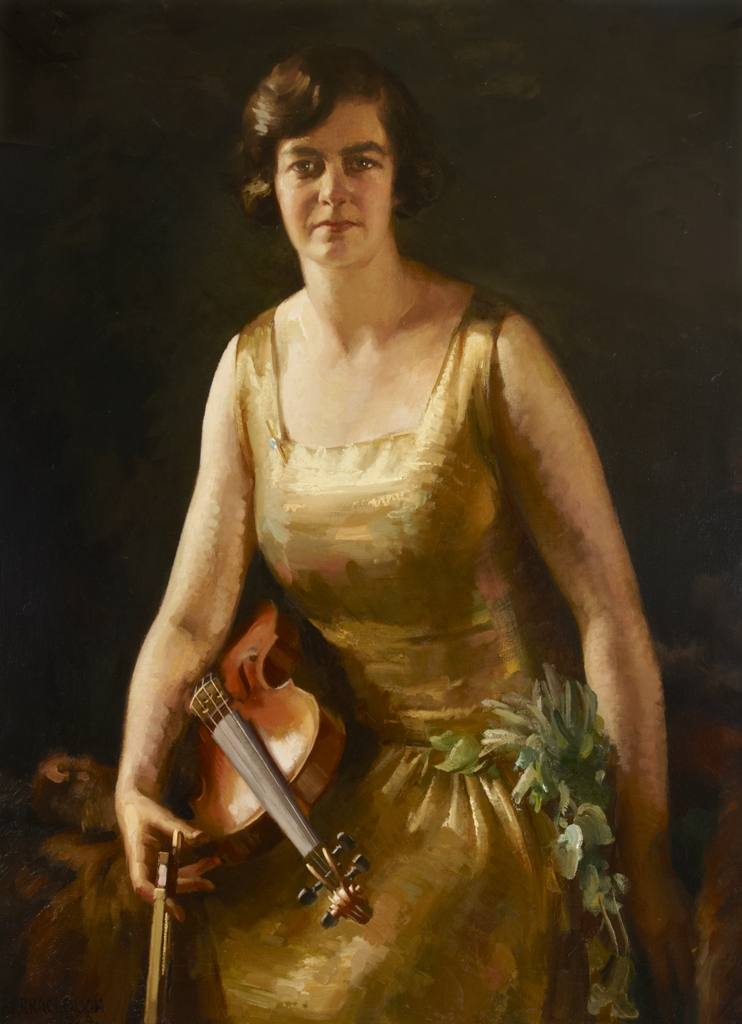
- Painting by James P. Barraclough, 1929

Background information
- Born: 16 May 1893
- Died: 13 January 1976 (aged 82)
- Genres: classical
- Instrument: violin
- Formerly of: Menges Quartet

Isolde Marie Menges (16 May 1893 – 13 January 1976) was a celebrated English violinist most active in the first part of the 20th century.

== Life ==
The daughter of George Menges, a native of Germany, she was born in Sussex, England. Her parents both played the violin and operated a music school. Menges became a student of Leopold Auer and Carl Flesch. She concertised widely, as soloist and with the Menges Quartet (founded by her in 1931) and Quintet, in locations such as Darmstadt (at 14 years of age), Liège, Wiesbaden, Amsterdam, The Hague, Rotterdam, and throughout England, Scotland, Canada and the United States.

Her Quartet gave a complete cycle of Beethoven quartets in Wigmore Hall in London in 1938, and another in Oxford.

She gave concerti with noted orchestras and conductors such as the New Queen's Hall Orchestra conducted by Henry J. Wood, and London Symphony Orchestra conducted by Bruno Walter, and the Royal Philharmonic Society. In 1916 she played the Brahms Violin Concerto and Édouard Lalo's Symphonie espagnole with Ernest Bloch.

During World War I, because her German heritage brought her loyalty into question in England, Menges toured North America from 1916 to 1919. She gave more than 100 free concerts for children in Canada.

In 1920, she married the composer Harold Tod Boyd; the couple had one child.

In 1923, she recorded Beethoven's violin concerto for His Master's Voice with Landon Ronald conducting the Royal Albert Hall Orchestra, which is the first known recording of this work.

A major prize commemorates her at the Royal College of Music, where she taught from 1931.

Her younger brother was the composer and conductor (Siegfried Frederick) Herbert Menges.

== Press notices ==
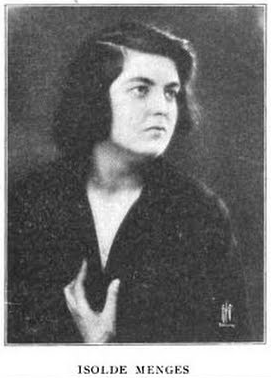
Isolde Menges, from a 1921 publication.

Menges generated considerable acclaim. For instance, the New York Times in 1917 called her "first rate".

More specifically, notices included the following:

February 1913: Queen's Hall, Tchaikovsky V concerto: "...remarkable command of the bow and ... almost childish delight in displaying her mastery. Sometimes the conductor had to restrain her when she was on the point of making off with a passage at breakneck speed, and her phrasing was of the impulse kind which makes such frankly bravura music as this entertaining... [H]er tone was extraordinarily pure and her style clean and crisp... [In a Chopin nocturne] great beauty of cantabile quality, but she missed some of the daintiness of Kreisler's "Schoen Rosmarin" by taking it too fast" And in this piece in April 1913: "... clean double-stopping, and ... brilliant manipulation of exacting passages... She.. succeeded in making the listener take a good deal of interest in it".

May 24, 1913: Queen's Hall, Brahms V concerto: "[Although in the Tchaikovsky in February she showed] impulsiveness which bordered upon rashness... [now in the Brahms] her playing... was exceedingly careful of detail, and there was a very great beauty in her whole performance. She had evidently studied the work musically as well as technically, as the distinction of her phrasing showed... [but] she did not quite succeed in making clear.. the intricate development of the slow movement".

1915: Aeolian Hall, London, Brahms sonata in D minor, acc. Hamilton Harty: ".. performance was an exceedingly well thought out one, in which the only disadvantage seemed to be a too meticulous care for the emphasis of certain rhythmic accents... [She] was at her best alike in the .. pieces of Kreisler and the .. chaconne by Vitali... In the former her great variety of bowing and her feeling for the effect of sharply contrasted rhythms... gave remarkable life to her playing. In the latter it was chiefly her splendid tone and the display of an accurate technique in high octave passages... which gave the feeling of complete assurance..."

January 23, 1918: Kelowna Theatre, British Columbia: "..she gave a free performance to 350 school children, and had bidden them shut their eyes and hear the bees humming and dream dreams of an imagination known only to childhood... in her evening's programme were: "Devil's Trill," Tartini; "Nocturne in D," Chopin; "Gavotte," Ph. E. Bach; "Prophet Bird," Schumann-Auer; "Hornpipe," Handel-Harty; Andante and Rondo from "Symphonie Espagnole," Lalo; Pradulium and Allegra, Pugnani; "Le Plus que Lente," Debussy; "Pensee Capricieuse," Albert Sammons; "Liebesfreud," Kreisler; "Schön Rosmarin," Kreisler".

1920: Wigmore Hall, Wieniawski concerto, Handel sonata: "The double stops and other ornaments are a model of neatness, and these are helped by a sensitive bow-hand". On February 21, same venue: "... she seems to be absolutely happy when giving out the charming melody; she enjoys it and has the gift of conveying her enjoyment to her hearers".

1923: Queen's Hall, Dvorak v concerto: "Miss Menges fully realized the warmth and passion of the Czech and the power of the fiddle to convey it"

1926, Queen's Hall, Beethoven v concerto: "..capably played.. [but she] improved as the work proceeded. In the first movement her playing was rather cold and uninspired [with an] unimaginative performance by the orchestra.. However she warmed up to the lyrical dialogue in the second movement, and entered upon the third with a gusto..."

== Notable recordings ==
Handel

1923 – Sonata in D. "...the best thing on the violin [in the 2nd quarter of 1923]... This is a glorious piece of playing...."

Bach

1924 – Chaconne, His Master's Voice D 875-6

Beethoven

1923 – Concerto; with Royal Albert Hall Orchestra under Landon Ronald

1925 – Kreuzer sonata; with Arthur De Greef

Brahms

1929 – 2nd and 3rd sonatas; with Harold Samuel

Schubert

1928 – Sonata (Sonatina) for Violin and Piano in G minor, D408; with Arthur de Greef

Vaughan Williams

1928 – The Lark Ascending for violin and orchestra (premiere recording); with Malcolm Sargent
