= Fiber-reinforced cementitious matrix =

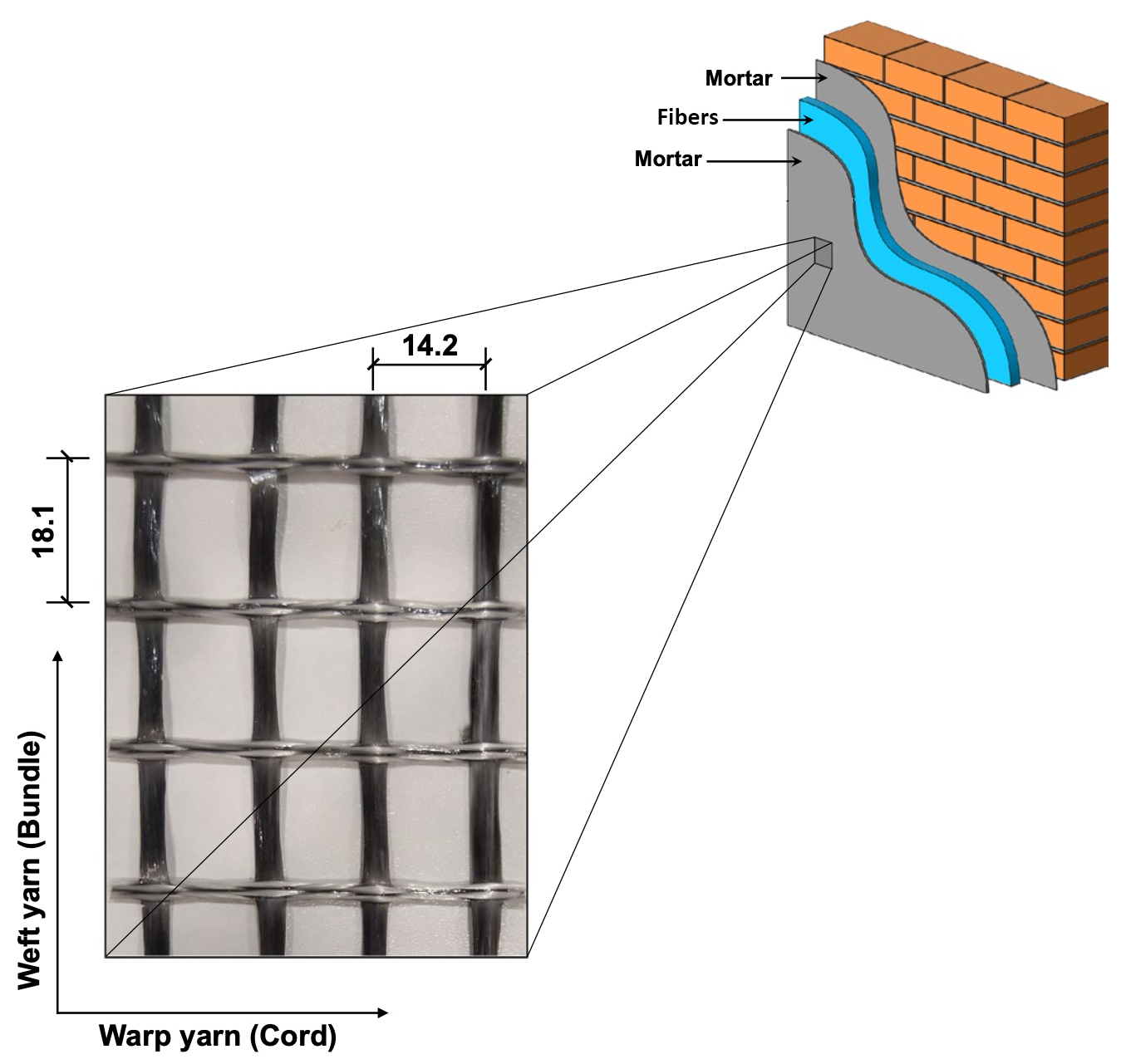
FRCM components: matrix and fibers. The zoom shows the net subdivided in warp and weft

A fiber-reinforced cementitious matrix (FRCM) is a reinforcement system composed by fibers (such as steel, aramid, basalt, plant fibers, carbon, polyparaphenylenebenzobisoxazole, and glass) embedded in an inorganic-based matrix, usually made by cement or lime mortar. Plant fibers are a promising area but they are subjected to degradation in the alkaline environment and elevated temperatures during cement hydration.

In international literature, FRCMs are also called textile-reinforced concrete (TRC), textile reinforced mortars (TRM), fabric-reinforced mortar (FRM), or inorganic matrix-grid composites (IMG).

Starting from the second decade of the 21st century they are used for the structural rehabilitation of existing buildings, in particular made by masonry (existing and historical) or by reinforced concrete, to increase their load-bearing capacity under both vertical and horizontal loads (including seismic ones).

== History ==
FRCM efficacy stands in the association of more materials together to give better mechanical properties to the structural systems. An historical example that shares some features with FRCM is the association of sun-dried clay and straw for the production of bricks in Mesopotamia, or the Roman cocciopesto. The first FRP composite materials appeared in the 1940s in aeronautical engineering. FRCM composite materials, on the other hand, have seen their first applications in the early years of the 21st century. Indeed, in the second decade of the same century, FRCMs have joined the now classic FRPs in terms of importance for structural rehabilitation. This is due to the fact that the inorganic matrix has shown numerous advantages, compared with the organic counterpart (FRP), including a better response when applied to fragile substrates such as masonry and reinforced concrete, thanks to the greater compatibility of the mortar layer when applied on such substrates.

== Properties ==
FRCM composites constitute systems or kits according to the definition set out in point 2 of the art. 2 of EU Regulation 305/2011. They are composed of two fundamental components: an inorganic matrix and a reinforcement. Sometimes, to improve their mechanical characteristics and adherence, connectors, anchoring devices or additives can also be introduced.

An FRCM package is created in situ and applied to the structure that needs to be consolidated. An FRCM system can be constituted by a single textile or by several textiles embedded in a single thickness of mortar.

The matrix (or mortar), cementitious, airborne, hydraulic, bastard or based on natural lime, is reinforced with fibers made by:

- high tensile steel (UHTSS – Ultra High Tensile Strength Steel);
- basalt;
- natural (plant) fibers
- polyparaphenylenebenzobisoxazole (PBO);
- glass;
- carbon;
- aramid.

The fibers constitute the textile. The textile is grouped into yarns and can be dry or impregnated with organic resins. Yarns are grouped into nets and spaced according to a measure to be defined appropriately in accordance with the CNR DT 215.

The main net characteristics to be defined are:

- the distance between yarns in both directions of the textile (respectively called "warp" and "weft");
- weights;
- warping methods.

== Mechanical characteristics ==
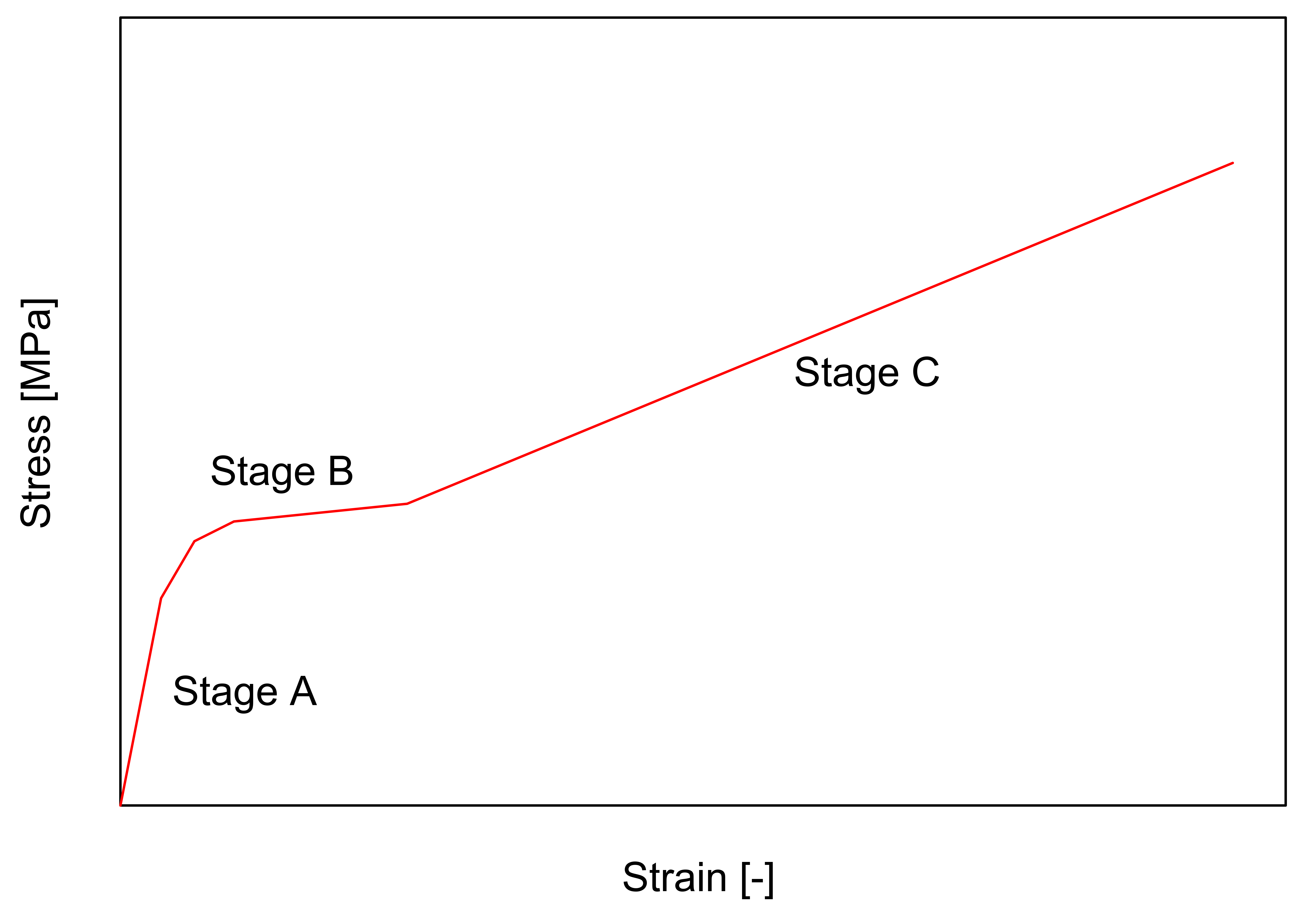
Constitutive law of an FRCM subjected to tensile test

The constitutive stress-strain relationship of an FRCM reinforcement system in a coupon test is characterised by three Stages. Stage A corresponds to the uncracked sample. Stage B corresponds to the sample undergoing cracking. Finally Stage C corresponds to the cracked one. In Stage C the tension is expressed making reference to the area of fibers without considering inorganic matrix. However, the mechanical behavior of FRCMs is very complex, therefore the constitutive relationship is not sufficient to characterise their mechanical behavior. This is due to the fact that FRCM is placed on a substrate. In fact, it is necessary to take into account multiple failure mechanisms that can occur as a result of the interaction between support and reinforcement. Such mechanisms include:

1. the detachment with cohesive failure of the support from the reinforcement system;
2. the detachment at the matrix-support interface;
3. the detachment at the matrix-fiber interface;
4. the sliding of the fiber in the matrix;
5. the sliding of the fiber and the cracking of the outer layer of mortar;
6. the tensile failure of the fiber.

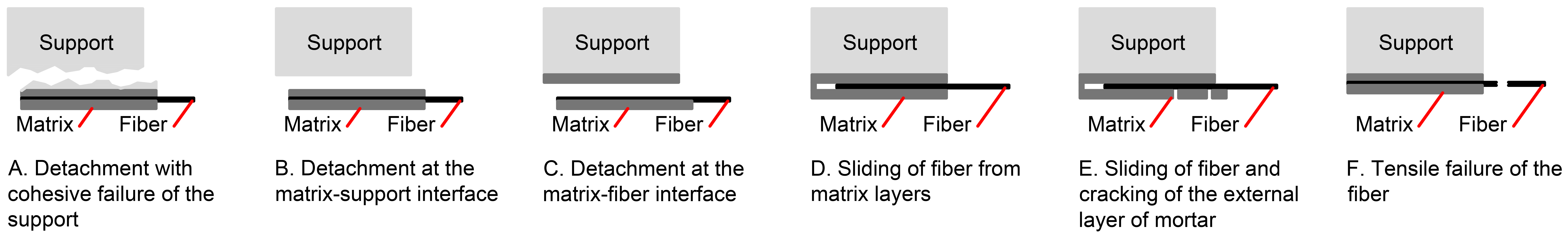
Failure mechanisms

== See also ==
- Reinforced concrete
- Kevlar
