= Thurston Dart =

English musicologist (1921–1971)

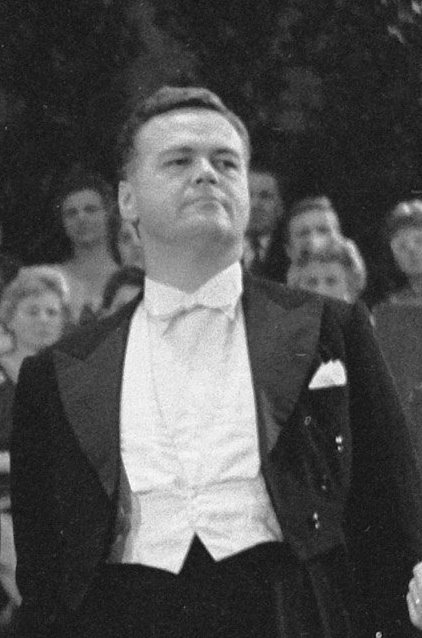
- Dart (1961)
- Born: 3 September 1921; Surbiton
- Died: 6 March 1971 (aged 49); The London Clinic
- Occupations: Musicologist, Professor

Robert Thurston Dart (3 September 1921 – 6 March 1971) was an English musicologist, conductor and keyboard player. Along with Nigel Fortune, Oliver Neighbour and Stanley Sadie, he was one of Britain's leading musicologists of the post-World War II generation. From 1964 until his death he was King Edward Professor of Music at the University of London, based at King's College London.

== Early life ==
Dart was born on 3 September 1921 in Surbiton, then part of Surrey. His father, Henry Thurston Dart, a merchant's clerk, married his mother, Elizabeth Martha Orf in 1915. He attended Hampton Grammar School and sang in the choir at Hampton Court. There he encountered Edmund Fellowes, who gave him encouragement.

A student at the Royal College of Music in London 1938–9, Dart went on to study mathematics at University College, Exeter, being awarded an external BA degree from the University of London in 1942, and in the same year qualified with ARCM status. He then served as a Junior Scientific Officer statistician and researcher in the RAF, working on operational research, until 1945. He was in the strategic bombing Planning Unit under Air Vice Marshal Basil Embry.

Dart was injured in a plane crash in Calais in November 1944, and while convalescing from his injuries at a nursing home in Swanley, he first met Neville Marriner. After leaving the RAF, he studied for a year 1945–6 on a grant with the Belgian musicologist Charles Van den Borren. A further early teacher and influence was Arnold Goldsbrough, a founder of the ensemble that later became the English Chamber Orchestra.

== Academic career ==
Dart returned to England in 1946 as research assistant to Henry Moule, a music lecturer at the University of Cambridge. In 1947 he was appointed assistant lecturer in music in the university, subsequently having posts as lecturer (1952) and professor (1962), and was a Fellow of Jesus College.

During this time, Dart was an effective British supporter of early music revival, in part through his influence on those who went on to form such groups as the Early Music Consort of London: he lent its founder David Munrow, then reading English at Pembroke College, a crumhorn. He taught conductor/musicologist Christopher Hogwood of the Academy of Ancient Music. He taught the conductor John Eliot Gardiner, after Gardiner had left Cambridge, who was also studying with George Hurst.

Philip Brett has been described as "Dart's star pupil". He worked as an undergraduate on the music manuscripts in the collection of Edward Paston, providing provenances and attributions of some pieces to William Byrd. Dart involved him in part of his extensive editorial work of revision of books by Edmund Fellowes.

In 1964 Dart was appointed King Edward Professor of Music at the University of London, based at King's College London. According to Denis Arnold, his reason for leaving Cambridge was the conservatism in its approach to music education. Among his students there was Peter Holman. Michael Nyman, another of his students at King's, wrote in 1972 that Dart "finally realised his vision of a musical education freed from the pointless strangulation of a system still obsessed with harmony and counterpoint."

== Musician ==
As a versatile historical performer, Dart was a successor in the United Kingdom to Arnold Dolmetsch. A continuo player, he made numerous appearances on the harpsichord; he was also a conductor. He performed with the Boyd Neel Orchestra, and when in 1955 Neel moved to Canada, he became its artistic director. The ensemble, renamed Philomusica of London, performed works from Dart's own editions. He resigned his post with it in 1959.

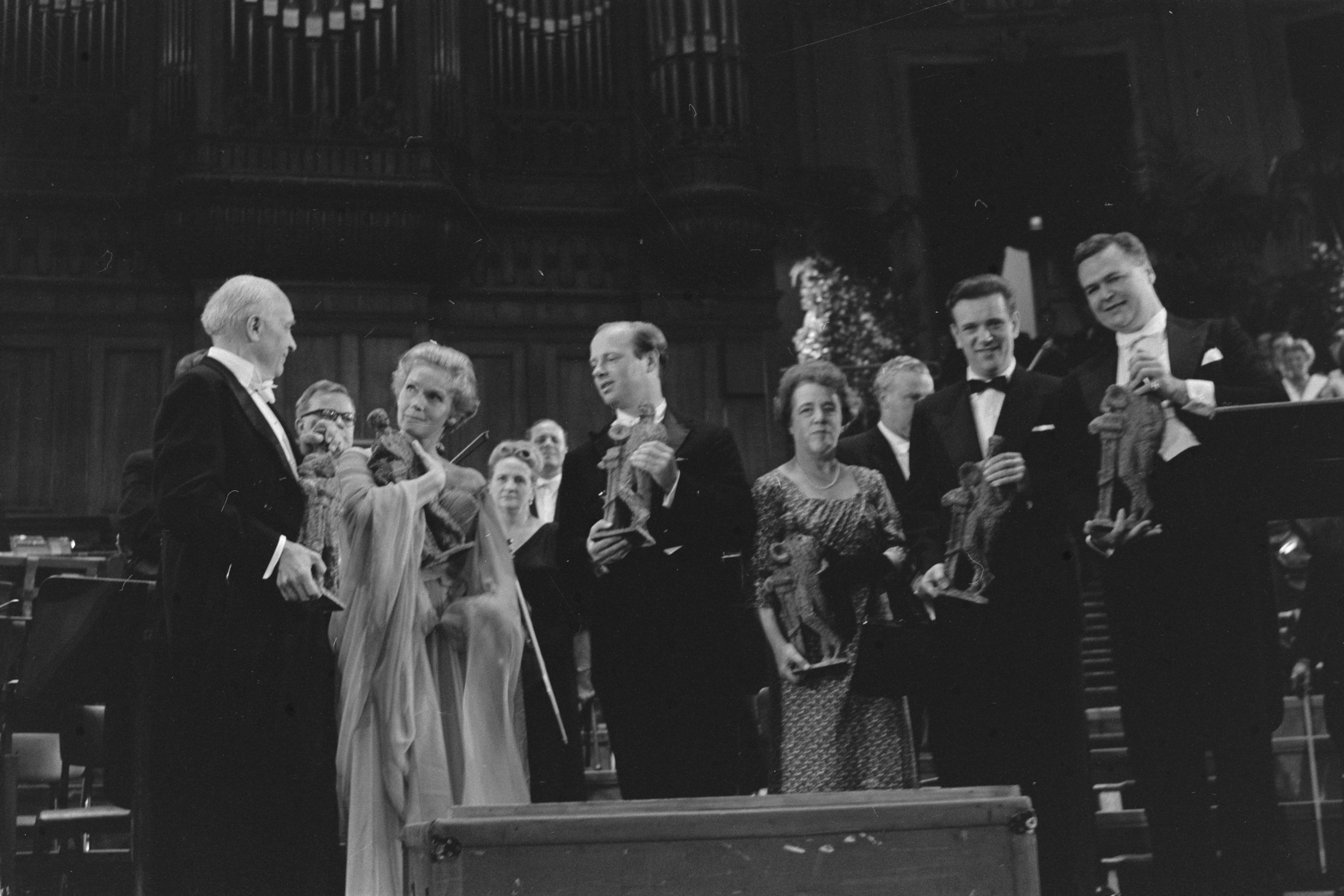
Thurston Dart (far right) in 1961. From left: Robert Casadesus, Elisabeth Schwarzkopf, Bernard Haitink, MS. Schil, Jack Boyce and Thurston Dart

During the 1950s Dart participated in annual concerts featuring four harpsichordists, the three others being George Malcolm, Denis Vaughan and Eileen Joyce. Ultimately Valda Aveling replaced Joyce. Their instruments at this point were modern. Dart and Malcolm were later among those trying replica period harpsichords.

=== Recordings ===
- Music for Three, Four or Five Harpsichords (EMI, 1956): a recording, of the harpsichord ensemble with the Pro Arte Orchestra under Boris Ord. It included Bach's Concerto for Four Harpsichords, an arrangement after Vivaldi; also Variations on a Theme of Mozart by George Malcolm.

Among the early historically informed recordings of the Brandenburg Concertos were those Dart made with the Philomusica of London (1958–59), with a single instrument assigned to each part. He later worked with Neville Marriner on a recording of the Brandenburg Concertos and the four Orchestral Suites. For the instrumentation of the fourth concerto, he had argued that the enigmatic instruction fiauti d'echo written by Bach meant a type of flageolet, used to train caged birds to sing. This interpretation was contentious. The Marriner-Dart recording used sopranino recorders. Nicolaus Harnoncourt has used the less unorthodox treble recorder in F_{4}.

Dart made many harpsichord, clavichord and organ recordings, especially for the L'Oiseau-Lyre label. Louise Hanson-Dyer, founder of the label, was his patron for early keyboard and orchestral pieces. In all Dart made around 90 recordings.

== Death ==
Dart died from stomach cancer in London on 6 March 1971. He was unmarried.

== Works ==
Dart's book The Interpretation of Music (London, 1954), was influential and led to further research into performance. He also wrote numerous articles on aspects of musical sources, performance and interpretation. He was a major contributor to the Musica Britannica volumes. He left an unfinished biography of John Bull.

He served as editor of the Galpin Society Journal from 1947 to 1954. As secretary of Musica Britannica from 1950 to 1965, he saw 34 volumes through the press. He also oversaw the re-editing of the multi-volume series by Edmund Fellowes on William Byrd and the English madrigalists.

== Legacy ==
Source Materials and the Interpretation of Music: A Memorial Volume to Thurston Dart was published in 1981, edited by Ian Bent.

In 1996 the Thurston Dart Professorship of Music was established at King's College London.
