= Sidney Harrison =

British pianist (1903–1986)

Sidney Harrison (4 May 1903 – 8 January 1986) was a British pianist, composer, broadcaster and educationalist who taught at the Guildhall School of Music for many years. His students included Norma Fisher and John Lill, and one of his protégés was George Martin.

== Early life ==
The son of a tailor, Harrison grew up in Hammersmith, London, England, and began playing the piano at the age of four. He studied at the Guildhall School of Music under Francesco Berger and Orlando Morgan and was subsequently a professor of piano there, from 1927 until 1965.

== Career ==
Harrison made his first public appearances in the 1920s as a solo pianist, in chamber ensembles and as a concerto performer, travelling across the UK, Scandinavia, the Low Countries and France. This continued over the next few decades, including frequent BBC broadcasts.

From the 1940s Harrison's broadcasting work expanded into schools programming, music appreciation and as the presenter of gramophone records, continuing until the late 1970s. In 1950 Harrison gave what has been claimed to be the first televised piano lesson. The first of six weekly lessons was broadcast by BBC Television as Piano Lesson No 1 on 10 January 1950. The series continued in November the same year as How to Play the Piano. Harrison was also an occasional composer: published works include a suite The Voyage: five pieces for piano solo (OUP 1949), and the Fantasia on 'Brother James's Air' (OUP 1952).

In 1956 George Martin (who had been encouraged to audition for the Guildhall School by Harrison) recorded some lessons and performances of Debussy and Chopin on a Parlophone extended play record called Sidney Harrison Shows You How. This was followed in 1957 with a BBC TV miniseries Teacher Didn't Tell Me. During the 1960s and 1970s Harrison was a frequent broadcaster, and occasional guest on the BBC television musical quiz show Face the Music.

After 1965 Harrison continued teaching piano at the Royal Academy of Music and adjudicating at competitions. He was chairman of the European Piano Teachers' Association and also the editor of its quarterly Piano Journal. He continued performing at recitals until the end of his life. His dozen books included Music for the Multitude (1939), The Enjoyment of Music (1953), Piano Technique (1953), the autobiographical Teacher Never Told Me (1961) and Grand Piano (1977).

== Personal life ==
During the 1960s he was living by the River Thames at 57 Hartington Road in Chiswick, and later at 37 The Avenue, Chiswick.
