= Colt Clavier Collection =

Keyboard instrument collection

The Colt Clavier Collection was a collection of historical keyboard instruments located in Bethersden, Kent, England. Consisting mostly of 18th and 19th-century pianos, it also included a few harpsichords and a few unusual keyboards which defy standard categorisation. It was thought one of the most important collections of historically important keyboard instruments in the world. Some 114 instruments, the balance of the collection, were sold on 7 June 2018 by Canterbury Auction Galleries.

== Location ==
The Colt Clavier Collection was located in Bethersden, Kent, housed in a community of demonstration houses built by the Colt family. Most of the instruments were housed in a purpose-built building located next to the corporate business office, but each demonstration house also featured an instrument. A few of the instruments were formerly on loan to museums in Germany and Switzerland.

== Scope and importance of collection ==
The collection consisted mainly of pianos (forte-pianos), but also included harpsichords and a few clavichords. The Colt Collection contained the largest single accumulation of Broadwood pianos. The oldest specimen dated to 1775, with the most recent instrument dating to the late 19th century. Consisting in excess of 130 instruments, the collection was one of the largest of its type in England. In addition to actual instruments, the museum displayed numerous images and miscellaneous artefacts related to the history of pianos and their manufacture.

== History ==
The collection was started in 1944 by Charles F. Colt, whose family fortune came by way of constructing prefabricated housing. Colt began his collection with the purchase of an 1827 Broadwood square piano, which cost the sum of £6. Colt stored these instruments at the village hall in Bethersden, which was built by the Colt family, and it was in Bethersden that Colt resided. Eventually the collection grew to size that storage necessitated using several Colt buildings within the village. Colt acquired specimens that held visual appeal as well as historical significance. Many of the instruments are artistically ornate, although some were acquired because of a decided absence of aesthetic sensibility. In the 1940s, many early pianos had been modified to sound like modern instruments. Those that remained in original condition were considered "old fashioned" and therefore valued as little more than decoration pieces. These conditions allowed Colt to acquire many of the specimens inexpensively. Piano-maker Derek Adlam was the curator of the collection from 1936 until 1973. A second building built specifically to house specimens was built in the mid-1970s. Although Colt died in 1985, maintenance of the collection continued under the management of Colt's widow and a board of trustees. Construction was underway in 1994 to create more appropriate space for housing the instruments, as many were difficult to access due to area limitations. The Colt Collection maintained a policy of tightly controlled viewing and playing access, largely in response to damage caused by the public to the historical instruments found in the Fenton House.

== Specimens ==
- Schiedmayer, 1780
- A particularly notable specimen is a "claviorganum" constructed by Merlin in 1784. This instrument combines the strings and the pipes of an organ, although the strings may be disabled. In appearance it is similar to many of the square pianos housed in the Colt collection.
- An 1812 Clementi cottage piano
- An 1818 Érard.
- An 1821 Broadwood which had been sent to the Brighton Royal Pavilion.
- An 1824 Broadwood, significant in that it contains three iron bars which provide structural reinforcement to the piano frame, during a time in which Broadwood and the Érard company were in disagreement as to the origination of this development.
- An 1827 Broadwood square piano, the first instrument acquired by Colt.
- A Graf from the late 1830s.
- An 1840 "dog-kennel" instrument manufactured by Lichtenthal, whose appearance has been described as "ghastly."
- An 1845 Collard and Collard cabinet piano, with an elaborate rosewood case.
- A Joseph Schneider, made approximately 1851. This piano is manufactured out of American bird's eye maple, with a mosaic inlay of wood. It is likely this is the instrument exhibited at the Great Exhibition of 1851. It has simple action, and a warm tone described as "feminine" in keeping with Viennese standards of the time.
- An 1855 Érard, an early example of a "modern" instrument with iron frame and action as currently in use in pianos.
- An 1868 Érard.

== Current status ==
Following concerns about the climate control within the main building, and the proximity of climate-modifying equipment to the instruments, the balance of the collection, some 114 instruments, were sold on 7 June 2018 by Canterbury Auction Galleries. They realised a total of £715,800 (inc premium). A number of instruments are now on display at Hammerwood Park, in East Sussex. Another number of instruments are now in the collection and some on display in the Geelvinck Music Museum Zutphen in Zutphen (Netherlands).

On 11 January 2019 the Department of Culture Media and Sport issued a press release announcing that:

Mahoon’s ‘double-manual harpsichord’, built in 1738, has been blocked from export by Michael Ellis, Minister for Arts, Heritage and Tourism, to provide an opportunity to keep it in the country. "This double-manual harpsichord by Joseph Mahoon is a remarkable survival. As well as its significance in the history of British keyboard instrument making, it is beautiful in its own right.

Mahoon was well-known for such luxurious harpsichords to the extent that the famous print by his contemporary, William Hogarth, in ‘The Rake’s Progress’ series, depicts Handel playing a harpsichord by Mahoon, while accompanying the Bolognese castrato singer, Carlo Farinelli. Given that this may have been a concert instrument it is not impossible that the great composer may have performed on it. This is a considerable rarity redolent of a high point in British musical life. ...

The decision on the export licence application for the item will be deferred until 10 April 2019. This may be extended until 10 July 2019 if a serious intention to raise funds to purchase it is made at the recommended price of £85,560.
