= Colin Timms =

Colin Ronald Timms is a musicologist and retired academic. He was Peyton and Barber Professor of Music at the University of Birmingham from 1992 until 2012, when he retired. After graduating from the University of Cambridge with a Bachelor of Arts degree, he completed Master of Music and Doctor of Philosophy degrees at King's College London, the latter in 1977 for his thesis on the chamber duets of Agostino Steffani. He was a lecturer at Queen's University Belfast from 1970 to 1972, and the University of Birmingham from 1973. In 2004, the British Academy awarded him the Derek Allen Prize for Musicology.

== Selected publications ==
- Polymath of the Baroque: Agostino Steffani and His Music (Oxford University Press, 2003). ISBN 0195154738
- (Edited with Lowell Lindgren) The Correspondence of Agostino Steffani and Giuseppe Riva, 1720-1728, and Related Correspondence with J. P. F. von Schönborn and S. B. Pallavicini, Royal Musical Association Research Chronicle, no. 36 (2003). ISSN 1472-3808
- (Edited with Bruce Wood) Music in the London Theatre from Purcell to Handel (Cambridge University Press, 2017). ISBN 9781107154643
- (Edited with Claudia Kaufold and Nicole K. Strohmann) Agostino Steffani: Europäischer Komponist, hannoverscher Diplomat und Bischof der Leibniz-Zeit [European Composer, Hanoverian Diplomat and Bishop in the Age of Leibniz] (V & R unipress, 2017). ISBN 9783847107095
