= How to Play the Piano =

1950 British instructional TV series

How to Play the Piano is a British television series which was aired in 1950 on BBC. In the programme, Sidney Harrison showed how to play the piano to a pupil, Edward Goodwin. Episode titles included "how to practise", "how to play with expression", and "how do you play?". It aired in a 30-minute time-slot.

== See also ==
- Piano Lesson TV series
