= The Interpretation of Music =

1954 book by Thurston Dart, English musicologist and conductor

The Interpretation of Music is a book by Thurston Dart. It is described by the Encyclopædia Britannica as "the best direct and concise account of the issues of performance".

This book deals with correct performance conventions and procedures relevant to different periods and styles (for example Gregorian intonation, divisions upon parts, French baroque over-dotting, etc.). It covers these various topics in a chronological order, also giving descriptions of period instruments and their uses. It is a book useful for those wishing to compose in a more authentic antiquated style, and for those wishing to make performances more historically "correct".
