= Licentiate of the Royal Academy of Music =

Professional diploma

Licentiate of the Royal Academy of Music (LRAM) is a professional diploma, or licentiate, formerly open to both internal students of the Royal Academy of Music and to external candidates in voice, keyboard and orchestral instruments and guitar, as well as conducting and other musical disciplines. Candidates in instrumental and vocal studies could opt to take the LRAM in either teaching or performing. Since the 1990s, the external route has been withdrawn and now the diploma provides a comprehensive introduction to the principles of teaching through practical work. The LRAM is available to all students of the Royal Academy of Music.

Those awarded the diploma are entitled to use the post-nominal letters LRAM and to wear the appropriate academic dress: black bachelors' gown with scarlet silk hood of simple shape, the cowl part-lined 3 inches and bound 1/4 inch with old gold silk, the neckband fully lined and bound 1/4 inch of old gold silk.

== See also ==
- Associate of the Royal College of Music (ARCM)
- List of fellows of the Royal College of Music (FRCM)
