= Harold Samuel =

English pianist and pedagogue (1879–1937)

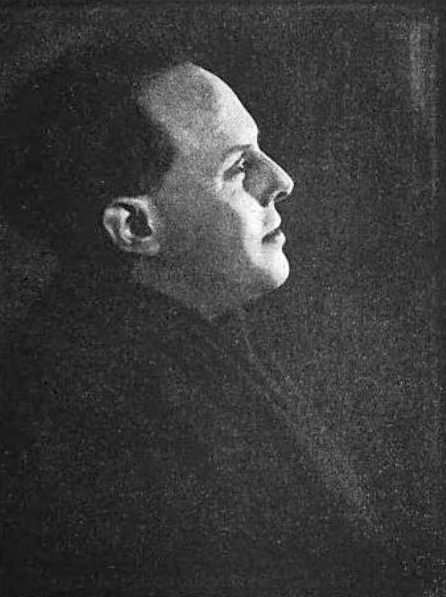
- Born: 23 May 1879; London, England
- Died: 15 January 1937 (aged 57); Hampstead, London, England
- Education: Royal College of Music
- Occupations: Pianist, pedagogue

Harold Samuel (23 May 1879 – 15 January 1937) was a distinguished English pianist and pedagogue. He was one of the first pianists of the twentieth century to focus purely on the works of Johann Sebastian Bach, and was known for his academic and cerebral approach. He was also a minor composer.

== Career ==
Harold Samuel was born in London and studied piano at the Royal College of Music with the eminent scholar and pianist Edward Dannreuther and composition with Sir Charles Villiers Stanford. Later he was on its faculty as professor of pianoforte.

Harold Samuel was particularly distinguished as an interpreter of Bach, whose entire keyboard oeuvre he learned by heart. At his London début in 1898 he played Bach's Goldberg Variations (BWV 988), unknown at that time in London. He and Walter Gieseking were among the first pianists of the twentieth century to play pure-Bach, distinguished for having programmed large scale works by Bach in their recitals.

To make a living Harold Samuel taught (he was, for example, the piano teacher of the British composers Benjamin Britten and Elizabeth Poston), did vocal coaching and became a sought-after accompanist (performing especially with violinist Isolde Menges). His solo career, however, was at a standstill until 1919 when he played an all-Bach programme in London. He soon found a ready audience for large amounts of Bach's keyboard works in their original form. In 1921 he gave six successive Bach recitals in London and a similar cycle in New York City. He toured the US regularly from 1924. He wrote a musical comedy, Hon'ble Phil, songs and piano pieces.

On 15 January 1937 he died at his home in Hampstead, London aged 57. He had fallen ill two months before on board a ship returning from a tour of South Africa.

== Performance style ==
Compared with Gieseking's instrumental and musical mastery, Samuel may sound correct, academic and less interesting, but we have too few documents of how he played other composers to gain a full understanding of his art. He helped prepare listeners for then unfamiliar compositions by Bach through an honest and earnest approach. His interpretations of Brahms were also admired. In 1925 he gave the first performance of Herbert Howells's Piano Concerto.

== Recordings ==
A few recordings (apparently live) by Samuel can be heard on Duo-Art piano-rolls (at least via their MIDI scans). Recordings made acoustically by Samuel can also be heard via YouTube (see this link on YouTube). APR has collected Samuel's complete solo recordings in a 2-disc set. As a composer, Samuel's Three Light Pieces (1913) for clarinet and piano have been recorded by John Bradbury and Ian Buckle.

== Publications ==
The edition of Bach's 48 Preludes and Fugues (The Well-Tempered Clavier) in two volumes, published in 1924 for the Associated Board of the Royal Schools of Music, still in print (in revised form) and in use today, was prepared by Professor Donald Tovey, but was fingered throughout by Harold Samuel.

== Sources ==
- Samuel Harold plays Bach (1923–1927)
- Eaglefield-Hull, Alfred. A Dictionary of Modern Music and Musicians, Dent, 1924.
- Lyman, Darryl. Great Jews in Music, J. D. Publishers, 1986.
- Sadie, Stanley. The new Grove dictionary of music and musicians, Macmillan, 1980.
- Schonberg, Harold C. The great pianists, Simon and Schuster, 1963
- Sendrey, Alfred. Bibliography of Jewish music, Columbia University Press, 1951.
