= Associate of the Royal College of Music =

Associate of the Royal College of Music (ARCM) was a professional qualification awarded by the Royal College of Music. Like the Licentiate of the Royal Academy of Music (LRAM), it was offered in teaching or performing.

There is no obvious successor to the ARCM qualification since the RCM undergraduates now follow a B.Mus(Hons) course accredited by the Royal College of Music. However in 2012 approximately a quarter of the academic staff included ARCM in their lists of qualifications.

When the basic Graduate course led to the Graduate of the Royal Schools of Music (GRSM) diploma, a condition of graduating was an ARCM pass in Teaching or Performing.

Those awarded the diploma are entitled to use the post-nominal letters ARCM and to wear the appropriate academic dress: black gown of Oxford BA pattern, with a royal blue silk hood of simple shape, the cowl part-lined 3 inches and bound 1/4 inch with old gold silk, the neckband fully lined and bound 1/4 inch of old gold silk.

Holders of the ARCM qualification were able to obtain fully qualified teacher status, following successful completion of a one year's post graduate study at a college of education in the UK.

== See also ==
- List of fellows of the Royal College of Music (FRCM)
