= Melvyn Tan =

British musician

Melvyn Tan Ban Eng (Chinese: 陈万荣; born 13 October 1956) is a Singapore-born British classical pianist, noted for his study of historical performance practice.

From a young age, he went to England to study, first at the Yehudi Menuhin School when he was twelve years old, later enrolling at the Royal College of Music where he studied with Angus Morrison. At the Royal College, he was told by the then director Sir David Willcocks that he would have to study a second instrument; so he chose the harpsichord, which began his interest in early keyboards.

Upon returning to Singapore in 2005, he was fined for not having done National Service in Singapore, although he was studying in London during the time he was required to serve and did not have an exit permit to MINDEF, he had already started a busy concert career, and he had already acquired British citizenship.

During his development as a pianist, Tan developed a passion for the fortepiano, which he has promoted throughout his career, and thereby changed other musicians' perceptions of this instrument. He was invited to play and record on Beethoven's Broadwood instrument. He has now returned mainly to the pianoforte and performs a wide-ranging repertoire from Bach to Messiaen. Of Messiaen, Tan has announced that mastering the composer's Vingt regards sur l'enfant-Jésus has been his proudest accomplishment: "It took me nearly two years to learn it, but it was the most life-enriching, the most life-changing experience because it was so spiritual and it changed the way I performed."

He has lived in London since 1978, and continues to give concerts worldwide. In 2007, he performed at the Royal Academy of Arts for Jasper Conran's London Fashion Week collection.
