= Adrian Cruft =

British composer (1921–1987)

Adrian Francis Cruft (10 February 1921 – 20 February 1987) was a British composer.

== Career ==
Cruft, the son of the double-bassist Eugene Cruft, was educated at Westminster Abbey Choir School (where he was head chorister) and Westminster School. He was a Boult conducting scholar at the Royal College of Music from 1938, completing his studies there briefly in 1946–1947 after service in World War II. He was a composition student of Gordon Jacob and Edmund Rubbra but also studied double bass with his father. From 1947 until 1969 he played double bass with all the major London orchestras. Cruft became chairman of the Composers' Guild of Great Britain 1966, and helped set up the British Music Information Centre at 10 Stratford Place.

Cruft, called a "performers' composer" by Roderick Swanston, was as a young chorister influenced by the revival of Tudor music, and later by the counterpoint of Bach. Hugo Cole described his music as "diatonic, firmly based in tradition and generally straightforward in idiom". He composed church music, including four cantatas, settings of the canticles, anthems and carols, as well as orchestral works, chamber music and pieces for children and amateurs.

Ruth Gipps composed the short orchestral work Ambarvalia in memory of Cruft.

== Selected works ==
- Alma Redemptoris Mater, cantata
- An hymne of heavenly love, cantata
- A Bemerton Cantata (1970)
- Collegium Regale canticles
- Concertino for clarinet and strings (1955)
- A Country Suite for school or amateur orchestra (1964)
- Divertimento for strings
- Dr Syn, opera in three acts
- The Eatanswill Election, opera
- Oxford Suite for orchestra
- Partita for orchestra
- Prospero's Island, orchestral overture (1962)
- Rex Tragicus, a passion cantata
- Suite for Strings (1957)
