= Musica Britannica =

British music publication series

Musica Britannica is a trust founded in 1951, as "providing an authoritative edition of those classics of English music not yet available in print". One of its co-founders, Anthony Lewis, served as the publication's first chief editor for many years.
