= Philip Cranmer =

English musician

Philip Cranmer (1918–2006) was an English teacher of and composer of classical music.

== Biography ==
Cranmer was born in Birmingham, England, in 1918, and was a contemporary of composer John Gardner at Wellington College, Berkshire and became a BBC staff accompanist at Birmingham between 1948 and 1950. He was a lecturer at the University of Birmingham between 1950 and 1954, then became Professor of Music at Queen's University Belfast between 1954 and 1970, then held a similar position at the University of Manchester between 1970 and 1975. He was the Secretary at the Associated Board of the Royal Schools of Music between 1974 and 1983. Cranmer died in Balcombe, West Sussex in 2006.
