= Anthony Lewis (musician) =

British composer

Lewis by Pamela Thalben-Ball, 1976

Sir Anthony Carey Lewis CBE (2 March 1915 – 5 June 1983) was an English musicologist, conductor, composer, and music educator. He co-founded and served as the first chief editor of Musica Britannica, producing scholarly editions of British music hitherto unavailable. He published critical editions of operas by Handel, Purcell and John Blow.

After working in the music department of the BBC, Lewis became professor of music at the University of Birmingham (1947–68) and was principal of the Royal Academy of Music in London (1968–82).

As a conductor Lewis played a role in the baroque music revival of the mid 20th century by directing performances of several Handel opera revivals, and making commercial premiere recordings of works from the 17th and 18th centuries.

== Life and career ==
=== Early years ===
Lewis was born in Bermuda, the youngest of the three children – all boys – of Major Leonard Carey Lewis (1880–1952) and his wife, Katherine Barbara, née Sutton (1884–1965). There was a military tradition on both sides of the family, which the young Lewis did not follow: his musical talent became clear from his early years and he was sent to Salisbury Cathedral choir school, and at the age of eight he became a chorister at St George's Chapel, Windsor. At the age of 13 Lewis attended the Royal Academy of Music (RAM), London, studying composition with William Alwyn. He won a scholarship to Wellington College, from where, in 1932, he went to Peterhouse, Cambridge. There, according to The Times, he was "one of the most brilliant of his generation to have come under the influence of E. J. Dent". A scholarship enabled him to spend some months studying in Paris with Nadia Boulanger in 1934. He graduated the following year as BA and MusB.

=== BBC, wartime and postwar ===
In September 1935 Lewis joined the music staff of the BBC under the corporation's director of music, Adrian Boult. He produced a favourably-received series of programmes, Handel in Rome, and took over the pioneering educational series, The Foundations of Music, for which he sometimes conducted or played the organ as well as producing. He frequently focused on music by Purcell and earlier composers such as Byrd, whose music was then little known. Lewis later took on responsibility for all broadcast chamber music. At the Henry Wood Promenade Concerts his choral Overture, consisting of vocalise for an eight-part unaccompanied choir was premiered in 1938.

During the Second World War Lewis joined the Royal Army Ordnance Corps, serving in the Middle East. In addition to his official duties he helped to organise, and conducted, concerts for the troops. After the war, Lewis returned to the BBC in 1946. His brief was to plan and take charge of the music in the new Third Programme. The Times commented, "its famously high musical standards were substantially due to Lewis's combination of scholarly curiosity and painstaking efficiency".

=== Birmingham and Musica Britannica ===
In 1947, at the age of 32, Lewis joined the faculty of the University of Birmingham as Peyton and Barber Professor of Music, a post he held for 21 years. In The Musical Times his former student and later colleague Nigel Fortune noted that as well as "developing an academically fertile department", Lewis conducted "a wide range of music in professional concerts and with university forces", in demanding modern works such as Les noces and Cantata Profana.

At Birmingham, Lewis continued his efforts to revive Baroque music. In live performance he set high standards for performances of choral and stage works. The Musical Times praised his pioneering recordings of little-known works such as Monteverdi's Vespro della Beata Vergine and Purcell's The Fairy-Queen and King Arthur, which the magazine considered set new standards. Lewis was an early proponent of the revival of Handel operas, which for 200 years had been generally regarded as unstageable.

During his early years as professor at Birmingham, Lewis approached the Royal Musical Association with a proposal to launch a national edition of British music, making available scholarly editions of otherwise generally unpublished scores. He contended:

in certain fields and at certain periods, England has occupied a central, and not merely a marginal or subsidiary place in European musical history. But we cannot expect English music to be seen in its true perspective or granted its rightful status if we allow the present enormous gaps in modern printed editions to persist.

The proposal was agreed, and resulted in the inception of Musica Britannica in 1951. Lewis was its general editor, assisted by Thurston Dart. In its first 20 years the undertaking produced more than 30 volumes.

In 1954 Lewis was appointed chairman of the music advisory panel of the Arts Council of Great Britain, holding the post until 1965. While at Birmingham, Lewis married Lesley Lisle Smith (b. 1924) on 10 September 1959. There were no children.

=== Royal Academy of Music ===
In 1968 Lewis was appointed principal of the RAM on the retirement of Sir Thomas Armstrong. His biographer Michael Pope observes that the balance between academic and artistic work that characterised Lewis's life was now tilted away from pure scholarship: "for the next fourteen years he presided over many important developments in an institution where the emphasis was on performance and composition." He was concerned at a perceived split in the musical profession between musicologists and performers, and maintained, "each should look to the other for help, for between them they could enable a great advance to be made in the interpretation of music". The Times judged the post to be well suited to Lewis's talents, and one that he filled with distinction. During his term of office the academy built its own theatre, with about 300 seats, next to the main building. It opened in 1977 with an operatic triple bill by Purcell, Gardner and Sullivan, in which Lewis shared the conducting with Steuart Bedford.

Lewis was president of the Royal Musical Association from 1963 to 1969; a member of the music committee of the British Council, 1967–73; and a director of English National Opera between 1974 and 1978.

Lewis was appointed CBE in 1967 and knighted in 1972. He was awarded an honorary DMus by Birmingham University in 1970, and he held honorary memberships or fellowships of Trinity College of Music (1948), the Royal Academy of Music (1960), the Guildhall School of Music and Drama (1969), the Royal College of Music (1971), the Royal Northern College of Music (1974), and the Royal Scottish Academy of Music and Drama (1980).

In 1982 Lewis retired from the RAM. He died at his home in Haslemere the following year, at the age of 68. In his honour the RAM established the Sir Anthony Lewis memorial prize for student performers using the repertory of Musica Britannica.

== Works ==
=== Compositions ===
In his Who's Who entry Lewis selected eight of his works for mention: Psalm 86 (1935), A Choral Overture (1937), City Dances for orchestra (1944), Trumpet Concerto (1947), Three Invocations (1949), A Tribute of Praise (1951), Horn Concerto (1956), and Canzona for Orchestra – Homage to Purcell (1959).

=== Editions ===
Working either with collaborators including Dart, Fortune, Charles Mackerras and Watkins Shaw, or, more often, on his own, Lewis was responsible for scholarly editions of 17th- and 18th-century scores including Handel's Apollo e Dafne, Athalia and Semele, John Blow's Venus and Adonis, and many works by Purcell, including The Fairy-Queen and four volumes of sacred music.

=== Recordings ===
Lewis was particularly associated with the record label L'Oiseau-Lyre, which specialised in 17th- and 18th-century music. For them and others he conducted recordings of Purcell's Dido and Aeneas and The Fairy-Queen, Blow's Venus and Adonis, Handel's Semele, Sosarme, Monteverdi's Vespers, Rameau's Hippolyte et Aricie, and several sets of operatic excerpts and orchestral and choral music of the 17th- and 18th-centuries.
