= Eugene Cruft =

British musician (1887–1976)

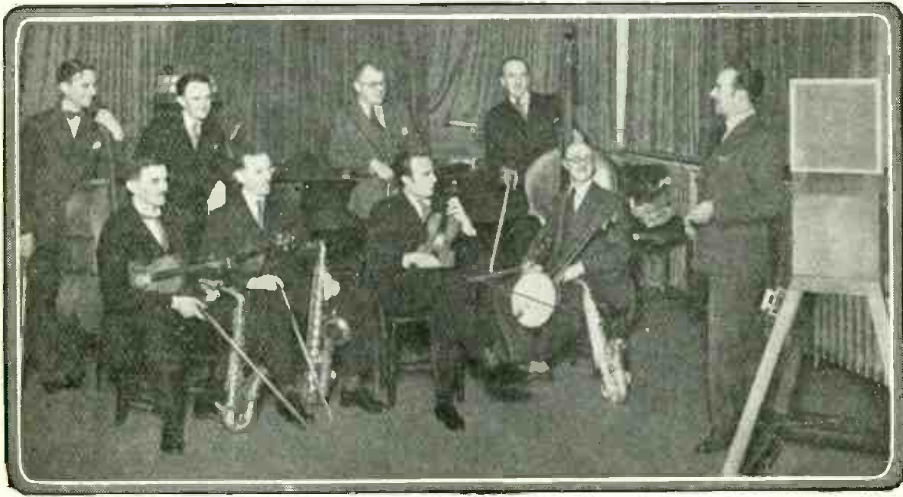
"Eugene Cruft and His Octet", from the BBC Hand Book 1928

Eugene John Cruft OBE MVO (8 June 1887 – 4 June 1976) was a British double bass player. He has been called the "leading double-bass player of his generation".

== Life ==
Eugene Cruft was born in London, son of John Cruft (1857-1937), principal viola in the Carl Rosa Opera Company. Eugene Cruft started in the London Symphony Orchestra in 1912, and was principal double-bass player in the BBC Symphony Orchestra 1929-1947, as well as in several other orchestras such as the Royal Opera House (Covent Garden) and the Bath Festival Orchestra.

Cruft, whose great influence as a teacher of his instrument is pointed out by Grove's music dictionary, taught as professor of double-bass at the Royal College of Music and at the National Youth Orchestra. He also published The Eugene Cruft School of Double-Bass Playing, in the introduction of which he wrote: 'We never hear anyone say "I like music, so I think I'll learn the double-bass" but there is really no reason why they should not.'

Cruft chaired the company running the Pro Arte Orchestra (and played in it) when it was founded in 1955. He was also responsible for the organization of the orchestras at the coronations of both George VI and Elizabeth II. He was made a MVO and an OBE.

== Family ==
Eugene Cruft's son Adrian Cruft was a notable composer, and another son, John Cruft, was an oboist who became the Secretary of the London Symphony Orchestra in 1949.John went on from running the LSO to become Music Director of the British Council from 1959 - 1964 when he joined the Arts Council of Great Britain as the music director, a position he retained until his retirement in 1981. A grandson, Benedict Cruft, is a violinist and was the Dean of the School of Music of the Hong Kong Academy for Performing Arts, whose tenure ended in July, 2013.
