= The Box of Delights (TV series) =

1984 British children's television series

- Based on: The Box of Delights by John Masefield
- Screenplay by: Alan Seymour
- Directed by: Renny Rye
- Starring: Devin Stanfield; Patrick Troughton; Robert Stephens
- Theme music composer: Victor Hely-Hutchinson
- Opening theme: Andante quasi lento e contabile from Carol Symphony
- Composer: Roger Limb
- Country of origin: United Kingdom
- No. of episodes: 6

Production
- Producer: Paul Stone
- Running time: 30 minutes

Original release
- Network: BBC1
- Release: 21 November – 24 December 1984

The Box of Delights is a BBC Television adaptation of John Masefield's 1935 children's fantasy novel The Box of Delights starring Devin Stanfield, Patrick Troughton and Robert Stephens. It was broadcast on BBC1 between 21 November and 24 December 1984. The series was adapted from Masefield's novel by Alan Seymour, directed by Renny Rye and produced by Paul Stone.

The series is a fantasy adventure about a schoolboy who is entrusted with a magical box which allows him to time travel and shapeshift to protect the box from an evil magician. An innovative mixture of live action and animation, the production made extensive use of the Quantel Paintbox and chroma key effects. The series cost £1 million to make in 1984 (£3.36 million in 2025), the most expensive children's series the BBC had made to that date, but it was widely acclaimed and won a number of BAFTA and RTS awards, in particular for its special effects.

== Plot ==
Kay Harker (Devin Stanfield) is returning from boarding school for Christmas 1934 when he finds himself mixed up in a battle to possess a magical box. The current owner of the box is an old Punch and Judy man called Cole Hawlings (Patrick Troughton) whom Kay meets at the railway station. They develop an instant rapport, which leads Cole to confide that he is being chased by a magician called Abner Brown (Robert Stephens) and his gang, which includes Kay's former governess.

The box allows the owner to shrink in size, to shapeshift, to fly, to travel to the past and to experience various magical wonders and creatures, and thus is sought for evil purposes by Abner. Cole (who turns out to be the medieval philosopher and alleged magician Ramon Llull) entrusts the box to Kay. The schoolboy then goes on to have many adventures across time as he protects the box from Abner Brown.

During his travels, Kay encounters many characters drawn from English folklore, history and pagan mythology including Herne the Hunter, King Arthur, Father Christmas, unicorns, Roman soldiers and medieval monks.

=== Episodes ===
The series was first shown in six half-hour episodes in November and December 1984. BBC Worldwide released the serial on VHS in the 1980s and 1990s and on DVD in 2004. One of the special features the 2004 DVD included was an interview between Rye and Stanfield as part of the 20th anniversary and was filmed at Pinewood Studios. The series was released on DVD and Blu-ray in November 2024. It contains the same special features as the 2004 DVD release and a new documentary Time And Tide – Making The Box of Delights. The series was broadcast on BBC Four in December 2024 as part of its 40th anniversary. A nine minute documentary, Renny Rye Remembers... The Box of Delights was broadcast on BBC Four in the same month.

No.	Title	Original release date
1	"When the Wolves were Running"	21 November 1984
Schoolboy Kay Harker travels home for Christmas and meets a strange Punch and Judy man at the railway station.
2	"Where shall the 'nighted Showman go?"	28 November 1984
Fearing that he is soon to be kidnapped, Cole Hawlings entrusts the Box of Delights to Kay.
3	"In darkest Cellars underneath"	5 December 1984
Kay and Mouse spy on Abner from the Prince Rupert Arms.
4	"The Spider in the Web"	12 December 1984
Kay and Peter fly to the Chester Hills to unravel the mystery of the kidnappings and to find Abner's hideaway.
5	"Beware of Yesterday"	19 December 1984
On Christmas Eve, Abner Brown discovers that the missing box is at the Bishop's Palace.
6	"Leave us not Little, nor yet Dark"	24 December 1984
Kay is trapped in the dungeons of the Bishop's Palace, and has to find the magic box before it is too late.

During December 1986 the series was repeated on BBC1 as three 50-minute episodes:

No.	Title	Original release date
1	"When the Wolves Were Running"	22 December 1986
2	"The Spider in the Web"	23 December 1986
3	"Fire and Flood"	24 December 1986

== Cast ==
- Kay Harker: Devin Stanfield
- Abner Brown: Robert Stephens
- Cole Hawlings: Patrick Troughton
- Foxy Faced Charles: Geoffrey Larder
- Chubby Joe: Jonathan Stephens
- Sylvia Daisy Pouncer: Patricia Quinn
- Inspector: James Grout
- Bishop of Tatchester: John Horsley
- Caroline Louisa: Carol Frazer
- Jemima: Heidi Burton
- Maria: Joanna Dukes
- Susan: Flora Page
- Peter: Crispin Mair
- Herne the Hunter: Glyn Baker
- The Old Lady: Anne Dyson
- Ellen: Helen Fraser
- Chief Constable: Charles Pemberton
- Rat: Bill Wallis
- Pirate Rat: Nick Berry
- The Waterfall Boy: Jason Kemp (previously credited as Anthony Kemp)
- The Bronze Head: Nicholas Chagrin
- Arnold of Todi: Philip Locke
- Greek Captain: Bruce White
- Greek Soldier: Julian Sands
- Greek Soldier: Angus Kennedy
- Mouse: Simon Barry

== Production ==
=== Development ===
John Masefield was the Poet Laureate of the United Kingdom between 1930 and his death in 1967, but alongside his poetry he also wrote books for children. The Box of Delights or When the Wolves Were Running, published in 1935, was the sequel to his 1927 book The Midnight Folk. Masefield's novel had been adapted by the BBC for radio several times; a six-part adaptation, with a script by Robert Holland and John Keir Cross was produced three times as part of its Children's Hour with different casts in 1943, 1948 and 1955. A new radio adaptation by John Keir Cross had been produced for Saturday Night Theatre in 1966, then remade with a new cast in 1977.

Producer Paul Stone had a longstanding ambition to create "the ultimate in children's drama" after discovering Masefield's 1935 novel The Box of Delights in the 1970s. Stone told Books for Keeps: "As soon as I read it I wanted to make it for television. It's an amazing and singular mixture of adventure story and poetic myth and the writing is packed with visual imagery...television is uniquely able to translate those qualities from one medium to another".

It took Stone ten years to obtain the rights and to get the green light on the production. There had been plans to make a Hollywood feature film of the book, so the rights had to be re-negotiated with the Masefield Trust, who administered the author's estate. Stone said in an interview with the Radio Times that this delay was "a blessing" since the story "call[ed] for feats of animation which television simply couldn't realise five, perhaps even two or three years ago".

Director Renny Rye was at that time on staff in the BBC Children's and Education department at Television Centre, but had previous experience from the drama department, so was chosen by Edward Barnes to direct what would be one of their most ambitious children's dramas to date. With a large number of effects shots, coupled with extensive location filming, the production was the most expensive children's drama the BBC had yet created, costing more than £1 million in 1984.

=== Casting ===
To play Kay Harker, the main child protagonist, two hundred children were auditioned. Director Renny Rye recalled: "My purist notion was that children's imagination was so great they could do it better if they hadn't been tutored. So I went round lots of schools and saw children from many, many schools". Devin Stanfield was chosen on account of having "a good face without seeming too modern or too handsome...the demands of filming called for someone with a great deal of stamina [with] a ready imagination, especially as he'd be called upon to react to invisible delights that would only afterwards be electronically added to the film". Stanfield was the grandson of the actor Leslie Sands and had previously had a few small parts in television programmes.

The kindly Punch and Judy man Cole Hawlings was played by Patrick Troughton, famous for his portrayal of the Second Doctor in Doctor Who between 1966 and 1969. Renny Rye said that Troughton "was my favourite Doctor Who...[he] had a quality that is unsurpassed, I think, as someone to pull you into a tale". A Blue Peter feature at the time connected Cole Hawlings to the actor's earlier role, observing that Troughton was once again playing a mysterious, scruffy time traveller.

Robert Stephens was cast to play the antagonist Abner Brown. He recalled hearing the 1948 BBC Radio production on Children's Hour when he was seventeen and was so thrilled to be asked to appear in the television version he replied "Of course - for nothing!" At the time, he was portraying one of the ugly sisters in a panto when Rye discussed the role with him. Stephens said that he enjoyed the novel's depiction of the "magician and gangster" Abner dressing as a clergyman, since it upset the expectations of the audience. In a review for Charlie Brooker's Screenwipe, Rhys Thomas said that Stephens "put so much into it...he doesn't camp it up and make it funny, he's just really frightening".

Stephens' partner and future wife, Patricia Quinn, best known for The Rocky Horror Picture Show, was cast as Brown's own partner in crime, Sylvia Daisy Pouncer.

Herne the Hunter was portrayed by Glyn Baker who previously played an imperial officer, Lieutenant Endicott in Return of the Jedi. He is the son of the actor and film producer Stanley Baker.

Julian Sands was cast as one of the Greek soldiers. According to Rye, Sands "also loved the story and wanted to be involved".

=== Filming ===
Railway station scenes were filmed at Bewdley and Arley on the steam heritage Severn Valley Railway; Tewkesbury became the fictional Tatchester; the bishop's children's party was recorded at Kinlet Hall, Shropshire (the location of Moffats Independent School, whose pupils and staff served as extras); and the interior of Hereford Cathedral and its choir were featured extensively in the final episode (although the exterior of "Tatchester Cathedral" was Tewkesbury Abbey). Exterior shots of Abner Brown's theological college were filmed at Eastnor Castle, near Ledbury, Herefordshire. The snowy mountainous landscape of King Arthur's castle was filmed at the Peel of Lumphanan, Lumphanan, Aberdeenshire. During filming, the crew were almost snowed in by 12-foot blizzards. Renny Rye recalled: "We could hardly use any of the locations I'd recced because we couldn't get out of the hotel. Nearly all the locations were unreachable because the snow was so thick (which is why it looks quite magical in the film), so virtually all of it was shot in the hotel gardens".

=== Visual effects ===
Patrick Troughton, as Cole Hawlings, demonstrates the Box of Delights to Kay Harker. For this effects shot, eleven separate video inputs were required using Colour Separation Overlay to add the actors (in a blue studio) onto a 'snow vortex' background; separate video inputs were required for the Quantel Paintbox which added the encroaching slow-motion background, which had been shot on location several months earlier.

The production featured an ambitious number of visual effects for its day, particularly the combining of real actors and hand-drawn animation in the Herne the Hunter scenes. These effects were supervised by Tony Harding (visual effects designer) and Robin Lobb (video effects). Paul Stone told the Radio Times that the programme featured "new sophistications of colour separation overlay, of the electronic 'paintbox' and the Quantel technologies". The latter allowed the shrinking of the actor to one-twentieth of the original image size, allowing Kay to shrink to a toy boat or Cole to disappear into a painting. Colour Separation Overlay (the BBC's term for chroma keying) had been in use at the Corporation since the 1970s, but had not been used to the extent of The Box of Delights. Unlike the more common green screen used for digital effects, CSO used blue as the primary keying colour.

When production began, Rye said that this process could only be created live in a studio, so the composite background and foreground images had to be fed through a desk. The visual effects team designed a system which took a black and white key of the foreground subject at the same time, meaning that images taken some time apart could be combined in post-production. Rye said that "this was the biggest leap forward technically at the time".

The post-production process took six months, aided by the BBC developing a new effects studio at Television Centre. The staff were able to use the programme as a test bed for new technology. For example, the Ampex Digital Optics (ADO) machine was purchased for the studio shortly after post-production work began meaning that they would zoom composite video sources during flying sequences. Rye recalled for one effects shot in episode 2 that they "had to link up eleven separate inputs into this video studio. Seven or eight of them were video machines, which were downstairs. We were taking machines away from Match of the Day highlights and Top of the Pops, which were being made at the same time, to feed images in to create one image".

== Soundtrack ==
The opening and closing title music features an orchestral arrangement of "The First Nowell" extracted from the third movement of the Carol Symphony (Andante quasi lento e contabile) by Victor Hely-Hutchinson. The movement had previously been used for the 1940s Children's Hour radio adaptation and has become synonymous with the story. Hely-Hutchinson wrote his Carol Symphony in 1927, and had a long association with the BBC, eventually becoming its director of music in 1944 until his death aged 45 during the harsh winter of 1947 when he caught pneumonia as a result of refusing to turn on the heating in his office.

Jon Jacob described the work's suitability for the titles: "It's not immediately obvious what we're listening to at the beginning...one steady note in the strings hangs in the air; a harp creates an eerie music-box effect. A counter-melody joins soon after. A vague sense of menace threatens to overpower...The unsettling feeling doesn't last for long: it's resolved with the quietest of bassoons playing one suspended note transforming the moment into a quiet triumph and, the introduction of a familiar carol – The First Noel".

The recording used in the 1984 adaption was from a 1966 EMI recording (LP catalogue No. ESD 7021) featuring the Pro Arte Orchestra conducted by Barry Rose. Incidental music is by Roger Limb of the BBC Radiophonic Workshop using a combination of orchestral and synthesised instruments. Tom Urges notes that Limb's incidental music "adds to the heady mix of ancient and modern, of reality and fantasy, and builds on the atmosphere we are prepared for as viewers by one of the best choices of theme music in the history of British TV".

An extract featuring the "First Nowell" title segment was released as a single by BBC Records. A soundtrack album was released in December 2018 by Silva Screen Records (SILCD1547).

The Box of Delights

Soundtrack album by Roger Limb and the BBC Radiophonic Workshop
- Released: December 2018
- Genre: Soundtrack
- Label: Silva Screen

BBC Radiophonic Workshop chronology
Possum (2018)	The Box of Delights (2018)	The Stone Tape (2019)

Track listing

All tracks are written by Roger Limb, except where noted.

No.	Title	Length
1.	"The Box of Delights - Opening Titles"
2.	"The Time That Likings are Made"
3.	"A Warning of Wolves"
4.	"A Tosser to my Kick"
5.	"The White Rider"
6.	"Phoenix in the Fire"
7.	"Out of the Cold"
8.	"A Mountain in Switzerland"
9.	"Last Minute Christmas Shopping"
10.	"King Arthur's Camp"
11.	"King Arthur's Camp (reprise)"
12.	"King Arthur's Camp (continued)"
13.	"The Box of Delights"
14.	"Towards Dawn"
15.	"Scrobblers"
16.	"Snowman"
17.	"Herne the Hunter"
18.	"Go Small"
19.	"Go Swift"
20.	"That Boy"
21.	"In Darkest Cellars Underneath"
22.	"Lighting the Tree"
23.	"Kitchen Fugue / Here Comes the Posset"
24.	"Sweet Dreams"
25.	"On the Flood"
26.	"Over the Weir"
27.	"Return to Seekings"
28.	"Maria Scrobbled"
29.	"Kay and Peter Fly to the Chester Hills"
30.	"Peter Scrobbled"
31.	"A Dream"
32.	"Kay Returns to Chesters"
33.	"The Spider in the Web"
34.	"Our Final Plans"
35.	"The Key to All the Trouble"
36.	"The Boy with No Shadow"
37.	"Waterfall Boy"
38.	"Under my Hand"
39.	"Leave Us Not Little"
40.	"Slave of the Night"
41.	"Is it Near?"
42.	"Know Your Fate"
43.	"Nor Yet Dark"
44.	"The End of Abner Brown"
45.	"To Tatchester"
46.	"Christmas Eve"
47.	"Home for the Holidays"
48.	"The Box of Delights - Closing Titles"
49.	"Christmas Day In The Morning" (Richard Harvey)
50.	"Carol Symphony: Andante quasi lento e cantabile" (Victor Hely-Hutchinson; performed by Pro Arte Orchestra)

== Reception ==
The BBC TV production of The Box of Delights won three British Academy of Film & Television Arts awards (BAFTAs) and a Royal Television Society award. The series was nominated for five BAFTAs - for best Children's Programme, Video Cameraman, Graphics, Video Lighting and VTR Editor; and won three - for best Children's Programme, VTR Editor and Video Lighting. The Royal Television Society award was won for Technique, for Robin Lobb and the BBC Special Effects team.

In the mid-1980s the BBC made concerted efforts into making productions for international sale, and the success of The Box of Delights on PBS in the U.S. led to commissioning of further fantasy series, in particular The Chronicles of Narnia (1988–90).

In 2015, Radio Times magazine reported that amongst its audience:

The Box of Delights made a big impression on those who saw it when it originally aired more than three decades ago on BBC1. Mainly because it somehow managed to be the image of snowy Edwardian chocolate-box perfection, and pretty bloody creepy at the same time...The incidental music and special effects — while nostalgic for those who revere, say, Peter Davison-era Doctor Who — do seem dated to 21st-century kids dazzled by CGI. But the whole thing is carried off with such innovative spirit and charm that it really doesn't matter.

The children's author Piers Torday noted that the series was his first experience of "appointment to view" television, stating that "the early special effects in the style of Doctor Who were as stardust to my young eyes...It wasn't only the state-of-the-art animation and the compelling performances that captured my imagination, but also the magic of the story".

Simon Brew, reviewing the series for Den of Geek in 2011 was of the opinion that although dated in some respects, the festive atmosphere and story contribute to its continued appeal:

Inevitably, under greater scrutiny, it's not hard to see the Sellotape holding it all together in places. There's also a lull in the middle of the story that's hard to ignore, and cliffhangers that are barely worthy of the name. But there's also a strong drama, with surprisingly broad appeal here. It benefits from such a large cast...the ambition of the production, and the weaving in of practical effects, animation, and some computer work, is quite excellent...Most of all, though, it just works. It has a strange quality, in that it just feels so right, that it doesn't require being picked at and pulled apart. It is what it is, and in this case, that means it remains one of the most magical Yuletide dramas that the BBC has ever made.
