= Sard Harker =

Novel by John Masefield

- First edition (publ. Heinemann)
- Author: John Masefield
- Language: English
- Publication date: 1924

Sard Harker by John Masefield (1878–1967) is an adventure novel first published in October 1924. It is the first of three novels by Masefield set in the fictional nation of Santa Barbara in South America, the others are ODTAA and The Taking of the Gry.

== Plot summary ==
The novel begins with establishing narrative describing the fictional Santa Barbara as being geographically situated "far to leeward, with a coast facing to the north and east". Masefield moves on to describe the background of the protagonist, Chisholm Harker, called "Sard" Harker because he is "sardonic". He is the son of Chisholm Harker, Rector of Windlesham in Berkshire. The Rector died when Sard was 13 years old. Sard's mother remarried after having been widowed for two years, causing an estrangement that encourages Sard to go to sea.

The story opens in February 1897. Sard Harker is mate on a merchant vessel, the Pathfinder, under the command of Captain Carey, and is probably aged around 30. The ship is in the fictional port of Las Palomas. Ten years previously, on 18 March 1887, Sard was serving on another ship, the Venturer, in exactly the same harbour when he had a strange dream that he would meet a girl on the second of three visits to a white house called Los Xicales.

On the Pathfinder's final day in Las Palomas Captain Carey and Sard Harker watch a boxing match. During the match Sard overhears talk between two other spectators that suggests that a Mr Hilary Kingsborough and his sister will come to some harm. After the boxing match Sard goes off to warn the Kingsboroughs. By coincidence they are renting Los Xicales. The Kingsboroughs do not heed the warning and Sard leaves wondering if he has seen the girl his dream warned him about.

Sard, however, has little more than minutes to keep his passage on the Pathfinder. The adventure commences proper when Sard takes a wrong turning into a swamp and then sustains a stingray injury. He has by this time missed his passage and resolves to make his way to Santa Barbara. His endeavours result in his being assaulted and mugged, and put onto a freight train that takes him far inland. A long section of the novel is concerned with his ever more arduous journey across Santa Barbara, with minor characters and natural hazards endangering his life. Supernatural or starvation-induced hallucinations also feature on three occasions.

Sard is ultimately successful in reaching Santa Barbara, where he learns the fate of the Pathfinder.

The novel concludes with a confrontation with Sagrado B, a practitioner of black magic who wants Miss Kingsborough to complete one of his demonic rituals.

== Links to other novels ==
=== The Harker surname ===
The relationship between Chisholm Harker and the Kay Harker of The Midnight Folk and The Box of Delights is never made clear. In Sard Harker, Masefield explains that Lady Crowmarsh is Chisholm Harker's aunt, and in The Midnight Folk the Crowmarsh Estate is proximate to Seekings House, and the (evidently later) Lady Crowmarsh is on good terms with Kay's family. The Crowmarshes also play a minor role in Eggs and Baker, and are also in that novel situated near Condicote, Masefield's fictional name for his home town, Ledbury. In Sard Harker, however, Agatha, Lady Crowmarsh, is described as living in Berkshire. Further, the plot of The Midnight Folk revolves around the recovery of treasure lost by Captain Harker in Santa Barbara, but Captain Harker's name in The Midnight Folk is Aston Tirrold, not Chisholm, and is difficult to reconcile the dates.

=== Abner Brown ===
The confidence-trickster and gang member Abner Brown in Sard Harker may be the same man as the Abner Brown in The Midnight Folk and The Box of Delights. The latter is described in The Midnight Folk as being the grandson of an Abner Brown who was "the local gentleman who received things" in a South American port, and the son of yet another Abner Brown. Neither of the ancestral Abners can be the Abner Brown whom Sard Harker sees in 1897, as both were long dead by then (the grandfather in February 1850 and the father at some point around the same time), so if it is any of the three, it must be the grandson himself as a younger man. The Abner Brown of Sard Harker appears at first to be an old man, with a long white beard, but this is revealed to be a disguise and his true age is not given. Another connection is that the 1897 Abner Brown is working for Sagrado B, a black magician, and 1920s Abner Brown is himself the leader of a black magic coven. A family named Browne feature in The Taking of the Gry, including one of the founders of Santa Barbara's neighbouring country, Santa Ana.

=== Don Manuel ===
Don Manuel, the dictator of Santa Barbara from 1887 onward, is also the pivotal figure in ODTAA, although the plot is not described from his perspective. ODTAA functions as a prequel to Sard Harker, in the sense that it describes the events set out as the historical background to Sard Harker. The Dictator of Santa Barbara, unnamed but presumably intended to represent Don Manuel, accompanied by the Archbishop of Santa Barbara, visits London in The Midnight Folk, although this novel being set in 1885 is inconsistent with the timeline set out in Sard Harker. In The Taking of the Gry it becomes clear that Don Manuel has died some time before the setting of that book in 1911.

=== Santa Barbara ===
Santa Barbara features as a primary location in three of John Masefield's novels, Sard Harker, ODTAA and The Taking of the Gry, as well as being the origin of the treasure in The Midnight Folk. An illustrative map, entitled "The City of Santa Barbara", drawn by R. H. Sauter, is printed on the inside front and rear covers of the first British edition of The Taking of the Gry (1934), although it bears little resemblance to the geography described in Sard Harker.
