= Carol Symphony =

Symphony written by Victor Hely-Hutchinson

- by Victor Hely-Hutchinson
- Year: 1927
- Period: 20th-century classical music
- Genre: Symphony
- Form: Chorale prelude

Carol Symphony is a collection of four preludes, written by Victor Hely-Hutchinson in 1927. It is based on five Christmas carols, given additional orchestration and counterpoint arrangements. The four movements are written to be played uninterrupted consecutively.

== History ==
Carol Symphony was first performed by the Wireless Symphony Orchestra (the predecessor to the BBC Symphony Orchestra) on the BBC's 2LO radio station on 18 December 1927 conducted by John Barbirolli. The Radio Times describes the work thus:

The composer tells us that in this last work he has tried to express the spirit of joy which is called up by the memories of the romance and mystery of the manger. All the four Movements are based on Christmas tunes, and are played without break.

The First Movement, sedate in style and modelled closely on the Choral Preludes of Bach, treats the old tune we sing to O come, all ye faithful. The Second Movement, the Scherzo, alternates between slow and fast treatments of the carol-tune God rest you merry, gentlemen. The Third Movement, the composer says, is 'the real corn of the Symphony, and has a significance which should be clear from the tunes on which it is based, and from its character'. The airs are those of Lullay, lullay and The First Nowell, the latter being introduced as a kind of Trio (middle) section, and echoed again at the end. The Last Movement is full of rollicking joy. It is a fugue on the opening phrase of the whole work, which is interrupted now and again by Here we come a-wassailing and finally by O come, all ye faithful.

It was later performed at a promenade concert at the Queen's Hall which was broadcast live on the BBC's 2LO on 26 September 1929, with other music by Elgar, Vaughan Williams and Percy Pitt. It was conducted by the composer.

== Music ==
There are four movements:

1. Allegro energico
2. Allegro molto moderato
3. Andante quasi lento e cantabile
4. Allegro energico come prima

The first movement is based on "O Come, All Ye Faithful". It is in the style of a Bach chorale prelude.

The second movement is a scherzo on "God Rest Ye Merry, Gentlemen," similar to the Russian Balakirev compositions.

The third movement is a slow movement whose outer sections are based on the Coventry Carol, with a central interlude on "The First Nowell."

The finale recapitulates material from the first movement, and also uses "Here We Come A-wassailing" before concluding with a re-statement of "O Come, All Ye Faithful" similar to a style of Charles Villiers Stanford in a fugal structure.

== Usage as theme music ==
Two sections from the First Nowell section were used for the 1943 Children's Hour adaptation of John Masefield's The Box of Delights. The work was later used as the opening and closing titles of the 1984 BBC television adaptation of the same novel. It featured a recording conducted by Barry Rose in 1966 of the Pro Arte Orchestra at Guildford Cathedral. During World War II, the book had been adapted for radio on the BBC's Children's Hour, and Hely-Hutchinson's same music had been used. Hely-Hutchinson was the BBC's director of music from 1944 until his death in 1947.

During the 1940 and 1950s, the first movement was used to assist tuning into the BBC Home Service station before the start of the morning transmission during the Christmas period.

== Recordings ==
- Metropole Symphony Orchestra, Dolf van der Linden, recorded by Paxton Records (LPT 1002), reissued in 2015 by Guild 'Light Music' (GLCD 5233)
- Pro Arte Orchestra, Barry Rose, recorded by EMI in 1966 (HMV Classics and EMI)
- City of Prague Symphony Orchestra, Gavin Sutherland, recorded by Naxos in 2002 (NA 7099)
- Deutsche Radio Philharmonie, Pietari Inkinen, recorded by SWRmusic in 2022 (SWR19131CD)

== See also ==
- List of Christmas carols
