= The Box of Delights (play) =

2017 stage play

- Original language: English
- Written by: Piers Torday
- Based on: The Box of Delights by John Masefield
- Genre: Adventure; Drama; Fantasy

Premiere
- Date: 1 December 2017
- Place: Wilton's Music Hall, London

The Box of Delights is a play by Piers Torday based on the 1935 children's novel of the same name by John Masefield.

== Production history ==
The play made its world premiere at Wilton's Music Hall in London (in a co-production by Hero Productions) on 1 December 2017, running until 6 January 2018. The production was directed by Justin Audibert and designed by Tom Piper. The production returned the following year from 30 November 2018 until 5 January 2019.

A revival of the play produced by the Royal Shakespeare Company opened at the Royal Shakespeare Theatre. Stratford-upon-Avon on 31 October 2023, running until 7 January 2024 with the original creative team.

The Company of Ten produced the play at the Abbey Theatre in St Albans from 19 December 2025 until 28 December 2025, to critical acclaim.
