= The Taking of the Gry =

1934 novel by John Masefield

- First edition
- Author: John Masefield
- Genre: Adventure fiction
- Publisher: Heinemann (UK); The Macmillan Company (US)
- Publication date: 1934

The Taking of the Gry is a novel by John Masefield published in 1934, and set in the fictional Central or South American state of Santa Barbara, also the setting for Sard Harker (1924), ODTAA (1926), and part of The Midnight Folk (1927). The action of the novel takes place in 1911, some time after Don Manuel, the benevolent dictator in Sard Harker, has died.

== Synopsis ==
At the start of this adventure story, its narrator, the young seaman Charles Tarlton, has arrived in Santa Barbara and been recommended to take up the post of Fourth Officer on a crack trading ship. As he is being rowed over to it, he meets Tom Browne, a lieutenant in the Santa Ana navy to whom, he realises, he is distantly related. The two take to each other and Tarlton is saddened by the news later that his relative's ship, the flagship Almirante O'Duffy, does not manage to get away with the rest of the fleet when the navy rebels against Santa Ana's president in order to resist his plan to merge the republic with the neighbouring Santa Barbara.

Tarlton had imagined that Browne was shot as a rebel and so is surprised to spot his cousin on the quayside of Santa Barbara. In fact, he has managed to escape and is now keeping under observation The Gry, a ship with a vital load of arms destined for the Santa Ana navy but betrayed into the hands of the Santa Barbara authorities by its captain. Meanwhile Santa Barbara is being put on a war footing, a boom closes its harbour off and the naval police regularly patrol it. Browne's plans to capture The Gry and sail away with its cargo now seem impossible.

Tarlton, however, is a gifted pilot and remembers once reading about a hazardous channel, known as Drake's Passage, that provides an alternative escape route out of the harbour. He explores with the help of The Shining Branch, an English tugboat with a crew from Liverpool. He also persuades his cousin to dress up as an admiral and commandeer The Gry, with The Shining Branch to tow it away under cover of darkness and fog. Upon arrival at Puño, the Santa Ana naval base, Tarlton is then smuggled back over the frontier and returns to Santa Barbara without anyone being the wiser.
