= Charles Pears =

British artist

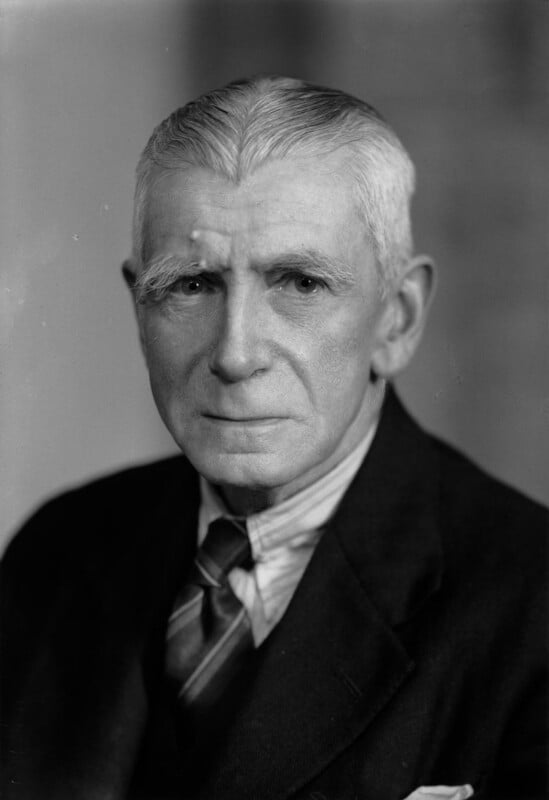
- Pears in 1948
- Born: 9 September 1873; Pontefract, Yorkshire
- Died: 28 January 1958 (aged 84); Truro, Cornwall
- Known for: Naval and marine art

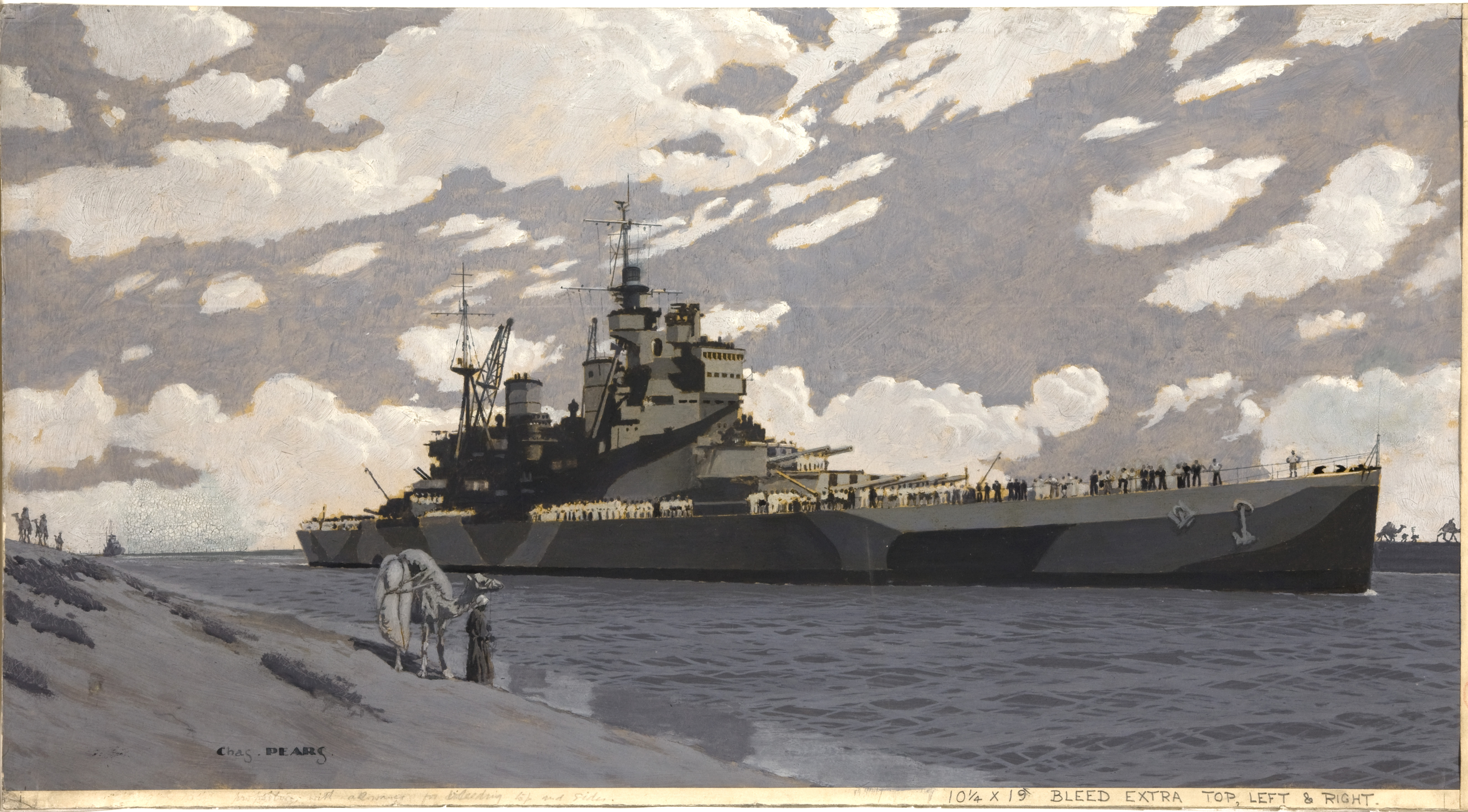
Battleship HMS Howe in Suez Canal by Charles Pears

Charles Pears RI ROI RSMA (9 September 1873 – 28 January 1958) was a British painter, illustrator and artist. His work was part of the art competitions at the 1928 Summer Olympics and the 1932 Summer Olympics.

== Biography ==
Born in Pontefract, Yorkshire, he studied nearby at East Hardwick and Pomfret College, where he started a lifelong appreciation of Canaletto. Active from 1890, he worked as an illustrator throughout his career. His early illustrated works were included in periodicals such as The Yellow Book, Punch, The Graphic and Salt-Water Poems and Ballads by John Masefield.

Pears is best known as a marine painter, where he often signed his work as Chas Pears. Pears was the first elected President of the Royal Society of Marine Artists. His works were exhibited from 1904 to 1939 in London having moved there, and he also wrote a number of books on small boat cruising.

A commissioned officer in the Royal Marines during the First World War, Pears worked also worked as an official War Artist during both the First and Second World Wars. His Second World War poster entitled "MV San Demetrio gets home" was issued by the Post Office Savings Bank, with the original artwork presently part of the collection of the National Maritime Museum.

From 1913 to 1936, Pears was a prolific poster artist, working for London Underground. He also created posters for the Empire Marketing Board, the Metropolitan Railway, Southern Railway, London, Midland & Scottish Railway, London & North Eastern Railway and Great Western Railway. He latterly created works for British Railways.

Pears moved to Saint Mawes, Cornwall in semi-retirement, and died in Truro on 28 January 1958.

Today his artworks are held in the collections of the London Transport Museum, National Maritime Museum, National Railway Museum, Imperial War Museum, and Tate. He is commemorated in a prize at the Royal Society of Marine Artists, the Charles Pears Memorial Award.

== Publications ==
- Toby and his Little Dog Tan (Hodder & Stoughton, 1903)
- From the Thames to the Seine (Chatto & Windus, London, 1910)
- From the Thames to the Netherlands: A Voyage in the Waterways of Zealand & Down the Belgian Coast (Chatto & Windus, London, 1914)
- South Coast Cruising – from the Thames to Penzance (Edward Arnold, London, 1931)
- Yachting on the Sunshine Coast (Southern Railway Company, 1932)
- Going Foreign (Edward Arnold, London, 1933)
