= Maria Jones =

Maria Jones may refer to:

- Maria Jones, character in Lovesick (British TV series)
- Maria Jones, fictional accomplice of Kay Harker

== See also ==
- Mariah Jones, fictional character
- Marie Jones
