= Walter Hely-Hutchinson =

British diplomat and colonial administrator (1849–1913)

The Right Honourable Sir Walter Hely-Hutchinson GCMG
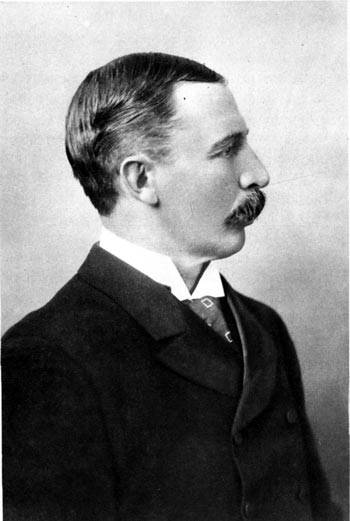
- Sir Walter Hely-Hutchinson

Governor of Cape Colony
- In office 9 January 1901 – 1910
- Monarchs: Queen Victoria; Edward VII
- Prime Minister: Sir Gordon Sprigg; Sir Leander Starr Jameson; John X. Merriman
- Preceded by: Sir William Butler
- Succeeded by: Sir Henry Jenner Scobell

Governor of Natal
- In office 1893–1901
- Monarch: Queen Victoria
- Preceded by: Francis Haden
- Succeeded by: Sir Henry Edward McCallum

Personal details
- Born: Walter Francis Hely-Hutchinson; 22 August 1849
- Died: 23 September 1913 (aged 64)
- Children: Victor Hely-Hutchinson
- Education: University of Cambridge
- Awards: Knight Grand Cross of the Order of St Michael and St George

Sir Walter Francis Hely-Hutchinson GCMG PC (22 August 1849 – 23 September 1913) was an Anglo-Irish diplomat and colonial administrator.

== Background and education ==
Hely-Hutchinson was the second son of Richard Hely-Hutchinson, 4th Earl of Donoughmore. He was educated at Cheam School, Harrow and Trinity College, Cambridge.

== Career ==
Hely-Hutchinson was a barrister of the Inner Temple, 1877; Private Secretary to Sir Hercules Robinson, Governor of New South Wales; for Fiji Affairs, 1874; for New South Wales, 1875; Colonial Secretary of Barbadoes, 1877; Chief Secretary to the Government of Malta, 1883; Lieutenant-Governor of Malta between 1884 and 1889, as Governor and Commander-in-Chief of the Windward Islands between 1889 and 1893 and as Governor and Commander-in-Chief of Natal and Zululand between 1893 and 1901 and Special Commissioner for Amatongaland. While in Natal he inaugurated the system of Responsible Government in Natal, and completed the annexation of the Trans-Pongola Territories, which form an integral part of Zululand.

He was appointed Governor of the Cape Colony in 1901, during the height of the Second Boer War in South Africa, and was the last British governor until the post disappeared when the colony joined the Union of South Africa in 1910. He also acted as High Commissioner for Southern Africa in 1909 during the absence of Lord Selborne. Following the end of the Boer war in June 1902, he was among those responsible for introducing the peace settlement in the colony. In November–December 1902 he made a month long tour of the Malmesbury, Saldanha Bay, Piquetberg, Clanwilliam, and Ceres districts. The following month, he welcomed the British Colonial Secretary, Joseph Chamberlain, during his tour of South Africa.

Hely-Hutchinson was awarded the honorary degree of Doctor of Law (LL.D.) by the University of Edinburgh and was invested as a Knight Grand Cross of the Order of St. Michael and St. George. He was invested as a Privy Counsellor; thus he was styled The Rt. Hon.

== Family ==
Hely-Hutchinson married in 1881 May Justice, the daughter of Major-General William Clive Justice, CMG, commanding British troops in Ceylon. They had seven children:

- John Walter Hely Hutchinson b. 14 Jan 1882, d. 11 Sep 1955
- Violet La Vallette Hely Hutchinson b. 26 Jul 1883, d. 11 Dec 1883
- Christopher Douglas Hely Hutchinson b. 30 Jan 1885, d. 7 Nov 1958, earned the Military Cross during World War I and was president of the British South Africa Company
- Maurice Robert Hely Hutchinson b. 22 May 1887, d. 11 Feb 1961, Member of Parliament (MP) for Hastings
- Jocelyn Frederick Osbert Hely Hutchinson b. 17 Jul 1891, d. 18 Jan 1893
- Natalie Leila Margaret Hely Hutchinson b. 5 Aug 1894, d. 1981; married the archaeologist and administrator Gerard Mackworth Young.
- Christian Victor Noel Hope Hely Hutchinson b. 28 Dec 1901, d. 11 Mar 1947, composer and musician. He was discovered to be a child prodigy as a toddler when he could vocally mimic the notes his mother played on the piano.

Diplomatic posts
Preceded by Sir William Palmer, 2nd Earl of Selborne	British High Commissioner to South Africa; 1909	Succeeded by Sir David Murray Anderson
Government offices
Preceded by Sir Walter Sendall	Governor of the Windward Islands; 1889–1892	Succeeded by Sir Charles Bruce
Preceded by Francis Haden	Governor of Natal; 1893–1901	Succeeded by Sir Henry McCallum
Preceded by Sir William Butler	Governor of Cape Colony; 1901–1910	Succeeded by Sir Henry Scobell
