= In Prison =

1915 song by Frederick Keel

In Prison is a 1915 song by composer Frederick Keel, composed in 1915 in the civilian Ruhleben internment camp on the former racecourse in Berlin where Keel was interned along with other artists and musicians including Edgar Bainton, Ernest MacMillan, Leigh Henry and Benjamin Dale. The text is from A Good Knight In Prison, or simply In Prison by William Morris from The Defence of Guenevere, and Other Poems 1858.

William Morris In Prison: "Wearily, drearily, half the day long, flap the great banners, high over the stone. Strangely and eerily, sounds the wind's song, bending the banner-poles..."

The song In Prison, and the choice of text, is part of the musical testimony to Keel's activity as organizer and chair of the Ruhleben Music Society, consisting of 36 prisoners; the group's concerts were subsequently reported in the Times for 30 January 1919. Among other works of the Music Society Bainton also wrote his String Quartet in A major and MacMillan also a string quartet.

== Publication, 1921 ==
The song was published and copyrighted by Keel in 1921 as part of Two Songs, the first Longing to words of Matthew Arnold and the second In Prison.

Matthew Arnold Longing: "Come to me in my dreams, and then by day I shall be well again...

== Recordings ==
In Prison was recorded among tenor Robin Tritschler and pianist Malcolm Martineau's 2014 collection of songs for the 100th anniversary of the outbreak of the First World War entitled No Exceptions, No Exemptions on Signum Records, November 2014.
