= Poetry Association of Scotland =

The Poetry Association of Scotland (or PAS), formerly known as the Scottish Association for the Speaking of Verse, is a public, membership-based literary society founded in 1924 principally by John Masefield, along with other figures such as Marion Angus and Hugh MacDiarmid.

Masefield was the first president of the association; he gave an address entitled "With the living voice" to the inaugural general meeting in Edinburgh on 24 October 1924, and characterised poetry read aloud as "irresistible". Masefield's address was published in book form in 1925. One of the society's primary initial aims, according to Masefield, was improving the teaching of poetry in schools. In addition to the Edinburgh branch, a Glasgow branch was inaugurated in 1924; the Glasgow Musical Festival's elocution competitions are cited in one newspaper report as the main reason for the interest in poetry reading across Scotland. By 1926 branches had also been formed in Aberdeen and Perth; the association was then "recommended by a formidable array of distinguished names", with every professor of English across Scotland said to number among its vice-presidents.

In the mid-1920s and 1930 the association gave radio broadcasts. A leading member in the early years was Eric Lyall. A recital by W. H. Auden in the 1970s in Edinburgh was recalled as an inspiration by Alexander McCall Smith.

In its present form, the Association, which is a registered charity, runs an annual series of monthly poetry readings featuring invited poets from both Scottish and international circuits, as well as regular talks on poetry-related topics by distinguished speakers, including its biennial Hugh MacDiarmid Lecture. The Association's events in recent years have generally, though not exclusively, been held in the Scottish Poetry Library in Edinburgh.

Although a single-tier organisation today, in past decades the Association had multiple area branches throughout Scotland.

== Post holders ==
The following comprises only a partial and non-consecutive list of most recent names:

Honorary presidents

- Douglas Dunn
- Edwin Morgan
- Norman MacCaig
- Hugh MacDiarmid

Chair

- Joyce Caplan
- Norman Kreitman
- Peter France

Secretaries

- Mario Relich
- Robin Bell
- Deric Bolton
