= May Hely-Hutchinson =

British novelist

- Born: 1861
- Died: 15 November 1938 (aged 76–77)
- Occupation: Novelist
- Spouse(s): Walter Hely-Hutchinson
- Children: 7, including Maurice Robert Hely Hutchinson and Christian Victor Noel Hope Hely Hutchinson
- Parent(s): W. Clive-Justice

May, Lady Hely-Hutchinson (née Justice; 1861 – 15 November 1938) was a British novelist.

May Justice was born in 1861, the daughter of Major General William Clive Justice. In 1881, she married Sir Walter Hely-Hutchison, son of Richard Hely-Hutchinson, 4th Earl of Donoughmore.

In 1900, she published her only novel, Monica Grey.

Her husband was appointed Governor of the Cape Colony in 1901. In 1902, she published the article "Female Emigration to South Africa", where she bluntly and at length complained about the quality of available domestic servants:

[...] each class has its allotted duties, and the woman who deliberately neglects or ignores the more delicate or involved social duties of her class is quite as blameworthy as the servant who, instead of attending to her duties, spends what she considers her own, but what is really her mistress's time, in gazing out of a window or reading a 'penny dreadful.'

May Hely-Hutchinson died on 15 November 1938.

== Children ==
May and Walter Hely-Hutchison had seven children:

- John Walter Hely Hutchinson b. 14 Jan 1882, d. 11 Sep 1955
- Violet La Vallette Hely Hutchinson b. 26 Jul 1883, d. 11 Dec 1883
- Christopher Douglas Hely Hutchinson b. 30 Jan 1885, d. 7 Nov 1958, earned the Military Cross during World War I and was president of the British South Africa Company
- Maurice Robert Hely Hutchinson b. 22 May 1887, d. 11 Feb 1961, Member of Parliament (MP) for Hastings
- Jocelyn Frederick Osbert Hely Hutchinson b. 17 Jul 1891, d. 18 Jan 1893
- Natalie Leila Margaret Hely Hutchinson b. 5 Aug 1894, d. 1981
- Christian Victor Noel Hope Hely Hutchinson b. 28 Dec 1901, d. 11 Mar 1947, composer and musician. He was discovered to be a child prodigy as a toddler when he could vocally mimic the notes his mother played on the piano.

== Bibliography ==
- Monica Grey. 1 vol. London: John Murray, 1900.
