= Salt-Water Poems and Ballads =

1916 poetry collection by John Masefield

- Author: John Masefield
- Illustrator: Charles Pears
- Genre: Poetry
- Publisher: Macmillan
- Publication date: 1916

Salt-Water Poems and Ballads is a book of poetry on themes of seafaring and maritime history by British future Poet Laureate John Masefield. It was first published in 1916 by Macmillan, with illustrations by Charles Pears. The collection includes "Sea-Fever" and "Cargoes", two of Masefield's best known poems.

Many of the poems had been published in Masefield's earlier collections, Salt-Water Ballads (1902), Ballads (1903) and Ballads and Poems (1910). They were included in The Collected Poems of John Masefield, published by Heinemann in 1923.

== "Sea-Fever" ==
"Sea-Fever" first appeared in Salt-Water Ballads, Masefield's first volume of poetry, published in 1902 in London by Grant Richards.

The first line differed slightly from the usual later form:

I must down to the seas again, to the lonely sea and the sky,
And all I ask is a tall ship and a star to steer her by,
And the wheel's kick and the wind's song and the white sail's shaking,
And a grey mist on the sea's face and a grey dawn breaking.

In The Collected Poems of John Masefield, the opening line was changed to the text now more commonly anthologised: "I must go down to the sea again, to the lonely sea and the sky". The first lines of the second and third stanzas retained the form "I must down to the seas again [...]".

== "Cargoes" ==
"Cargoes" first appeared in Ballads – Masefield's second volume of poetry, published in 1903 in London by Charles Elkin Mathews.

Quinquereme of Nineveh from distant Ophir
Rowing home to haven in sunny Palestine,
With a cargo of ivory,
And apes and peacocks,
Sandalwood, cedarwood, and sweet white wine.

== Musical settings ==
"Sea-Fever" has been set to music by many composers, including John Coventry, on his EP "The Roots of Folk Volume 2" and Patrick Clifford on his album American Wake. The most famous version is by John Ireland. The poem has also been set for boys' emerging voices in a score by Oliver Tarney, published by Oxford University Press, and by Kavisha Mazzella, a Western Australia-born musician and artist. Andy Vine, a Welsh-born Canadian folk musician, has also set the words to a folk melody of his own invention.

English composer Frederick Keel (1871-1954) set three of the poems for voice and piano in his 1919 collection Three Salt-Water Ballads: "Port of Many Ships", "Trade Winds" and "Mother Carey".

== Cultural references ==
- "Sea-Fever" is quoted by Willy Wonka in the 1971 film Willy Wonka & the Chocolate Factory.
- In the 60 minute TV special Disney's Living Seas (1986), Simon Le Bon of Duran Duran talked about Drum, and recited the poem "Sea-Fever" by John Masefield.
- The poem is quoted in part by Captain James T. Kirk in both the Star Trek: The Original Series episode "The Ultimate Computer" (1968) and the film Star Trek V: The Final Frontier (1989). It is also quoted in the 2004 film Sky Captain and the World of Tomorrow.
- The line "All I ask is a tall ship and a star to steer her by" is quoted on the ship plaque of the USS Defiant in Star Trek: Deep Space Nine. In the episode "Little Green Men", Quark paraphrases the same line: "All I ask is a tall ship, and a load of contraband to fill her up with."
- The sailor Sir Peter Blake's headstone, at Warblington Cemetery, near Emsworth on the south coast of England, bears the first stanza of "Sea-Fever".
- "Sea-Fever" is also recited during the Last Supper scene in the 12-hour Facebook Live event episode of The Third Day (TV series), "Part 2: Autumn" (2020).
- "Sea-Fever" is quoted by a character from the video game Subnautica 2 (2026). The game describes a psychotic disease for which John Masefield is the namesake.
