= John Keir Cross =

Scottish author and scriptwriter

John Keir Cross (19 August 1914 – 22 January 1967) was a Scottish author and scriptwriter who did most of his work for BBC radio and television. He also wrote science fiction and fantasy novels.

In early life, he was an insurance clerk who took to the road as a ventriloquist and busker. He published an autobiography when he was 22.

== Early life ==
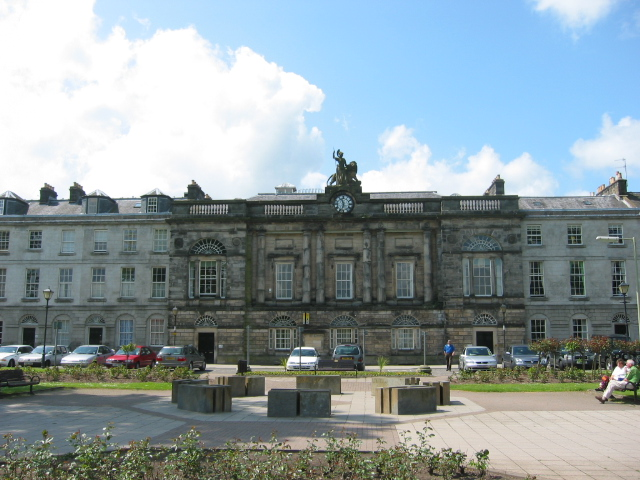
The old Perth Academy

Born at Carluke in Scotland in 1914, and brought up in Perth by his parents, Mr and Mrs Hugh A. Cross of 22 Muirton Bank, Perth, Cross was the son of a dentist, the grandson of a schoolmaster also called John Keir Cross, and a descendant of Henry Bell, an engineer. His grandfather, headmaster of the Coltness Iron Works School and also a composer, had died in 1900.

Cross was educated at Perth Academy, which he left in the summer of 1931, aged sixteen. In his last school term, he won a Perth schools musical prize for "Pianoforte (Preparatory Division)". After leaving the academy, where he edited a magazine, Cross's ambition was to be an actor, but he lacked training, for which he had no money, and he also found no openings. He took a job as a clerk at the Head Office in Perth of the General Accident Fire and Life Assurance Corporation. Wearying of this, he took to the road on a bicycle as a travelling ventriloquist, with a puppet called Joey. In May 1933, when he was still eighteen, the Perthshire Advertiser noted that the young Cross was "well-known in the county as a very clever ventriloquist." Cross also appeared in amateur theatre and in December 1933 was in a Perth Lyric Society play about Prince Charlie and Flora MacDonald, playing the part of the prince's friend Captain O'Neal.

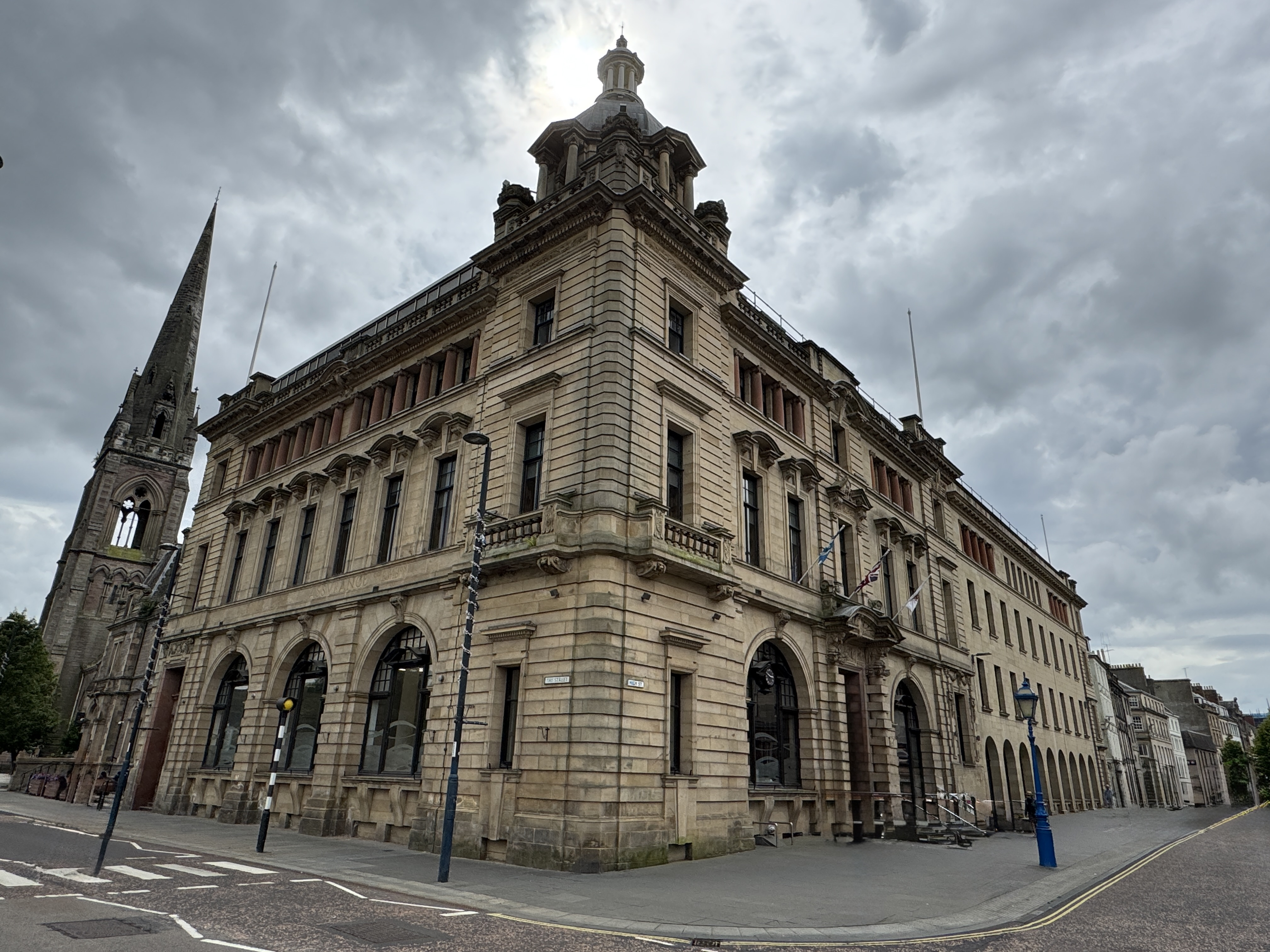
The General Accident building, Perth

== Career ==
Having lived for a time as a tramp and busker, Cross began his writing career in Scottish journalism. He came to the attention of the BBC, and his first work to be broadcast was a musical play, for which Cross wrote both the words and the music. In August 1936, Scottish newspapers noted the forthcoming production of the work, "Penny Coloured", and that the writer was "formerly well known in amateur theatricals in Perth". The Perthshire Advertiser noted that Cross had left Perth for London about a year before that.

Cross's book Aspect of Life, about his life on the road, appeared in print in February 1937 and got enthusiastic reviews, with the Daily Mirror saying "Ventriloquial Tramp John Keir Cross has certainly had a more original and adventurous life than most young men who write their autobiographies at the age of twenty-two." The Birmingham Weekly Mercury began with "Mr Cross is a very entertaining young man, superlatively erudite within the limitations of his age."

After the success of his first book, in 1937 Cross was taken onto the entertainment staff of the BBC. He was the producer of Children's Hour from 1941 to at least 1944. In May 1946 he was reported to be leaving his job at the BBC.

Apart from his work as a BBC scriptwriter and producer, Cross wrote science fiction and fantasy novels for young readers, using his own name and also the nom-de-plume of Stephen MacFarlane, and a small number of novels for adults. Some of his work is still in print, and his publisher says that his best known work is Other Passenger (1944), a collection of short stories for adults. In the field of horror fiction, Cross edited anthologies of other writers' work, such as Best Horror Stories (1956), Best Black Magic Stories (1960).

In 1962, Cross was reported to be joining The Archers, a long-running radio drama series about country life, as a scriptwriter. He commented that Ambridge was very much like his own village in South Devon and Brookfield was just like his own farm.

== Personal life ==
Cross married Audrey Blair, one of the daughters of Ethelbert William Blair, and was noted in 1951 to be "living in London with his wife and family". A son, Julian Blair Keir Cross, was born in October 1951 in Wood Green, Middlesex.

Cross died in January 1967, at home, Brushford, Diptford, Devon, and his funeral was at the Torquay Crematorium. The newspapers reported that he was one of the scriptwriters for The Archers and that members of the cast were at the funeral, but did not give a cause of death.

The house at Brushford had a third of a mile of one bank of the River Avon, including the fishing rights, and a water-meadow. It was near the Gara Bridge railway station, which closed in 1963. Cross left a will and an estate valued at £294 (equivalent to £4,685 in 2025). Probate was granted to his widow, Audrey Emily Keir Cross.

Cross's son Julian Keir-Cross died in 1974, aged 22. In 1970, his widow had married secondly Major Peter Duguid Heath Stock MC. She was widowed a second time in 1999, and died as Audrey Emily Stock in 2013.

== As John Keir Cross ==
- Aspect of Life: An Autobiography of Youth (London: Selwyn & Blount, 1937)
- The Angry Planet (London: Peter Lunn, 1945, illustrated by Robin Jacques)
- Jack Robinson (1945, illustrated by John Parson)
- The Other Passenger: 18 Strange Stories (London: John Westhouse, 1946, illustrated by Bruce Angrave)
- The Owl and the Pussycat: a strange story for children (London: Peter Lunn, 1946, illustrated by Robin Jacques)
- The Other Side of Green Hills (New York: Coward McCann, 1947)
- The White Magic (London: John Westhouse, 1947)
- The Man in Moonlight: the Tale of a Twice Lost Cause (London: John Westhouse, 1947, illustrated by Robin Jacques)
- "The Drawings of Robin Jacques", in Alphabet and Image 7, May 1948, pp. 33-45
- The Children's Omnibus, compiled by John Keir Cross, ed. (London: Peter Lunn, 1948, an anthology, illustrated by H. M. Brock)
- "Three Ghosts", in Collins for Boys and Girls, 13 January 1949
- Blackadder: A Tale of the Days of Nelson (London: Collins, 1950)
- Glory (London: Werner Laurie, 1951; new paperback edition as Mistress Glory by Corgi, 1960)
- The Flying Fortunes in an Encounter with Rubberface! (London: Frederick Muller, 1952)
- Juniper Green: the loves of a tempestuous raven-haired temptress (London: 1952; new paperback edition by Panther, 1962)
- SOS from Mars (London: Hutchinson, 1954)
- The Red Journey Back (1954)
- The Dancing Tree (London: Hutchinson, 1955)
- Best Horror Stories, ed. (London: Faber and Faber, 1956)
- Best Black Magic Stories, ed. (London: Faber and Faber, 1960)
- Stories from The Other Passenger (1961)
- Best Horror Stories 2, ed. (London: Faber and Faber, 1965)

== As Stephen MacFarlane ==
- Studio 'J' Investigates: a spy story for children (London: Peter Lunn, 1944)
- Lucy Maroon, the Car that Loved a Policeman (London: John Westhouse, 1944)
- Mr Bosanko and Other Stories (London: Peter Lunn, 1944)
- Detectives in Greasepaint (London: Peter Lunn, 1946)
- The Stolen Sphere: An Adventure and a Mystery (1953)

== Radio scripts ==
- The Wind in the Willows, a play based on the book by Kenneth Graham (BBC Home Service, October 1944)
- "The Big Family", a radio impression of the city of Perth.
- "Four Years: Experiences of a prisoner of war of the Japanese" (Scottish Home Service, Friday 28 March 1947, from autobiographical material supplied by James J. Ferguson, a Scottish schoolmaster
- The Archers (BBC Light Programme, 1950s)
- An Army with Banners, radio play (February 1968), produced after his death

== Selected radio adaptations ==
- The Box of Delights for Children's Hour (1943)
- 'Oh, Whistle, and I'll Come to You, My Lad' for BBC radio, 1949
- The Man in Black, in eight episodes, BBC Radio, 1949
- "The Adventure of the Blue Carbuncle" for BBC radio, 1954
- The African Queen, radio play from the novel by C. S. Forester (November 1956)
- A Tale of Two Cities, BBC television series adapted from Dickens in seven episodes (4 August to 15 September 1957)
- The Midnight Folk adapted from John Masefield's book in five parts for Children's Hour (1958)
- Fire, Burn!, from John Dickson Carr's thriller (July 1958)
- The Kraken Wakes for BBC Home Service

== For television ==
- The Mystery of Edwin Drood, an eight-part serial based on Dickens’s unfinished novel (STV, from 28 September 1960)
- Sir Francis Drake for television, 1961
