= The Everlasting Mercy =

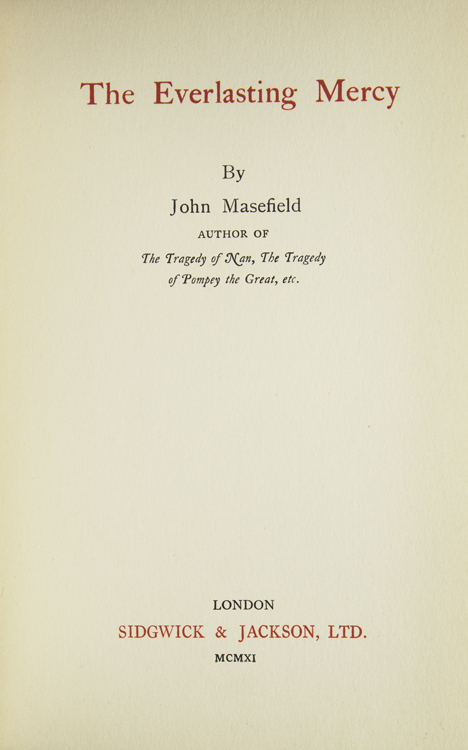
Cover of the first edition

The Everlasting Mercy is a poem by John Masefield, the UK's second longest serving poet laureate after Alfred, Lord Tennyson.

It was published in 1911 and is styled as the confession of a man who has turned from sin to Christianity. As a work that first made Masefield famous, it shocked early 20th-century British sensibilities with its direct, honest, and therefore often harsh language, as the life of protagonist violent, drunken womanizer Saul Kane is laid out in detail.

== In Popular Media ==
In the third episode of the American TV series Peter Gunn, The Vicious Dog, the last line is the antagonist's, asked why he'd committed the crimes, responding with a quote from The Everlasting Mercy:

O Lord, the sin Done for things there's money in.

The poem is also mentioned in William Gaddis’s “The Recognitions”. One of the characters is reading a book of poetry by John Masefield while on the deck of a boat as it passes the Rock of Gibraltar.
