= Frederick Keel =

British composer (1871–1954)

James Frederick Keel (8 May 1871 – 9 August 1954) was an English composer of art songs, baritone singer and academic. Keel was a successful recitalist and a professor of singing at the Royal Academy of Music. He combined scholarly and artistic interest in English songs and their history. His free settings of Elizabethan and Jacobean lyrics helped pioneer the revival of interest in the genre. He was also an active member of the English folksong movement. During World War I, Keel was held in the civilian internment camp at Ruhleben in Germany, where he played an active role in the camp's musical life, giving many recitals to help boost the morale of his fellow detainees. Keel was one of the few singer-songwriters of English art songs of his day. Among his better-known compositions are settings of Salt-Water Ballads by the poet John Masefield, including "Trade Winds", the popularity of which has given Keel a reputation for being a "one-song composer".

== Biography ==
=== Early life, education and singing career ===
Frederick Keel was born in London on 8 May 1871, the eldest son of James Frederick and Mary Anne Keel. He attended Wells Cathedral School. After teaching in several preparatory schools, in 1895 he enrolled at the Royal Academy of Music (RAM) where he studied singing with Frederick King and Frederick Walker, and composition with Frederick Corder. Keel further pursued his training as a singer with Federico Blasco in Milan in 1896, before moving to Munich the following year to complete his studies with Eugen Gura. Keel's London debut was at the Queen's Hall in 1898. His pleasant baritone voice and singing style made him a popular recitalist in the pre-war years.

=== Folk Song Society ===
While in Munich that Keel became fascinated by folk music, an interest which blossomed on his return to England where he was able to meet fellow enthusiasts such as Lucy Broadwood, J A Fuller Maitland and, eventually, Cecil Sharp. Keel first joined the Folk Song Society in 1905 and became its Honorary Secretary between 1911 and 1919. He also edited various issues of the society journal, especially when Lucy Broadwood was unavailable. In 1948, long after standing down, Keel published a brief history of the society, charting events since its inception in 1898. As a singer, Keel had a vast repertoire folk songs, which he regularly drew on in his recitals. By contrast, Keel's fieldwork was not particularly extensive: apart from noting down a couple of London street cries his collecting activity seems to have been largely confined to a clutch of folk songs from Hindhead and Haslemere in Surrey, identified and notated in 1913 with the collaboration of fellow society members Clive Carey and Iolo Aneurin Williams. Keel did also edit sets noted down by others, including a collection titled Folk songs from Scotland and 'cries' from Kent (1944).

=== Elizabethan love songs ===
Keel's interest in traditional and early music was both historical and artistic. Acquaintance with A H Bullen's anthologies of Elizabethan lyrics sparked a lasting musical and literary interest. This fascination led Keel to publish in 1909 and 1913 respectively two sets of his own free arrangements for piano and (low or high) voice of late Tudor and early Jacobean lute songs under the title Elizabethan love songs. Keel's arrangements were based on compositions by John Dowland, Thomas Campion, Thomas Morley, Philip Rosseter and Tobias Hume, among others. His initiative was to be roundly criticised by fellow art song composer and early music enthusiast Philip Heseltine (Peter Warlock), who deplored Keel's use of the piano and disregard for the original tablature. Nevertheless, Keel's composerly transcriptions helped popularise an area of early music which, at the time, was seldom performed. Seven arrangements by Keel were later selected for inclusion in a musical play by Hilda Wilson entitled Nymphs and Shepherds (published 1930), which showcased some contemporary settings of Elizabethan and Jacobean songs.

Keel complemented his arrangement work with an essay titled Music in the Time of Queen Elizabeth in which he succinctly outlined his understanding of the social, literary and musicological context of Elizabethan vocal and instrumental music, focusing mainly on the songs and dances. This 60 page booklet was privately printed in a limited edition in 1914 by the Sette of Odd Volumes, an elite bibliophile dining club dedicated to mutual admiration, of which he would later become President ("His Oddship"). (Note: Keel, The Singer, joined the Sette of Odd Volumes in 1909, became Secretary in 1913, and was made President for the year 1921. A society cartoon, dated 1922, humorously depicts the miniaturist singer-songwriter dressed as Napoleon while nonchalantly leaning on a bust of Wagner, affecting a conqueror's pose.) Keel, who at the time was "Singer and Secretary to Ye Sette", had presented Music in the Time of Queen Elizabeth as an after dinner address illustrated by a few of his own settings. (Note: Music in the Time of Queen Elizabeth concludes with a brief discussion of the dance repertoire, including popular dances such as the Morris and the Hey, both of which Keel links to contemporary observations by Cecil Sharpe.)

=== Life in Ruhleben, 1914–1918 ===
The outbreak of World War I found Keel and his family on holiday in Bavaria. Keel himself was arrested and became one of several notable musicians detained at the Ruhleben internment camp near Berlin, where he immediately found himself sharing barracks with fellow composer and RAM colleague Benjamin Dale. The two later jointly sent an open letter to Alexander Mackenzie, Principal of the RAM, listing forty-two of the musicians detained there and outlining musical activities in Ruhleben at the time, including educational programmes for fellow prisoners. In the summer of 1915, Keel had been elected to chair the committee of the newly formed Ruhleben Music Society, which oversaw the camp's burgeoning musical life. Keel is said to have been by far the most popular singer in the camp, performing a wide repertoire of songs, including his own, at numerous concerts until his eventual release in March 1918. (Note: According to composer and fellow detainee, Edgar Bainton, "if a referendum had been taken for the most beloved singer, the choice would beyond all doubt have fallen on Mr Frederick Keel, the esteemed Professor of the Royal Academy of Music. Mr Keel sang at the first concert ever given at Ruhleben, and from that time his services were always in demand. He had a most amazing repertory. During the three and a half years of his internment he must have sung literally hundreds of songs, the best songs of all languages, but more particularly his own, which naturally endeared him to the vast proportion of the prisoners [...]. Perhaps Mr Keel's greatest successes were in the domain of folk-songs, of which he seemed to have an illimitable storehouse.") Keel also penned an informal account of his arrest and imprisonment, titled Life in Ruhleben, 1914–1918. Privately printed for the Sette of Odd Volumes, it provides a sketch of how this sizeable community of civilian prisoners, who had been crammed into wet and dirty stables, eventually came to organise their own "University" facilities. During his internment, Keel set William Morris's poem 'In Prison' (1915), as well as 'Tomorrow' (1918), one of John Masefield's Salt Water Ballads. (Note: Lewis Foreman believes that "in view of the fact that there were comparatively few patriotic or belligerent settings made in the camp, we may perhaps best remember Keel at Ruhleben for his bluff treatment of 'Tomorrow'". This song enjoyed a certain vogue at the BBC Proms after the war, being programmed nine times, including three different performances in 1919 alone. Elsewhere, it was also programmed in a morale boosting context during World War II.)

=== Salt-Water Ballads and other songs ===
After the Ruhleben experience, Keel no longer held recitals but he did continue in his role as a Professor of Singing at the Royal Academy of Music, a post which he had taken up before the war and retained until his eventual retirement in 1939. In 1919, Keel published his settings of Three Salt-Water Ballads (1919) by John Masefield, including the once highly popular "Trade Winds". In addition to several other Masefield settings from Salt-Water Ballads and elsewhere, Keel wrote songs to words by various British poets, including Shakespeare, de la Mare, Hardy and Tennyson.

=== Family ===
In 1902 Keel married Dora Compton, the second daughter of the English-born German landscape painter and mountain climber, Edward Theodore Compton. The couple, who eventually went to live at Fridland, near Bethersden in Kent, had a son and two daughters. Keel died on 9 August 1954 at the age of 83.

== Style and reputation ==
Keel was one of the few art song singer-songwriters of his day. (Note: Keel's status as an early twentieth century singer-songwriter of English art songs is rare. In his study From Parry to Finzi: Twenty English Song-Composers (2002) Trevor Hold includes Keel in a checklist of 117 such composers; at the start of the book, he declares that "the days of the singer-songwriter, in the art song at least, are long gone".) However, he composed only a relatively small body of original work. Indeed, the popular success of "Trade Winds" has given Keel a reputation for being a "one-song composer". Nevertheless, Keel's other Salt Walter Ballads settings used to enjoy considerable popularity, with one critic finding them "almost perfect". Noting Keel's preference for minor keys, another contemporary critic remarked on the "lively gait" of his melodies which made them sound as bright as in the major. Keel's unsigned obituary in The Times spoke of his compositions as being "graceful and melodious rather than robust or profound". In their heyday, Keel's songs were well represented on record, but the number of available recordings has shrunk. (Note: One well received record included six of the Elizabethan love songs sung by Dora Labbette in arrangements with string quartet accompaniment.) Currently, Three Salt Water Ballads can be heard on a recording sung by Bryn Terfel with piano accompaniment by Malcolm Martineau. "Trade Winds" can also be heard on CD, as sung by Jonathan Lemalu accompanied by Roger Vignoles.

== Notes and references ==
Notes
