= 1892 Natal parliamentary election =

Elections to the Legislative Council were held in the Colony of Natal in September 1892. The initial result was a victory for the anti-responsible government party, which won 14 of the 24 seats. However, this was later overturned as four anti-responsible government members lost their seats after their election was annulled, and the by-elections were won by pro-responsible government candidates.

== Background ==
The Legislative Council was dissolved on 22 August 1892 following the submission of a report for the Council on the Bill for Establishing Responsible Government of Natal. The elections were contested entirely on whether to accept the bill or not. The basis of opposition to the bill was the claim that it gave full control over the black population to the Crown, and the counter-claim that it did not put the black population under the control of the British government.

== Results ==
Party	Seats	+/–
Anti-responsible government	14	+4
Pro-responsible government	10	–4
Total	24	0
Source: The Times

== Aftermath ==
The new Legislative Council was opened on 7 October 1892. In response to the speech of Governor Charles Mitchell, the Council passed a response by 14 votes to nine stating that the election results showed that the colony did not wish for responsible government and that the Council would not consider it. The decision was accepted by Mitchell.

In November, the election results of four members of the Anti group in Newcastle and Weenen were annulled for violations of the ballot act, with one Newcastle member, Green, declared to be an alien. In the Weenen by-election in December, two pro-responsible government members were elected. The Newcastle by-election was scheduled for January, but was delayed due to the accidental destruction of the ballot papers. In the eventual contest, two more pro-responsible government members were elected in the Newcastle by-election, giving the group a four-seat majority.

On 4 July Mitchell proclaimed a new constitution, granting the colony responsible government. As a result, fresh elections were held.
