= 1937 Hastings by-election =

UK Parliamentary by-election

The 1937 Hastings by-election was held on 24 November 1937. The by-election was held due to the resignation of the incumbent Conservative MP, Eustace Percy. It was won by the Conservative candidate Maurice Hely-Hutchinson.

Hastings by-election, 1937
| Party | Candidate | Votes | % | ±% |
|---|---|---|---|---|
| Conservative | Maurice Hely-Hutchinson | 18,428 | 62.1 | −6.9 |
| Labour | W W Wood | 11,244 | 37.9 | +6.9 |
| Majority | | 7,184 | 24.2 | −13.8 |
| Turnout | | 29,672 | 65.3 | −1.2 |
| Conservative hold | | Swing | | |
