= Maurice Hely-Hutchinson =

British politician (1887–1961)

Maurice Robert Hely-Hutchinson MC MP (22 May 1887 – 11 February 1961) was a Conservative Party politician in England.

He was elected as member of parliament (MP) for Hastings in East Sussex at a by-election in 1937. He held the seat until the 1945 general election, when he stood down from Parliament. During The Great Depression Hely-Hutchinson caused some controversy when he remarked that the long-term unemployed should lose the right to vote.

His parents were Sir Walter Hely-Hutchinson, Governor of the Cape Colony, and May Hely-Hutchinson.

He was married to Melita Keppel, daughter of Admiral Sir Colin Richard Keppel.

Parliament of the United Kingdom
Preceded by Lord Eustace Percy	Member of Parliament for Hastings; 1937 – 1945	Succeeded by Neill Cooper-Key
