= William Clive-Justice =

British Army general (1835-1908)

Major-General William Clive Justice CMG (16 April 1835 – 19 November 1908) was a British Army officer.

== Career ==
Having served the 75th Regiment of Foot, he was the Assistant Adjutant and Quartermaster of the West Indies and Officer Commanding the British Troops in Ceylon from 1893 to 1897.

He was also Senior Military Officer in command of Her Majesty's Regular Troops in Jamaica replacing Colonel Somerset Molyneux Wiseman-Clarke some time after 1884 till 1889, when he was replaced by Wilsone Black, C.B

== Family ==
- His daughter May Clive-Justice was a novelist, born in 1861 and married Walter Hely-Hutchison, son of Richard Hely-Hutchinson, 4th Earl of Donoughmore.
- His youngest daughter Marion Clive-Justice married in 1903 John Conway Lloyd, who was an unsuccessful Conservative party candidate for the 1910 election in Breconshire.
