= Deric Bolton =

Scottish research chemist and poet

Frederick James (Deric) Bolton (1908–1993) was a Scottish research chemist and poet born in Paisley. He studied at Birkbeck College, and was an exponent of the exploration and elucidation of science through verse. His poetry collections include Glasgow Central Station (1972) and a volume of selected poems, August Morning on Tweed (Galliard, 1991). He lived most of his life in Edinburgh and was vice-chair of the Scottish Association for the Speaking of Verse.
