= Pro Arte Orchestra =

UK symphony orchestra

The Pro Arte Orchestra was a British symphony orchestra founded in 1955.

== Background ==
The Pro Arte Orchestra was founded as a limited company chaired by the double-bass player Eugene Cruft; directors also included Archie Camden and Antony English. The initial aim was to perform "the finest of the lighter classics in orchestral music". The first concert was given at the Royal Festival Hall on 21 October 1955 with a Rossini overture, Schubert's Unfinished, Lalo's Symphonie Espagnole and works by Strauss and Chabrier, conducted by Sir Malcolm Sargent. Much of the work of the orchestra, however, was in the recording studio, particularly for the Pye-Nixa label. Among others, the orchestra recorded in the studio between 1956–62 8 Gilbert and Sullivan operas (complete), as well as overtures for several others, all under the baton of Malcolm Sargent, all for the EMI label.

In the early years other players in the orchestra included Cecil Aronowitz, Francisco Gabarró, Richard Adeney, Peter Graeme, Gervase de Peyer, Raymond Cohen and Alan Civil. The last London performance advertised by the orchestra was in 1970.

== Discography ==
- Albinoni, Marcello, Cimarosa: Oboe concertos (Evelyn Rothwell)
- Arnell: The Great Detective – ballet suite
- Bach: Concerto for four harpsichords, Clavier Concertos 1 and 5 Mindru Katz
- Beethoven: Violin Concerto (Igor Oistrakh)
- Coates: Cinderella, London Bridge, The Enchanted Garden, By The Sleepy Lagoon, Footlights
- Elgar: Pomp and Circumstance Marches, Op. 39, Nos. 1 and 4 (George Weldon)
- Gay: The Beggar's Opera
- Handel: Music For The Royal Fireworks, Concerto a due cori in F Major (No. 2)
- Hely-Hutchinson: Carol Symphony (1966)
- Herrmann: Wuthering Heights
- Janáček: Sinfonietta and opera preludes
- Piccinni: La Cecchina, ossia La buona figliuola
- Rawsthorne: Madame Chrysanthème – Ballet Suite, Street Corner Overture
- Sullivan-Mackerras: Pineapple Poll
- Sullivan: Iolanthe, The Gondoliers, The Mikado, The Pirates of Penzance, H.M.S. Pinafore, Patience, Ruddigore and The Yeomen of the Guard; overtures Cox & Box, The Sorcerer and Princess Ida.
