= Piers Torday =

British children's writer (born 1974)

Piers Torday (born 1974) is a British children's writer. The son of the novelist Paul Torday, he was born in Northumberland and attended Eton College; he was a theatre and television producer for many years.

His book The Dark Wild (2014) won the Guardian Children's Fiction Prize for 2014. After Torday's father died, leaving an unfinished novel manuscript The Death of An Owl, Torday completed the novel.

Torday's adaptation of John Masefield's The Box of Delights was performed at Wilton's Music Hall in Shadwell in east London between 1 December 2017 and 6 January 2018, and revived at the same venue between 30 November 2018 and 5 January 2019. It was revived by the Royal Shakespeare Company from 31 October 2023, running until 7 January 2023. Amateur theatre group 'The Company of Ten' produced the play at the Abbey Theatre in St Albans from 19 December 2025–28 December 2025.

He has visited schools and libraries across the UK such as Edward Peake Middle School.

He is a writing coach at The Novelry.

== Works ==
- The Lost Magician, 2019
- The Frozen Sea, 2019
- The Last Wild, 2013
- The Dark Wild, 2014
- The Wild Beyond, 2015
- There May Be a Castle, 2016
- The Wild Before, 2021
