= 1893 Natal parliamentary election =

Early elections to the Legislative Council were held in the Colony of Natal between 14 and 20 September 1893. They followed the proclamation of new constitution on 4 July, granting the colony responsible government. Following the election, John Robinson was appointed the colony's first Premier. The new parliament in Pietermaritzburg was opened on 19 October.
