= Victor Hely-Hutchinson =

British composer and music administrator

- Born: Christian Victor Noel Hope Hely-Hutchinson; 26 December 1901; Cape Town, Cape Colony (now Cape Town, South Africa)
- Died: 11 March 1947 (aged 45); London, England
- Education: Eton College
- Alma mater: Balliol College, Oxford
- Occupations: Composer and conductor
- Father: Sir Walter Hely-Hutchinson

Christian Victor Noel Hope Hely-Hutchinson (26 December 1901 – 11 March 1947) was a British composer, conductor, pianist and music administrator. He is best known for the Carol Symphony and for humorous song-settings.

== Early life ==
Hely-Hutchinson was born in Newlands, Cape Town, Cape Colony (now Cape Town, South Africa). His parents were Sir Walter Hely-Hutchinson, Governor of Cape Colony from 1901 to 1910 during and after the Boer War, and May Hely-Hutchinson. He initially lived in Kent, then moved back to South Africa in 1907. He was taught the piano by Dr Thomas Barrow Dowling (1861–1926), the organist of Cape Town cathedral. Victor was a child prodigy, composing many pieces before the age of ten – his parents had a collection of sketches for violin and piano published as A Child's Thoughts in 1909.

In England in 1910, he was taught piano by Donald Tovey and was initially educated at Heatherdown School, near Ascot in Berkshire. In 1914, his father died. Victor was then educated at Eton College, and then read history at Balliol College, Oxford. Music, however, prevailed and after one year at Oxford he was granted permission to study for a Mus. Bac. at the Royal College of Music, where he studied conducting under Adrian Boult. In 1922, he returned to Cape Town to teach at the South African College of Music, which was later incorporated into the University of Cape Town.

== Later life and death ==
He married Marjorie Anna Hugo, daughter of Dr. Dirk de Vos and Mrs. Hugo of Sonnenstrahl, Wynberg, Cape Town in Cape Town in June 1925.

He joined the BBC at Savoy Hill in 1926, becoming a conductor, pianist, and accompanist. He moved to Hampstead, where his two sons were born. Sir Adrian Boult was a godfather to his children.

In 1933, he moved once again to Birmingham to become Midland Regional Director of Music for the BBC, where he formed and conducted the Midland Studio Orchestra. In 1934, he left the BBC to become Professor of Music at the University of Birmingham, taking over from Sir Granville Bantock. From 1934 to 1944 he was Peyton and Barber Professor of Music, where he founded the University of Birmingham Music Society.

In 1938, he saw signs of war, and relocated his family out of Birmingham to a nearby village. During the war he became an ARP warden. He became a D.Mus from Oxford University in 1941. He also joined the university's officer cadet force. In 1944, he returned to the BBC to become overall Director of Music, succeeding Arthur Bliss. He moved to St John's Wood. He never purchased a car, always using his bicycle.

The winter of 1947 was very long-lasting and to save fuel (which was still rationed), Hely-Hutchinson refused to switch on the radiators in his office. He developed a cold, which became influenza, and he was ill by late February 1947. By early March 1947 he was convalescing; he had been ill for six weeks, and it was thought that he had been making reasonable progress in recovering, but he died at his home at 26 Queen's Grove, in St. John's Wood, from acute meningitis on 11 March 1947 at the age of 45. Astra Desmond sang at his memorial service.

His son Chris married in 1963, and lived in Peopleton in Worcestershire until 1979, where he worked for GKN. In the early 1980s Chris lived in Culmington in south Shropshire. A grandson was born in August 1968, who attended Eton. A granddaughter was born in 1973, who married the grandson of David Ogilvy, 12th Earl of Airlie in 2009. The wife of Chris died in Shropshire on 29 March 2018, aged 74.

His son John married Allison Joyce Simpson on 27 April 1957 at St Columba's Church, Pont Street. They moved to South Africa in 1969 with their 2 children. John died on 30 December 2020

His wife Marjorie died in 1988.

== Works ==
Although mostly forgotten now, Hely-Hutchinson's orchestral music enjoyed some popularity during his lifetime, including the Overture to a Pantomime, and the substantial Variations, Intermezzo and Finale, (described by the composer as a set of symphonic variations) premiered at the Proms in 1927. The Young Idea, a lighter, jazz-influenced rhapsody for piano and orchestra, was also played at the Proms in 1930 and was recorded in 2008 with the BBC Concert Orchestra and David Owen Norris as soloist. A Symphony for small orchestra, using music reworked from some of his film scores, was heard posthumously at the Proms in 1947.

By far his best known work is the Carol Symphony written in 1927. The four movements - really chorale preludes rather than symphonic movements - are based on the traditional English Christmas carols:

- O Come, All Ye Faithful
- God Rest You Merry, Gentlemen
- The Coventry Carol and The First Nowell
- Here We Come A-wassailing

The third movement was used for the title music of the 1943 Children's Hour and 1984 BBC children's television adaptation of John Masefield's The Box of Delights, in particular the variation on the theme of The First Nowell.

He remains well known for his settings of various nursery rhymes and children's poems. His setting of "Old Mother Hubbard" is arranged in the manner of Handel. His song setting of Edward Lear's "The Owl and the Pussycat" was notably recorded in 1955 by Elton Hayes and featured regularly on the BBC's Children's Favourites radio show.

=== Songs ===
With texts by William Blake

- Five Songs of Innocence
  1. Piping down the valleys wild
  2. The Lamb
  3. Infant Joy
  4. Spring
  5. The Little Boy Lost
- The Echoing Green and Other Songs
  1. The Echoing Green
  2. The Shepherd
  3. Laughing Song
  4. Holy Thursday
  5. The Blossom
  6. A Cradle Song

With texts by Edward Lear

- Three Nonsense Songs
  1. The Owl and the Pussy-cat
  2. The Table and the Chair
  3. The Duck and the Kangaroo

With texts by Harry Graham

- Twenty-one songs from "Ruthless Rhymes for Heartless Homes" (1945)
- More Ruthless Rhymes for Heartless Homes (1946)

With texts by Walter de la Mare

- Three Songs from "Peacock Pie"
  - The cupboard
  - The window
  - The little old Cupid
- Song of a Soldier (1933)

=== Orchestral ===
- Three Fugal Fancies, for strings (1925)
- Carol Symphony (1927)
- Variations, Intermezzo and Finale for orchestra (1927)
- The Young Idea: Rhapsody for piano and orchestra (1930)
- Overture to a Pantomime (1938)
- Symphony for Small Orchestra (1942)
- Solemn Prelude, in G
- South African Suite

=== Dramatic ===
- Hearts are Trumps (Operetta) (1932)
- The Unveiling (Nativity play) (1932)
- Much incidental music for plays, theatre and radio

=== Chamber ===
- Piano Quintet
- Piano Sonata
- String Quartet
- Viola Sonata
- Violin Sonata

== Bibliography ==
- Jürgen Schaarwächter, Two Centuries of British Symphonism: From the beginnings to 1945. A preliminary survey, Vol. I, pp. 564–565, Georg Olms Verlag, Hildesheim-Zurich-New York, 2015.
- Artist Biography by Bruce Eder, Allmusic.com
- Mark Connelly, Christmas: A History, I. B. Tauris, London New York, 2012.
- Benjamin Britten, Letters from a Life Vol 1: 1923-39, Edited by Donald Mitchell.
