= Marion Angus =

Scottish poet

- Born: Marion Angus; 27 March 1865; Sunderland, England
- Died: 18 August 1946 (aged 81); Arbroath, Angus, Scotland
- Occupations: Poet & Biographer
- Writing career
- Language: Scots and English
- Notable works: "Alas, Poor Queen"
- Movements: Scottish Renaissance, Scots Language

Marion Emily Angus (1865–1946) was a Scottish poet who wrote in the Scots vernacular or Braid Scots, defined by some as a dialect of English and others as a closely related language. Her prose writings are mainly in standard English. She is seen as a forerunner of a Scottish Renaissance in inter-war poetry – her verse marks a departure from the Lallans tradition of Robert Burns towards that of Hugh MacDiarmid, Violet Jacob and others.

== Life ==
Born on 27 March 1865 in Sunderland, England, Marion Angus was the third of the six children of Mary Jessie, née Watson, and Henry Angus (1833–1902), a Presbyterian minister from North-East Scotland. Her grandfather on her mother's side was William Watson, sheriff-substitute of Aberdeen from 1829 to 1866, who in 1841 founded there the first industrial school for street children. Her father graduated from Marischal College in the same city and was ordained in Sunderland in 1859. He became minister of Erskine United Free Church, Arbroath, in 1876. He retired from the ministry in 1900.

The Angus family left Sunderland for Arbroath in February 1876, when Marion was almost eleven. She was educated at Arbroath High School, but did not follow her brothers into higher education. However, she may well have been to France, as she spoke the language fluently and made several references to France in her prose writings. She also visited Switzerland and left an account of it.

Marion wrote fictionalized diaries anonymously for a newspaper, the Arbroath Guide. Entitled The Diary of Arthur Ogilvie (1897–1898) and Christabel's Diary (1899), they were also published in book form, but no copies of the former have survived. These have been taken to shed indirect light on Angus's life in early adulthood, which included abundant family and church work, and exercise in the form of walking and cycling.

After the death of their father, Marion and her sister Emily ran a private school at their mother's house in Cults, outside Aberdeen, but this was given up after the outbreak of the First World War, during which Marion worked in an army canteen. She and her sister returned to Aberdeen in 1921. However, Emily became mentally ill in April 1930 and was admitted to the Glasgow Royal Asylum, Gartnavel. Marion moved to various places around Glasgow to be near the institution where her sister was. She continued to publish poetry and gave occasional lectures, but her finances deteriorated and she became subject to depression. A fellow Scots poet, Nan Shepherd, became a close friend in this period.

The only surviving body of Marion Angus's correspondence consists of letters to Marie Campbell Ireland, a friend she made in about 1930. A selection of these has been published. They and other letters betray a vein of disrespect and impatience with conventional society: "I don't know," she wrote to Ireland in about 1930, "that I care particularly for what is usually called 'cultivated people'. I found a more delicate and refined sympathy in my charwoman in Aberdeen than I did in any of my educated acquaintance." The unconventional side of her is recalled in an article by a friend that appeared after her death: "She was nothing if not original.... Even when her wit was mordant, she had a capacious and most generous heart."

Marion Angus returned to Arbroath in 1945 to be looked after by an erstwhile family servant, Williamina Sturrock Matthews. She died there on 18 August 1946. Her ashes were scattered on the sands of Elliot Links.

== Poetry ==
The first important published work by Marion Angus was a biography of her grandfather: Sheriff Watson of Aberdeen: the Story of his Life and his Work for the Young (1913). She did not begin to write poetry until after 1918. Her first volume, written in Scots, was The Lilt, which came out about the same time as MacDiarmid's first experiments in the Dunfermline Press. The first stanza of the title poem establishes Angus's "voice" as a poet.

Jean Gordon is weaving a' her lane
Twinin the threid wi a thocht o her ain,
Hearin the tune o the bairns at play
That they're singin among them ilka day;
And saftly, saftly ower the hill
Comes the sma, sma rain.

Five other volumes of verse followed: The Tinker's Road and other Verses (1924), Sun and Candlelight (1927), The Singin' Lass (1929), The Turn of Day (1931), and Lost Country and other Verses (1937). Her work was influenced by the Scottish ballad tradition and by early Scots poets such as Robert Henryson and William Dunbar, rather than by Burns. She associated in the pre-war Scottish Renaissance initially with revivalists like Violet Jacob, Alexander Gray and Lewis Spence, and then with MacDiarmid and his cultural efforts in the 1920s and 1930s, through inclusion of her work in Scottish Chapbook and Northern Numbers. She also did radio work at that time.

MacDiarmid voiced qualified approval of Angus's poetry in polemics for the Scottish Literary Journal in 1925 and 1926. Angus herself spoke of her ambitions and limitations as a poet in an address in the 1920s to the Scottish Association for the Speaking of Verse: "I would fain give voice to Scotland's great adventure of the soul." However, Helen Cruickshank notes in a memoir that Angus did not think highly of MacDiarmid as a poet or approve of his experiments in Synthetic Scots. Nonetheless, they moved in the same direction, going back beyond Burns to earlier, mainly Eastern Scots ballad and folk-song traditions. As Cruikshank put it, "She was steeped in the knowledge and lore of the Ballads, until they seemed part of her life. Lost love, unquiet spirits, barley-breid and elder-wine: they are the very stuff of the Ballads."

The scholar Katherine Gordon saw steady development in her work through the 1920s and 1930s: "The understated lyricism of The Lilt and Other Verses becomes, by the late 1920s, distinctly stronger and more emotionally potent in Sun and Candlelight and The Singin' Lass." Her interest in the supernatural in literature emerged early: "One poem which, when I was a child, made my flesh creep and filled me with a tearful pity" was 'The Brownie of Blednoch' by William Nicholson (1782–1849).

As Colin Milton wrote, "Marion Angus is a poet of the social and psychological margins: her poems hint and suggest rather than state, often conveying repressed or unreturned feelings and liminal states." Her exploration of the experience of women contrasts with "the mainly male-dominated poetry of the 'Renaissance' movement." Typical of the telling simplicity of her earlier work is this stanza from "Mary's Sang", which appeared in The Tinker's Road:

My beloved sall ha'e this he'rt tae break,
Reid, reid wine and the barley cake;
A he'rt tae break, an' a mou' tae kiss,
Tho' he be nae mine, as I am his.

== Posthumous interest ==
Angus's Selected Poems edited by Maurice Lindsay with a memoir by Helen Cruickshank appeared in 1950. Two more selections ensued in 2006. The editor of one, Aimée Chalmers, described in Braid Scots her discovery of Marion Angus: "A wee bookie poems bi Marion Angus (1865–1946) fell frae a library shelf, as if bi magic glamourie, at my feet. Her Scots tung heezed up ma hert. Her weirdfu, ghaistly verse, an her sparkie wit on the natur o time dirled ma heid. 'A thoosand years o clood and flame/An a' thing's the same and aye the same.' Whaun I read what some tattie scone had said aboot her: 'no life could be less conspicuous', I was scunnert. I did some delvin for masell, then wrote doon the richt wey o daen (the start o a selection o her work). That wasnae eneuch: I kent hoo she thocht aboot things frae whit she wrote and wantit mair o her spirit tae come though. Sae I traivelled her 'Tinker's Road' wi her, for some five years. Gey chancie, spookie things happened (whiles gied me the cauld creeps), but in the end I 'won ower the tap'."

Commenting on the sparseness of the information about Angus's life, Chalmers warns against extrapolating it from her poetry: "The pity is that rather than recognising her skill at transforming the particular into the universal, critics have sometimes allowed conjecture about her private life to stereotype and define the poet, thereby influencing their evaluation of her work."

Verse by Marion Angus has appeared in many anthologies, including Living Scottish Poets (Benn, [1931]), Oor Mither Tongue: An Anthology of Scots Vernacular Verse (Paisley: Alexander Gardner, 1937), Poets' Quair: An Anthology for Scottish Schools (Edinburgh: Oliver & Boyd, 1950), and more recently The Faber Book of Twentieth-Century Scottish Poetry (London, 1992), The Poetry of Scotland, Gaelic, Scots and English (Edinburgh, 1995), and Modern Scottish Women Poets (Edinburgh, 2003). Her most frequently anthologized poem is about Mary, Queen of Scots, "Alas, Poor Queen", written partly in standard English.

== Bibliography ==
- Round about Geneva (Aberdeen: T. Bunkle & Co., 1899). Travel
- Christabel's Diary (Aberdeen: T. Bunkle & Co., 1899). Fictional diary
- 'Green beads, the story of a lost love'. Pearson's Magazine (London), May 1906. Short story
- Sheriff Watson of Aberdeen: the Story of his Life and his Work for the Young (Aberdeen: Daily Journal, 1913). Biography
- The Lilt and Other Verses (Aberdeen: Wylie and Sons, 1922)
- The Tinker's Road and Other Verses (Glasgow/London: Gowans and Gray, 1924)
- Sun and Candlelight (Edinburgh: Porpoise Press, 1927). Verse
- The Singin' Lass (Edinburgh: Porpoise Press, 1929). Verse
- The Turn of the Day (Edinburgh: Porpoise Press, 1931). Verse
- Lost Country (Glasgow: Gowans and Gray, 1937). Verse
- Robert Henry Corstorphine (Aberdeen: T. Bunkle & Co., 1942). As contributor
- Selected Poems of Marion Angus, ed. by Helen B. Cruickshank and Maurice Lindsay (Edinburgh: Serif Books, 1950). Includes a short biography.
- Voices from their Ain Countrie: the poems of Marion Angus and Violet Jacob, ed. Katherine Gordon (Glasgow: Association for Scottish Literary Studies, 2006). ISBN 0-948877-76-6. Includes a longer bibliography.
- The Singin Lass. Selected Works of Marion Angus, edited and compiled by Aimée Chalmers (Edinburgh: Polygon, 2006), ISBN 1-904598-64-1. Selections of poetry and prose, illustrated, with a bibliography.

== External resources ==
- The Scottish Poetry Library site includes five poems by Angus and a select bibliography. Retrieved 10 April 2012.
- Three of Angus's poems online: Retrieved 8 December 2011.
- Two poems by Angus and a photograph of her in middle age: Retrieved 9 December 2011.
- "Foxes Skin", a Marion Angus verse set to a traditional tune on YouTube Retrieved 8 December 2011.]
- Colin Milton, "Angus, Marion Emily (1865–1946)", Oxford Dictionary of National Biography (Oxford: Oxford University Press, 2004); online edn, October 2008 Retrieved 8 December 2011.
- Review of the 2006 The Singin Lass: Retrieved 17 April 2012.
- Voices from Their Ain Countrie: The Poems of Marion Angus and Violet Jacob, ed. Katherine Gordon (Glasgow: Association for Scottish Literary Studies, 2006). ISBN 0-948877-76-6. This includes selections from most of Angus's published volumes. An introductory study by the author is available online: Retrieved 8 December 2011.
- University of St Andrews' doctoral dissertation on Marion Angus, by Aimée Y. Chalmers, 2010: Retrieved 9 December 2011.
- Colm Tóibín: "I was Mary Queen of Scots". London Review of Books XXVI/20 (21 October 2004). Access tied to a subscription. Retrieved 15 November 2012. This includes a detailed critical appraisal of Angus's "Alas, Poor Queen".
