= ODTAA =

- First edition (publ. Heinemann)
- Author: John Masefield
- Language: English
- Publication date: 1926

ODTAA (1926) by John Masefield is an adventure novel first published in February 1926. The letters in its title stand for "One Damn Thing After Another". It opens with establishing narrative describing the fictional nation of Santa Barbara, which "lies far to leeward of the Sugar States, is at the angle of the continent [of South America], with two coasts, one facing to the north, the other east. The city of Santa Barbara is in a bay at the angle where these two coasts trend one from each other".

The novel is set prior to the events described in Masefield's earlier novel Sard Harker.

The novel inspired the orchestral overture, also titled ODTAA, by Doreen Carwithen.
