= Kay Harker =

Fictional character by John Masefield

Kay Harker is a fictional character, the young hero of the books The Midnight Folk and The Box of Delights by John Masefield, and the BBC series of The Box of Delights. The series ran in 1984, where the character was played by actor Devin Stanfield. Kay is of an unspecified age, and the book follows his adventures one Christmas holiday alongside his contemporaries who are staying for the holidays.

Kay with Cole Hawlings on the UK DVD Box of Delights cover

== Kay Harker in The Box of Delights ==
Kay Harker plays a key role in The Box of Delights, in which he leads the way in the hunt for the infamous Abner Brown. Despite a complete lack of aid from the local police, Kay manages to discover the location of Abner Brown, who seeks to capture the famed Box of Delights. The abduction of Cole Hawlings, owner of the box, marks a turning point in the story, as Kay and friends (namely Maria, Susan, Jemima and Peter Jones) go in search of his abductor with the assistance of Herne the Hunter and various others. Kay eventually manages to thwart the plans of Abner Brown by rescuing Cole Hawlings (and the choirboys) from Brown's subterranean dungeon. The story concludes with great festivities on Christmas Eve as the abducted make their way back home in time for the Christmas Service. The story concludes with Kay's re-awakening on the train home for the start of the Christmas holidays, with the realisation that the story was nothing more than a dream.

== Kay Harker and the Jones family children ==
In the book and the BBC series, these characters play the most important role in the rescue of Cole Hawlings and the downfall of Abner Brown. Peter Jones is arguably Kay's lieutenant, who lends help and company to his friend when it is most needed, notably their dawn expedition onto the downs, where they observe the abduction of Cole Hawlings. Peter is also important in the evasive manœuvres taken to escape Abner and his henchmen, as "casts off" the miniature boat used by the children in their escape. Maria Jones plays an important part in the reconnaissance work carried out prior to the rescue of Cole Hawlings, as her previous abduction gives Kay an important insight into the minds of Abner Brown and his accomplices. Maria is a hardy young girl, and states in Episode 1 that her idea of fun would be a "gunfight" with "bandits", and proclaims that she is a "dead shot with both hands" when firing her airgun. Sisters Jemima and Susan Jones play a minor role in the series, and feature briefly in Episode 1 and elsewhere as stock family members.
