= The Box of Delights =

1935 children's novel by John Masefield

- First edition cover
- Author: John Masefield
- Language: English
- Genre: Fantasy novel
- Publisher: Heinemann
- Publication date: 1935
- Publication place: United Kingdom
- Media type: Print (hardback & paperback)
- Pages: 309
- Preceded by: The Midnight Folk

The Box of Delights is a children's fantasy novel by John Masefield. It is a sequel to The Midnight Folk, and was first published in 1935. It is also known as When The Wolves Were Running.

== Plot ==
Kay Harker is returning from boarding school when he finds himself mixed up in a battle to possess a magical box. It allows the owner to shrink in size, to fly swiftly, to go into the past and to experience the magical wonders contained within the box.

The current owner of the box is an old Punch and Judy man called Cole Hawlings whom Harker meets at the railway station. They develop an instant rapport, which leads Hawlings to confide that he is being chased by a magician called Abner Brown and his gang, which includes Harker's former governess. For safety, Hawlings (who turns out to be the medieval philosopher and alleged magician Ramon Llull) entrusts the box to Harker. The schoolboy then goes on to have many adventures as he protects the box from those who wish to use it for bad deeds.

== Adaptations ==
=== BBC radio ===
There have been multiple radio adaptations of The Box of Delights.

==== Children's Hour ====
This six-part adaptation, with a script by Robert Holland and John Keir Cross, was produced three times by the BBC as part of its Children's Hour, in 1943, 1948 and 1955.

===== 1943 =====
- Kay Harker: John Gilpin
- Abner Brown: Robert Farquharson
- Cole Hawlings: Hay Petrie
- Rat: Philip Wade
- Mouse: Charles Hawtrey
- Narrator: Norman Shelley
- Peter Jones: Peter Mullins
- Jemima Jones: Sheila Potts
- Maria Jones: Dorothy Gordon
- Caroline Louisa: Joan Carol
- Foxy man: Malcolm Graeme and Gibb McLaughlin
- Chubby man: Wilfred Babbage
- Sylvia Pouncer: Joan Young
- Inspector: Dick Francis
- Rogers: Malcolm Graeme
- The Head: Arthur Bush

===== 1948 =====
- Kay Harker: David Page
- Cole Hawlings: Harcourt Williams
- Caroline Louisa: Rosemary Davis
- Foxy Man: Carleton Hobbs
- Chubby Man: Wilfred Babbage
- Peter Jones: David Spenser
- Maria Jones: Dorothy Gordon
- Jemima Jones: Audrey Blair
- Porter: Preston Lockwood
- Sylvia Pouncer: Gladys Young
- Rat: David Kossoff
- The Inspector: Dick Francis
- Pirate: Arthur Bush
- Mouse: Charles Hawtrey
- Thomson: Arthur Bush
- Narrator: Norman Shelley

===== 1955 =====
- Kay Harker: Patricia Hayes
- Cole Hawlings: Deering Wells
- Caroline Louisa: Rosemary Davis
- The Foxy Man: Carleton Hobbs
- The Chubby Man: Wilfred Babbage
- Porter: Eric Lugg
- Peter Jones: William Simons
- Maria Jones: Dorothy Gordon
- Jemima Jones: Marise Hepworth
- Rat: Ernest Jay
- The Inspector: Frank Atkinson
- Rum Chops: Arthur Bush
- Mouse: Charles Hawtrey
- The Bishop's Sister: Susan Richards
- Ellen: Janet Morrison
- The Head: Arthur Bush
- Narrator: Norman Shelley

==== Saturday Night Theatre ====
This was a one-off drama, with a script by John Keir Cross, broadcast in 1966, and repeated in 1968 and 1969. It was then remade with a new cast in 1977.

===== 1966 =====
- Kay Harker (a man): Harman Grisewood
- Kay Harker (a boy): Patricia Hayes
- Cole Hawlings: Cyril Shaps
- Foxy-faced man: Henry Stamp
- Chubby man: Wilfred Babbage
- Miss Caroline Louisa: Carol Marsh
- The Lady of the Ring: Noel Howe
- Maria Jones: Jo Manning Wilson
- Susan Jones: Sian Davies
- Peter Jones: Eva Hadbon
- The Bishop: Preston Lockwood
- Abner Brown: Felix Felton
- Rat: Norman Shelley
- Alf Rat: Stanley Unwin
- Police Inspector: Hector Ross
- Sylvia Daisy Pouncer: Joan Matheson

===== 1977 =====
- Kay Harker (a man): David Davis
- Kay Harker (a boy): Jean English
- Abner Brown: Heron Carvic
- Cole Hawlings: Cyril Shaps
- Foxy Man: Roy Spencer
- Chubby Man: Paul Meier
- Caroline Louisa: Irene Sutcliffe
- Sylvia Daisy Pouncer: Kathleen Helmk
- Rat: Norman Shelley
- Lady of the Ring: Grizelda Hervet
- Inspector: Rod Beacham
- Jemima Jones: Nicolette McKenzie
- Maria Jones: Anne Rosenfeld
- Susan Jones: Jane Knowles
- Peter Jones: Judy Bennett
- Bishop: Lewis Stringer
- The boy: John Levitt
- The Bronze Head: John Gabriel

==== Radio 4 ====
===== 1995 =====
Two-part drama with a script by John Peacock.

- Abner Brown: Donald Sinden
- Cole Hawlings: Lionel Jeffries
- Arnold of Todi: Spike Milligan
- Kay Harker: Alastair Sooke
- Sylvia Daisy Pouncer: Celia Imrie

=== BBC Television 1984 ===
A BBC TV adaptation of The Box of Delights was broadcast in six parts between 21 November and 24 December in 1984. It starred Devin Stanfield, Patrick Troughton and Robert Stephens as Kay Harker, Cole Hawlings and Abner Brown respectively and adapted for television by Alan Seymour, directed by Renny Rye and produced by Paul Stone.

It featured an innovative mixture of live action and animation, in particular Quantel Paintbox and chroma key effects. The series cost £1-million to make in 1984, the most expensive children's series the BBC had made to that date, but it was widely acclaimed and won a number of BAFTA and RTS awards, in particular for its special effects.

The opening and closing title music features an orchestral arrangement of "The First Nowell" extracted from the third movement of the Carol Symphony by Victor Hely-Hutchinson. It had been used for earlier radio adaptations and has become synonymous with the story.

=== Eclipse Performing Arts 2011 ===
Eclipse Performing Arts, a theatre company in Corby, Northamptonshire, were given rights to adapt the book into 6 radio episodes to be broadcast on Corby Radio on the 6 Saturdays leading up to Christmas Eve. Jim Byrne and Gavin Mills adapted and produced the series and behind-the-scenes podcast (BODcast) called Opening the Box in which they discussed how each episode was created including interviews with the cast.

The cast included local amateur performers from around Northamptonshire and was recorded in and around the local Corby area.

Original Corby Radio broadcast dates:

Episode One - Saturday 19 November 2011

When The Wolves Were Running

Broadcast: Corby Radio – Saturday 19 November 2011 at 8pm – 16 Minutes

Cast:

- Iona Smith – Kay Harker
- Kevin Sheen – Cole Hawlings
- Joe O’Neill – Charles
- Robert Campbell – Joe
- Lisa Neave – Caroline Louisa, The Old Lady
- Daniel O’Neill – Peter
- Leigh Connelly – Maria
- Beth Carey – Susan, Jemima
- Jim Byrne – Railway Porter, Jim the Driver, Herne the Hunter, Cockfarthings, Poppyhead
- Gavin Mills – The Bishop Of Tatchester
- Tatchester Choir – George Ogilvie, Anna Cunnington, Lois Crossen, Andrew Grey, Vicky Coppard, Luke Monahan, Laurence Voirin, Robert Campbell, Hannah Sibbald

Episode Two - Saturday 26 November 2011

The Wolves at Arthurs Camp

Broadcast: Corby Radio – Saturday 26 November 2011 at 8pm – 19 Minutes

Cast:

- Iona Smith – Kay Harker
- Kevin Sheen – Cole Hawlings
- Joe O’Neill – Charles
- Robert Campbell – Joe
- Alan Byrne – Abner Brown
- Gavin Mills – Rat
- Beth Carey – Susan, Jemima
- Daniel O’Neill – Peter
- Leigh Connelly – Maria
- Karen Sheen – Ellen
- Jordan Burn – Horse
- Jim Byrne – Inspector, Herne the Hunter

Episode Three - Saturday 3 December 2011

Herne and onto the Rupert Arms

Broadcast: Corby Radio – Saturday 3 December 2011 at 8pm – 20 Minutes

Cast:

- Iona Smith – Kay Harker
- Alan Byrne – Abner Brown
- Karen Sheen – Sylvia Daisy Pouncer, Ellen
- Robert Campbell – Joe
- Gavin Mills – Rat, Alf
- Leigh Connelly – Maria, Mrs Calamine
- Joe O’Neill – Charles
- Beth Carey – Susan, Jemima
- Daniel O’Neill – Peter
- Jim Byrne – Inspector, Herne the Hunter

Episode Four - Saturday 10 December 2011

Down the River and Beyond

Broadcast: Corby Radio – Saturday 10 December 2011 at 8pm – 15 Minutes

Cast:

- Iona Smith – Kay Harker
- Alan Byrne – Abner Brown
- Karen Sheen – Ellen, Sylvia Daisy Pouncer
- Gavin Mills – The Bishop Of Tatchester
- Jim Byrne – Rogers, Captain, Inspector
- Daniel O’Neill – Peter
- Lisa Neave – The Old Lady, Caroline Louisa
- Beth Carey – Susan, Jemima
- Leigh Connelly – Maria
- Robert Campbell – Joe
- Joe O’Neill – Charles

Episode Five - Saturday 17 December 2011

The Blackness of Hidden Caves

Broadcast: Corby Radio – Saturday 17 December 2011 at 8pm – 18 Minutes

Cast:

- Iona Smith – Kay Harker
- Daniel O’Neill – Peter
- Lisa Neave – Caroline Louisa, The Old Lady
- Joe O’Neill – Charles
- Robert Campbell – Joe
- Karen Sheen – Sylvia Daisy Pouncer
- Leigh Connelly – Maria
- Rob Harvey – The Newspaper Seller
- Beth Carey – Jemima
- Jim Byrne – Inspector, Arnold of Todi, Herne the Hunter
- Alan Byrne – Abner Brown

Episode Six - Saturday 24 December 2011

Trouble at Chester Hills

Broadcast: Corby Radio – Saturday 24 December 2011 at 8pm – 33 Minutes

Cast:

- Iona Smith – Kay Harker
- Kevin Sheen – Cole Hawlings
- Beth Carey – Susan, Jemima
- Daniel O’Neill – Peter
- Robert Campbell – Joe
- Joe O’Neill – Charles
- Karen Sheen – Sylvia Daisy Pouncer
- Leigh Connelly – Maria
- Lisa Neave – Caroline Louisa, The Old Lady
- Gavin Mills – Bishop of Tatchester, The Beast, The Banshee
- Jim Byrne – Arnold of Todi, The Head, Water Boy, Inspector, Herne the Hunter
- Robert Harvey – The Electrician
- Alan Byrne – Abner Brown

The final episode was preceded by a two hour live radio show in which Gavin and Jim hosted the cast in a celebration of the show with the cast choosing their favourite songs throughout the broadcast.

Due to the original broadcasting rights given to Eclipse Performing Arts, the shows were only available to listen to at the time of broadcast on the radio or for 4 weeks after on the Corby radio website. The production was originally broadcast in 2011 but received a second broadcast in Nov/Dec of 2025 on Corby Radio with new introductions to each episode recorded by the director.

=== Big Finish 2021 ===
Big Finish Productions produced an audio play of The Box of Delights, which was released on CD and download in June 2021, starring Derek Jacobi, Mark Gatiss and David Warner. The script was adapted by Christopher William Hill.

=== Opera ===
John Masefield adapted an opera libretto from his book, also incorporating elements of The Midnight Folk, which was eventually set to music in the late 1980s by the British composer Robert Steadman.

=== Theatre ===
Wilton's Music Hall presented an adaptation by Piers Torday between 1 December 2017 and 6 January 2018. Billed as a world stage premiere, the production was directed by Justin Audibert and designed by Tom Piper. The production was reprised, with a new cast, between 30 November 2018 and 5 January 2019.

The Royal Shakespeare Company presented the production at the Royal Shakespeare Theatre, Stratford-upon-Avon between 31 October 2023 and 7 January 2024.

The Company of Ten produced the play at the Abbey Theatre in St Albans from 19 December 2025 – 28 December 2025.
