= The Midnight Folk =

1927 book by John Masefield

- First edition (publ. Heinemann)
- Author: John Masefield
- Language: English
- Genre: Children's fantasy novel
- Publisher: Heinemann
- Publication date: 1927
- Publication place: United Kingdom
- Media type: Print (hardcover and paperback)
- Followed by: The Box of Delights

The Midnight Folk is a children's fantasy novel by John Masefield first published in 1927. It is about a boy, Kay Harker, who sets out to discover what became of a fortune stolen from his seafaring great-grandfather Aston Tirrold Harker (in reality, Aston Tirrold is a village in Oxfordshire). The treasure is also sought by a coven of witches who are seeking it for their own ends. Kay's governess Sylvia Daisy Pouncer is a member of the coven. The witches are led or guided by the wizard Abner Brown.

Kay Harker is aided in his quest by various talking animals, most notably Nibbins the cat, who used to be a witch's cat but has reformed. There are two other household cats: the main antagonist is Blackmalkin, and he is aided by the mysterious Greymalkin who takes his name from the witch's familiar in the opening scene of William Shakespeare's Macbeth.

Kay Harker has various adventures—sailing on the high seas, swimming with mermaids, flying on broomsticks. At one point in the novel he manages to see into the past. Many maternal characters appear in the book; one takes Kay on a nocturnal ride on a magical horse. She then reappears at the end of the book as Caroline Louisa, Kay's new guardian, and tells Kay, "... I loved your mother...". It is possible that she represents Masefield's memory of his own mother who died when he was very young.

Kay's toys (known as "the guards") have been taken away from him at the start of the book, apparently because they will remind him of his parents; there is a strong implication that Kay's parents are deceased. The guards play little part in the main narrative but have a critical role in the final recovery of the treasure.

The Midnight Folk is written as one piece. There are no chapter divisions. Division within the text is obtained by moving from prose to verse or even song in some places.

== Recurrences ==
John Masefield threaded a number of common themes through a series of his books; even those novels aimed at children shared places, people and storylines with some of his adult novels. One key recurring theme is the nautical visit of a member of the Harker family to the fictional islands of Santa Barbara. In The Midnight Folk, Kay's great-grandfather is endowed with a great treasure there; in other novels the actual nature of the seafaring Harker's relationship to Kay is less clear. A great many incidental characters and places are shared across Masefield's novels, although the fine details of such recurrences are often contradictory from novel to novel.

Several characters from the book make return appearances in the sequel The Box of Delights:

- Kay Harker
- Caroline Louisa is installed as Kay's guardian at the end of The Midnight Folk, having appeared earlier in the novel as one of Kay's supernatural helpers. She remains Kay's guardian throughout The Box of Delights.
- Abner Brown is the principal villain in both novels, but plays a more prominent role in The Box of Delights.
- Sylvia Daisy Pouncer dishonourably leaves her role as Kay's governess at the end of The Midnight Folk, only to return as Abner Brown's wife in The Box of Delights.
- Ellen is the maid at Seekings House in both books.
- Nibbins the cat has a large role in The Midnight Folk but a mere mention in The Box of Delights.
- The supernatural statue with powers of clairvoyance known as 'Head' appears in both books.
- The cellar rat is Kay's ally in The Midnight Folk, supplying information in return for raisins, bacon rind and (most appreciated by Rat) a "Naggy" (haggis). In The Box of Delights, the rat has come to hate Kay (because he expects Kay to get a dog), so Abner Brown is able to buy information from him with rum and mouldy cheese.
- Early on in the book, Kay reads the names of his long-lost toys ('The Guards') and among them are the names Jemima, Maria, Susan and Peter which are the names of the Jones children in The Box of Delights written years later.

== Reception ==
- He has written a book which will be a source of delight to children of future generations well as his own, one that ranks with such masterpieces in this genre The Water Babies, Alice in Wonderland and Sylvie and Bruno. — The Northern Whig, 1927
- John Masefield is growing younger every year. He was old in Multitude and Solitude. He had grown appreciably younger in Sard Harker. He is a child among the children in "The Midnight Folk", which is incomparably the best book of its kind that has appeared since Mrs. Hubert Bland died. — The Illustrated London News, 1927.
- A thread of quiet sarcasm and common sense runs through the amazing narrative., and the marvellous adventures of Kay with the Midnight-Folk will prove entertaining to all adults not blessed, or the reverse, with literal minds. — Derbyshire Advertiser & Journal, 1928.

== Adaptations ==
In 1958, John Keir Cross wrote a radio adaptation of the book for the BBC. It was broadcast on Children's Hour in five parts during the lead up to Christmas that year. Patricia Hayes played Kay Harker and the narrator was Richard Hurndall.

A two-part production was broadcast on BBC Radio 4 on Sundays 10 and 17 December 2006, repeated on the following Saturdays and on BBC Radio 7 in December 2008. It was dramatised by Christopher William Hill, produced and directed by Tracey Neale, with music composed by Neil Brand. It features Sam Salter, Nickolas Grace, Charles Dance (as Abner Brown), Deborah Findlay, Andrew Sachs, Liz Smith, Helena Breck, Jon Glover, Ewan Bailey, Ann Beach, Harry Myers, Graham Seed, Miranda Keeling, Bethan Walker, Mark Straker, Sam Dale, Ian Masters, Joseph Kloska and Christine Kavanagh.
