= John Masefield =

English poet and writer (1878–1967)

John Masefield OM
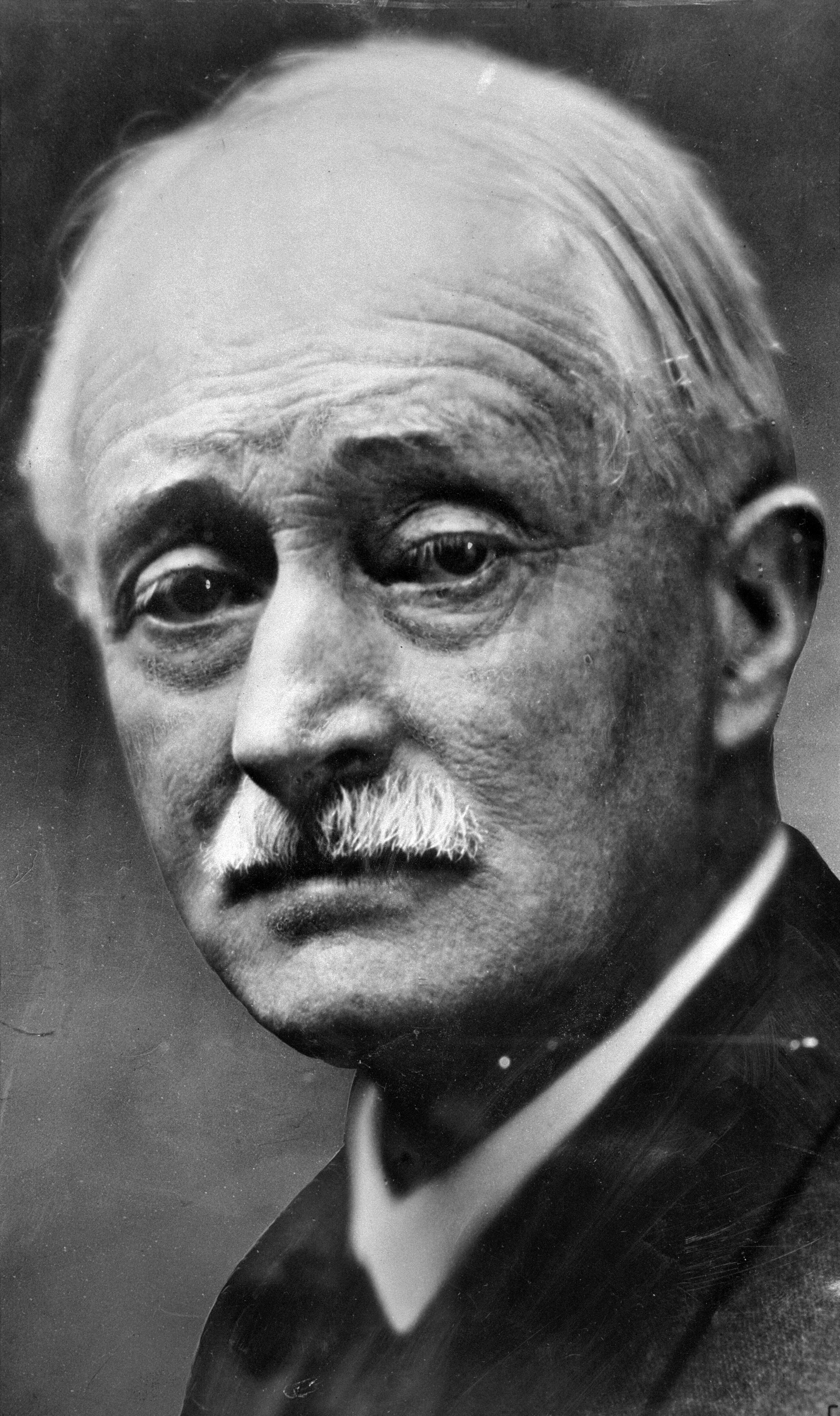
- John Masefield in 1936

Poet Laureate of the United Kingdom
- In office 9 May 1930 – 12 May 1967
- Monarchs: George V Edward VIII; George VI; Elizabeth II
- Preceded by: Robert Bridges
- Succeeded by: Cecil Day-Lewis

Personal details
- Born: John Edward Masefield; 1 June 1878 Ledbury, Herefordshire, England
- Died: 12 May 1967 (aged 88) Abingdon, Berkshire, England
- Occupation: Poet, writer
- Awards: Shakespeare Prize (1938)
- Writing career
- Genres: Poetry, children's novels

John Edward Masefield, OM (/ˈmeɪsˌfiːld, ˈmeɪz-/; 1 June 1878 – 12 May 1967) was an English poet and writer. He was Poet Laureate from 1930 until his death in 1967, during which time he lived at Burcot, Oxfordshire, near Abingdon-on-Thames. Among his best known works are the children's novels The Midnight Folk and The Box of Delights, and the poems "The Everlasting Mercy" and "Sea-Fever". Shortly after his death his house (Burcote Brook) burned down and was later replaced by a Cheshire Home named after him.

== Biography ==
=== Early life ===
Masefield was born in Ledbury, Herefordshire, to George Masefield, a solicitor, and his wife Caroline (née Parker). He was baptised in the Church at Preston Cross, just outside Ledbury. His mother died giving birth to his sister when Masefield was six, and he went to live with his aunt. His father died soon afterwards, following a mental breakdown.

After a very happy education at the King's School in Warwick (now known as Warwick School where he even had a building named after him), where he was a boarder between 1888 and 1891, he left to board HMS Conway, both to train for a life at sea and to break his addiction to reading, of which his aunt thought little. He spent several years aboard this ship, and found that he could spend much of his time reading and writing. It was aboard the Conway that Masefield's love of story-telling grew. While he was on the ship, he listened to the stories told about sea lore, continued to read, and decided that he was to become a writer and story-teller himself. Masefield gives an account of life aboard the Conway in his book New Chum.

I must down to the seas again, to the lonely sea and the sky,
And all I ask is a tall ship and a star to steer her by,
And the wheel's kick and the wind's song and the white sail's shaking,
And a grey mist on the sea's face and a grey dawn breaking.

I must go down to the seas again, for the call of the running tide
Is a wild call and a clear call that may not be denied;
And all I ask is a windy day with the white clouds flying,
And the flung spray and the blown spume, and the sea-gulls crying.

— From "Sea-Fever", in Salt-Water Ballads (1902)

In 1894 Masefield boarded the Gilcruix, destined for Chile. This first voyage brought him the experience of sea sickness, but his record of his experiences while sailing through extreme weather shows his delight in seeing flying fish, porpoises and birds. He was awed by the beauty of nature, including a rare sighting of a nocturnal rainbow, on this voyage. On reaching Chile, he suffered from sunstroke and was hospitalised. He eventually returned home to England as a passenger aboard a steamship. His experiences on the voyage were used as material for his narrative poem Dauber (1913).

In 1895 Masefield returned to sea on a windjammer destined for New York City. However, the urge to become a writer and the hopelessness of life as a sailor overtook him, and in New York he jumped ship and travelled throughout the countryside. For several months he lived as a vagrant, drifting between odd jobs, before he returned to New York City and found work as a barkeeper's assistant. Some time around Christmas 1895, he read the December edition of Truth, a New York periodical, which contained the poem "The Piper of Arll" by Duncan Campbell Scott. Ten years later, Masefield wrote to Scott to tell him what reading that poem had meant to him:

I had never (till that time) cared very much for poetry, but your poem impressed me deeply, and set me on fire. Since then poetry has been the one deep influence in my life, and to my love of poetry I owe all my friends, and the position I now hold.

Stately Spanish galleon coming from the Isthmus,
Dipping through the Tropics by the palm-green shores,
With a cargo of diamonds,
Emeralds, amethysts,
Topazes, and cinnamon, and gold moidores.

Dirty British coaster with a salt-caked smoke stack,
Butting through the Channel in the mad March days,
With a cargo of Tyne coal,
Road-rails, pig-lead,
Firewood, ironware, and cheap tin trays.

— From "Cargoes", in Ballads (1903)

From 1895 to 1897, Masefield was employed at the huge Alexander Smith carpet factory in Yonkers, New York, where long hours were expected and conditions were far from ideal. He purchased up to 20 books a week, and devoured both modern and classical literature. His interests at this time were diverse, and his reading included works by George du Maurier, Alexandre Dumas (père), Thomas Browne, William Hazlitt, Charles Dickens, Rudyard Kipling, and Robert Louis Stevenson. Chaucer also became very important to him during this time, as well as Keats and Shelley. In 1897, Masefield returned home to England as a passenger aboard a steamship.

In 1901, when Masefield was 23, he met his future wife, Constance de la Cherois Crommelin (6 February 1867 – 18 February 1960, from Cushendun in County Antrim, Northern Ireland; she was a sister to Andrew Claude de la Cherois Crommelin), aged 35, and of Huguenot descent. They married on 23 June 1903 at St. Mary, Bryanston Square. Educated in classics and English Literature, and a mathematics teacher, Constance was a good match for him, despite the difference in their ages. The couple had two children: Judith, born Isabel Judith, 28 April 1904, in London, died in Sussex, 1 March 1988; and Lewis Crommelin, born in 1910, in London, killed in action in Africa, 29 May 1942.

In 1902 Masefield was put in charge of the fine arts section of the Arts and Industrial Exhibition in Wolverhampton. By then his poems were being published in periodicals and his first collection of verse, Salt-Water Ballads, was published that year. It included the poem "Sea-Fever". Masefield then wrote two novels, Captain Margaret (1908) and Multitude and Solitude (1909). In 1911, after a long period of writing no poems, he composed The Everlasting Mercy, the first of his narrative poems, and within the next year had produced two more, "The Widow in the Bye Street" and "Dauber". As a result, he became widely known to the public and was praised by the critics. In 1912 he was awarded the annual Edmond de Polignac Prize.

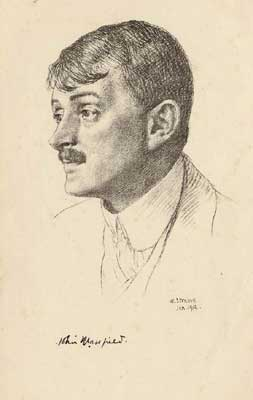
1912

=== From the First World War to appointment as Poet Laureate ===
When the First World War began in 1914 Masefield was old enough to be exempted from military service, but he joined the staff of a British hospital for French soldiers, the Hôpital Temporaire d'Arc-en-Barrois in Haute-Marne, serving a six-week term during the spring of 1915. He later published an account of his experiences. At about this time Masefield moved his country retreat from Buckinghamshire to Lollingdon Farm in Cholsey, the setting that inspired a number of poems and sonnets under the title Lollingdon Downs, and which his family used until 1917.

After returning home, Masefield was invited to the United States on a three-month lecture tour. Although his primary purpose was to lecture on English literature, he also intended to collect information on the mood and views of Americans regarding the war in Europe. When he returned to England, he submitted a report to the British Foreign Office and suggested that he should be allowed to write a book about the failure of the Allied effort in the Dardanelles that might be used in the United States to counter German propaganda there. The resulting work, Gallipoli, was a success. Masefield then met the head of British Military Intelligence in France and was asked to write an account of the Battle of the Somme. Although Masefield had grand ideas for his book, he was denied access to official records and what was intended to be the preface was published as The Old Front Line, a description of the geography of the Somme area.

In 1918 Masefield returned to America on his second lecture tour, spending much of his time speaking and lecturing to American soldiers waiting to be sent to Europe. These speaking engagements were very successful. On one occasion a battalion of black soldiers danced and sang for him after his lecture. During this tour he matured as a public speaker and realised his ability to touch the emotions of his audience with his style of speaking, learning to speak publicly from his own heart rather than from dry scripted speeches. Towards the end of his visit both Yale and Harvard Universities conferred honorary doctorates of letters on him.

Masefield photographed by E. O. Hoppé in 1915

Masefield entered the 1920s as an accomplished and respected writer. His family was able to settle on Boar's Hill, a somewhat rural setting not far from Oxford, where Masefield took up beekeeping, goat-herding and poultry-keeping. He continued to meet with success: the first edition of his Collected Poems (1923) sold about 80,000 copies. A narrative poem, Reynard The Fox (1920), has been critically compared with works by Geoffrey Chaucer, not necessarily to Masefield's credit. This was followed by Right Royal and King Cole, poems in which the relationship between humanity and nature is emphasised.

After King Cole, Masefield turned away from long poems and back to novels. Between 1924 and 1939 he published 12 novels, which vary from stories of the sea (The Bird of Dawning, Victorious Troy) to social novels about modern England (The Hawbucks, The Square Peg), and from tales of an imaginary land in Central America (Sard Harker, Odtaa) to fantasies for children (The Midnight Folk, The Box of Delights). In this same period he wrote a large number of dramatic pieces. Most of these were based on Christian themes, and Masefield, to his amazement, encountered a ban on the performance of plays on biblical subjects that went back to the Reformation and had been revived a generation earlier to prevent production of Oscar Wilde's Salome. However, a compromise was reached and in 1928 his The Coming of Christ was the first play to be performed in an English cathedral since the Middle Ages.

=== Encouraging the speaking of verse ===
In 1921 Masefield gave the British Academy's Shakespeare Lecture and received an honorary doctorate of literature from the University of Oxford. In 1923 he organised Oxford Recitations, an annual contest whose purpose was "to discover good speakers of verse and to encourage 'the beautiful speaking of poetry'". Given the numbers of contest applicants, the event's promotion of natural speech in poetical recitations, and the number of people learning how to listen to poetry, Oxford Recitations was generally deemed a success.

Masefield was similarly a founding member of the Scottish Association for the Speaking of Verse in 1924. He later came to question whether the Oxford events should continue as a contest, considering that they might better be run as a festival. However, in 1929, after he broke with the competitive element, Oxford Recitations came to an end. The Scottish Association for the Speaking of Verse, on the other hand, continued to develop through the influence of associated figures such as Marion Angus and Hugh MacDiarmid and exists today as the Poetry Association of Scotland.

=== Later years ===
In 1930, on the death of Robert Bridges, a new poet laureate was needed. On the recommendation of the Prime Minister, Ramsay MacDonald, King George V appointed Masefield, who remained in the post until his death in 1967. The only person to hold the office for a longer period was Alfred, Lord Tennyson. On Masefield's appointment, The Times wrote of him that "his poetry could touch to beauty the plain speech of everyday life". Masefield took his appointment seriously and produced a large quantity of poems for royal occasions, which were sent to The Times for publication. Masefield's modesty was shown by his inclusion of a stamped and self-addressed envelope with each submission so that the poem could be returned if it was found unacceptable. Later he was commissioned to write a poem to be set to music by the Master of the King's Musick, Sir Edward Elgar, and performed at the unveiling of the Queen Alexandra Memorial by the King on 8 June 1932. This was the ode "So Many True Princesses Who Have Gone".

"Sonnet"
Is there a great green commonwealth of Thought
Which ranks the yearly pageant, and decides
How Summer's royal progress shall be wrought,
By secret stir which in each plant abides?
Does rocking daffodil consent that she,
The snowdrop of wet winters, shall be first?
Does spotted cowslip with the grass agree
To hold her pride before the rattle burst?
And in the hedge what quick agreement goes,
When hawthorn blossoms redden to decay,
That Summer's pride shall come, the Summer's rose,
Before the flower be on the bramble spray?
Or is it, as with us, unresting strife,
And each consent a lucky gasp for life?

— "Sonnet", in The Story of a Round-House (1915)

After his appointment, Masefield was awarded the Order of Merit by King George V and many honorary degrees from British universities. In 1937 he was elected President of the Society of Authors. In 1938 he was awarded the Shakespeare Prize, one of the only two such awards made by the Hamburg-based Alfred Toepfer Foundation before the Second World War. Masefield encouraged the continued development of English literature and poetry, and began the annual awarding of the Royal Medals for Poetry for a first or second published edition of poems by a poet under the age of 35. Additionally, his speaking engagements called him further away, often on much longer tours, yet he still produced significant amounts of work in a wide variety of genres. To those he had already used he now added autobiography, producing New Chum, In the Mill, and So Long to Learn.

It was not until he was about 70 that Masefield slowed his pace, mainly due to illness. In 1960 Constance died aged 93, after a long illness. Although her death was heartrending, he had spent a tiring year watching the woman he loved die. He continued his duties as poet laureate. In Glad Thanksgiving, his last book, was published when he was 88 years old.

In late 1966 Masefield developed gangrene in his ankle. This spread to his leg and he died of the infection on 12 May 1967. In accordance with his stated wishes, he was cremated and his ashes were placed in Poets' Corner in Westminster Abbey. However, the following verse by Masefield was discovered later, addressed to his "Heirs, Administrators, and Assigns":

Let no religious rite be done or read
In any place for me when I am dead,
But burn my body into ash, and scatter
The ash in secret into running water,
Or on the windy down, and let none see;
And then thank God that there's an end of me.

== Legacy ==
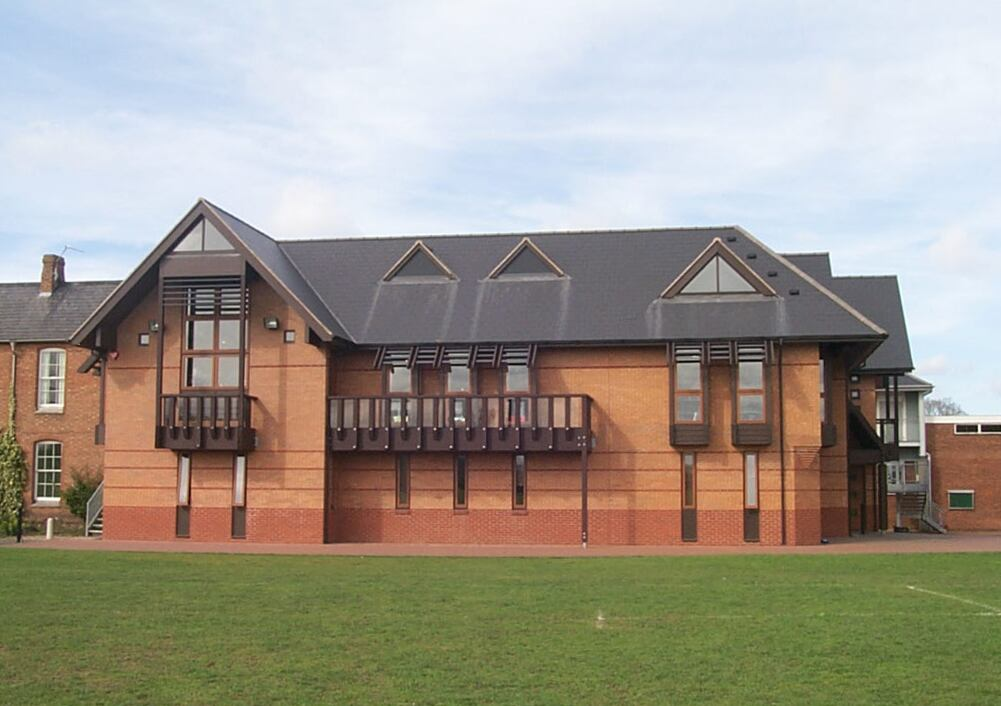
Masefield Centre (library and IT)

The Masefield Centre at Warwick School, which Masefield attended, and John Masefield High School in Ledbury, Herefordshire, have been named in his honour.

The Cheshire Home built on the site of his final home at Burcot, Oxfordshire is named after him.

Interest groups such as the John Masefield Society ensure the longevity of Masefield's opus. In 1977 Folkways Records released an album of readings of some of his poems, including some read by Masefield himself. Recordings preserved include Masefield's 1914 Good Friday.

=== Song settings ===
In addition to the commission for Queen Alexandra's Memorial Ode with music by Elgar, many of Masefield's short poems were set as art songs by British composers of the time. Best known by far is John Ireland's "Sea-Fever". Frederick Keel composed several songs drawn from the Salt-Water Ballads and elsewhere. Of these, "Trade Winds" was particularly popular in its day, despite the tongue-twisting challenges the text presents to the singer. Keel's defiant setting of "Tomorrow", written while interned at Ruhleben during World War I, was frequently programmed at the BBC Proms after the war. Another memorable wartime composition is Ivor Gurney's climactic declamation of "By a bierside", a setting quickly set down in 1916 during a brief spell behind the lines.

=== Selected works ===
==== Collections of poems ====
- Salt-Water Ballads (1902)
- Ballads (1903)
- Ballads and Poems (1910)
- The Everlasting Mercy (1911)
- The Widow in the Bye Street (1912)
- Dauber: A Poem (1912)
- The Story of a Round-House and Other Poems (1912)
- The Daffodil Fields (1913)
- Philip the King and Other Poems (1914)
- Salt-Water Poems and Ballads (1916)

Sonnets (1916)

- Sonnets and Poems (1916)
- Lollingdon Downs and Other Poems with Sonnets (1917)
- Rosas (1918)
- A Poem [Rosas] and Two Plays (1919)
- Reynard the Fox: or the Ghost Heath Run (1919)
- Animula [Limited to 250 copies] (1920)
- Enslaved and Other Poems (1920)

Right Royal (1920)

- King Cole (1921)
- Selected Poems (1922)
- The Dream [Illustrations by Judith Masefield, Limited Edition] (1922)
- King Cole and Other Poems (1923)
- The Collected Poems of John Masefield (1923)
- Poems (1925)
- Sonnets of Good Cheer to The Lena Ashwell Players (1926)
- Midsummer Night and Other Tales in Verse (1928)
- South and East [Illustrated by Jacynth Parsons, Limited to 2,750] (1929)
- Minnie Maylow's Story and Other Tales and Scenes (1931)
- A Tale of Troy (1932)
- A Letter from Pontus and Other Verse (1936)
- The Country Scene (With Pictures by Edward Seago) (1937)
- Tribute to Ballet (With Pictures by Edward Seago) (1938)
- Some Verses to Some Germans [10 Page Pamphlet] (1939)
- Gautama the Enlightened and Other Verse (1941)
- Natalie Maisie and Pavilastukay (1942)
- Land Workers [11 page Pamphlet] (1942)
- A Generation Risen [Illustrations by Edward Seago] (1943)
- Wonderings (Between One and Six Years) (1943)
- The Bullying of the Badger (1949)
- On the Hill (1949)
- The Story of Ossian [Long-playing record only] (1959)
- The Bluebells and Other Verses (1961)
- Old Raiger and Other Verses (1964)
- In Glad Thanksgiving (1966)

==== Prose fiction ====
- A Mainsail Haul (1905)
- A Tarpaulin Muster (short stories) (1907)
- Captain Margaret (1908)
- Multitude and Solitude (1909)
- Martin Hyde: The Duke's Messenger (1909)
- Lost Endeavour (Nelson, 1910).
- A Book of Discoveries (children's novel) (1910)
- The Street of Today (1911)
- Jim Davis (Wells Gardner, 1911).
- Sard Harker (Heinemann, 1924)
- ODTAA (1926)
- The Midnight Folk (children's novel) (1927)
- The Hawbucks (1929)
- The Bird of Dawning (Heinemann, 1933).
- The Taking of the Gry (1934)
- The Box of Delights: or When the Wolves Were Running (children's novel) (1935)
- Victorious Troy: or The Harrying Angel (1935)
- Eggs and Baker (1936)
- The Square Peg: or The Gun Fella (1937)
- Dead Ned (1938)
- Live and Kicking Ned (1939)
- Basilissa: A Tale of the Empress Theodora (1940)
- Conquer: A Tale of the Nika Rebellion in Byzantium (1941)
- Badon Parchments (1947)

==== Plays ====
- The Campden Wonder (1907)
- The Tragedy of Pompey the Great (1910)
- Philip the King (1914)
- The Locked Chest (1916)
- Good Friday: A Play in Verse (1916)
- The Tragedy of Nan (Originally known as Nan)
- A King's Daughter: A Tragedy in Verse (1923)
- The Trial of Jesus (1925)
- The Witch (1926) (trans. from the Norwegian play Anne Pedersdotter by Hans Wiers-Jenssen)
- Tristan and Isolt: A Play in Verse (1927)
- The Coming of Christ (1928)
- Easter: A Play for Singers (1929)

==== Non-fiction and autobiographical ====
- Sea Life in Nelson's Time (1905)
- Gallipoli (1916)
- The Old Front Line (1917)
- The Battle of the Somme (1919)
- The Wanderer of Liverpool (1930)
- Recent Prose (1924)
- Poetry: a Lecture Given at the Queen's Hall in London on Thursday, October 15, 1931
- The Conway: From Her Foundation to the Present Day (1933)
- Some Memories of W. B. Yeats (1940)
- "In the Mill" (1941)
- The Nine Days Wonder (The Operation Dynamo) (1941)
- New Chum (1944)
- So Long to Learn (autobiography) (1952)
- Grace Before Ploughing (autobiography) (Heinemann, 1966)
