= 1846 =

1846 in various calendars
- Gregorian calendar: 1846; MDCCCXLVI
- Ab urbe condita: 2599
- Armenian calendar: 1295; ԹՎ ՌՄՂԵ
- Assyrian calendar: 6596
- Baháʼí calendar: 2–3
- Balinese saka calendar: 1767–1768
- Bengali calendar: 1252–1253
- Berber calendar: 2796
- British Regnal year: 9 Vict. 1 – 10 Vict. 1
- Buddhist calendar: 2390
- Burmese calendar: 1208
- Byzantine calendar: 7354–7355
- Chinese calendar: 乙巳年 (Wood Snake); 4543 or 4336 — to — 丙午年 (Fire Horse); 4544 or 4337
- Coptic calendar: 1562–1563
- Discordian calendar: 3012
- Ethiopian calendar: 1838–1839
- Hebrew calendar: 5606–5607
- Hindu calendars
- Vikram Samvat: 1902–1903
- Shaka Samvat: 1767–1768
- Kali Yuga: 4946–4947
- Holocene calendar: 11846
- Igbo calendar: 846–847
- Iranian calendar: 1224–1225
- Islamic calendar: 1262–1263
- Japanese calendar: Kōka 3 (弘化３年)
- Javanese calendar: 1773–1774
- Julian calendar: Gregorian minus 12 days
- Korean calendar: 4179
- Minguo calendar: 66 before ROC 民前66年
- Nanakshahi calendar: 378
- Thai solar calendar: 2388–2389
- Tibetan calendar: ཤིང་མོ་སྦྲུལ་ལོ་ (female Wood-Snake); 1972 or 1591 or 819 — to — མེ་ཕོ་རྟ་ལོ་ (male Fire-Horse); 1973 or 1592 or 820

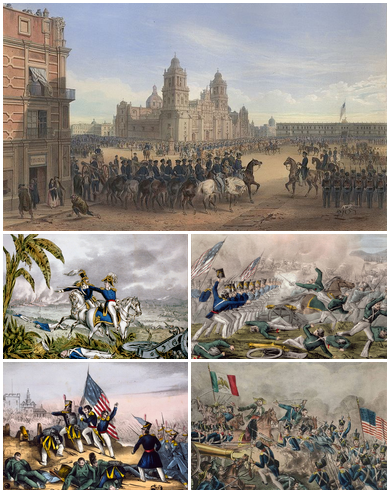
April 25: Mexican–American War begins.

1846 (MDCCCXLVI) was a common year starting on Thursday of the Gregorian calendar and a common year starting on Tuesday of the Julian calendar, the 1846th year of the Common Era (CE) and Anno Domini (AD) designations, the 846th year of the 2nd millennium, the 46th year of the 19th century, and the 7th year of the 1840s decade. As of the start of 1846, the Gregorian calendar was 12 days ahead of the Julian calendar, which remained in localized use until 1923.

== Events ==
=== January–March ===
- January 5 – The United States House of Representatives votes to stop sharing the Oregon Country with the United Kingdom.
- January 13 – The Milan–Venice railway's 3.2 km (2.0 mi) bridge, over the Venetian Lagoon between Mestre and Venice in Italy, opens, the world's longest since 1151.
- January 23 – Ahmad I ibn Mustafa, Bey of Tunis, declares the legal abolition of slavery in Tunisia.
- February 4 – Led by Brigham Young, many Mormons in the U.S. begin their migration west from Nauvoo, Illinois, to the Great Salt Lake in what becomes Utah.
- February 10 – First Anglo-Sikh war: Battle of Sobraon – British forces in India defeat the Sikhs.
- February 18 – The Galician Peasant Uprising of 1846 begins in Austria.
- February 19 – Texas annexation: United States president James K. Polk's annexation of the Republic of Texas is finalized by Texas president Anson Jones in a formal ceremony of transfer of sovereignty. The newly formed Texas state government is officially installed in Austin.
- February 20–March 3 – Kraków uprising: Polish nationalists stage an uprising in the Free City of Kraków; it is suppressed by forces of the Austrian Empire, supported by peasants.
- February 22 – The Liberty Bell in Philadelphia is cracked while being rung for George Washington's birthday.
- March 9 – The First Anglo-Sikh war ends with the signing of the Treaty of Lahore. Kashmir is ceded to the British East India Company, and the Koh-i-Noor diamond is surrendered to Queen Victoria.
- March 10 – Prince Osahito, fourth son of deceased Emperor Ninkō of Japan, becomes Emperor Kōmei.

=== April–June ===
- April 25 – Mexican–American War: Open conflict begins, over the disputed border of Texas.
- May – The Associated Press is founded in New York.
- May 8 – Mexican–American War – Battle of Palo Alto: Zachary Taylor defeats a Mexican force north of the Rio Grande at Palo Alto, Texas in the first major battle of the war.
- May 11 – The University at Buffalo is founded by future United States Vice President and President, Millard Fillmore.
- May 13 – Mexican–American War: The United States declares war on Mexico.
- May 15 – Under the leadership of Prime Minister Robert Peel, the House of Commons of the United Kingdom votes to repeal the Corn Laws by passing an Importation Bill, replacing the old colonial mercantile trade system with free trade in response to the Great Famine (Ireland). On June 25 the Duke of Wellington persuades the House of Lords to pass the Act, which will take full effect from February 1849. Peel, however, is forced to resign.
- May 16 – The Revolution of Maria da Fonte begins in Portugal. It will be by royalist troops on February 22, 1847.
- June 10 – Mexican–American War: The California Republic declares independence from Mexico.
- June 14 – Bear Flag Revolt: American settlers in Sonoma, California, start a rebellion against Mexico and proclaim the California Republic.
- June 15
  - The Oregon Treaty establishes the 49th parallel as the border between the United States and Canada, from the Rocky Mountains to the Strait of Juan de Fuca.
  - Launceston Church Grammar School opens for the first time in Tasmania.
- June 16 – Pope Pius IX succeeds Pope Gregory XVI as the 255th pope. He will reign for 31½ years (the longest definitely confirmed).
- June 28 – The saxophone is patented by Adolphe Sax.

=== July–September ===
- July 7 – Mexican–American War: Battle of Monterey – Acting on instructions from Washington, D.C., Commodore John Drake Sloat orders his troops to occupy Monterey and Yerba Buena, thus beginning the United States annexation of California.
- August 22 – The Second Federal Republic of Mexico is established.
- August 28 – The New Zealand Constitution Act 1846 is passed by the Parliament of the United Kingdom with the intention of granting self-government to the British colony. Governor George Grey suspends implementation of the majority of the Act, with the exception of the creation of New Ulster and New Munster Provinces, and it is superseded by the New Zealand Constitution Act 1852.
- August – Canadian physician and geologist Abraham Pineo Gesner demonstrates a process to refine a liquid fuel, which he calls kerosene, from coal, bitumen or oil shale.
- September 3 – Electric Telegraph Company founded in Britain.
- September 7 – The portion of the District of Columbia in the United States that was ceded by Virginia in 1790 is re-ceded to Virginia.
- September 10 – Elias Howe is awarded the first United States patent for a sewing machine, using a lockstitch design.
- September 12 – Poets Elizabeth Barrett and Robert Browning marry privately in London, departing a week later for the continent.
- September 14 – Jang Bahadur and his brothers massacre about 40 members of the Nepalese palace court.
- September 19 – Our Lady of La Salette, a Marian apparition, is said to have been seen by two children at La Salette-Fallavaux in France.
- September 23 – Discovery of Neptune: The planet is observed for the first time by German astronomers Johann Gottfried Galle and Heinrich Louis d'Arrest, as predicted by British astronomer John Couch Adams and French astronomer Urbain Le Verrier.
- September – The Second Carlist War (or the War of the Matiners or Madrugadores) begins in Spain.

=== October–December ===
- October 1
  - Christ College, Tasmania, opens with the hope that it will develop along the lines of an Oxbridge college, and provide the basis for university education in Tasmania. By the 21st century it will be the oldest tertiary institution in Australia.
  - Triton, Neptune's largest moon, is discovered by William Lassell 17 days after the discovery of Neptune.
- October 16 – At Massachusetts General Hospital, Dr. William T. G. Morton, a dentist, gives the first successful public demonstration of ether anesthesia.
- November 4 – The Donner Party, a wagon train of 87 settlers traveling to California, is stranded in the Sierra Nevada mountains by the first of several snowstorms. By the time a relief party reaches the starving settlers three months later, only 48 survivors are left, many of whom have survived by cannibalism.
- November 9 – Pope Pius IX issues the encyclical Qui pluribus, in response to the growing trend of agnosticism among intellectuals in Europe.
- November 17 – Carl Zeiss, a major worldwide optoelectronics and digital camera brand, is founded in Thuringia, Germany.
- December 22 – The Guild system in Sweden is abolished by the Fabriks och Handtwerksordning and Handelsordningen, and trade and handicrafts permits are granted to every male and female applicant of legal majority.
- December 24 – Great Britain acquires Labuan from the Sultanate of Brunei.
- December 28 – Iowa is admitted as the 29th U.S. state.

=== Date unknown ===
- 1846–1860 cholera pandemic breaks out in south Asia; in the United Kingdom, Parliament passes The Nuisances Removal and Diseases Prevention Act.
- The Great Famine continues in Ireland. The first deaths from hunger take place early in the year and Phytophthora infestans almost totally destroys the summer potato crop.
- Fort Wayne Female College is founded in Indiana as a Methodist institution; it will later be renamed Taylor University.
- The first higher school of academic learning for women in Denmark, Den højere Dannelsesanstalt for Damer, is founded in Copenhagen.

== Births ==
=== January–June ===
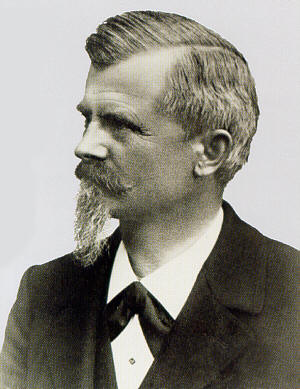
Wilhelm Maybach

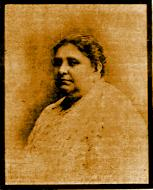
Rita Cetina Gutiérrez

- January 5
  - Mariam Baouardy, Syrian Melkite Greek Catholic nun, canonized (d. 1878)
  - Rudolf Christoph Eucken, German writer, Nobel Prize laureate (d. 1926)
- January 26 – Henry Foster, Australian politician (d. 1902)
- February 2 – Francis Marion Smith, American borax magnate (d. 1931)
- February 9 – Wilhelm Maybach, German automobile designer (d. 1929)
- February 18 – Wilson Barrett, English actor (d. 1904)
- February 26 – William F. "Buffalo Bill" Cody, American frontiersman, later showman (d. 1917)
- March 4 – Franklin J. Drake, American admiral (d. 1929)
- March 6 – Henry Radcliffe Crocker, English dermatologist (d. 1909)
- March 9 – Ōdera Yasuzumi, Japanese general (d. 1895)
- March 24 – Karl von Bülow, German field marshal (d. 1921)
- April 4 – Comte de Lautréamont, French writer (d. 1870)
- May 3 – Sir Edmund Elton, 8th Baronet, English inventor, studio potter (d. 1920)
- May 5 – Henryk Sienkiewicz, Polish author, Nobel Prize laureate (d. 1916)
- May 20 – Alexander von Kluck, German general (d. 1934)
- May 22 – Rita Cetina Gutiérrez, Mexican teacher, poet and activist (d. 1908)
- May 25 – Princess Helena of the United Kingdom (d. 1923)
- May 29 – Winfield Scott Edgerly, United States Brigadier General (d. 1927)
- June 11 – William Louis Marshall, American general, engineer (d. 1920)
- June 13 – Rose Cleveland, de facto First Lady of the United States (d. 1918)
- June 27 – Charles Stewart Parnell, Irish political leader (d. 1891)

=== July–December ===
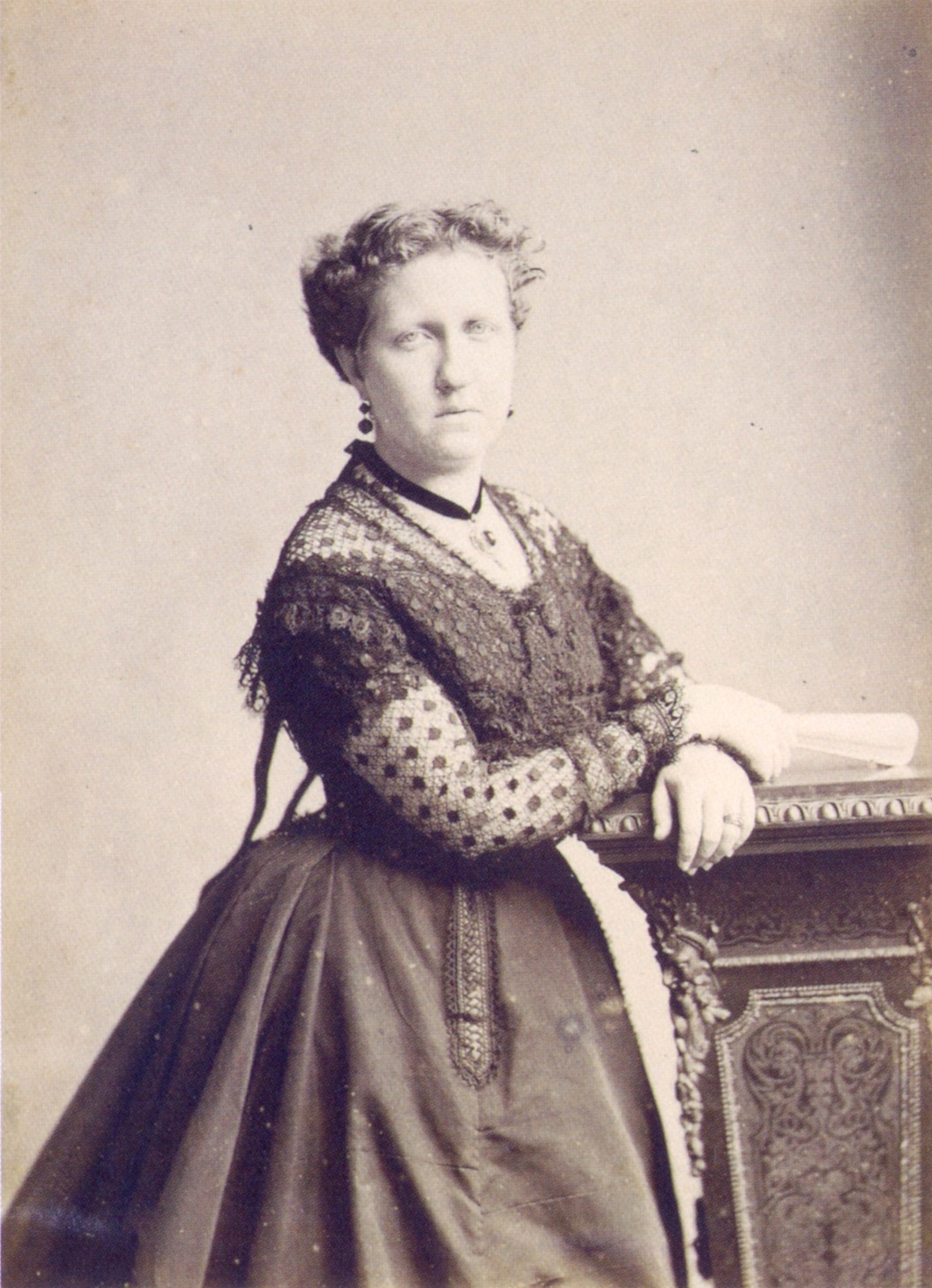
Isabel, Princess Imperial of Brazil

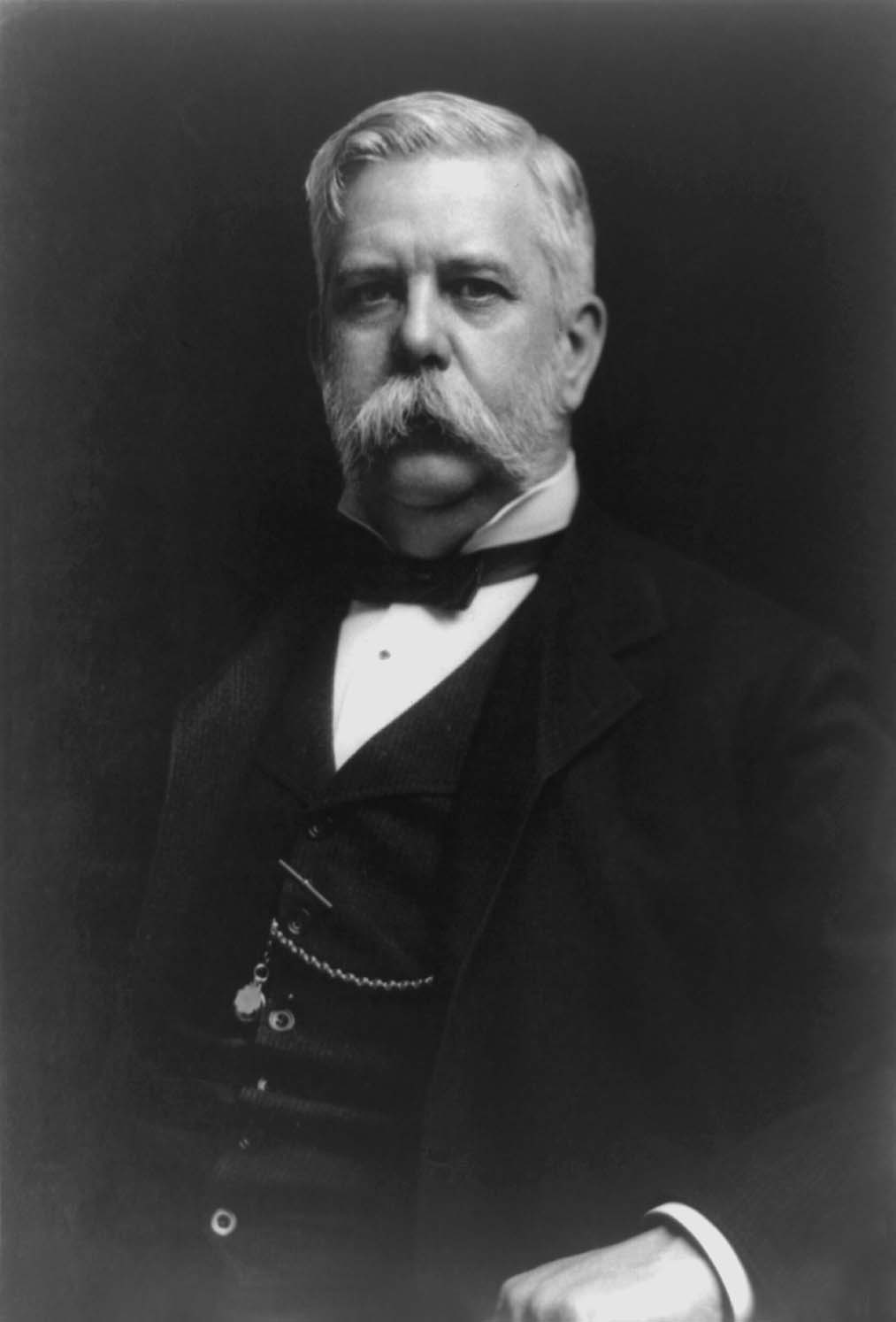
George Westinghouse

- July 8 – John Mills "Private John" Allen, American lawyer and politician (d. 1917)
- July 11 – Gertrude Abbott (Mother Abbott), founder of the former St Margaret's Hospital in Sydney, Australia (d. 1934)
- July 17 – Tokugawa Iemochi, 14th shōgun of the Tokugawa shogunate of Japan (d. 1866)
- July 26 – Texas Jack Omohundro, American frontier scout, actor, and cowboy (d. 1880)
- July 29 – Isabel, Princess Imperial of Brazil (d. 1921)
- August 8 – William White Miller, Irish Canadian businessman (d. 1912)
- August 16 – Oskar Victorovich Stark, Russian admiral and explorer (d. 1928)
- August 18 – Robley D. Evans, American admiral (d. 1912)
- August 23 – Alexander Milne Calder, American sculptor (d. 1923)
- September 7 – John Porter Merrell, American admiral (d. 1916)
- September 16 – Anna Kingsford, British spiritual writer, doctor, feminist and pioneering vegetarian (d. 1888)
- September 25
  - Watson Heston, American cartoonist (d. 1905)
  - Wladimir Köppen, Russian-German geographer, climatologist (d. 1940)
- October 1 – Nectarios of Aegina, Greek metropolitan and saint (d. 1920)
- October 6 – George Westinghouse, American entrepreneur, engineer (d. 1914)
- November 25 – Carrie Nation, American temperance advocate (d. 1911)
- December 2 – Pierre Waldeck-Rousseau, 29th Prime Minister of France (d. 1904)
- December 17 – Max von Hausen, German general (d. 1922)
- December 21 – Julia Lermontova, Russian chemist (d. 1919)

=== Date unknown ===
- Jeanne Schmahl, British-born French feminist (d. 1915)

== Deaths ==
=== January–June ===
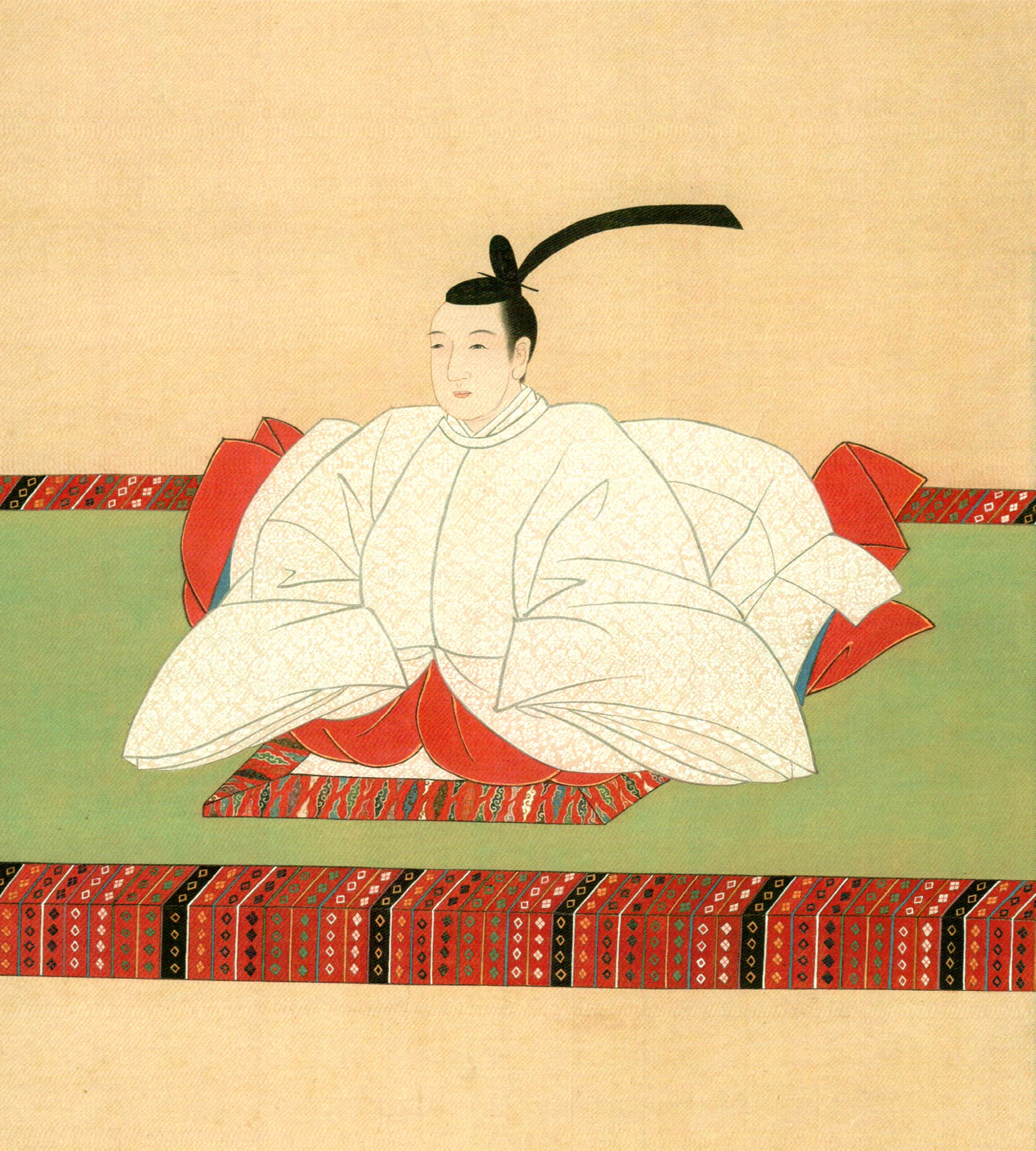
Emperor Ninkō

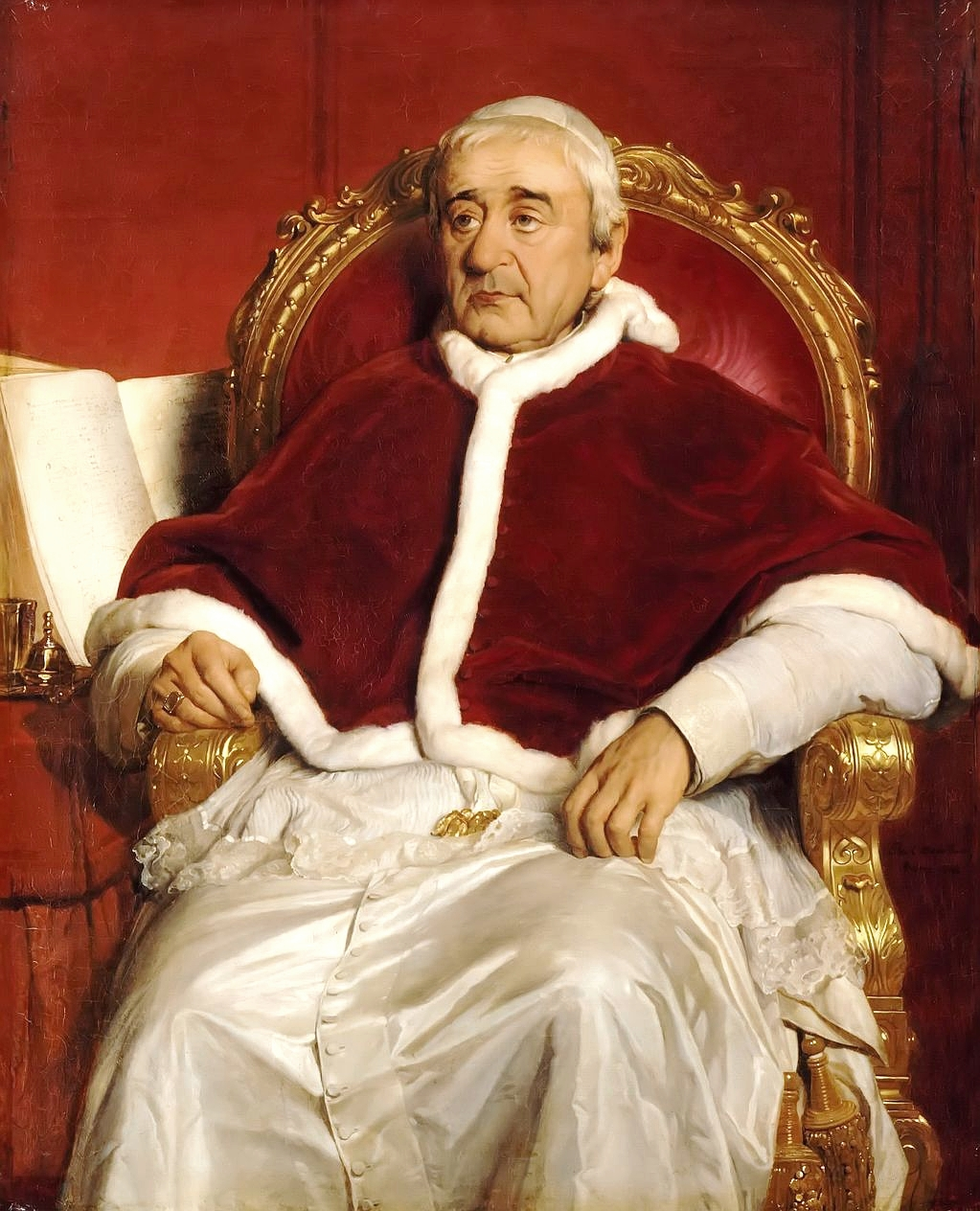
Pope Gregory XVI

- February 21 – Emperor Ninkō of Japan (b. 1800)
- February 27 – María Trinidad Sánchez, heroine of the Dominican War of Independence (b. 1794)
- March 17 – Friedrich Bessel, German mathematician and astronomer (b. 1784)
- May 11 – Jane Irwin Harrison, de facto First Lady of the United States (b. 1804)
- May 12 – Sir Robert Otway, British admiral (b. 1770)
- May 23 – Franciszek Ksawery Drucki-Lubecki, Polish politician (b. 1778)
- June 1 – Pope Gregory XVI (b. 1765)
- June 8 – Rodolphe Töpffer, Swiss author, painter, and caricature artist (b. 1799)
- June 13 – Jean-Baptiste Benoît Eyriès, French geographer, author and translator (b. 1767)

=== July–December ===
- August 5 – Dorothy Thomas, Caribbean entrepreneur and former slave (b. 1756)
- August 16
  - Samuel Humphreys, American naval architect (b. 1778)
  - Sylvain Charles Valée, Marshal of France (b. 1773)
- September 14 – Jacques Dupré, Louisiana State Representative, State Senator, and Governor (b. 1773)
- September 23 – John Ainsworth Horrocks, English-born explorer of South Australia (b. 1818)
- September 26 – Thomas Clarkson, English abolitionist (b. 1760)
- October 2 – Benjamin Waterhouse, American physician, medical professor (b. 1754)
- October 15 – Bagyidaw, Burmese king (b. 1784)
- November 6
  - Alexander Chavchavadze, Georgian Romantic poet, military figure (b. 1786)
  - Karol Marcinkowski, Polish physician, social activist (b. 1800)
- November 11 – José Escolástico Marín, Salvadoran politician
- November 12 – William Findlay, American politician (b. 1768)
- December 18 – Emilie Högquist, Swedish dramatic star (b. 1812)
- December 29 – Mateli Magdalena Kuivalatar, Finnish-Karelian folk singer (b. 1777)

=== Date unknown ===
- Maria Medina Coeli, Italian physician (b. 1764)
