= Bach-Elgar Choir =

Choir based in Ontario, Canada

- Origin: Hamilton, Ontario Canada
- Genres: Classical music, Choir, Operetta
- Years active: 1905-present
- Website: https://bachelgar.ca/

The Bach-Elgar Choir is a community chorus of long standing in Hamilton, Ontario, currently directed by Alexander Cann. The Choir is composed of accomplished amateur singers from Hamilton and the neighbouring cities of Burlington, Oakville, Mississauga and Simcoe. Notable performances by the ensemble include the North American première of Verdi's Requiem and the Canadian premieres of Górecki's Miserere and Mahler's Symphony No. 2 (the Resurrection). The choir has performed at Roy Thomson Hall in Toronto, The Sanderson Centre in Brantford (with the Buffalo Philharmonic Orchestra), and at the Brott Music Festival in Hamilton. The choir makes frequent guest appearances with the Hamilton Philharmonic Orchestra.

== History ==
The Bach-Elgar Choir was founded by Bruce Carey in 1905 under the name the Elgar Choir. The choir was subsequently conducted by G. Roy Fenwick, W. H. Hewlett, and Edward Stewart. The choir disbanded for a few years during World War II, and reformed in 1947, joining with another disbanded amateur chorus, the Bach Choir (founded 1931 by Graham Godfrey), to form the renamed Bach-Elgar Choir. The Bach-Elgar Choir made its debut in 1947 in Handel's Messiah under Charles Peaker at Hamilton's Centenary United Church.

The choir began by presenting a subscription series of three to four concerts per year at Centenary United Church. Cyril Hampshire conducted the choir from 1948 to 1955, John Sidgwick from 1955 to 1960, Frank Thorolfson from 1960 to 1962, and Charles Wilson from 1962 to 1974. The concert series was moved to Central Presbyterian Church during the 1960s. In 1969 Wilson founded a 36-voice subsidiary choir, the Bach Elgar Chamber Singers; they performed small concerts in Hamilton and southern Ontario for a number of years.

During the 1970s and 1980s, the choir continued its concert series at Christ's Church Cathedral, with Donald Kendrick conducting from 1974 to 1978 and from 1981 to 1983, Philip David Morehead from 1978 to 1980, and Denise Narcisse-Mair from 1980 to 1981.

In 1981, the Bach Elgar Children's Chorus was founded.

The choir continued under Gerald Fagan from 1983 to 1984. By 1986, the choir had 95 members. Wayne Strongman conducted the choir from 1984 to 1997; in the 1990s, concerts were performed at Toronto's Rosedale United Church, and at Hamilton Place (now FirstOntario Concert Hall), where it has been a resident ensemble since 1975. Philip Sarabura became conductor in 1998, and Ian Sadler from 2000 to 2005. Concerts have been held at Melrose United Church since 2006. Howard Dyck was artistic director from 2006 to 2010, and Alexander Cann has been the artistic director since 2010.

In 2018, the choir presented a series of concerts with the best-known songs from Gilbert and Sullivan operettas.

Since then, the choir presented Fritz Lang's 1927 film Metropolis, with an invented choral soundtrack, and Space Journey, a live choral work, including Vierne’s Messe solennelle accompanying Mark Bochsler‘s film of high-resolution imagery of the Solar System and beyond from the Voyager space probes and James Webb Space Telescope.

The 2024-25 season includes Alexander's Feast, by Handel; Handel's Messiah; and The Trial of Gilbert and Sullivan, scenes from Gilbert & Sullivan's satire, Trial by Jury.
