= Udo Kasemets =

Estonian composer and conductor

- Born: November 16, 1919; Tallinn, Estonia
- Died: January 19, 2014 (aged 94) Toronto, Ontario, Canada
- Genres: Classical music, Experimental music, Avant-garde music
- Occupations: Composer, teacher, writer, conductor, pianist

Udo Kasemets (November 16, 1919 – January 19, 2014) was an Estonian Canadian composer of orchestral, chamber, vocal, piano and electroacoustic works. He was one of the first composers to adopt the methods of John Cage, and was also a conductor, lecturer, pianist, organist, teacher and writer.

Kasemets was born in Tallinn, Estonia, and trained at the Tallinn Conservatory and the Akademie der Musik in Stuttgart. In 1950, he attended the Kranichstein Institut für neue Musik in Darmstadt, where he became familiar with the music and philosophies of Ernst Krenek, Hermann Scherchen and Edgard Varèse. He emigrated to Canada in 1951, and became a Canadian citizen in 1957.

From the 1950s, Kasemets was active in Hamilton and Toronto in Canada. He taught at the Royal Hamilton College of Music and served as conductor of the Hamilton Conservatory Chorus until 1957. He was music critic for the Toronto Daily Star 1959–63 and taught at the Brodie School of Music and Modern Dance 1963–67.

In 1962–63, he organized Toronto's first new music series Men, Minds and Music, and established the Isaacs Gallery Mixed Media Concerts. In 1968, he directed the first Toronto Festival of Arts and Technology entitled SightSoundSystems and founded and edited a new music publication series, Canavangard. In 1971, Kasemets joined the Faculty of the Department of Experimental Art at the Ontario College of Art, where he taught until retiring in 1987.

He received an honorary doctorate from York University in 1991.

Kasemets' significant influences include Erik Satie, Marcel Duchamp, James Joyce, John Cage, James Tenney, Morton Feldman, Merce Cunningham, Buckminster Fuller, and Stephen Hawking. Other strong influences especially evident in his later work include the Chinese I Ching and fractal music.

Kasemets died in Toronto on January 19, 2014.

== Selected recorded works ==
- Requiem Renga, for the Victims of Wars and Violence in Our Time (1992) for fifteen strings and two percussionists, based on the Japanese renga chain poetry form. Koch International Classics – 3-7165-2H1
- Palestrina on Devil's Staircase, with Dis(Con)sonant Contrapuntal Connections (1993) for three violins, three cellos, and two sopranos, music based on the eponymous fractal and also commemorating the 400th anniversary of Palestrina's death in 1994. Koch International Classics – 3-7165-2H1
- The Eight Houses of the I-Ching (1993) for twelve strings. Koch International Classics – 3-7165-2H1
