= J. E. P. Aldous =

John Edmund Paul Aldous

Background information
- Born: December 8, 1853; Sheffield, England
- Died: January 23, 1934 (aged 80) Hamilton, Ontario, Canada
- Occupations: Musician, conductor, composer
- Instrument: Organ

John Edmund Paul Aldous (8 December 1853 – 23 January 1934) was a Canadian organist, conductor, composer, and music educator of English birth. His compositional output includes many short pieces for piano, organ, choir, and voice. He also composed four operettas: Ptarmigan or A Canadian Carnival (published 1895), A Golden Catch, Nancy or All for Love, and The Poster Girl (published 1902). Some of his better-known works are Prelude and Fugue for organ, the choral works Grant, We Beseech Thee, Merciful Lord and Blessed Are the Dead That Die in the Lord, and the hymn Egypt, all of which have been reprinted several times.

== Life and career ==
Born in Sheffield, Aldous began his career as the organist at the chapel of the British Embassy in Paris. In 1876, he earned his BA in Trinity College. He emigrated to Canada in 1877 at the age of 23 to assume the post of organist-choirmaster at Central Presbyterian Church in Hamilton, Ontario. He left there a few years later to assume a succession of similar church posts, first in St. Thomas, Ontario and then in Hamilton at St Mark's and St Thomas' churches. In 1884 he returned to Central Presbyterian where he remained for several years.

Aldous founded the Hamilton Orchestral Club, one of the city's earliest orchestras, in 1884, serving as the ensemble's first conductor. From 1882 to 1885 he served as the head of the music program at Brantford Ladies' College and from 1885 to 1888 he worked in the same capacity at Woodstock Baptist College. In 1898 he founded the Hamilton School of Music, serving as the school's first director from 1889 to 1908. He also taught on the faculty of the Royal Hamilton College of Music of which he became co-director with Bruce Carey and W. H. Hewlett in 1907. His notable pupils included Mona Bates and Ada Kent.

In 1890 Aldous became the conductor of the Hamilton Philharmonic Society after the departure of Clarence Lucas. In 1894 he was appointed president of the Canadian Society of Musicians and in 1896 he became an examiner at the University of Toronto. He also contributed articles to the Organist's Quarterly Journal and The Violin during his career. He died in 1934 in Hamilton at the age of 80.
