= Edith Miller =

Edith Miller may refer to:

- Edith Starr Miller (1887–1933), socialite, author, conspiracy theorist, and anti-Mormon agitator
- Edith Jane Miller (1875–1936), concert contralto singer
