= Ada Kent =

Canadian music educator (1888–1969)

Ada Kent LRAM
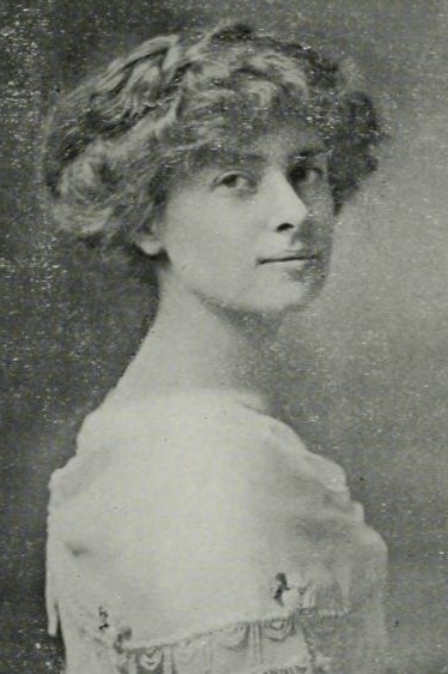
- Ada Twohy, later Kent, from a 1913 publication
- Born: Ada Jane Fairlane Twohy; 8 February 1888; Denver, Colorado, U.S.
- Died: 23 July 1969 (aged 81); London, U.K.
- Occupations: Musician, composer, music educator
- Spouse: William George Kent
- Children: 2

Ada Twohy Kent (8 February 1888 – 23 July 1969) was a Canadian musician, composer, and music educator. She was described as "probably Canada's most successful woman composer" in a 1943 profile.

== Early life and education ==
Ada Jane Fairlane Twohy was born in Denver, Colorado, the daughter of William Humphrey Twohy and Ada Lutz Twohy. Her parents were both Canadian. Her piano teachers included J. E. P. Aldous and A. S. Vogt. She earned a bachelor's degree in music at the University of Toronto in 1906, at age 18, and an LRAM from the Royal Academy of Music in London.

== Career ==
Kent was a pianist and composer from her teens, and a music educator. In Hamilton, Ontario, she was a church organist beginning in her teens, and taught at the Hamilton School of Music. She was also a church organist in Toronto, where she taught at the Toronto Conservatory of Music, and at Moulton Ladies' College. She toured as accompanist for the Canadian Mendelssohn Choir. In 1938, she gave a recital of her own works at London's Wigmore Hall. She gave a similar program in 1939, at the Prince Edward Hotel in Windsor.

Kent composed works for piano, violin, and voice, and wrote several books of songs for children. She often used texts by Canadian writers as the lyrics of her songs. "Ada Twohy Kent has the precious gift of melodic sense," wrote a reviewer in 1937, about her first book of songs. "There's a simple vigor and often a lyric enchantment in these songs that entirely ignores sad or gloomy suggestions."

== Publications ==
- Sing a Song of Canada (1937, with Charlotte McCoy and Anne Sutherland Brooks)
- "16 Variations on an English Theme"
- "No Flower So Fair" (1940)
- Let's Pretend and Thirty Other Songs for Children (1943)
- Tip Toe Tunes for Tiny Tots (1952)

== Personal life ==
Ada Twohy married William George Kent in 1918. They had two children. Her husband died in 1955, and she died in 1969, at the age of 81, in London.
