= Peaker =

Peaker may refer to:

- Peaking power plant
- Brian Peaker, Canadian rower
- Charles Peaker (1899–1978), Canadian organist
- E. J. Peaker, American actress
- 14595 Peaker, a main-belt asteroid
