= W. H. Hewlett =

Canadian organist, conductor, composer and music educator

William Henry Hewlett (16 January 1873 – 13 June 1940) was a Canadian organist, conductor, composer, and music educator of English birth.

== Early life and education ==
Born in Batheaston, Hewlett was a treble in the choir at Bath Abbey as a boy. In 1884, at the age of 11, he emigrated to Canada where his family ultimately settled in Toronto, Ontario. As a teenager he studied at the Toronto Conservatory of Music (TCM) where he graduated with the gold medal for organ performance in 1893. Among his teachers were Francesco D'Auria (orchestration), Arthur Elwell Fisher (music theory), Albert Ham (music theory), and A. S. Vogt (piano and organ). He later went to Europe to pursue advanced studies with pianist Ernst Jedliczka and composer Hans Pfitzner in Berlin, and in London with pianist Vladimir Cernikoff.

== Career ==
While a student at the TCM, Hewlett held the post of organist-choirmaster at Carlton St Methodist Church from 1890 to 1895. In 1894 he co-founded the Toronto Mendelssohn Choir, serving as the ensemble's served first accompanist from 1895 to 1897. In 1895 he moved to London, Ontario to assume the position of organist-choirmaster at Dundas Centre Methodist Church. From 1896 to 1902 he was the conductor of the London Vocal Society. Around this time he also served as accompanist for singers Ernestine Schumann-Heink and Dame Clara Butt in their Canadian recital tours.

In 1902, Hewlett relocated to Hamilton to assume the position of music director at Centenary Methodist Church where he remained until 1938. In 1907 he, along with J. E. P. Aldous and Bruce Carey, became co-director of the Royal Hamilton College of Music. He became sole director in 1918, a position he held until 1939. From 1922 to 1936 he served as the conductor of the Bach-Elgar Choir, often leading the ensemble in performances with the Cleveland Orchestra. In 1927 he conducted a concert celebrating the 60th anniversary of the Canadian Confederation with a 1000-voice choir. In 1928 to 1929 he was president of the Royal Canadian College of Organists. He was also active as an adjudicator and examiner throughout Canada during his career. He died in Bronte, Ontario in 1940.
