= Frederick C. Silvester =

British organist and composer

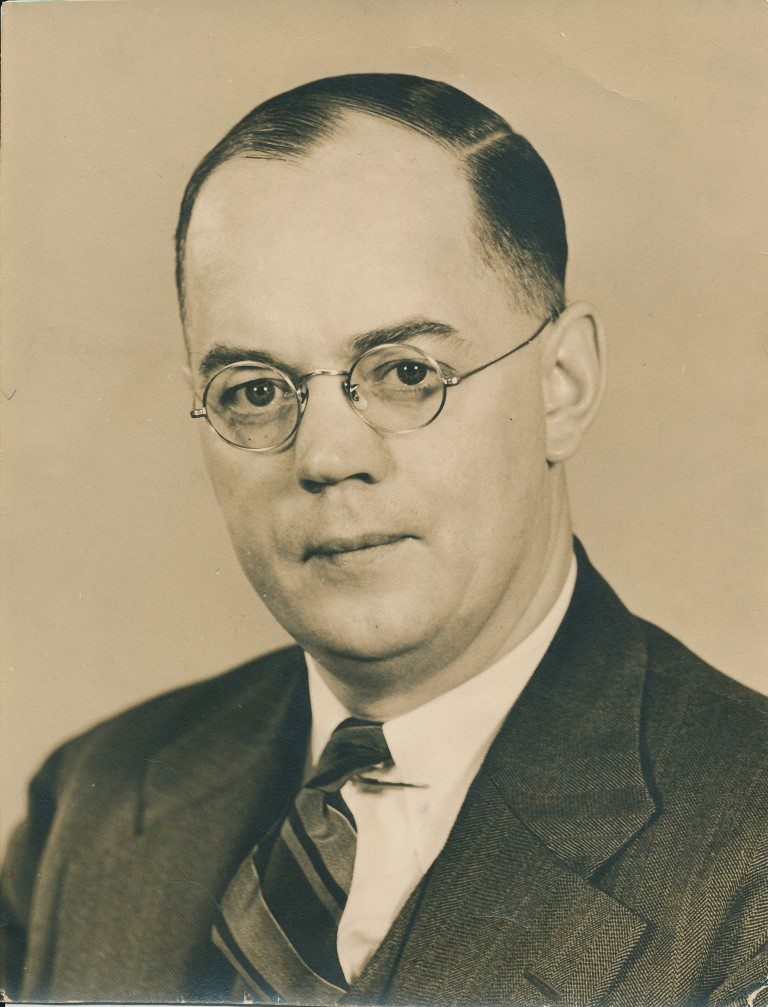

Background information
- Born: 1901
- Died: 1966
- Occupation(s): Organist, composer

Frederick C. Silvester (1901–1966) was a British organist and composer.

== Life ==
Silvester studied organ with C. Spencer Heap in England and after moving to Canada in 1921, with Lynnwood Farnam in Saskatoon. During his eight years there, he was organist at the First Baptist Church and Knox United Church. He moved to Toronto in 1929, studied at the TCM with MacMillan (organ) and Willan (theory and composition), and was organist from 1931-1938 at the Church of the Messiah and from 1938-1966, he was at Bloor Street United Church, where he led the choir in many large works. At the TCM he served at first, 1929–1946, as registrar of examinations, and then from 1946–1966, as registrar. He gave organ recitals in many parts of Canada and on the CBC and was president 1945-1947 of the CCO. He was also assistant conductor and coach from 1942-1957, and conductor 1957-1960, of the Toronto Mendelssohn Choir. Of his work with the choir, George Kidd wrote, 'The overall effect is one of good discipline, a clear understanding, and a sincerity that spreads itself over all sections'.

Silvester wrote a number of short choral works (published by Harris) and songs (published by Western). His chorale Prelude on Rockingham has been recorded by Eric Robertson.

== Legacy ==
Silvester is credited with being the organ teacher of Glenn Gould (1942–1949).
