= Charles Wilson (composer) =

Canadian composer (1931–2019)

Charles Mills Wilson (8 May 1931 – 13 June 2019) was a Canadian composer, choral conductor, and music educator.

== Early life and education ==
Wilson was born in Toronto, Ontario. He began studying piano at age six with Wilfred Powell and later studied organ with Charles Peaker. He studied composition with Godfrey Ridout at the University of Toronto, earning a Bachelor of Music in 1952 and a Doctor of Music degree in Composition in 1956. While at the University of Toronto, Wilson also studied at the Berkshire Music Center, at Tanglewood, during the summers with Lukas Foss, Aaron Copland and Carlos Chávez. He became interested in choral music and spent much of his time studying choral conducting. In 1953, Wilson taught music theory and conducted the University Chorale at the University of Saskatchewan while simultaneously finishing his doctoral thesis/composition, Symphony in A.

== Career ==
From 1954-1964 Wilson served as the organist and choirmaster at Chalmer United Church in Guelph, Ontario. While there he founded the Guelph Light Opera and Oratorio Company (later the Guelph Opera and Concert Singers) in 1955, conducting their performances until 1974. During these years he conducted choirs and bands and taught high school in the Guelph area and was for a time music supervisor of Guelph Township public schools.

Wilson also conducted the Bach-Elgar Choir of Hamilton from 1962–1974. In 1971 he received a Canada Council grant to create a multimedia work. He was the choirmaster of the Canadian Opera Company from 1973–1981. In 1979 he was appointed to the faculty of music at the University of Guelph where he later became composer-in-residence and the director of the electronic music studio. He retired in 1994.

== Compositions ==
As a composer, Wilson is known for employing a range of musical idioms while maintaining a strong emotional lyricism and sense of tonality. His early compositions were primarily instrumental chamber music while his latter output has been more focused on vocal music including operas, choral works, and art songs. He has written one oratorio, The Angels of the Earth (1966) and numerous operas. His opera Héloise and Abelard (1972) was commissioned by the Canadian Opera Company to mark its 25th anniversary and his opera Psycho Red (1977) was commissioned by the Guelph Spring Festival. His other operas include The Selfish Giant (1973), The Summoning of Everyman (1973), and Kamouraska (1975).

Wilson has also composed works for the Canadian Children's Opera Chorus, the Festival Singers of Canada, the Canadian Brass, and Dalhousie University. He is an associate of the Canadian Music Centre.

== Sources ==
- Elaine Keillor. The New Grove Dictionary of Opera, edited by Stanley Sadie (1992), ISBN 0-333-73432-7 and ISBN 1-56159-228-5
- The Oxford Dictionary of Opera, by John Warrack and Ewan West (1992), ISBN 0-19-869164-5
