= Albert Visetti =

Italian composer

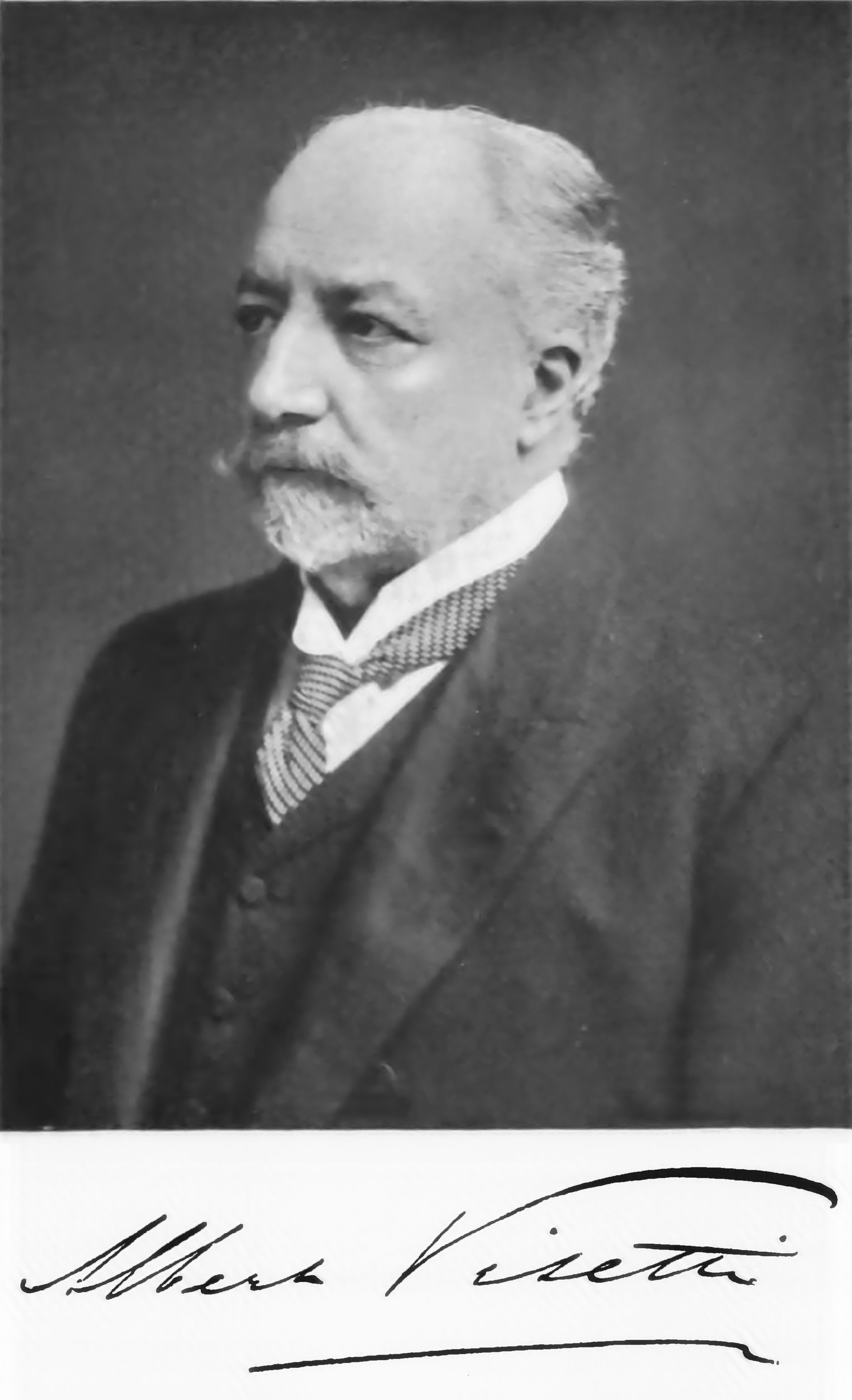
Albert Visetti in 1913

Albert Anthony Visetti (13 May 1846–10 July 1928) was a Dalmatian musician who moved to London where he was Professor of Singing at the Royal College of Music, becoming a Fellow in 1921. He was the stepfather of the novelist Radclyffe Hall.

== Early life ==
Born in Solin in Dalmatia to a landowner Italian father and an English mother, Visetti was originally intended by his father for a career as a surgeon so was sent to the University of Padua to study medicine. Affected by the sights of the dissecting room, he withdrew and turned instead to music. He was awarded musical scholarships from the Austrian and Italian governments. He studied music at the Milan Conservatory where a friend was Arrigo Boito who wrote the libretto for Visetti's Cantico des Cantici, and where he was a pupil of Alberto Mazzucato in class composition, winning several awards. While there he made the acquaintance of Verdi. Visetti was later engaged as a conductor at Nice before moving to Paris where he was an assistant to the composer Daniel Auber at the Court of Napoleon III. While in Paris, he composed the opera Les Trois Mousquetaires after he met Alexandre Dumas, who wrote the libretto. However, the almost complete manuscript was destroyed in a fire during the Siege of Paris.

== Move to London ==
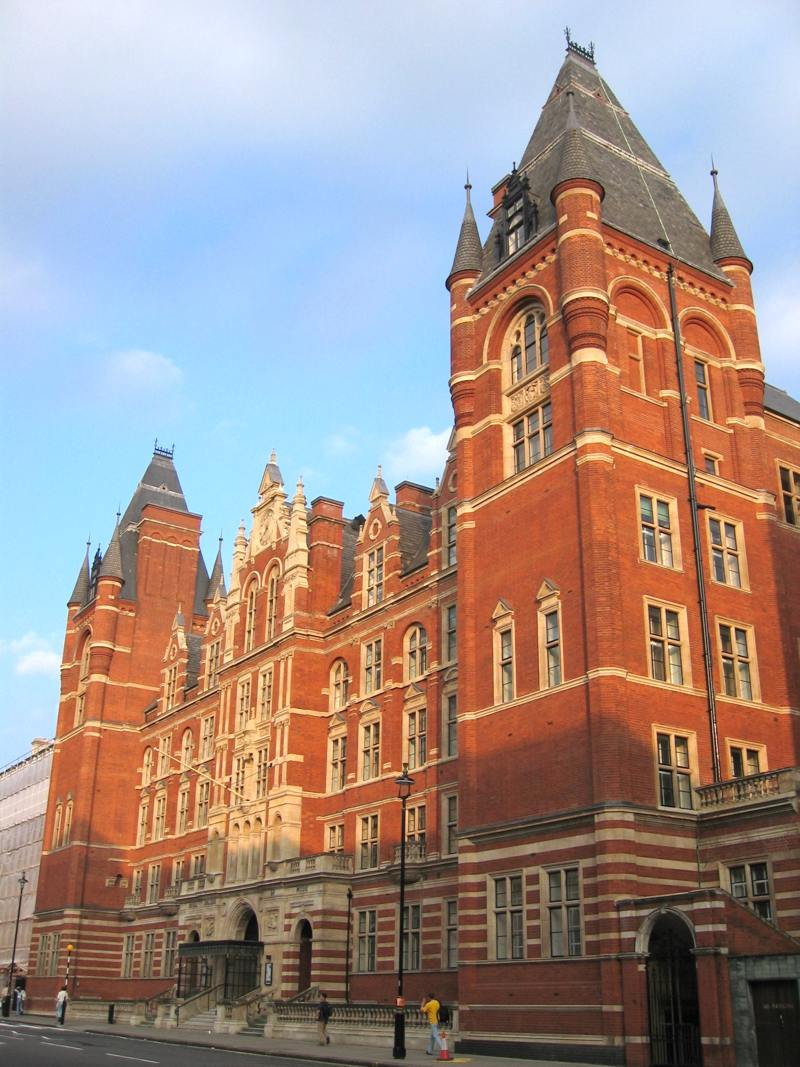
The Royal College of Music, where Visetti was Professor of Singing

Visetti moved to England in May 1871 after the turmoil of the Siege of Paris, living there for the rest of his life, being naturalised in 1884. There he became a champion of English music and musicians, arranging for the works of such composers as Arthur Sullivan, William Sterndale Bennett and Charles Villiers Stanford to be performed for the first time at La Scala in Milan and in Rome and Naples.

Visetti became one of the leading professors of singing in the country, teaching singing at the Guildhall School of Music where his students included Bruce Carey; the London Academy of Music, at Watford School and the Royal College of Music, where his students included Clara Butt, Denise Orme, Gwynn Parry Jones, Louise Kirkby Lunn, Phyllis Lett and Agnes Nicholls. Visetti was musical adviser to the soprano Adelina Patti for five years, and wrote the popular song La Diva for her. He was Director and Conductor of the Philharmonic Society of Bath from 1878 to 1890 and for whom he wrote two cantatas, The Desert and The Praise of Song. In 1880, Umberto I, the King of Italy, conferred on him the Order of the Crown of Italy for his literary achievements. He wrote and translated several books including a life of Giovanni Palestrina and wrote a biography of Verdi for the Bells Miniature Series of Musicians (1905). In 1921, Visetti was made a Fellow of the Royal College of Music.

== Personal life ==
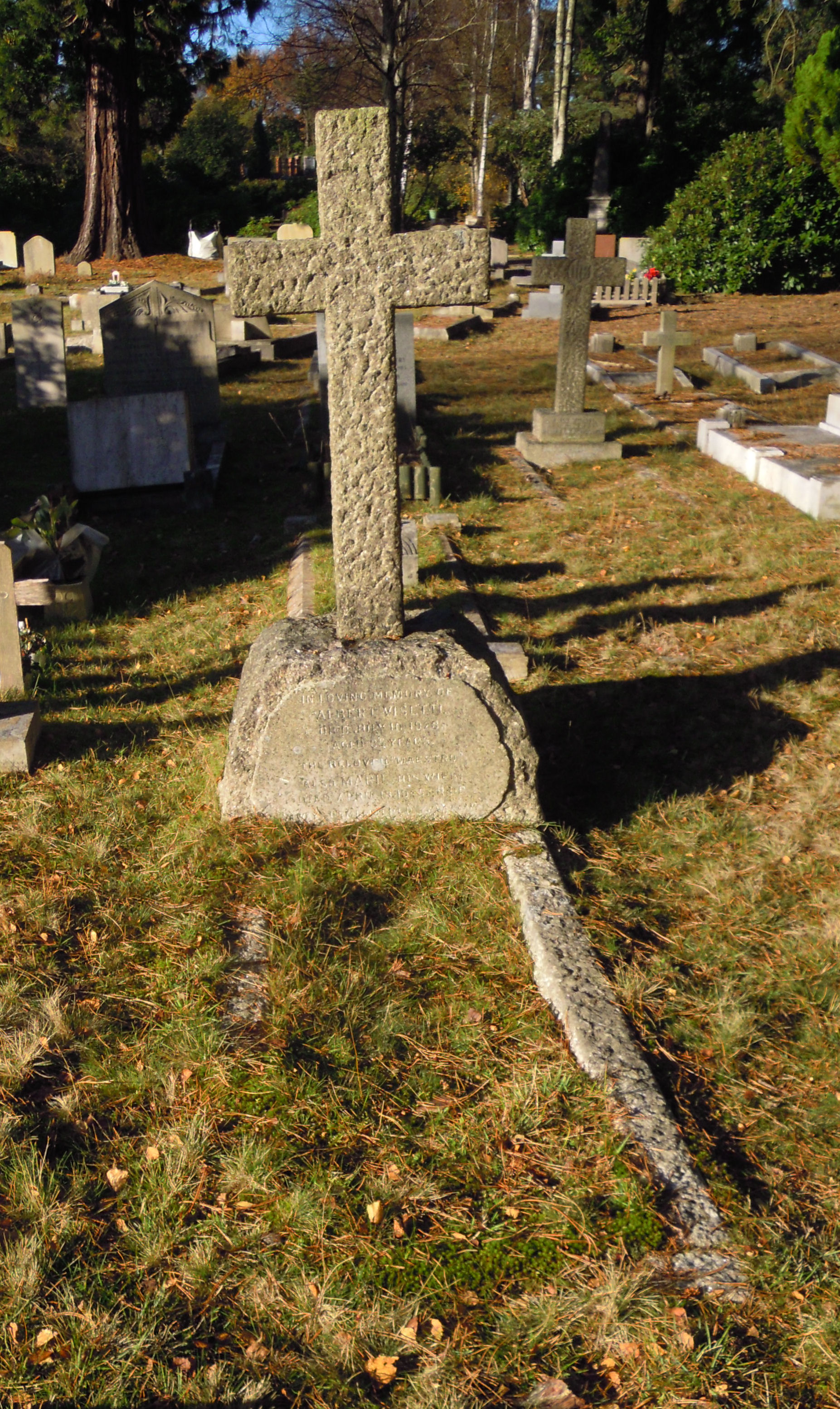
Visetti's grave in Brookwood Cemetery

By marriage he became the stepfather of the novelist Radclyffe Hall in 1889; he had a tempestuous relationship with her mother Marie (née Sager) because of his affairs with his female students and Radclyffe Hall, who hated him, claimed he made sexual advances to her when she was a teenager.

He died in London in 1928 and is buried with his wife Marie in the Catholic Section of Brookwood Cemetery.
