= Noel Edison =

Canadian conductor

- Born: November 16, 1958 (age 66); Toronto, Ontario, Canada
- Occupation: conductor
- Awards: Order of Ontario

Noel Edison OOnt (born November 16, 1958) is a Canadian conductor. He is currently the conductor of the Edison Singers.

Born in Toronto, Ontario, the son of George and Marian Clarissa (Frost), Edison graduated from Jarvis Collegiate in 1978 and Wilfrid Laurier University in 1985. He then moved to Elora, Ontario to study piano with Victor Martins. He studied conducting with Robert Shaw, Helmuth Rilling, Sir David Willcocks, Wayne Riddle and John Alldis. In 1997, he was appointed conductor of the Toronto Mendelssohn Choir.

In 2002, Edison was awarded an honorary Doctor of Music by the University of Guelph. In 2009, Edison was made a member of the Order of Ontario.

Allegations of sexual misconduct against Edison surfaced in February 2018, prompting both the Toronto Mendelssohn Choir and the Elora Singers to place him on leave pending investigation. Results of a third-party investigation ended in Edison's being relieved of his leadership duties of both The Elora Festival and The Elora Singers, in mid-April 2018. The Toronto Mendelssohn Choir and St. John's Elora also chose to let Edison go based on their own investigation during the spring of 2018.

In March 2019, Edison announced auditions for a new professional choral ensemble called The Edison Singers. For the first three seasons, he plans three concerts (nine performances) and two recordings with Naxos.
