= Francesco D'Auria =

Italian composer

Francesco Mariano D'Auria (1841-1919) was an Italian conductor, composer, and music educator. He began his career in his native country but after 1881 he was active in North America. Some of his more well known compositions include the cantatas The Sea King's Bride (1890), Crusader's Ransom (1891), and Gulnare (1892); the latter of which is considered his best and most innovative work. A number of his songs were published by Abraham Nordheimer between 1888–1893 and Whaley Royce published one of his anthems.

== Life and career ==
Born in Naples, D'Auria began his career as a conductor in his native country in the 1860s. He toured to the United States in 1881-1882 as the conductor for Adelina Patti's concert tour. He liked the country so much that he immigrated to the United States soon after, working as a conductor in New York City and Cincinnati in the mid-1880s.

In 1887, D'Auria moved to Canada to join the voice faculty of the Toronto Conservatory of Music where he taught for 8 years. Among his notable pupils there were W. H. Hewlett, Edith Jane Miller, and J. D. A. Tripp. In 1890, he formed and conducted the short lived Toronto Symphony Orchestra (no relation to the current orchestra of that name) which gave several concerts during the early 1890s but disbanded due to financial reasons. In 1895, he joined the faculty of the Winnipeg Conservatory where he remained for two years.

D'Auria returned to the United States in 1897, living and working as a music teacher and conductor in Minneapolis for several years. He returned to Canada in 1904, settling in Vancouver where he was active as a teacher and choir conductor. The Vancouver Daily World reported of his death on August 24, 1919, at St. Paul's Hospital, and the Vancouver Province ran an obituary on August 25, where it states that he left a widow and two children, soprano Margherita D'Auria-Eaton and Captain Victor D'Auria.
