= Denise Narcisse-Mair =

Canadian musician (1940–2010)

- Born: January 19, 1940; Kingston, Jamaica
- Died: June 8, 2010 (aged 70); Carlisle, Ontario, Canada
- Occupations: Composer, conductor, music educator, musicologist
- Employers: Choir-mistress, St. Mary's Cathedral (Kingston, Ontario) (1973–1975); Conductor, Hart House Chorus (1974–?); Conductor, Bach-Elgar Choir (1980–1981)

Academic background
- Education: Royal Academy of Music (LRAM 1960); Royal College of Music (ARCM 1969); King's College London (BMus 1971); Ontario Institute for Studies in Education (MEd)

Academic work
- Discipline: Musicology, music education, music performance
- Institutions: Lecturer and Senior Lecturer, Institute of Education (1970–1971); Assistant Professor, Queen's University at Kingston (1972–1976); Associate Professor, Queen's University at Kingston (1976–1980); The Royal Conservatory of Music

Denise Lorraine Narcisse-Mair (19 January 1940 – 8 June 2010) was a Canadian musicologist, music educator, choral conductor, and composer.

Narcisse-Mair was born in Kingston, Jamaica, on January 19, 1940. Her mother was a pianist and her aunt was a composer and choral conductor at a convent in Kingston, where she spent her first 13 years learning music, languages, and faith.

In 1957, Narcisse-Mair was awarded a scholarship to study piano performance at the Royal College of Music in London, England, where she also performed in the choir and played in the first violin section of the orchestra. She received her licentiate in 1960 and graduated in 1961 from the Royal Academy of Music, where she also taught during those years. She also married an English lawyer in 1961. From 1961 to 1968 she taught at secondary and grammar schools in London and Kent. She became an associate of the Royal College of Music in 1969. She served as a lecturer, senior lecturer, and postgraduate studies coordinator at the Institute of Education from 1970 to 1971, receiving a bachelor's in musicology from King's College London in 1971. She later received a master's in education from the Ontario Institute for Studies in Education.

In 1972, the Hungarian-Canadian composer István Anhalt hired Narcisse-Mair as an assistant professor and to conduct the Queen's Choral Ensemble at Queen's University at Kingston in Kingston, Ontario, Canada. She was appointed associate professor in 1976.She served as a professor there until 1980 and was affiliated with the university until 1983. From 1973 to 1975, she served as the choir-mistrees at St. Mary's Cathedral in Kingston. In 1974, she was appointed the first female conductor of the Hart House Chorus at the University of Toronto, just two years after it began accepting women singers. She served as the first and only female conductor of the Bach-Elgar Choir for its 1980–1981 season. She also taught at the Royal Conservatory of Music and McMaster University, and adjudicated Kiwanis Music Festivals.

Narcisse-Mair died on June 8, 2010, aged 70, in Carlisle, Ontario, Canada.
