= Gertrude Abbott =

Australian midwife (1846 – 1934)

- Born: Mary Jane O'Brien; 11 July 1846; Sydney, New South Wales, Australia
- Died: 12 May 1934 (aged 87); Strawberry Hills, New South Wales, Australia
- Other names: Sister Ignatius of Jesus; Mother Abbott
- Occupation: Nurse

Gertrude Abbott (also known as Mother Abbott; 11 July 1846 – 12 May 1934) was the founder of the former St Margaret's Hospital in Sydney, Australia. It was a major maternity hospital in that city for much of the 20th century.

== Early life ==
Abbott was born Mary Jane O'Brien in 1846 in Sydney, to Thomas and Rebecca (née Matthews) O'Brien. In 1848, her family moved to Dry Creek, South Australia, where her father was a schoolmaster and later became a farmer.

== Religious calling ==
When she was 22, in February 1868, O'Brien joined the Sisters of St Joseph of the Sacred Heart, which had recently been founded by Mother Mary of the Cross (Mary MacKillop, now canonized), and was given the religious name of Sister Ignatius of Jesus. She later reported to Rev Julian Tenison Woods, the co-founder of the congregation, that she had experienced visions, as did another member of community. The other Religious Sister turned out to have been lying, but she was exonerated. Due to the scandal, however, Sister Ignatius took it upon herself to leave the congregation in July 1872, just four months after having made her final profession of religious vows.

O'Brien moved back to Sydney and began to call herself Gertrude Abbott, later nicknamed Mother Abbott. She formed a small community of women in the hopes of starting a new religious congregation. They lived in scattered residences around Sydney and worked together, supporting themselves through dressmaking. Abbott nursed Woods in his final years. After his death in 1889 she inherited his estate.

== Maternity care ==
Reportedly inspired by the care that she had given a pregnant girl brought to her by the police the previous year, she opened the St. Margaret's Maternity Home in Strawberry Hills, New South Wales, in 1894. The home focused on providing safe housing and care for unmarried single pregnant women. She ran the home for forty years. The home was run by her small religious community, but was not under the authority of the Catholic Church, determined to provide nonsectarian care. The home became a hospital in 1904, offering general gynecological services and an out-patient clinic.

In 1921 the hospital moved to a new location in Surry Hills, where a significant Art Deco building had been built to house it. The community began to use the concept of art union lotteries to raise money, since they were not a recognized Catholic institution. They also began to receive government sponsorship. Sister Margaret Foley, one of the original members of the community and the principal instructor of nursing, died in 1926. At that point, Abbott retired from the administration of the hospital. She died at the hospital on 12 May 1934, aged 87.

== Legacy ==
The year of Abbott's death, the hospital registered 760 patients treated, without a single maternal death. It was the third largest obstetric hospital in Sydney. She left the hospital to the Sisters of St Joseph of the Sacred Heart. It continued to operate at the site until its services were taken over by the University of New South Wales from 1988 to 1998.
