= St Margaret's Hospital, Sydney =

Geography
- Location: Strawberry Hills (1894–1910) / Darlinghurst (1910–1998), Sydney, New South Wales, Australia

Organisation
- Type: Specialist
- Affiliated university: University of Sydney (1961–1988); UNSW (1988–1998)

Services
- Speciality: Maternity hospital

History
- Founded: 1894
- Closed: 1998

Links
- Lists: Hospitals in Australia

St Margaret's Hospital was a maternity hospital in Sydney, Australia. It opened in 1894 and closed in 1998.

== History ==
The hospital was founded by Gertrude Abbott (1836-1934), the foundress of an unofficial religious community, reportedly out of the experience of a poor, pregnant girl being brought to her in 1893 by a local policeman. The following year she opened the hospital, initially located on Elizabeth Street in Strawberry Hills, as the St Margaret's Maternity Home. It was founded "to provide shelter and care for unmarried girls of the comparatively respectable class".

From March to December 1894 Abbott admitted 9 married and 23 unmarried patients. In 1895 the hospital had 3 nurses trained as midwives, with 8 in training. In 1904, the hospital offered general gynecological services, and started an out-patients department, also with home visits by its staff. In 1910 the hospital moved to its final location at 435 Bourke Street, Darlinghurst, in a large art deco building.

Despite its religious name, Abbott established the hospital as nonsectarian, and was never under the authority of the Catholic Church. With the assistance of the members of her small community, she administered the hospital until 1924. At the time of her death at the hospital in 1934, St Margaret's was the third largest maternity hospital in Sydney. It treated 760 mothers that year, without any maternal deaths. In 1937, at her request, the hospital was taken over by the Sisters of St. Joseph of the Sacred Heart, to which Abbott had briefly belonged.

From 1961 to 1988, the hospital was a teaching hospital in obstetrics and gynecology with the University of Sydney. From 1988 until its closure in 1998 it was affiliated with the University of New South Wales.

== Current status ==
The site of St Margaret's underwent a redevelopment into high density housing in 2004. Prior to the work commencing there were local community concerns regarding the scale of the development, a lack of community and the provision of open space. The redevelopment was managed by SJB Architects. Today the St Margaret's site includes 216 apartments across four blocks placed around a public square. There are several outdoor cafes, a supermarket, general retail and an underground carpark. Object Gallery occupies the original circular chapel designed and built by Ken Woolley in 1958.

== See also ==
- List of Art Deco buildings in Sydney

== External sources ==
- History of the University of Sydney
