= Toronto Mendelssohn Choir =

Canadian large vocal ensemble

- Choir
- Origin: Toronto, Ontario, Canada
- Founded: 1894
- Genre: Classical
- Members: 160
- Chief conductor: Jean-Sébastien Vallée (www.jsvallee.com)
- Associated groups: Toronto Mendelssohn Singers
- Website: www.tmchoir.org

The Toronto Mendelssohn Choir is a Canadian large vocal ensemble based in Toronto, Ontario. It was co-founded in 1894 by Augustus S. Vogt and W. H. Hewlett to celebrate the opening of the Massey Hall. The ensemble was originally an extension of the choir of Jarvis St. Baptist Church in Toronto which Vogt directed and Hewlett accompanied. It is named after the German composer, Felix Mendelssohn.

The choir comprises 160 voices, among them a professional core of 24 singers known as the Toronto Mendelssohn Singers, who also perform independently

The choir performs secular and sacred choral masterpieces in its own annual concert series, as well as regular performances with the Toronto Symphony Orchestra. The choir has toured in the United States and Europe, performing at the Carnegie Hall, Royal Albert Hall, Notre Dame Cathedral, the Kennedy Center, and major venues in Vienna, Salzburg and Prague. In January 2010, the choir travelled to Vancouver to perform in the 2010 Cultural Olympiad.

The Toronto Mendelssohn Choir's outreach programs include Singsation Saturday Choral Workshops for singers, and an annual Choral Conductors' Symposium for emerging conductors.

== Recordings ==
Since 1926, the Toronto Mendelssohn Choir has made or been featured in 20 recordings, the most popular being Handel's Messiah with Kathleen Battle, Florence Quivar, John Aler, Samuel Ramey and the Toronto Symphony Orchestra, under the direction of Sir Andrew Davis (1987). The choir has appeared on movie soundtracks including Agnes of God and the award-winning soundtrack to Schindler's List (uncredited) under the direction of John Williams. Albums under conductor Noel Edison include Berlioz: Requiem (1998) and A Festival of Carols (2006).

In 2024, the Toronto Mendelssohn Choir, under the direction of Artistic Director Jean-Sébastien Vallée, released Remember: 130 Years of Canadian Choral Music. This landmark recording celebrates the Choir's rich history and its longstanding commitment to Canadian choral music. Featuring a selection of works by prominent Canadian composers, Remember pays tribute to the ensemble's legacy while also highlighting its forward-looking artistic vision.

== Conductors ==
- Augustus Vogt (1894–1917)
- Herbert A. Fricker (1917–1942)
- Sir Ernest MacMillan (1942–1957)
- Frederick C. Silvester (1957–1960)
- Walter Susskind (1960–1964)
- Elmer Iseler (1964–1997)
- Noel Edison (1997–2018)
- Jean-Sébastien Vallée (2021–present)
