= Augustus Stephen Vogt =

German Canadian musician

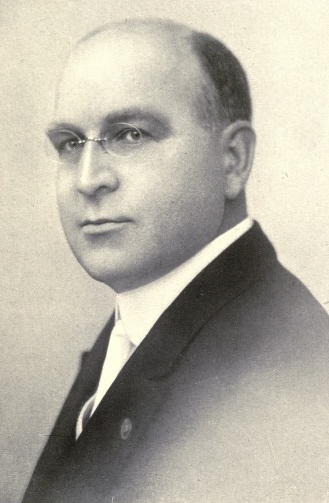
- Born: August 14, 1861; Washington, Oxford County, Canada West, Province of Canada
- Died: September 17, 1926 (aged 65); Toronto, Ontario, Canada
- Known for: Founder of the Toronto Mendelssohn Choir & musical director of the Toronto Conservatory of Music
- Spouse: Georgia Adelaide McGill (m. 1891)

Augustus Stephen Vogt (August 14, 1861 – September 17, 1926) was a German Canadian organist, choral conductor, music educator, composer, and author.

Vogt was born on 14 August 1861 in Washington, Oxford County, Canada West, Province of Canada. His father, John George Vogt, was a German Roman Catholic who emigrated to Canada to avoid the German revolutions of 1848–1849. His mother was a Swiss Lutheran woman named Marianna Zingg, who immigrated to Canada with her parents in the 1830s. Vogt grew up in Elmira, Ontario. Vogt's father was a hotel-keeper and also built organs. Vogt was appointed organist at the local church and later studied in Hamilton. He was appointed organist of First Methodist Church in St Thomas, Ontario. From 1881 to 1884, he studied at the New England Conservatory of Music. From 1885 to 1888, he studied at the Leipzig Conservatory in Germany. In 1888, he returned to Canada and was organist-choirmaster of the Jarvis Street Baptist Church in Toronto, where he would stay until 1906. He taught at the Toronto College of Music and at the Toronto Conservatory of Music. He was a fellow of the Royal College of Organists. Among his notable pupils were W. H. Hewlett and Ernest Seitz.

In 1894, he founded the Toronto Mendelssohn Choir. In 1913, he was appointed musical director of the Toronto Conservatory of Music and resigned from the Mendelssohn Choir in 1917. He began suffering from heart problems in 1918, but continued with his career, which he found demanding. He died on 17 September 1926 of a heart attack while suffering from influenza.
