= William Hayman Cummings =

English musician, tenor and organist (1831–1915)

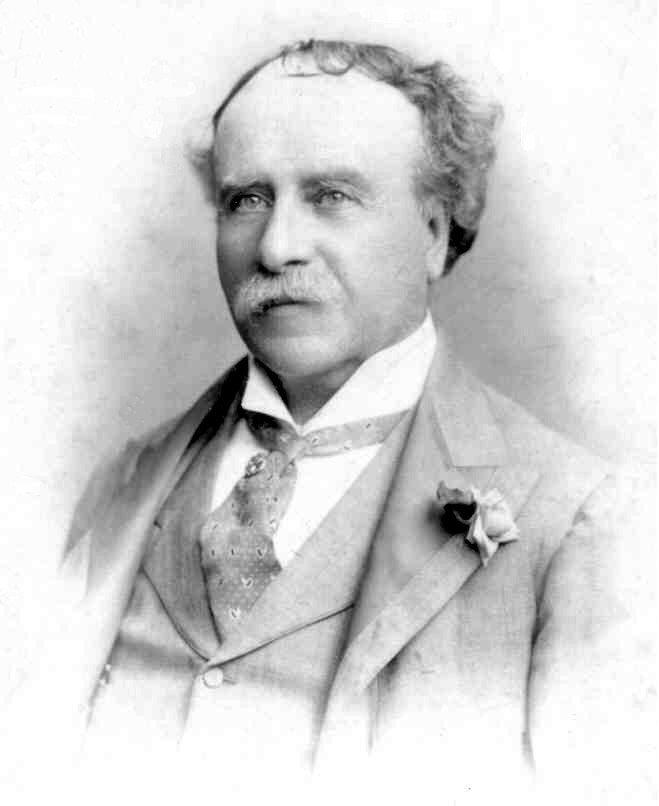

William Hayman Cummings (22 August 1831 – 5 June 1915) was an English musician, tenor and organist at Waltham Abbey Church.

Cummings was born in Sidbury (near Sidmouth) in Devon. He was educated at St Paul's Cathedral Choir School and the City of London School, becoming a pupil of Dr E. J. Hopkins, J. W. Hobbs and Alberto Randegger, and was for many years a chorister in St Paul's Cathedral and the Temple Church.

In 1847, as a teenager, he was one of the choristers when Felix Mendelssohn conducted the first London performance of his Elijah at Exeter Hall. Cummings also sang at numerous festivals and concerts throughout Great Britain and twice toured in the United States. His performance at the Triennial Festival of the Handel and Haydn Society in Boston was noticed as follows by the Chicago Tribune of 15 May 1871:

The tenor is also a new-comer, brought from England for this occasion, Mr. Wm. H. Cummings. He is a slightly-built gentleman, about five feet ten inches high, has light hair, a receding forehead, a light gentlemanly-looking (but not distingue) mustache, and stands quietly while singing. His voice is a tenor of good volume, and admirable quality—like a silver trumpet. The intonation is to be relied on, and his delivery of the tone pleasant. The words are delivered as well as possible, both in recitative and the airs. I doubt whether Mr. Cummings be a great singer, yet he is a better oratorio tenor than I have heard. He is entirely innocent of tremolo and absurd affectation.

He is credited in 1855 with linking music adapted from Mendelssohn's Festgesang to Charles Wesley's words "Hark! The Herald Angels Sing", which are now universally inextricably linked. At the Birmingham Festival he was the last-minute tenor soloist at the premiere of The Masque at Kenilworth (1866) by Arthur Sullivan, taking Giovanni Matteo Mario's place (with only half-an-hour's notice to prepare). He was also the tenor soloist there for the premiere of the sacred cantata The Woman of Samaria by William Sterndale Bennett in 1867.

Cummings founded the Purcell Society in 1876. He served as singing professor at the Royal Academy of Music for 15 years beginning in 1879. He held strong views on singing and delivered the occasional stern tirade attacking the "pernicious vibrato". As late as 1907 he gave an address on "The Culture of the Voice" in which he praised the messa di voce (which was obsolete by then) and, according to the Derby Daily Telegraph of 4 January 1907, administered:

a crushing rebuke to those who indulge in what is known as the 'tremolo'. It is, as the Doctor said, a reprehensible habit. Apart from the fact that it mars the beauty of many fine voices, it is, I agree, "a most distressing fault to the auditors, who frequently listen in doubt as to the precise pitch of the note the singer is endeavouring to produce".

He later became a professor and later the principal of the Guildhall School of Music. One of his notable pupils at the school was conductor Bruce Carey. He received an honorary doctorate in music from the University of Dublin in 1900 and was made a gentleman of the Chapel Royal. In 1902, he published a book on the origins of "God Save the King". Cummings' other appointments included:

- Professor, The Royal Normal College and Academy for the Blind
- Council Member, Incorporated Society of Musicians
- Vice-President, Royal College of Organists
- Vice-President, Royal Musical Association
- Hon. Treasurer, Royal Society of Musicians
- Hon. Treasurer, Philharmonic Society
- President, Incorporated Staff Sight Singing College

Cummings married Clara Anne Hobbs, a daughter of his teacher, the well-known singer John William Hobbs (1799–1877).

He died in London and is buried in West Norwood Cemetery, South London.
