= Edith Jane Miller =

Canadian concert singer

Edith Miller
- Born: Edith Jane Miller; February 26, 1875? Rothsay, Ontario
- Died: June 18, 1936 (aged 61); Gravesend, Kent, England
- Spouse: Max Colyer-Fergusson (m. 1913)

Edith Jane Miller (born February 26, 1875? – June 18, 1936) was a Canadian concert contralto singer. Miller's performances ranged from classical arias to French-Canadian folksongs. She also frequently appeared in oratorios and made rare appearances in operas.

== Biography ==
Edith Jane Miller was born on February 26, 1875? in Rothsay near Guelph, Ontario, Canada to Anna M. Brown and William White Miller. In 1877, she moved with her parents to Portage la Prairie, Manitoba.

Miller did vocal studies with Francesco D'Auria at the University of Toronto, taught at the Winnipeg Conservatory of Music, and later studied with Alberto Randegger in London, England and with Jean de Reszke in Paris, France. She would later make her debut at Massey Hall as a contralto.

Throughout the 1890s, Miller was active in music circles in Ontario and was a soloist in 1898 at St. Bartholomew's Episcopal Church in New York City. She was also a soloist in several early performances of Edward Elgar's The Dream of Gerontious and The Kingdom. After Miller's first concert in London in 1905, she became one of the most admired concert contralto singers in England. In 1909, she was described by the Toronto Daily Star as "one of the great concert singers of the day". Also in 1909, Miller performed a recital at the Walker Theatre (now Burton Cummings Theatre) in Winnipeg in front of 3,500 people, which became the social event of the year. In 1911, she represented Canada at the Imperial Festival Canadian concert at The Crystal Palace in London.

In July 1913, Miller married Max Colyer-Fergusson and in the same week, she appeared in a grand opera for the first time, singing as Gilda in Giuseppe Verdi's Rigoletto. She subsequently disappeared from the spotlight and retired from singing in 1917 following the birth of her first and only child.

Miller died on June 18, 1936, in Gravesend, Kent, England and was also buried in Gravesend. The Times of London said of her death: "Her success was due not only to the sweetness, purity, and power of her voice, but to her sensitive interpretation and phrasing, intelligence and good taste."
