= William White Miller =

Irish Canadian businessman (1846–1912)

- Born: August 8, 1846; Dower, County Cavan, Ireland
- Died: November 11, 1912 (aged 66); Portage la Prairie, Manitoba, Canada

William White Miller (born August 8, 1846 – November 11, 1912) was an Irish Canadian businessman.

== Biography ==
William White Miller was born on August 8, 1846, in Dower, County Cavan, Ireland to Matthew G. Miller and Jane Miller. He travelled to Canada with his parents and settled in Hamilton, Canada West in 1854. Miller was educated in public schools in Guelph, Ontario and engaged in mercantile banking in Rothsay, Ontario in 1873.

in 1877, Miller moved to Manitoba and became the manager of Patterson & MacCracken Company in Portage la Prairie, Manitoba. In 1880, he was appointed postmaster of Portage la Prairie, a position he served until his death. From 1881 to 1885, he was the secretary-treasurer of the Rural Municipality of Portage la Prairie, and from 1890 to 1910, he was the Chairman of the Portage School Board. William also served as president of the Urban Insurance Company in Portage la Prairie, served as superintendent of the Knox Presbyterian Church Sunday School in Portage la Prairie for 30 years, and served as president of the Local Bible Society for over 20 years.

On November 11, 1912, he died in Portage la Prairie, Manitoba, Canada.

== Personal life ==
In 1872, Miller married Anna M. Brown from Listowel, Ontario, with whom he had one daughter, Edith Jane Miller, who would become a concert contralto singer.
