= Royal Hamilton College of Music =

Coordinates: 43.25300°N 79.87103°W

The Royal Hamilton College of Music was a Canadian music conservatory in Hamilton, Ontario that was actively providing higher education in music during the late 19th century and 20th century. The college was founded as the Hamilton Conservatory of Music in 1897 by C. L. M. Harris, who served as the school's first director through 1907. From 1904 until its closing in 1980 due to financial reasons the school was located at premises on James St South. In 1906 the school became affiliated with the University of Toronto through which the school awarded Bachelor of Music degrees through 1918. The school also offered its own associate, licentiate, and fellow diplomas and offered bachelor's degrees through the University of Trinity College, thereby offering three different examination systems during its history. In 1907 J. E. P. Aldous, Bruce Carey, and W. H. Hewlett became co-directors of the college. Hewlett became sole director in 1918, a position he held until 1939. Other directors of the college included Cyril Hampshire (1939–44), Reginald Bedford (1944-8), Reginald Godden (1948–53), Lorne Betts (1953–59), Harold Jerome (1959–67), Gladys Whitehead (1967–74), and Jonathan Watts (1974–80).

In its heyday, the Conservatory had a faculty of 60 and a student enrolment of more than 1,000. In the late 1970s the Hamilton Conservatory of Music experienced severe financial problems. Despite the concerted efforts of the community the HCM closed in 1980. The building was converted to other uses and then abandoned; losing its connection as a cultural centre.

In 1997, the building was purchased by Vitek Wincza and reopened as the Hamilton Conservatory for the Arts. Since its reopening, the Hamilton Conservatory for the Arts has become an all-arts educational facility that offers over 100 arts programs for people of all ages, including dance, theatre, visual arts, and music.

In addition to the school, HCA’s charitable arms, Arts For All and HCA Society, serve the community with accessible arts education and high-quality artistic programming. HCA is also home to a variety of professional arts activities including the Performing Arts Sunday Series, HCA Gallery, Dances at the Bay, and more.

== See also ==
- Category:Academic staff of the Royal Hamilton College of Music
