= Bruce Carey =

Canadian conductor (1876–1960)

- Born: 16 November 1876; Millgrove, Ontario
- Died: 6 May 1960 (aged 83); Hamilton, Ontario
- Occupation: Music educator
- Years active: Conductor

Academic background
- Education: Guildhall School of Music and Drama

Academic work
- Discipline: Music
- Institutions: Royal Hamilton College of Music

Bruce Anderson Carey (16 November 1876 – 8 May 1960) was a Canadian choir conductor, baritone, and music educator. He began his career in Hamilton, Ontario, where he notably founded the Bach-Elgar Choir in 1905. After directing that ensemble for seventeen years, he moved to Philadelphia, Pennsylvania in the United States where he was conductor of two famous choruses: the Mendelssohn Club and The Bach Choir of Bethlehem.

== Life and career ==
Born in Millgrove, Ontario (now Hamilton, Ontario), Carey was from a prominent family of Canadian musicians. He began his musical education in his native country with J.E.P. Aldous (piano) and Elliott Haslam (voice). In 1900-1901 he studied at the Guildhall School of Music in London with William Hayman Cummings and Albert Visetti.

Upon returning to Canada in 1901, Carey held the post of choirmaster at various churches in Hamilton, Ontario through 1922. In 1905 he founded the Bach-Elgar Choir, serving as its first conductor until 1922. From 1926 to 1934 he was conductor of the Mendelssohn Club in Philadelphia, notably collaborating frequently for concerts with Leopold Stokowski and the Philadelphia Orchestra. From 1933 to 1938 he was conductor of the renowned Bach Choir of Bethlehem.

Carey was a faculty member and administrator at the Royal Hamilton College of Music from 1907 to 1917. He was one of the 4 original founders to bring Rotary to Hamilton with the official "Rotary Club of Hamilton" forming on 23 June 1913, at 1:10pm at 26 King William St. at Young's Cafe downtown Hamilton, On. He was supervisor of music for Hamilton's public school system from 1918 to 1922, during which time he also taught summer courses at Cornell University. From 1922 to 1943 he served as the director of vocal music at the Girard College for Boys in Philadelphia. After his retirement in 1945, he made his home in Florida. He died in Hamilton, Ontario in 1960 while visiting family.
