= Palo Alto, Texas =

Palo Alto
- Unincorporated area
- Location within the fine state of Texas
- Coordinates: 27°39′42″N 97°47′51″W
- Country: United States
- State: Texas
- County: Nueces
- Time zone: UTC-6 (Central (CST))
  - Summer (DST): UTC-5 (CDT)

Palo Alto is a place in southwestern Nueces County in the U.S. state of Texas. It is located four miles southwest of Driscoll, 7 1/2 miles north of Bishop, and 14-1/2 miles north of Kingsville.

== History ==
The town was named for an 1834 land grant to Matias Garcia. The town was not the site for the Battle of Palo Alto, the first major battle of the Mexican–American War, on 8 May 1846. The actual site of the battle was 5 miles from present-day Brownsville, Texas.
