= Ernest Seitz =

Canadian composer, songwriter, pianist and music educator

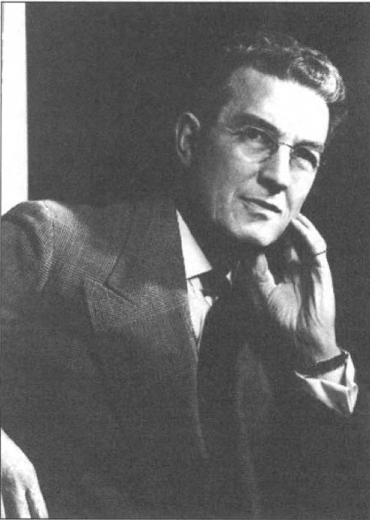
Ernest Seitz (1909)

Ernest Joseph Seitz (29 February 1892 – 10 September 1978) was a Canadian composer, songwriter, pianist, and music educator. He published some of his work under the pseudonym "Raymond Roberts" because he did not wish to be associated with popular music. His most famous work is The World Is Waiting for the Sunrise, which he co-wrote with Gene Lockhart. Some of his other notable songs include Laddie Boy (1932), When Moonbeams Softly Fall (1935), and The Sky's the Limit (1943). He retired from performance in 1945 and from teaching in 1946. For the rest of his life he served as president of his family's business, an automobile dealership in Toronto. He was made a Fellow of the Royal Society of Arts in London in 1954, and on 18 July 1984, Toronto acquired a piece of parkland which was dedicated by Ms. Seitz, naming it Sunrise after Ernest's most famous work.

== Life ==
Born in Hamilton, Ontario, Seitz received his first musical training from A. S. Vogt in Toronto from 1903 to 1910. He went to Germany in 1910 where he was a pupil of Josef Lhévinne in Berlin for four years. He had initially intended to pursue a career as a concert pianist in Europe, but the outbreak of World War I made this impossible. He was later a pupil of Ernest Hutcheson in New York City.

Seitz returned to Toronto in 1914 where he soon acquired a position on the music faculty of the Toronto Conservatory of Music. He continued to teach there through 1946. Among his notable pupils were Naomi Adaskin, André Asselin, Ewart Bartley, Muriel Gidley, Reginald Godden, Scott Malcolm, Adelmo Melecci, Earle Moss, Harold Packer, Charles Peaker, and Lorne Watson.

Seitz was active as a concert pianist from 1914 through 1945, being most active during the 1920s and 1930s. He made a total of 18 appearances with the Toronto Symphony Orchestra at Massey Hall during his career, performing major works by such composers as Bortkiewicz, Chopin, Anton Rubinstein, and Tchaikovsky.

With that orchestra he notably performed the North American premiere of Constant Lambert's The Rio Grande on 11 February 1930.

He performed in recitals and concerts throughout North America and was frequently heard on Canadian radio. In the United States he made solo appearances with the New York Philharmonic, the Boston Symphony Orchestra, and the Philadelphia Orchestra among others. He also worked frequently as an accompanist, playing in concerts for such artists as Arthur Blight, Ferdinand Fillion, and Luigi von Kunits.
