= Central Presbyterian Church (Hamilton, Ontario) =

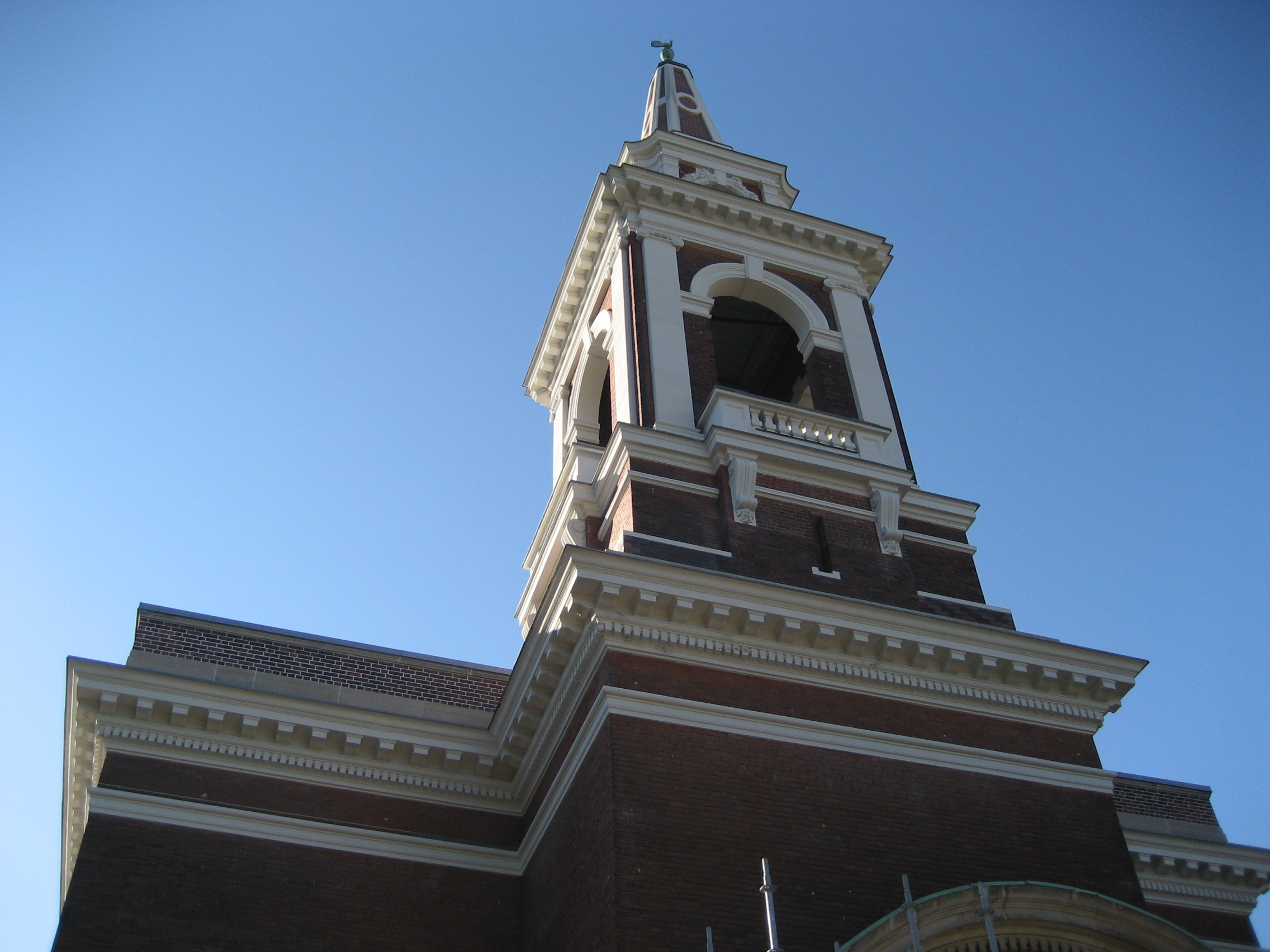
- Church spire

- Location of Central Presbyterian Church in Ontario
- 43°15′04″N 79°52′45″W
- Location: 165 Charlton Avenue West; Hamilton, Ontario L8P 2C8
- Country: Canada
- Denomination: Presbyterian Church in Canada

History
- Founded: 1841

Central Presbyterian Church is a Presbyterian Church in Canada congregation in Hamilton, Ontario, Canada, located in the downtown area at the corner of Charlton (165 Charlton Avenue West) and Caroline Street South.

== History ==
The congregation was formed in 1841, as a part of the United Presbyterian Church of Scotland's Canadian Synod, and had been served monthly since 1837 from nearby West Flamboro by the UPC's pioneer missionary to the region, Thomas Christie.

The congregation first met in a former schoolhouse in downtown Hamilton, with close proximity to two larger Presbyterian congregations, St Andrew's (now St. Paul's), the large Church of Scotland congregation, and MacNab Street Presbyterian Church (Hamilton), the second "Free Church". It was rebuilt in 1858, and became known as Central Presbyterian Church after the 1875 merger and affiliation within the Presbyterian Church in Canada; the successful union proposals were inaugurated by their former pastor William Ormiston, prior to his move to New York City in 1870.

On June 21, 1906, the 1858 building was destroyed in a massive fire, and plans were commenced to rebuild in a new location; the minister's son, John M. Lyle, was architect of the new building, which was opened on June 14, 1908, complemented with a large Casavant Frères pipe organ. Lyle was responsible for Toronto's Royal Alexandra Theatre, the Runnymede branch of the Toronto Public Library and Union Station (Toronto), amongst many other well-known buildings in the region. Central is the only church structure that Lyle designed. Lyle's design for the building was influenced by the Church of St. Martin-in-the-Fields in London and the Congregational Church of Naugatuck, Connecticut, and is unusual in having a flat roof, thereby resembling more the public buildings favoured by the École des Beaux-Arts than the traditional European church. Nevertheless, the church's interior is dominated by a series of traditional stained-glass windows portraying episodes from the Bible. Central's spire, which is illuminated at night, is a distinctive landmark visible throughout the surrounding neighbourhoods, as well as from the top of the nearby Niagara Escarpment.

In 1925, the congregation voted narrowly (398-381) to remain within the Presbyterian Church in Canada. The Minister, Rev. William Sedgewick, and many members left for the United Church of Canada.

Two members of Central Church were appointed to represent the King as Lieutenant Governor of Ontario. These were Sir John Morison Gibson, who served from 1908 to 1914, and Sir John Strathearn Hendrie, who served between 1914 and 1919. Memorial plaques for the two are located on the inside walls of the sanctuary. Even today members of Central Church play prominent roles in the public life and culture of Hamilton, including city government, the arts and higher education, as well as within the Presbyterian Church in Canada.

The congregation remains active in downtown Hamilton, until recently known for its music programme, and its connection with The Argyll and Sutherland Highlanders, as well as its reputation for lengthy pastorates. The current minister is the Rev. Dr. Gregory Davidson, who was inducted in August 2015.

== Image gallery ==
Images of Central Presbyterian Church
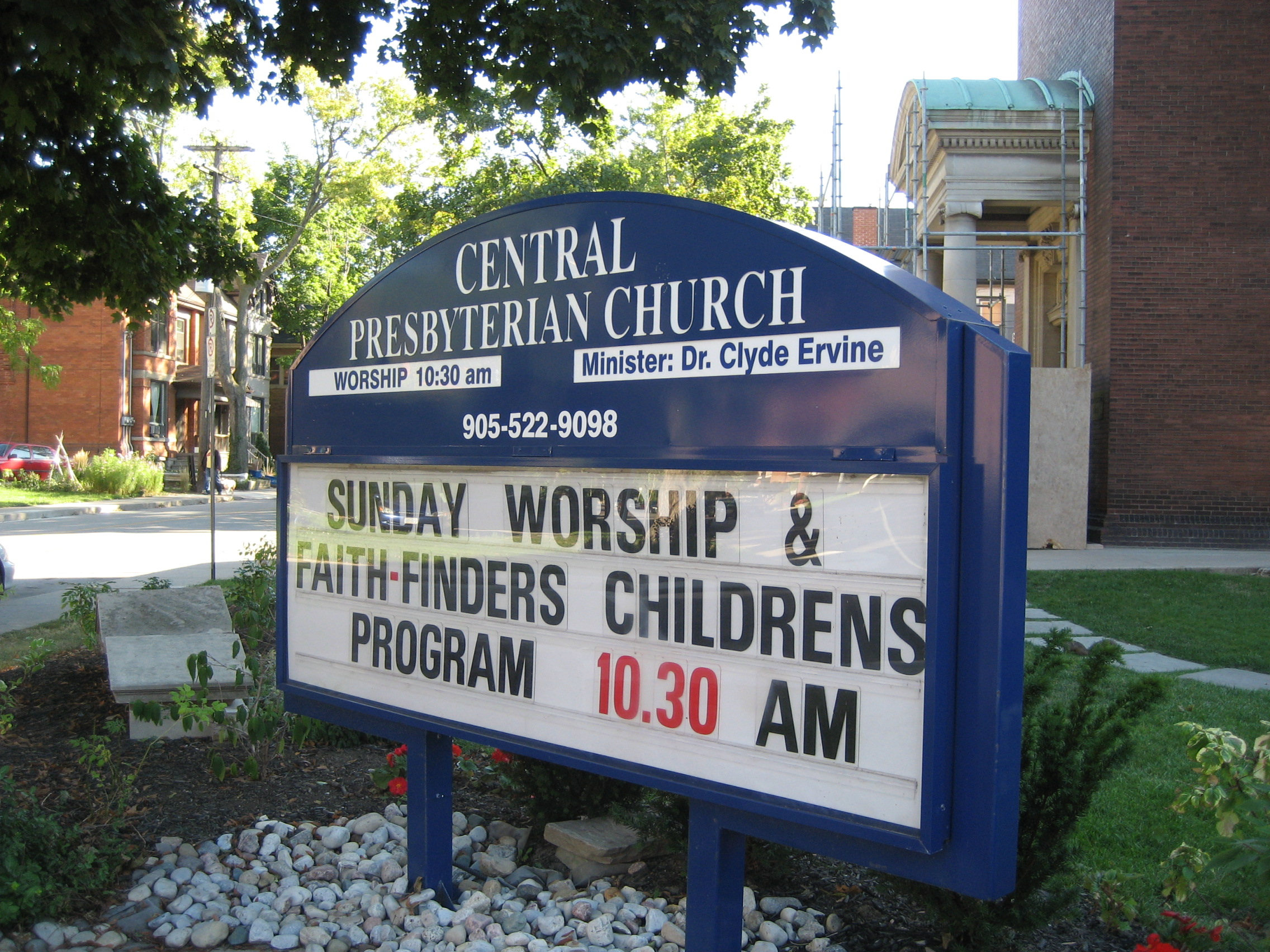
Display sign in front of the church.

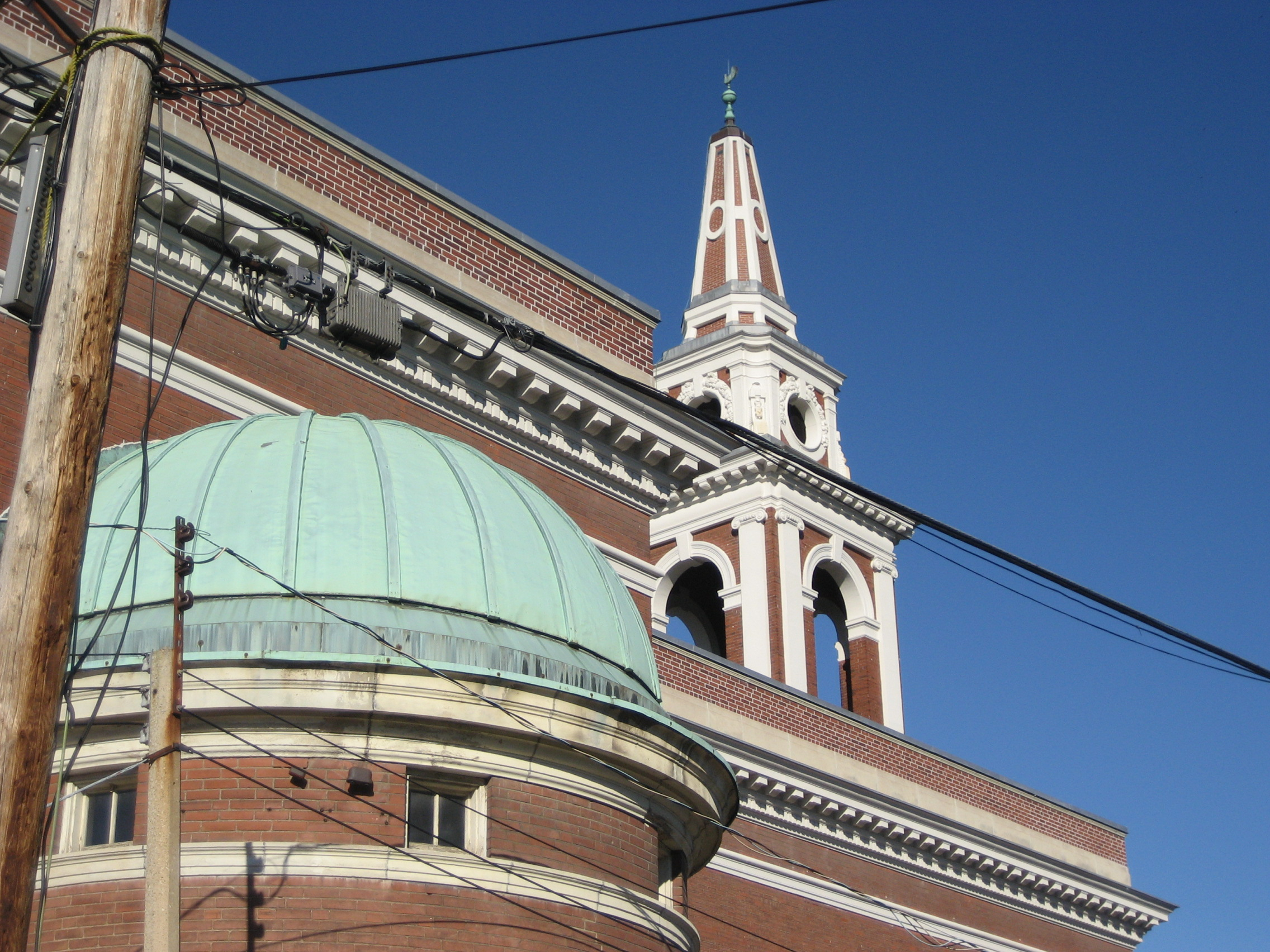
South side of the church showing spire.

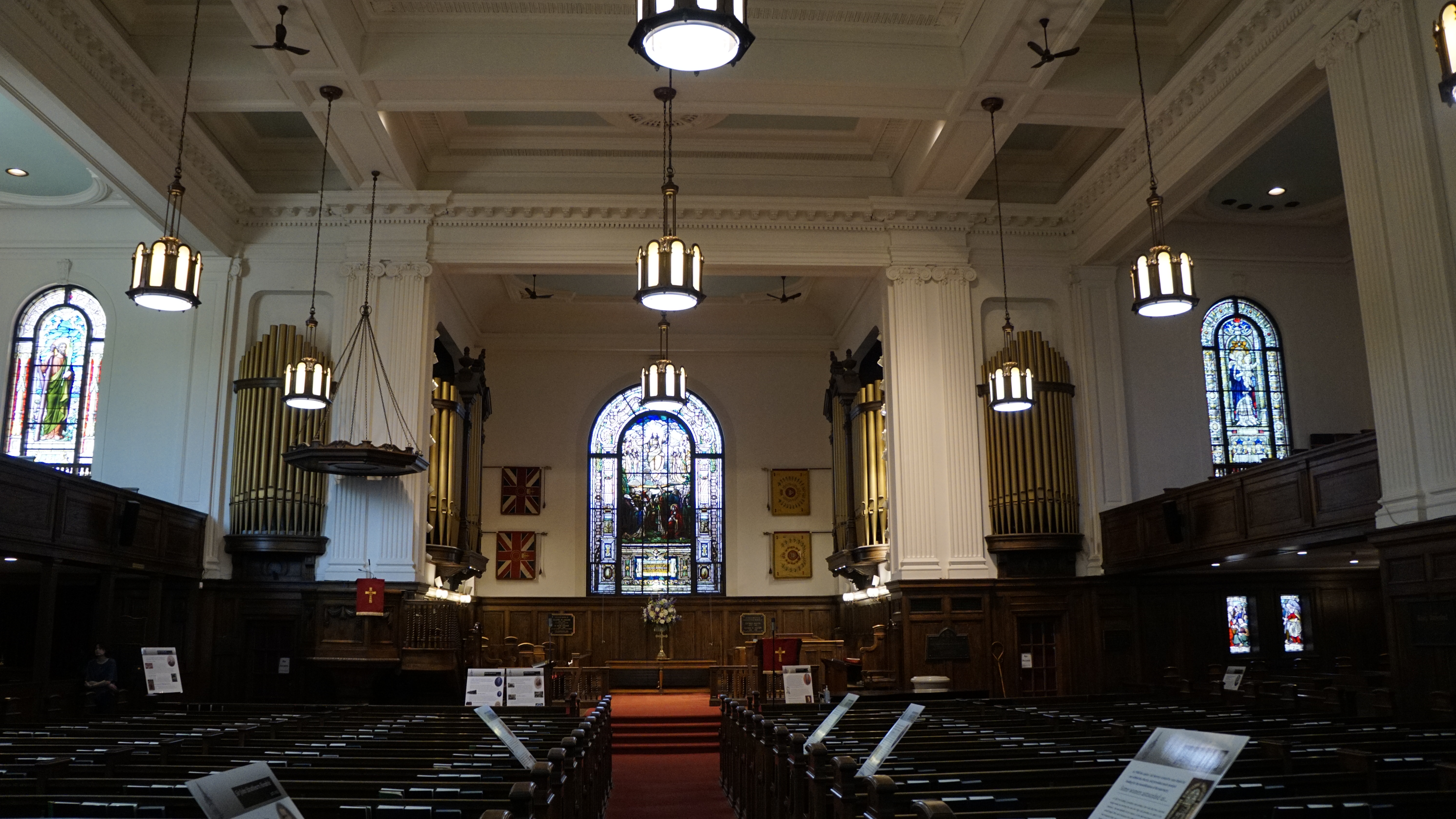
Interior
