= Charles Peaker =

Canadian organist, choirmaster and academic (1899–1978)

Charles Peaker OC (6 December 1899 – 11 August 1978) was a Canadian organist, choirmaster and academic.

== Life ==
Peaker was born on 6 December 1899, in Derby; aged 13 he moved to Saskatoon, Canada. From age 19, he studied in Toronto under Ernest Seitz, Healey Willan and Ernest MacMillan.

From 1926 to 1944, he was organist and choirmaster successively of churches in St Catharines, Rosedale and Deer Park in Ontario (lastly at Deer Park United Church). From 1944 to 1975, he was organist of St. Paul's, Bloor Street in Toronto.

He gave concerts as organist, and performed outside Canada, including a tour of the US in 1935 and England in 1954.

From 1930 to 1970, Peaker was an academic at the Toronto Conservatory of Music; from 1944 to 1945 he was its director. Pupils included Godfrey Ridout and Charles Wilson. From 1952 to 1965, he gave lectures at the University of Toronto. He was president of the Royal Canadian College of Organists from 1941 to 1943. He was made a member of the Order of Canada in 1974.

He was said to have a flamboyant technique, ingenuity in registration, and the ability to play whole works from memory.

The archives of Charles Peaker are held in the National Library of Canada.
