= Strawberry Hills =

Coordinates: 33°53′20″S 151°12′36″E

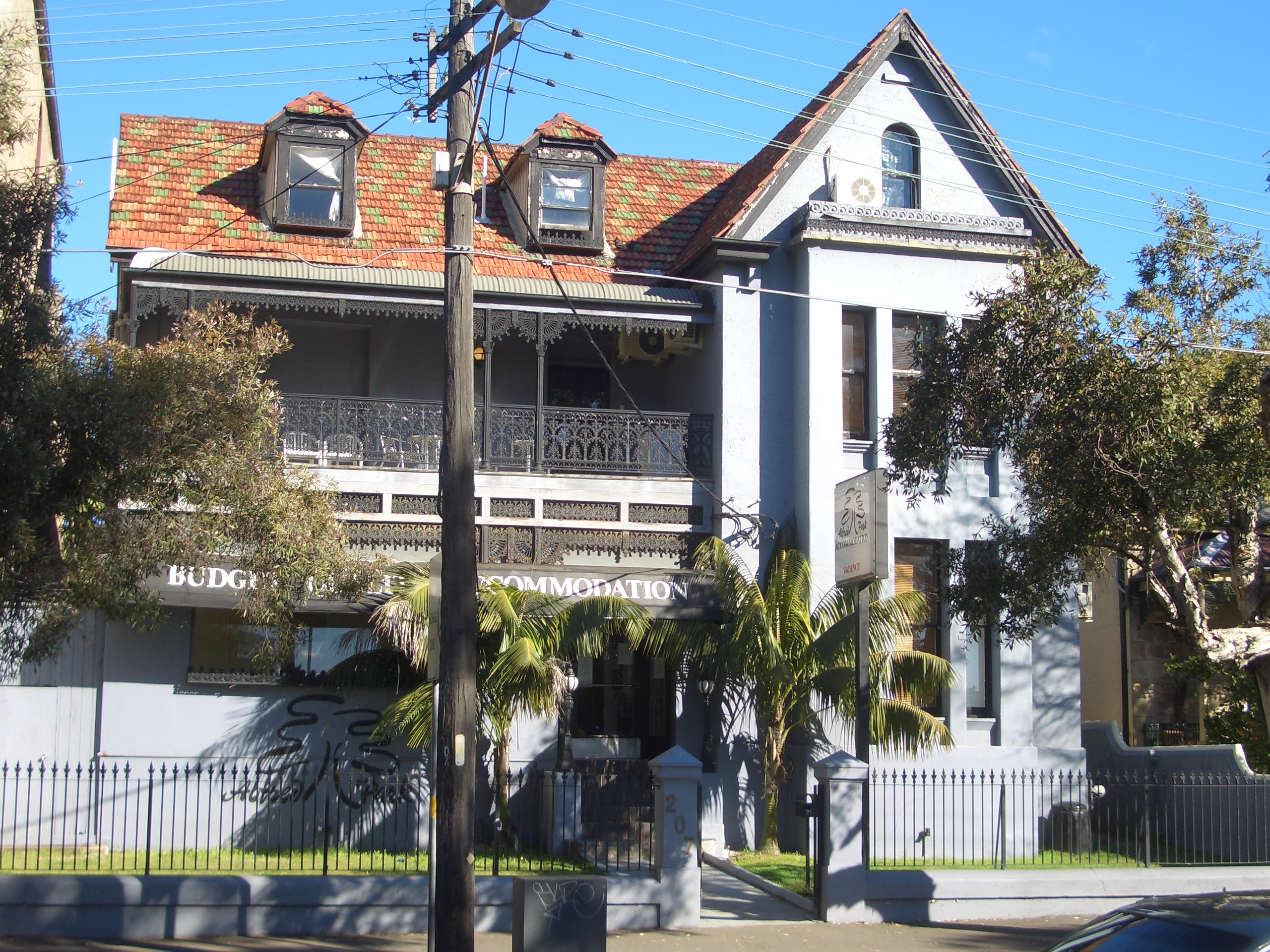
- Alfred Park Hotel, Cleveland Street
- Country: Australia
- State: New South Wales
- City: Sydney
- LGA: City of Sydney
- Location: 2 km (1.2 mi) south-east of Sydney CBD
- Postcode: 2012
Localities around Strawberry Hills
| Sydney CBD | Surry Hills | Surry Hills |
| Chippendale | Strawberry Hills | Surry Hills |
| Redfern | Redfern | Redfern |

Strawberry Hills is an official urban place in Sydney, New South Wales, Australia. Strawberry Hills is located east of Central railway station, within the suburbs of Surry Hills and Redfern which are part of the local government area of the City of Sydney. The origin of the name is unknown.

The neighbourhood features mostly mixed commercial/residential & business developments with medium to high density residential developments, including terrace housing and newer apartment blocks.

Strawberry Hills is also the home of a number of significant cultural organisations including Opera Australia, Creative Australia, and numerous notable entertainment venues including the Belvoir Street Theatre and the Strawberry Hills Hotel, a renowned traditional Australian jazz venue located on Elizabeth Street.

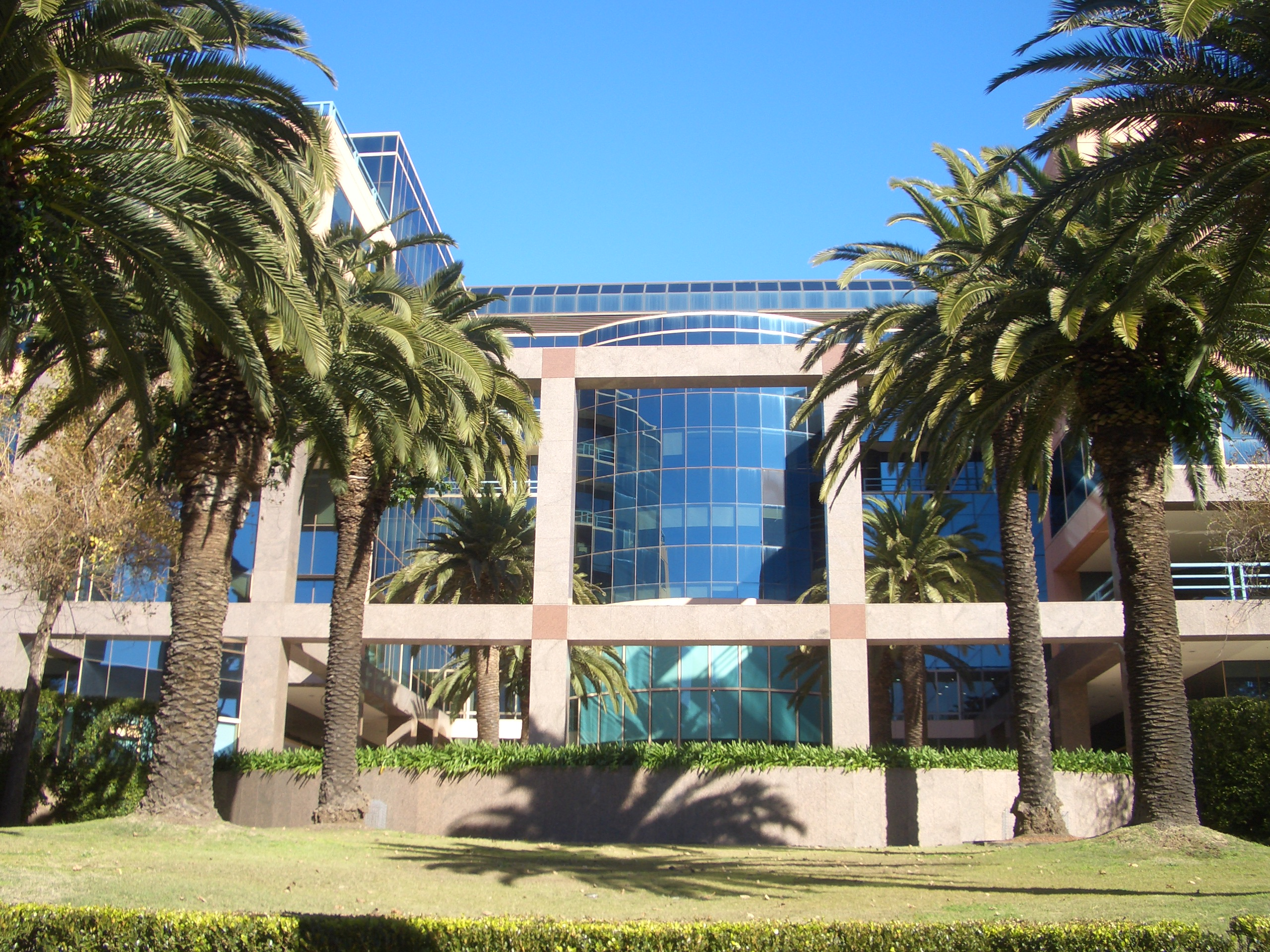
Australia Post NSW headquarters

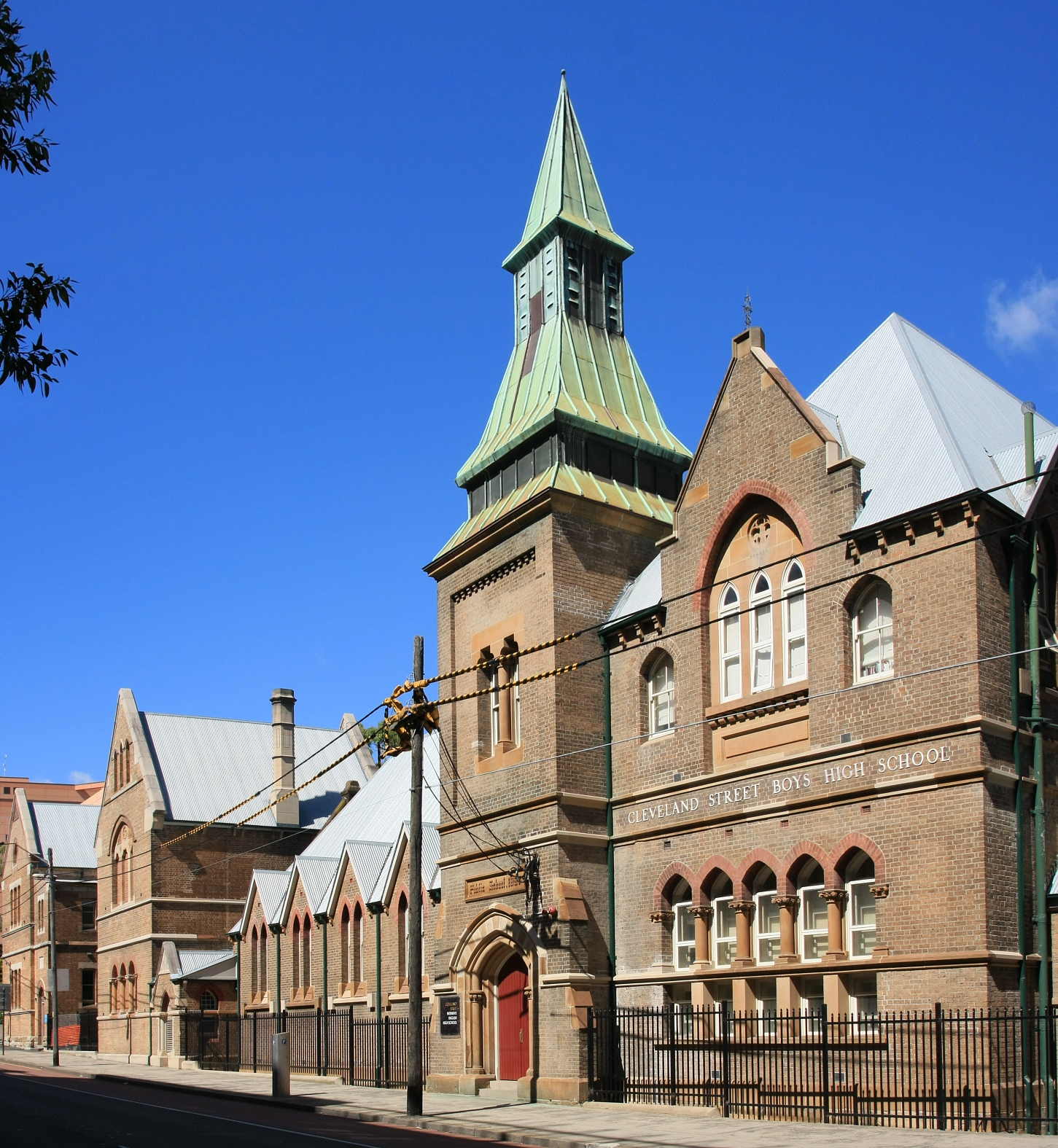
Inner Sydney High School

== History ==
The area originally known as Strawberry Hill, was named after the hill centred under 'Northcott Place' at Surry Hills.

Strawberry Hill was part of a 70-acre land grant to John Palmer in 1794. Facing substantial debts, his holdings were subdivided into large blocks for the Provost Marshal's Sale of 1814. John Connell farmed the largest of these blocks south of Devonshire Street. He sold the property to Thomas Horton James, who subdivided the block as the Strawberry Hill Estate in 1832. Strawberry Hill was a huge mound of sand, made mobile in the 1820s by the destruction of undergrowth by woodcutters, turfcutters, graziers and quarriers. During the 1830s the sand began to advance on the new Strawberry Hill Estate.

Unregulated and unrestrained low-cost housing developed in the area. By the 1870s the area was well known for its poor sanitary conditions. After the construction of the Central railway station and associated resumptions and demolition, industry became established in Surry Hills, with warehouses springing up in streets like Marshall Street. Inner-city housing stock became depleted.

A cycling velodrome and associated sporting facility was built on Strawberry Hill in the early 20th century. After World War II, regeneration of Surry Hills as a residential area began with an influx of migrants and change of policy. The New South Wales Housing Commission demolished the original housing stock and built three storey medium-density housing on Devonshire and Clisdell Streets. By 1961 the fifteen-storey tower "Northcott Place" was completed on Strawberry Hill.
