= List of horn players =

This list of horn players and pedagogues includes notable players of French horn, German horn, natural horn, Vienna horn, tenor (alto) horn, and alphorn.

== B ==
- Radek Baborák, born 1976, former Principal horn Berlin Philharmonic Orchestra, Munich Phil. Orch, Czech Phil. Orch. winner of the ARD, Geneva, Markneukirchen, Concertino Praga Hochschule für Musik Saar.
- Andrew Bain, principal horn of the Los Angeles Philharmonic, LA studio player, horn professor at the Colburn School in Los Angeles, California
- Georges Barboteu (1924–2006), Former professor at CNSM, member of the French French-horn school, horn instructor of many current French French hornists
- Hermann Baumann (1934–2023), former principal horn Philharmonisches Orchester Dortmund and Stuttgart Radio Symphony Orchestra, winner of the ARD International Music Competition in 1964, soloist, performing on natural horn and valved horn
- Richard Bissill, player, composer, arranger and professor
- Aubrey Brain, player (1893–1955)
- Dennis Brain, player (1921–1957)
- Arthur C. Brooks, social scientist whose previous profession was horn player
- Timothy Brown, principal horn in BBC Symphony Orchestra and Academy of St Martin in the Fields, Melos Ensemble

== C ==
- John Cerminaro, principal New York Philharmonic (1969–79), principal Seattle Symphony 1996–2011
- Alan Civil, second horn Royal Philharmonic Orchestra (to Dennis Brain), later principal. In 1955, joined the Philharmonia, and in 1957 became principal horn, after the death of Dennis Brain, principal of BBC Symphony Orchestra from 1966 to 1988
- Dale Clevenger, principal horn of the Chicago Symphony Orchestra from 1966 to 2013
- Thomas Coates, hornist with Pomp's Cornet Band, Easton, Pennsylvania (1840s to 1850s) and conductor, regimental band, 47th Pennsylvania Infantry Regiment (1861–82)
- Geoff Collinson, principal horn, Australian Opera and Ballet Orchestra

== D ==
- Stefan Dohr, Solo Horn, Berlin Philharmonic
- Peter Damm, principal horn Dresden Staatskapelle 1969–2002. He is professor of horn at the Carl Maria von Weber music conservatoire.
- Vincent DeRosa, LA studio player
- Richard Dunbar, was a player of the French horn, playing in the free jazz scene. He was born in Brooklyn, New York, on May 29, 1944, and he died suddenly at the age of 61, apparently of a heart attack, on the way to a gig on February 8, 2006.
- Simon de Souza, professor of horn at the Birmingham Conservatoire
- Vladimir Djambazov, second horn of the Sofia Philharmonic and composer

== E ==
- Pip Eastop, Fellow of the Royal Academy of Music and former principal horn of the London Sinfonietta
- John Entwistle, bass player from the Who, also played horn

== F ==
- Philip Farkas, principal Chicago Symphony Orchestra 1936–41 and 1947–60, Cleveland Orchestra 1941–45 and 1946–47, Boston Symphony 1945–46, also horn professor at Indiana University from 1960 to 1992

== G ==
- Jacques-François Gallay (1795–1864), academic at the Paris Conservatoire
- Livia Ruth Gollancz (1920–2018), principal horn of the Hallé, BBC Scottish Orchestra and other UK ensembles during the 1940s-50s
- David Guerrier, French trumpeter and hornist, former professor at CNSM of Lyon

== H ==
- Anthony Halstead (horn, natural horn, piano, organ and conductor), exponent of period-instrument performance notably with the Hanover Band
- Anton Joseph Hampel, horn player of the 18th century who developed the technique of hand-stopping
- Max Hess, Boston Symphony Orchestra 1905–25, Cincinnati Symphony Orchestra 1925–37
- Douglas Hill
- Heinrich Hübler

== J ==
- Ifor James
- Johann Nepomuk Janatka (1800–1878), academic at Prague Conservatory
- Stefan de Leval Jezierski, Berlin Philharmonic
- Lin Jiang, Barry Tuckwell Brass Prize winner, principal horn of the Hong Kong Philharmonic Orchestra and Australian World Orchestra.

== K ==
- Daniel Katzen, former member of Boston Symphony Orchestra, Associate Professor of Horn at the "University of Arizona School of Music" in Tucson
- Felix Klieser, German professional hornist born without arms, operates valves with toes on his left foot
- Georg Kopprasch, composer of the Kopprasch Etudes
- Helen Kotas Hirsch, principal horn, Chicago Symphony Orchestra (1941–1948), first female brass musician hired by Chicago Symphony Orchestra
- Peter Kurau, principal Rochester Philharmonic and Professor of Horn at the Eastman School of Music

== L ==
- Ludwig Wenzel Lachnith, Bohemian horn player and composer of horn concertos.
- Julie Landsman, former Principal Horn, Metropolitan Opera Orchestra (1985–2010), Juilliard faculty since 1989.
- Wilhelm Lanzky-Otto
- Joseph Leutgeb
- Eduard Constantin Lewy (1796–1846), played in the premiere of Beethoven's Symphony No. 9, teacher at the Vienna Conservatory.
- Josef Rudolf Lewy (1802–1881), brother of Eduard Constantin Lewy, composer of music for the horn.
- Boštjan Lipovšek
- Frank Lloyd

== M ==
- Joseph Masella, principal horn of both the Montreal Symphony Orchestra and the CBC Montreal Orchestra from 1943 to 1969.
- Susan McCullough, professor at Lamont School of Music.
- Brown Meggs, writer, Capitol Records executive. Wrote a solo horn variation on the Beatles melody "I Want to Hold Your Hand".
- Christian Mengis, hornist and composer at the court of Frederick the Great from 1745.
- Ethel Merker, prominent horn player in Chicago beginning in the 1940s, design collaborator on the Holton Merker-Matic line of horns
- Philip Myers, principal, New York Philharmonic Orchestra 1980–2017)
- Ricardo Matosinhos

== N ==
- Marie-Luise Neunecker, former professor at Hochschule für Musik Hanns Eisler Berlin and Hochschule für Musik und Darstellende Kunst Frankfurt am Main, former principal horn at the Bamberg Symphony Orchestra and the Frankfurt Radio Symphony.
- Jeff Nelsen, horn player for Canadian Brass, on faculty at Indiana University
- Hermann Neuling

== O ==
- Martin Owen, principal BBC Symphony Orchestra, Professor of Horn at the Royal Academy of Music and Trinity College of Music

== P ==
- Vicente Zarzo Pitarch, for 25 years the horn soloist in the Residentie Orkest in the Hague
- Abel Pereira
- Beate Pokorny
- Valery Polekh
- Giovanni Punto
- William Purvis

== R ==
- Eugene Rittich

== S ==
- Neill Sanders, Melos Ensemble, London Orchestras
- Will Sanders, Bavarian Radio Symphony Orchestra
- Lorenzo Sansone, member of major North American symphony orchestras, music editor, educator, and horn manufacturer.
- Gunther Schuller, Cincinnati Symphony Orchestra, Metropolitan Opera Orchestra, and composer
- Jeremy Smith Horn Player for Hunters & Collectors
- James Sommerville, Boston Symphony Orchestra
- Scott Spillane, member of Neutral Milk Hotel
- Stephen Stirling, principal horn City of London Sinfonia, co-principal horn Academy of St Martin in the Fields, teaches at Trinity College of Music, soloist, chamber musician
- Franz Strauss

== T ==
- Esa Tapani, former principal horn Finnish Radio Symphony Orchestra, Professor at Frankfurt University of Music and Performing Arts
- James Thatcher, LA studio player
- Lucien Thévet, (1914-2007) principal horn of the Paris Conservatoire Orchestra from 1938 to 1967, the Orchestre de l'Opéra national de Paris from 1941 to 1974, professor of horn at the Versailles Conservatoire from 1948 to 1981, and Honorary Member of the International Horn Society from 1978
- Michael Thompson, former principal with Philharmonia Orchestra, teacher at Royal Academy of Music, soloist/chamber musician/clinician
- Barry Tuckwell, former principal horn London Symphony Orchestra, soloist and clinician
- Bedřich Tylšar, former horn player with the Czech Philharmonic Orchestra, soloist and pedagogue
- Zdeněk Tylšar, former principal horn with the Czech Philharmonic Orchestra, soloist and pedagogue

== V ==
- Eugène Léon Vivier, French player (1821–1900)
- Radovan Vlatkovic, former principal of Berlin Radio Symphony Orchestra from 1982 to 1990, professor of horn at Mozarteum in Salzburg, soloist
- Ondřej Vrabec, current solo horn of Czech Philharmonic Orchestra

== W ==
- Julius Watkins, a jazz horn player
- Richard Watkins, principal horn of Philharmonia Orchestra from 1985 to 1996, professor at Royal Academy of Music, soloist, chamber musician
- Joan Thelma Watson, principal horn of the Canadian Opera Orchestra and a founding member of the True North Brass quintet
- Sebastian Weigle, former principal horn of the Berlin State Opera and an active conductor
- Froydis Ree Wekre, member of Oslo Philharmonic from 1961 to 1991, co-principal from 1965 on, Professor of Horn at Norwegian Academy of Music, soloist
- Kate Westbrook, tenor horn player
- Jonathan Williams, British orchestral and solo horn player
- Sarah Willis, low horn of the Berlin Philharmonic
- Katy Woolley, co-principal horn of the Royal Concertgebouw Orchestra

== Z ==
- John Zirbel, principal horn of the Montreal Symphony Orchestra (1979 to 2019), soloist and teacher

== Use of the horn in jazz ==
The horn is used only rarely in jazz, but there have been a few notable players:

- Pietro Amato, member of The Luyas, Arcade Fire, Bell Orchestre and Torngat
- David Amram
- John Clark
- Vincent Chancey
- Sharon Freeman
- John Graas
- Stefan de Leval Jezierski
- Dave Lee
- Bob Northern
- Willie Ruff
- Gunther Schuller
- Arkady Shilkloper
- Richard Todd
- Tom Varner
- Julius Watkins

== See also ==
- Lists of musicians
