= Tylšar =

Tylšar is a surname. Notable people with the surname include:

- Bedřich Tylšar (1939–2026), Czech horn player and music pedagogue
- Zdeněk Tylšar (1945–2006), Czech horn player and music pedagogue
