= Anne McAneney =

Northern Irish trumpet player and teacher

Anne McAneney is a Northern Irish trumpet player and professor at the Guildhall School of Music and Drama. She became the first woman to hold a principal trumpet position in a UK orchestra at Sadlers Wells Royal Ballet Orchestra in 1984. She is currently sub-principal Trumpet in the London Philharmonic Orchestra.

== Education ==
McAneney grew up in Belfast, NI, and originally studied piano and violin. She recalls:

I then struggled with the violin for many years, until the school brass band offered me a cornet to join their ranks. I found this considerably easier to play and really enjoyed being in the band, but ultimately changed to the trumpet in order to play orchestral music."

From 1979 to 1982, McAneney studied BMus (Hons) trumpet at Goldsmiths, University of London. Thereafter, she completed a Certificate of Advanced Musical Studies: Orchestra Training from the Guildhall School of Music and Drama and a master's degree in music at the University of Reading. Reflecting on brass playing and gender in 2018, McAneney said:

"Historically, only the violin, flute and piano were considered to be feminine,"

"Colliery bands were male, and it took a long time for women to get involved in those. Back when I started in the mid-1980s, I was definitely a rarity. But things are changing. I have been teaching at the Guildhall School of Music for 23 years and during that time there has been a huge increase not just in trumpet players but right across the board.

"But change doesn't happen overnight if something has been a great male tradition. Some orchestras now have screened [blind] auditions, although at the London Philharmonic we don't, because people can feel that if they are seen to be a woman, they won't get through no matter how well they play."

== Professional life ==
=== Freelancer & Royal Ballet Orchestra ===
McAneney started as a freelance musician. She has played in the Vienna Musikverein, Berlin Philharmonie, Cologne Philharmonie, Carnegie Hall, Amsterdam Concertgebouw, with conductors such as Yuri Termikanov, Claus Tennstedt, Bernard Haitink and Kurt Masur. In 1984 she was appointed Principal Trumpet of the Royal Ballet Orchestra, making her the first woman to hold a principal trumpet chair in the UK. McAneney has also presented on BBC Radio 3.

=== London Brass ===
McAneney spent a 23-year tenure with the UK's premier brass ensemble, London Brass. After the group's founder, Philip Jones, retired, she took over his trumpet and flugelhorn position. This involved "quite a few hours in an audition with the Philip Jones Quintet, replacing Rod Franks and Nigel Gomm in turn."

=== London Philharmonic Orchestra ===
Since 2000, she has been sub-principal trumpet at the London Philharmonic Orchestra, and was a director of the orchestra board from 2005 until 2011. With the orchestra, McAneney has been a flugelhorn soloist in Vaughan Williams' Symphony No. 9, recorded for major films such as The Lord of the Rings and toured extensively around the world.

==== Education & Community Projects ====
McAneney has been involved with the LPO's Education & Community projects for more than 20 years. She emphasises the importance of such projects in the LPO's Tune In Newsletter:

I think it is very important to share music with as many people as possible, and I love to see the sheer pleasure on someone's face who is taking part in music-making for the first time. For the last few years I've taken part in projects for people with special needs and disabilities. in the OrchLab project we work together with Drake Music, who have developed instruments using technology such as iPads, soundbeams and switches with pre-recorded musical clips. We make music, sing and compose together, telling stories through the music. To see someone who is quadriplegic gain confidence in using the technology and by using just their chin or head movement find a means to express their inner music and feelings is indeed very rewarding.

=== BrassWorks ===
McAneney runs the publishing company BrassWorks with her husband, which sells arrangements and study books.

== Former Pupils ==
- James Fountain, Principal Trumpet of the London Symphony Orchestra, former Principal Trumpet of the Royal Philharmonic Orchestra
- Phillip Cobb, Principal Trumpet of the BBC Symphony Orchestra, former principal of the London Symphony Orchestra
- Katie Smith, LPO (extra), RPO, BBC SO, Royal Ballet Sinfonia, Britten Pears Orchestra
- Kaitlin Wild, LSO, BBC SO (extra), CBSO (extra), Royal Philharmonic Concert Orchestra
- Darren Moore, Chamber Orchestra of Europe, LPO, ENO, Hanover Band, English Baroque Soloists, His Majesty's Sagbutts and Cornetts,

== Selected discography ==
Year	Title	Label
1987	Turquoise Blue – We Are Lost	Aria
1987	London Brass – Carmen: Bold as Brass!	MCA Classics
1988	London Brass – London Brass Intrada	TELDEC
1988	London Brass – Tea for Two – Dances and Rags	TELDEC
1990	London Brass – Christmas with London Brass	Teldec Classics
1990	London Brass – Clowning Around	Teldec Classics
1991	London Brass – I Got Rhythm	Teldec Classics
1991	Eric Serra – Atlantis	Virgin
1991	London Brass – Modern Times with London Brass	TELDEC
1992	London Brass – Around the World with London Brass	Teldec Classics
1993	London Brass – Baroque	Teldec Classics
Unknown	London Brass – Romantic Journey	Teldec Classics
1993	Michael Nyman – Time Will Pronounce	Argo
1994	London Brass – Gabrieli in Venice	TELDEC
1995	Moondog – Moondog Big Band	Trimba Music
2000	London Symphony Orchestra Brass – Music for Brass Vol. 2	Naxos
2001	LPO (Haitink) – Vaughan-Williams Symphonies No. 8 & 9	EMI Classics
2001	Yasunori Mitsuda – Xenosaga	DigiCube
2002	The London Trumpet Sound Vol. 1	Cala
2003	John Surman – Free and Equal	ECM Records
2004	BBCSO (Sir Andrew Davis) – Vaughan Williams Complete Symphonies, Tallist & Greensleeves Fantasias, Lark Ascending, Wasps Overture	Warner Classics & Jazz
2013	LPO (Jurovski/Kopatchinskaja) – Prokofiev and Stravinsky	Naïve
