= Byron Fulcher =

British musician (born 1970)

- Born: 1970 (age 55–56); Cornwall, England
- Genres: Classical
- Instrument: Trombone

Byron Fulcher (born 1970) is a British musician who is the principal trombone with the Royal Ballet and Opera and the London Sinfonietta. In addition, he is professor of trombone at the Royal College of Music.

== Early life and education ==
Byron was born and raised in Cornwall, started playing trombone at the age of nine and studied with Denis Wick. From 1988 and 1992, he studied at the Guildhall School of Music and Drama under Eric Crees.

== Career ==
In 1989, Fulcher performed the British premiere of Ranki's Tales of Father Goose and has since performed the Gordon Jacob and Launy Grondahl trombone concerti in London and the Ferdinand David Concertino in Peru with the Lima Symphony Orchestra. In 2006, he performed the Derek Bourgeois Trombone Concerto with the RAF Central Band.

In 1991 Fulcher was a finalist the Shell LSO Scholarship competition, where he played a concerto in the Barbican Centre with the London Symphony Orchestra.

Fulcher has also performed at the International Trombone Festival in Helsinki, Finland (2003) and Birmingham, UK (2006).

Fulcher held the position of co-principal trombone of the Orquesta Sinfónica de Galicia, Spain before returning to London to freelance in 1993. He then worked with a wide variety of orchestras and ensembles including the Chamber Orchestra of Europe, London Symphony Orchestra, Royal Philharmonic Orchestra and BBC Symphony Orchestra. Byron became Principal Trombone of the BBC Scottish Symphony Orchestra in 2000 and moved to the Philharmonia Orchestra in September 2001. In 2009 he became Principal Trombone of the London Sinfonietta.In November 2024 he left the Philharmonia Orchestra and became Principal Trombone of the Royal Ballet and Opera, Covent Garden, London.

Fulcher was featured as soloist in the 2004 Benjamin Zander / Philharmonia recording of Mahler's Third Symphony (although the CD sleeve calls him "Brian" Fulcher).

Fulcher has given masterclasses at the Trinity College of Music and Chetham's School of Music. He also contributed to the musical score of Gladiator, The Lord of the Rings, and Wallace & Gromit: The Curse of the Were-Rabbit. He also now teaches at the Royal College of Music and Birmingham Conservatoire and is a member of the London Brass.
