= Lindsay Shilling =

British musician

Lindsay Shilling (born 4 August 1959) is principal trombone at the Royal Opera House, Covent Garden alongside Eric Crees. Prior to his appointment in 2005 he was principal trombone at the London Philharmonic Orchestra for seven years and sub-principal trombone of the London Symphony Orchestra for the 1994/5 season. He is also principal trombone for London Brass.

Shilling is professor of Trombone at the Royal College of Music. In 2004, he was producer for the debut CD of young 10-piece brass ensemble "Brass 10".

As a soloist, Shilling has performed the Derek Bourgeois Sonata from Trombone and Brass Band at the 2003 All England Master Gala Concert. In 2002, he was featured with Brian Raby and Dave Stewart in Derek Bourgeois' Concerto for Three Trombones, Strings and Percussion at the Royal Festival Hall.

His commercial recordings list includes Chicken Run, Gladiator and The Lord of the Rings.

Born in Chatteris in Cambridgeshire, England, Shilling was born the first son and second child of Roy and Eileen Shilling. He has one elder sister Margaret and one younger brother Martin. Shilling began his playing career at the age of eleven in local and national youth brass bands including Chatteris Town Band where his father Roy was the conductor. In 1977 he won an Associated Board of Music scholarship to the Royal College of Music studying with John Iveson and Arthur Wilson. Since leaving college he has built up a successful and varied career, firstly freelancing with the Royal Philharmonic and the Bournemouth Orchestras. He was asked to perform regularly with the Philip Jones Brass Ensemble, now London Brass, where he continues to play. Shilling has subsequently worked with all the major London orchestras, early and contemporary music ensembles, but still manages to maintain his links with his home where he is currently the president of Chatteris Town Band; the band where he began his playing career and a band he still plays with whenever he has the opportunity.
