= High Plains Drifter (song) =

Single by Kirk Hammett

from the EP Portals
- Released: April 15, 2022
- Genre: Heavy metal
- Length: 4:45
- Label: Blackened
- Songwriters: Kirk Hammett; Edwin Outwater
- Producer: Kirk Hammett

Music video
- High Plains Drifter on YouTube

"High Plains Drifter" is the debut single of Metallica lead guitarist Kirk Hammett, released April 15, 2022, through Metallica's Blackened Recordings. It is the lead single to Hammett's solo debut release, an EP titled Portals which came out April 23 digitally as well as on CD and an exclusive ocean blue vinyl pressing for Record Store Day. The song's name is taken from the 1973 Clint Eastwood-starring Western of the same name. The song was accompanied by an animated music video released April 22.

== Background ==
Per Hammett, the track wasn't originally intended to evoke its namesake film, but after he completed the composition he realized it "conveyed the same sentiment as the film, so the piece was christened accordingly". He further explained that it was "a two-and-a-half-minute piece" that he really liked, but "it was one of those riffs that would be hard to integrate into Metallica". He knew he wanted to use it somehow and "had been sitting outside messing around with a flamenco acoustic guitar [he'd] just bought, and it flowed out in the moment." He played the song for Metallica bandmate Robert Trujillo, who simply said "Oh, cool", and producer Greg Fidelman who responded with "Oh, OK—I kinda know what you're trying to do". That lack of interest determined for Hammett that it wouldn't be a Metallica song, so he took it to conductor Edwin Outwater who loved it, confirming Hammett's intent to release it.

== Style and reception ==
Per Rolling Stone's Jon Blistein, the song "begins with the lonesome pluck of a guitar then expands with horns, strings, piano, and marching drums", and later "Hammett injects a bit of heavy metal into the proceedings, amping up the song's energy and delivering some characteristically dazzling guitar work." Guitar World's Jackson Maxwell called the track a "Spaghetti Western-influenced instrumental" "centered around a beautiful flamenco classical guitar riff" and "featur[ing] lush, beautifully realized orchestral arrangements", adding "some prime frenzied electric chugging in as the song picks up steam" and topping the song off "with a truly epic, acrobatic solo."

Music Talkers's Nicholas Gaudet notes that the song's start "might shock Metallica fans" because even though "the metal group has never shied away from softer songs, even ballads", "the band is most notorious for the heavier, rock and metal tracks." The song contains "an acoustic guitar strumming distanced chords, tremolo strings, a piano, light percussion, and a melody played by a classical guitar, cello, and soft horns all played in unison", making "something almost fantasy-like about the instrumentation" with "an edge of that Celtic inspiration that is so dominant in fantasy music." Gaudet further notes the orchestration which is "done beautifully, sounding very minimal in production but extremely full in harmony", before a bridge section of the "perfect medium between that slow, beautiful intro" turns into "an edgier, power chord driven section that begins to introduce drums into the mix", eventually "evolv[ing] to utilizing full on electric guitars taking on both the rhythm and melody", "building off that mysterious-sounding bridge that introduced it" with the "drums come in full fledge". The song peaks with Hammett's "face-melting guitar solo", with backing instrumentation still "hypnotizingly well-done", before returning to "the more acoustic nature of its introduction" right before the end. Gaudet calls the track "an absolutely killer song, and one of the best pieces of music Kirk Hammett has written in a long time", with "something reminiscent of songs like "No Leaf Clover", when Metallica took it to the symphony hall to perform their classic [on the live album S&M]."

== Music video ==
Hammett first teased the music video on April 20 with a clip posted to social media, before the full video was released April 22. The animated video, directed by Awesome + Modest, "creates an ever-morphing psychedelic dreamscape that perfectly complements the song." Revolver's Eli Enis notes that while the song is inspired by Ennio Morricone, the video "doesn't picture a single cowboy" and is instead "a hypnotic animation of a first-person descent into a portal of madness, with various human figures from the present-day getting washed away by demons, spooky bat creatures and eventually a ghastly white being." Per ABC Audio's Josh Johnson, the video "begins with a car driving through a tunnel before crashing into another vehicle" and contains "painterly images [which] interact the dynamics of the music as they reflect the driver's life flashing before their eyes."

== Personnel ==
- Kirk Hammett – guitar, composer, producer, mixing engineer
- Edwin Outwater – keyboards, orchestra conductor, composer
- Emmanuel Ceysson – harp
- Ben Lash – cello
- Andrew Bain – horn
- Nadia Sirota – viola
- Nathan Cole and Akiko Turamoto – violin
- Eliza Bagg – vocals
- Brad Cummings – bass
- Jon Theodore – drums
- Bob Rock – mixing
- Emily Lazar and Chris Allgood – mastering engineers
- Tim Harkins – audio engineering
