= Portals (EP) =

EP by Kirk Hammett
- Released: April 23, 2022
- Recorded: July 2017; June 2019; August 2020
- Studio: Cow on the Wall Studios, North Hollywood; Makalei Studios, Oahu; Ex Machina, Paris; Henson Studios, Hollywood
- Genre: Progressive rock; metal; classical
- Length: 27:08
- Label: Blackened
- Producer: Kirk Hammett

Singles from Portals
- 1. "High Plains Drifter" Released: April 15, 2022

Portals is the debut solo EP of Metallica guitarist Kirk Hammett, released on April 23, 2022, through Blackened Recordings. The instrumental rock EP was released digitally as well as on CD and an exclusive ocean blue vinyl pressing for Record Store Day.

It consists of four instrumental tracks, described in a release as "a collection of gateways to myriad musical and psychic destinations." The songs were recorded between 2017 and 2020 in multiple locales ranging from Los Angeles to Paris to Oahu. Hammett added: "This music was created with what I describe as an Audio-Cinematic approach. They're soundtracks to the movies in your mind."

A single for the EP's third track "High Plains Drifter" was released on April 15, 2022, with an animated music video following April 22.

== Style and reception ==
Professional ratings
Review scores
Source	Rating
Brave Words & Bloody Knuckles	7.5/10
Metal Hammer	4/5 stars
Pitchfork	7.3/10
Wall of Sound	7.5/10

Brave Words & Bloody Knuckles's Nick Balazs calls the EP "more musically interesting than what his main band has done on their recent studio efforts", noting that on Metallica's records "Hammett's solos have been a point of criticism" but here "those criticisms will be put to bed as Portals shows a talented guitarist utilizing different effects and inspired sounds to create a diverse EP with much replay value." The songs "play out like mini-movies, or soundtracks to a theatrical film", showcasing Hammett's love of horror films and Clint Eastwood with "almost a '70s progressive bent". Balazs closes by calling the EP "a much pleasant surprise" and "a scarily good listen". Joe Daly of Metal Hammer notes Hammett "flex[ing] his prog and soundtrack-influenced muscles" and "synthesis[ing] his biggest influences: metal, horror movies, classical music and the works of composer Ennio Morricone". "None of the tracks sound like unused Metallica demos, nor do they bleed together in a brain-melting patchwork of sweep picking and speed runs", instead "showcas[ing] the compositional and technical strengths of one of heavy metal's most influential and visionary guitarists."

Pitchfork's Jason P. Woodbury says the EP "reveals Hammett's aspirations to be a film composer, layering crescendoing horns, flamenco interludes, swelling strings—and, naturally, oversized riffs and unhinged shredding—into compositions that could accompany zombie westerns, gothic giallo thrillers, or apocalyptic sci-fi". On the project, Hammett "often eschews ambiance and scene setting in favor of fully present rock outs", though it "doesn't matter that the territory is more Thin Lizzy than Hans Zimmer" because "it's a thrill to hear Hammett playing so unabashed." Though Hammett is "often viewed as the soft spoken counterpoint to Ulrich and Hetfield", he "relishes this star turn, and his sense of freedom in exploring beyond the confines of Metallica is palpable", bringing out music which "smartly devote[s] plenty of real estate to Hammett's familiar metalhead strengths" but also "reveal[ing] compositional breadth and dramatic flair." Wall of Sound suggests that the EP is "well worth checking out" for those who enjoy instrumental albums, and while it "probably won't hold the attention of most Metallica fans, it is a rewarding sonic experience that I will be returning to when the mood strikes."

=== Accolades ===
Publication	List	Rank
Metal Hammer	The Best Metal Albums of 2022 So Far	–
Ultimate Classic Rock	Top 30 Rock Albums of 2022	27

== Track listing ==
Portals track listing
No.	Title	Writer(s)	Length
1.	"Maiden and the Monster"	Kirk Hammett, Lani Hammett	7:17
2.	"The Jinn"	K. Hammett, L. Hammett	6:57
3.	"High Plains Drifter"	K. Hammett, Edwin Outwater	4:46
4.	"The Incantation"	K. Hammett, Outwater	8:08
Total length:			27:08

== Personnel ==
Musicians

- Kirk Hammett – guitar
- Blake Neely – string arrangements (track 1)
- Marcel Feldmar – drums (track 1)
- Mathilde Sternat – cello (tracks 1, 2)
- Greg Fidelman – bass (track 1)
- Philippe Bussonnet – bass (track 2)
- Julien Charlet – percussion (track 2)
- Abraham Laboriel – drums (track 2)
- Edwin Outwater – keyboards, orchestra leader (tracks 3, 4)
- Emmanuel Ceysson – harp (tracks 3, 4)
- Ben Lash – cello (tracks 3, 4)
- Andrew Bain – horn (tracks 3, 4)
- Nadia Sirota – viola (tracks 3, 4)
- Nathan Cole – violin (tracks 3, 4)
- Akiko Turamoto – violin (tracks 3, 4)
- Eliza Bagg – vocals (tracks 3, 4)
- Jon Theodore – drums (tracks 3, 4)
- Brad Cummings – bass (tracks 3, 4)

Technical

- Kirk Hammett – production, mixing
- Bob Rock – mixing
- Emily Lazar – mastering
- Chris Allgood – mastering
- Mike Gillies – engineering (tracks 1, 2)
- Greg Fidelman – additional engineering, recording (track 1)
- Tim Harkins – engineering (tracks 3, 4)
- Angel Hammett – photos
- Alex Tenta – design, layout

== Charts ==
Chart performance for Portals
Chart (2022)	Peak position
Swiss Albums (Schweizer Hitparade)	69
US Billboard 200	87
US Top Rock Albums (Billboard)	12
