= Philip Jones (musician) =

British trumpeter

Philip Jones CBE (12 March 1928 – 17 January 2000) was a British trumpeter and leader of an internationally famous brass chamber music ensemble.

Philip Jones was born in Bath, England. In 1944 he won a scholarship to the Royal College of Music. He became principal trumpet for most major London orchestras: The Royal Philharmonic (1956–60), the Philharmonia (1960–64), the Philharmonic (1964–65), the New Philharmonia (1965–67) and the BBC Symphony (1967–71). His playing continues a line of English trumpeters that stretches back to Ernest Hall.

In 1951 he had formed the Philip Jones Brass Ensemble, one of the first brass ensembles working regularly as a stable group. They grew from four members to ten and larger for special projects. The most usual formations were the quintet (two trumpets, horn, trombone and tuba) and the ten-piece (four trumpeters one sometimes doubling piccolo trumpet and one sometimes doubling flugel horn, horn, four trombones and tuba). The success of these formations owes much to Philip Jones's work.

After 1971 he devoted himself to it full-time and the group commanded long commitment from many fine players including: the trumpeters Elgar Howarth, John Wilbraham, Michael Laird and James Watson; horn players Ifor James and Frank Lloyd; trombonists John Iveson and Raymond Premru; and the renowned tubist John Fletcher. They made 50 recordings and toured over 30 countries finding particular popularity in Japan. Repertoire spanned from transcriptions of early music by the likes of Monteverdi, Giovanni Gabrieli, and Johann Pezel, to new works for the medium commissioned by Jones. These included pieces by Witold Lutosławski, Hans Werner Henze and Einojuhani Rautavaara; altogether they performed 87 world premieres. The ensemble's leader was noted for his meticulous preparations at every concert, lining up the music stands himself, his personal commitment being one of the reasons for the ensemble's success.

In 1986 he accidentally drove his car over his own trumpet case. He took this as the hand of fate and decided to retire from concert performances. He held posts at the Royal Northern College of Music (the institution's first head of brass) and Trinity College of Music, where he was Principal until his retirement in 1994. He was chairman of the Musicians Benevolent Fund in 1995. He was awarded the OBE in 1977 and the CBE in 1986. When not at work he divided his time between Switzerland and London.
