= James Watson (trumpeter) =

British trumpeter (1951–2011)

James Watson (4 September 1951 – 6 February 2011) held principal trumpet posts with the Royal Philharmonic Orchestra, Royal Opera House and London Sinfonietta. His international chamber music work included the Nash Ensemble and leading the world-famous Philip Jones Brass Ensemble. He was particularly active in film and television having recorded with Elton John, Paul McCartney and Peter Gabriel. Watson's conducting positions included artistic director of the Black Dyke Mills Band, 1992–2000.

Watson was artistic director of the National Youth Brass Band of Wales for six years and was vice-president of the National Youth Wind Orchestra of Great Britain. He was very active as a teacher, and was named head of brass at the Royal Academy of Music in 2001.

James Watson died on 6 February 2011 after a heart attack.

== Discography ==
Selected highlights from Watson's recordings as a player and as a conductor (not a complete list):

1. Trumpet Man (1978)
2. Norgesmeister For Brass Band 1981 with Eikanger-Bjørsvik Brass Band (1978)
3. Trittico for Brass Band (with Desford Colliery Caterpillar Band) (1989)
4. Spectacular Classics (with The Black Dyke Mills Band) (1994)
5. James Watson (with The Black Dyke Mills Band) (1994)
6. Christmas Variations (with The Black Dyke Mills Band) (1994)
7. James Watson: Trumpet Masterpieces (2005)
8. James Watson Trumpet: Greatest Hits (2011)
