= Thomas Coates (musician) =

American musician (1803–1895)

Thomas P. Coates
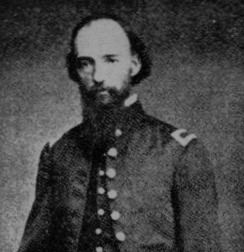
- Born: 1803; Easton, Pennsylvania, U.S.
- Died: October 11, 1895 (aged 91–92); Easton, Pennsylvania, U.S.
- Occupations: Band conductor and composer; instruments played: cornet, French horn
- Notable work: Nicknamed the "Father of Band Music in America"; conductor, regimental band, 47th Pennsylvania Volunteer Infantry (1861-1862); his "Twelfth Funeral March" was played during the funeral of U.S. President Ulysses S. Grant
- Parent(s): John Coates and Barbara (Boynton) Coates

Thomas P. Coates (1803 – October 11, 1895) was a 19th-century American musician who achieved initial prominence in Pennsylvania for his performances on the cornet and French horn. The director of Pomp's Cornet Band in Easton, Pennsylvania, he was commissioned as the first conductor of the regimental band of the 47th Pennsylvania Volunteer Infantry Regiment during the early months of the American Civil War. Post-war, he became a prolific and popular composer of band music, and was subsequently nicknamed "the Father of Band Music in America."

== Early life and education ==
Coates was born in Easton, Pennsylvania in 1803, the son of John and Barbara (Boynton) Coates who were natives of Tynemouth, Northumberland, England. His father became a naturalized citizen of the United States in Philadelphia in 1813.

== Career ==
=== Band music ===
In 1813, Coates joined a circus band but was left to fend for himself by band members sometime after they reached South Carolina. He survived by finding work as a French horn player with another band. By 1824, he was a cornetist with Pomp's Cornet Band, and was a member of that ensemble when it performed for Gilbert du Motier, the Marquis de Lafayette when the general visited Easton, Pennsylvania during his grand tour of the United States.

Continuing to expand his performing experience as both a soloist and ensemble member of the popular concert bands of Patrick Gilmore and Harvey B. Dodworth from the late 1820s into the 1830s, he subsequently was appointed as the conductor of P. T. Barnum's Hippodrome Circus band, as well as a second ensemble established by Dodworth, and Pomp's Cornet Band during the 1840s and 1850s.

In 1857, he composed a national melody for performance at the dedication of the new National Guard armory on Race Street in Philadelphia.

=== American Civil War ===
On August 14, 1861, Coates enrolled for military service in the American Civil War at Camp Curtin in Harrisburg, Pennsylvania. Recruited by Tilghman H. Good to be the leader of the regimental band of the 47th Pennsylvania Infantry Regiment, Good's newly-formed, all-volunteer unit, Coates succeeded in convincing the majority of members of Pomp's Cornet Band in Easton in joining him. He officially mustered in for duty with his musicians on August 14. An all-brass band, it was reportedly an excellent ensemble, according to newspaper accounts of the period. Coates and his bandsmen only remained in service until the late summer in 1862, however, because all regimental bands were deemed too costly to operate by the U.S. War Department at that time as expenses for the escalating war continued to mount. He and his men were honorably mustered out, per general order number 91, on September 1, 1862.

=== Post-war ===
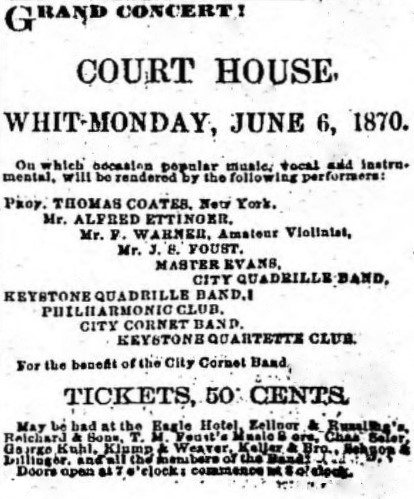
Notice in Allentown, Pennsylvania's Lehigh Register of a planned band concert at the Eagle Hotel by Thomas Coates, et al. on June 6, 1870

Returning to his post as conductor of Pomp's Cornet Band, Coates took his ensemble to Boston in 1864 for a performance with Gilmore's band. He continued to conduct and concertize over the ensuing decades, and became increasingly renowned for his compositions for band and orchestra. In 1876, The Times of Philadelphia described him as "the leading musical band instructor in the Lehigh valley for many years, his string band performed for a Hop hosted by a local militia unit, the Easton Grays, and he also wrote several new compositions expressly for the Rough & Ready Band in August of that same year."

In 1885, his "Twelfth Funeral March" was played at the funeral of former U.S. President Ulysses S. Grant.

== Death and interment ==
Coates died from heart disease in Easton, Pennsylvania on October 11, 1895. He was interred at the Easton Cemetery. The Pike County Press of Milford, Pennsylvania described him as "the leader of the first circus band in America" in its "Chronological Record of 1895."

== Legacy ==
The year after Coates' death, The Allentown Leader reported that "a marvelous tribute was paid to his talent" when his music was performed at "a monster concert in Berlin...by the new Philharmonic band," and was favorably received by the audience.

Sixteen years after his death, a monument was erected to Thomas Coates at his Easton Cemetery gravesite. On the day of the monument's dedication, May 20, 1911, a parade was held in his memory with bands and military units from Allentown and Easton marching from Center Square on Northampton Street in Easton to the cemetery prior to the ceremony which included opening and closing prayers, as well as a eulogy. The text carved on the monument memorialized him as the "Father of Band Music in America."
