= Zdeněk Tylšar =

Czech hornist (1945–2006)

Zdeněk Tylšar (29 April 1945 – 18 August 2006) was a Czech horn player and music pedagogue, brother of hornist Bedřich Tylšar. He was the principal hornist and leader of the horn section with the Czech Philharmonic Orchestra for almost 40 years. During his career, he created numerous recordings and performed worldwide.

== Biography ==
Tylšar was born in Vrahovice. He began studying violin, later switched to trumpet, and at the age of 12 he began to play the French horn. Since 1958, he studied at the Brno Conservatory and later continued at the Janáček Academy of Music and Performing Arts, under František Šolc. He graduated in 1964. In 1965, he became a member of the Czech Philharmonic Orchestra, where he worked for more than four decades. In 1968, he was appointed principal hornist and leader of the horn section of the orchestra.

In 1962 he won the 3rd prize at the Prague Spring brass competition. In 1968, he won the 1st prize and became a laureate of the same competition. In 1969, he won a special prize at a competition in Munich interpretation competition in Geneva. He has worked with a number of renowned conductors and orchestras, such as London Chamber Orchestra, Kammerorchester der Wiener Symphoniker, Mozarteum Orchester Salzburg, Helsinki Philharmonic, etc. His repertoire included the most renowned compositions for horn by Telemann, Zelenka, Mozart, Weber, Rejcha, Hindemith, Carl and Anton Stamitz and others. Since the 1970s, he made several solo recordings (i. e. for Pony Canyon and Supraphon).

He was also a sought-after chamber musician. Together with his brother Bedřich (born 1939), he made recordings of horn duets, and collaborated with several chamber orchestras, such as Collegium Musicum Pragense, Ars Rediviva, Collegium tripartitum and Solistes Européens Luxemburg.

Since the 1970s, he taught at the Academy of Performing Arts in Prague (Professor since 1997). He was an associate professor and juror of international music competitions in Czechoslovakia and abroad (Prague Spring, Munich, Osaka, Bonn).

Radek Baborák, former principal horn player of the Berlin Philharmonic, said in an interview:

For my generation of horn players, he [Zdeněk Tylšar] was absolutely a model of a musician. Fortunately, he made many recordings that we bought and listened reverently. He was always naturally self-confident and we admired how much he can do. He performed in Germany, returned overnight, played at a philharmonic rehearsal, and then immediately left on another solo concert. He lived to the fullest.

== Literature ==
- Rudolfinum Revue 2004/05, I, pp. 18–21 (in Czech)
- Tomeš, Josef et al.: Český biografický slovník 20. století/II (Paseka, Prague, 1999) (in Czech)
- Baker's Biographical Dictionary of 20th Century Classical Musicians (1997)
