= Václav Kaprál =

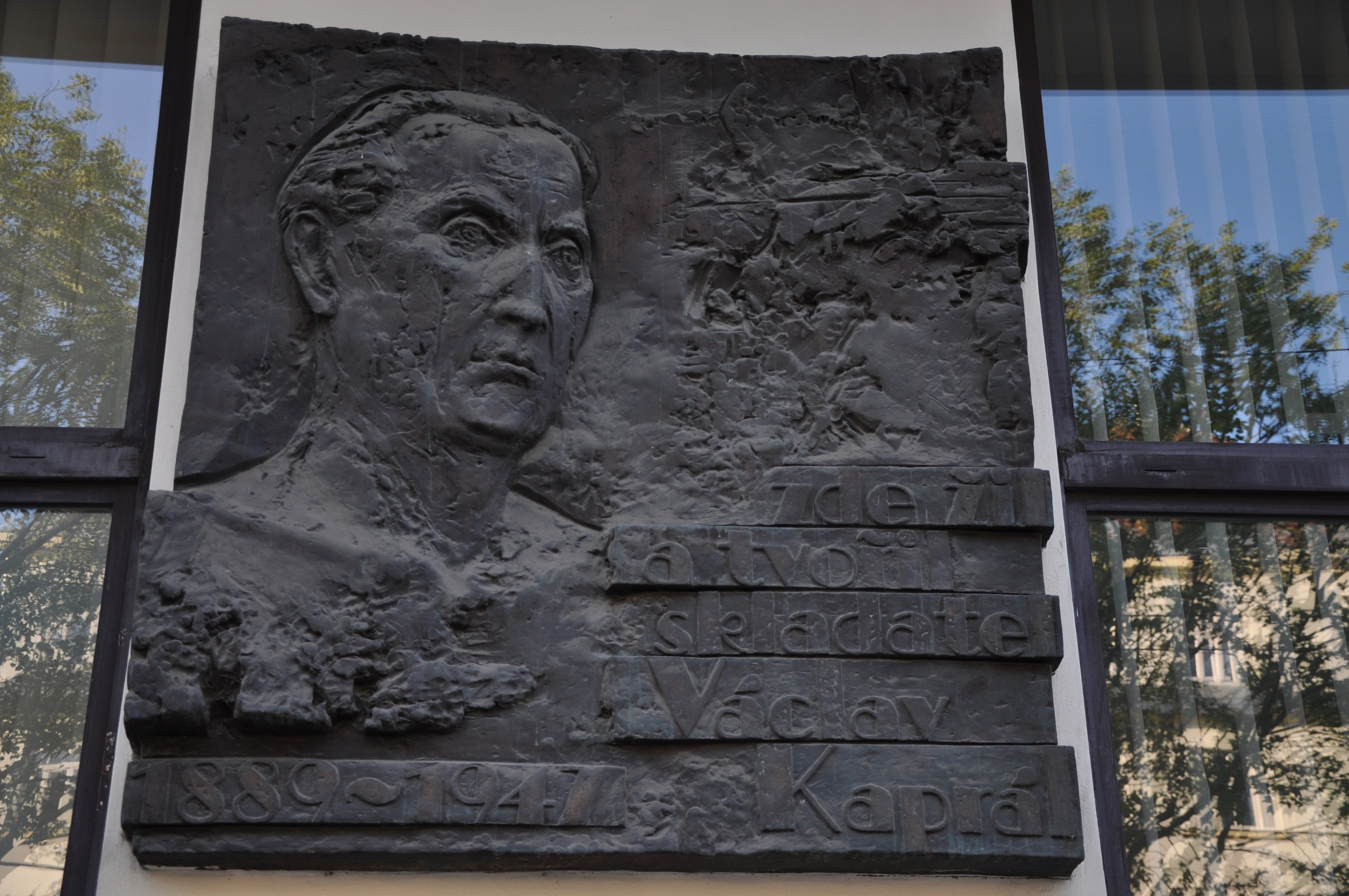
Memorial plaque of Václav Kaprál

Václav Kaprál (26 March 1889 – 6 April 1947) was a Czech composer, pianist and pedagogue.

== Life ==
Kaprál was born on 26 March 1889 in Určice. He studied composition with Leoš Janáček in the Brno Organ School (1908–1910) and with Vítězslav Novák (1919–1920) in Prague. Later, he studied piano interpretation with Alfred Cortot in Paris (1923–1924). Kaprál composed about fifty opuses, mainly solo piano, vocal, and chamber music. He was the father of Czech composer Vítězslava Kaprálová. He died on 6 April 1947 in Brno.

== Works ==
=== Orchestral music ===
- Svatební pochod for orchestra (1923)
- Dve idylky for orchestra (1931)
- Smuteční fanfáry for brass orchestra (1945)

=== Chamber music ===
- String Quartet in C Minor (1925)
- String Quartet No. 2 with Baritone Solo, on text by R. Bojko (1927)
- Píseň podzimu. Voice and string quartet (1929)
- Balada. Violoncello and piano (1946)

=== Solo piano ===
- Lyrica (1907–1915)
- Sonata I in C Major (1912)
- Nocturne (1915)
- Berceuses de Printemps (1916–1917)
- Suita Romantica (1918)
- Sonata II (1921)
- Miniatures (1922)
- Sonata III (1924)
- Con duolo, piano cycle for left hand (1926)
- Radostné chvíle (1927)
- Sonatina (1930)
- Fantazie (1934)
- Dumka (1936)
- Sonatina Bucolica (1936)
- Menculske strane volaji (1938)
- Sedlcký dance (1938)
- Sonata IV (1939)
- Dve vzpomínky (1940)
- Předtucha (1940)
- Sonatina II "Hradištská idyla" (1943–44)

=== Vocal music ===
- Nocturneta. Four songs for middle voice and piano (1911)
- Sadila fialenku v poli. Men's Choir (1911)
- Dva prosté motivy. Two songs for voice and piano (1910–1913)
- Dedikace. Voice and piano (1917)
- Modlitba. Men's Choir (1917)
- Ticho. Voice and piano (1918–1919)
- Sen zimního večera. Voice and piano (1918–1919)
- Ukolébavka. Women's choir (1920)
- Pro ni. Four songs for voice, piano and three violins (1927)
- Písen jarní. Men's choir (1931)
- Zdravice. Mixed choir (1932)
- Pouť sv. Antonína. Men's choir (1932)
- Uspávanky. Middle voice and chamber orchestra (1932–1933)
- Touha. Low voice and piano (1936)
- Ledové květy. Men's choir (1942)
- Haná zpívá. Mixed choir (1942)
- Kvítí milodějné. Four songs for two women's voices and piano (1942)
- Česká mše Svatobořická. Mixed choir and organ (1943)
- Svatobořické lidové písně. Arrangements of folk songs. Men's and women's choirs (1943)
- Bez rozloučení. Women's choir (1944)
- Javorina. Men's choir (1944)
- Beroun. Voice and piano (1944)
- Koryčany. Men's choir (1945)
