= Čechůvky =

- Village
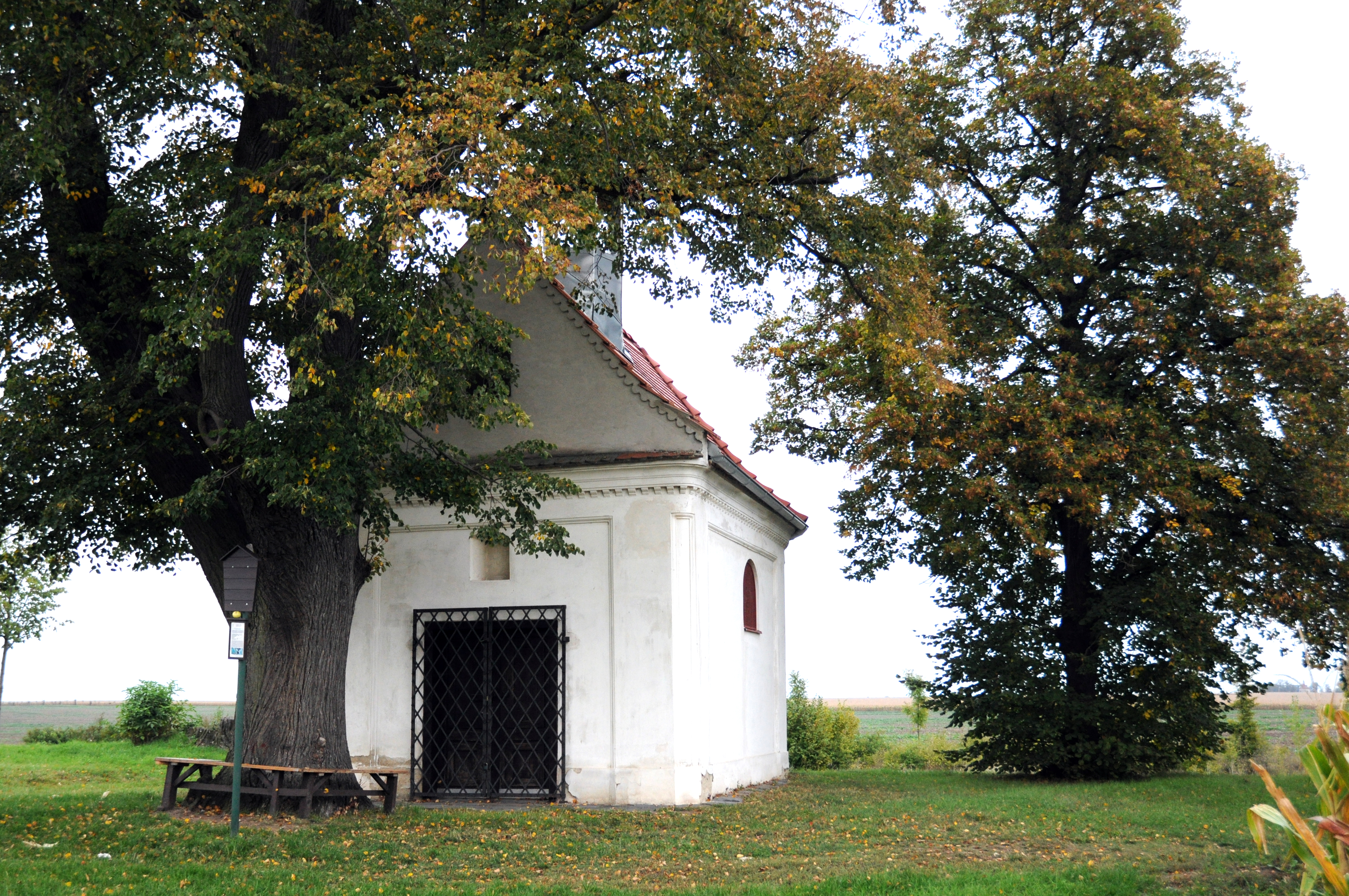
- Chapel of Saint Ottilia in Čechůvky

- Location in the Czech Republic
- Coordinates: 49°28′N 17°10′E
- Country: Czech Republic
- Region: Olomouc
- District: Prostějov
- Municipality: Prostějov
- First mentioned: 1360

Area
  - Total: 1.21 km^{2} (0.47 sq mi)

Population (2021)
  - Total: 143
  - Density: 118/km^{2} (306/sq mi)
- Time zone: UTC+1 (CET)
  - Summer (DST): UTC+2 (CEST)
- Postal code: 796 01

Čechůvky is a small village, one of the administrative parts of Prostějov in the Czech Republic. It has population of 163.

== History ==
In Čechůvky, there is the Chapel of Saint Ottilia, which was built in 1722. During the Austro-Prussian War in 1866, a battle between Prussian and Saxon troops took place there. On the place, a little cross was built to commemorate the event.

Between 1960–1973 Čechůvky was a part of Vrahovice. In 1973 both villages became parts of Prostějov.

== Literature ==
- Bartková, Hana; Dolák, Karel; Lužný, Jan. Historie Čechůvek a kaplička sv. Otýlie. Prostějov 2007. (in Czech)
- Bartková, Hana. Kříž u Čechůvek: neznámý mecenáš přežil válečnou řež. Prostějovský týden, 2008, 18(37), p. 4. Prostějovský deník, 2008, 213. (in Czech)
- Faktor, František: Popis okresního hejtmanství prostějovského. Praha 1898, pp. 60–61. (in Czech)
- Wolny, Gregor: Die Markgraftschaft Mähren, topographisch, statistisch und historisch geschildert. V. Band. Olmützer Kreis. Brno 1839, pp. 682–683. (in German)
