= Ondřej Vrabec =

Czech conductor (born 1979)

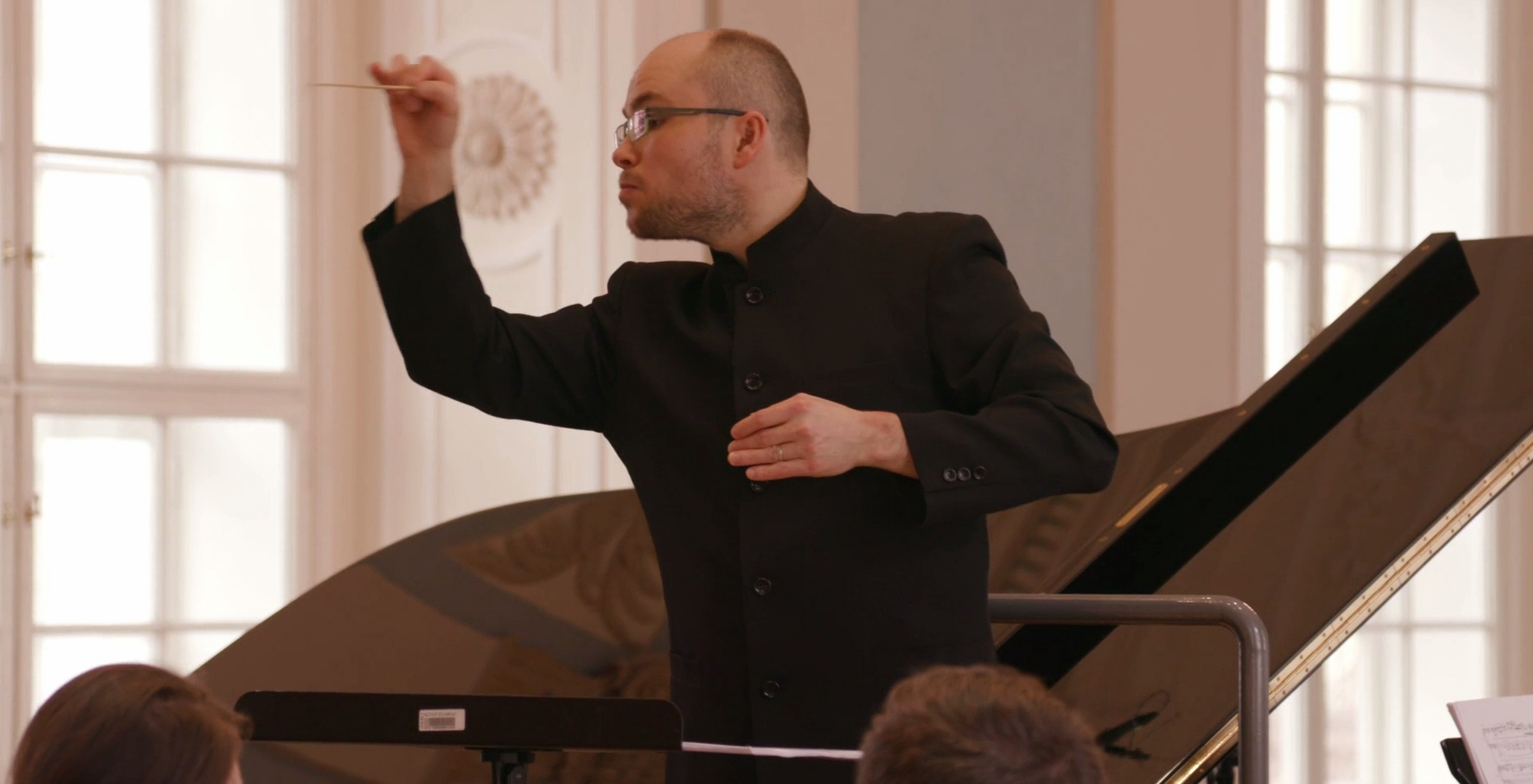
Ondřej Vrabec conducting the premiere of Seabourne's Piano Concerto no.2 at the Lichtenstein Palace, Prague

Ondřej Vrabec (born 1979) is a Czech conductor and horn player, currently solo horn of the Czech Philharmonic Orchestra. Since 2022, he has been the Chief Conductor of the Karlovy Vary Symphony Orchestra.

== Biography ==
Vrabec studied at the Prague Conservatoire: horn with Prof. Bedřich Tylšar and conducting with Profs. Vladimír Válek, Hynek Farkač, Miriam Němcová and M. Košler. He also studied conducting at the Academy of Performing Arts in Prague, under Radomil Eliška and Jiří Bělohlávek, and has been mentored in conducting by Sir John Eliot Gardiner, Benjamin Zander and others.

Vrabec first played as solo horn of the Czech Philharmonic Orchestra at the age of 17, taking the position permanently two years later and remaining in that post ever since. As a chamber musician he has been a member of the Ensemble à Vent Maurice Bourgue, Juventus Quintet, the Czech Philharmonic Horn Club, Brahms Trio Prague and the PhilHarmonia Octet.

As a soloist he has appeared widely, including with the Czech Philharmonic Orchestra, Antwerp Symphony Orchestra, Nagoya Philharmonic Orchestra, Bavarian Chamber Orchestra, Sólistes Européenes Luxembourg, China National Center for the Performing Arts Orchestra, Augsburg Philharmonic Orchestra, State Philharmonic Košice, Rzeszow Philharmonic and Lviv Philharmonic.

Vrabec has also acted as Assistant Conductor at the Czech Philharmonic Orchestra for many years - in fact, only Jiří Bělohlávek has conducted them more this century. Past guest appearances with foreign ensembles have included Japan Philharmonic Orchestra, New Japan Philharmonic, Reykjavik Chamber Orchestra, State Philharmonic Košice, Galeria Wind Orchestra Tokyo, London Soloists Chamber Orchestra, Danish National Symphony Orchestra, State Philharmonic Oradea and Lviv Virtuosi.

He is on the permanent conducting roster for Ostrava Days International New Music Festival, and has conducted at the Prague Spring International Music Festival, with Junges Klangforum Mitte Europa, at the International Music Festival Český Krumlov and at Sir John Eliot Gardiner's Anima Mundi Festival in Pisa with Brno Philharmonic Orchestra. He toured South Korea and China in 2011 and 2012 with Prague Philharmonia in the orchestra's first tours of those two countries. His opera-conducting performances include world premieres of Lists of Infinity by Martin Smolka, Encounter by Mojiao Wang and Protracted Sinuous Movement of a Longitudinal Object by Petr Cigler.

Many orchestral and chamber works have been written for Vrabec. He has a special, ongoing interest in the British composers Peter Seabourne and Robin Holloway, both of whom have written him multiple works. He premiered Seabourne's Double Concerto for Horn and Orchestra in Olomouc (2012), broadcast by Czech Radio Vltava, and conducted the premiere of the same composer's 2nd Piano Concerto in Prague in 2016.

== Released work ==
Vrabec has released more than 20 CDs as player and conductor. His 2020 disc British Works for Horn (Sheva Contemporary, UK) featured music by Robin Holloway and Peter Seabourne, and was reviewed in Gramophone, BBC Music Magazine, Limelight and others. A further disc of horn quintets was released in 2022 and reviewed in Gramophone, BBC Music Magazine, Limelight and others. As a conductor, he has recorded the complete symphonies of Andrew Downes with the Czech Philharmonic Orchestra (Artesmon/Czech Philharmonic label), The Planets by Gustav Holst, Symphony No. 2 by Arthur Honegger (Octavia Records, Japan), and viola concerti by Carl Stamitz (Supraphon Czech Republic).
