= Harvey B. Dodworth =

Bandmaster and conductor

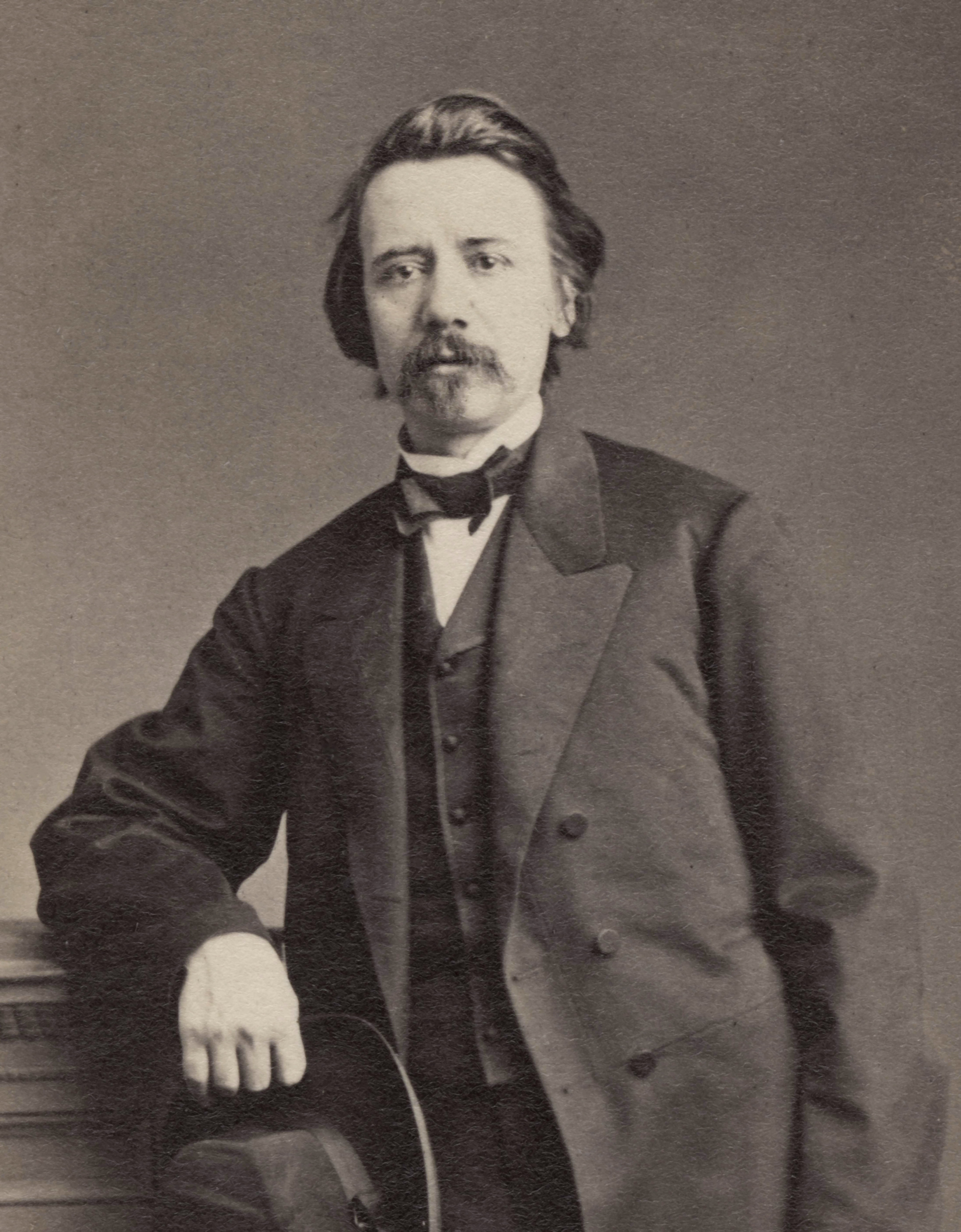
- Born: November 16, 1822; Sheffield, England
- Died: January 24, 1891 (aged 68); West Hoboken, New Jersey
- Occupations: Band conductor and music arranger; instruments played: piccolo and cornet
- Notable work: First person in the United States to arrange Richard Wagner's music for military bands
- Spouse(s): Ellwhyley (Crow) Dodworth (1827-1856); Charlotte A. (Crow) Dodworth (1835-1895)

Harvey B. Dodworth (November 16, 1822 – January 24, 1891) was a bandmaster and conductor of the 13th Regiment Band as well as the Dodworth Band, and was the first person in the United States to arrange Richard Wagner's music for military bands.

He conducted with a band of sixty musicians in between salutes and boxing matches, as well as opening in Madison Square Garden, in which he had plans to lease in 1879 to turn it into a "music garden", where he would conduct a 123-piece band. Dodworth's band also had free weekly concerts in Central Park, which drew large crowds.

== Formative years ==
He was born in Sheffield, England, and played the piccolo at the age of ten in the New York Park Theater. He played for 51 years in his father's band until October 1890.

== Music compositions created ==
- "Captain Ellis' artillery quick step." New York, New York: Firth & Hall, 1846.
- "Friendship's offering." New York, New York: Firth, Hall, and Pond, 1846.
- "Santa Clause quadrilles." New York, New York: Firth, Hall, and Pond, 1846.
- The woodbine." New York, New York: Firth, Hall, and Pond, 1847.
- "The Mercer House medley." New York, New York: Wm. Hall and Son, 1848.
- "Diligent Hose Co. quick step." New York, New York: Wm. Hall and Son, 1849.
- "Weird polka." New York, New York: Wm. Hall and Son, 1850.
- "Enchantress quadrilles." New York, New York: Wm. Hall and Son, 1851.
- "Atalanta polka." New York, New York: William Hall and Son, 1853.
- "The bell polka." New York, New York: H.B. Dodworth, 1853.
- "Dodworth's Terpsichorian repertoire, or, Library of dances." New York, New York: H.B. Dodworth, 1853.
- "Elder quickstep." New York, New York: H.B. Dodworth, 1854.
- "Philolexian quick march." New York, New York: H.B. Dodworth, 1854.
- "Columbia, queen of the land." New York, New York: H.B. Dodworth, 1862.
- "Hymn of Columbia." New York, New York: H.B. Dodworth, 1862.
- "Raw recruit, quadrille." New York, New York: H.B. Dodworth, 1862.
- "The march past." Providence, Rhode Island: D. W. Reeves, 1888.

== Death and interment ==
Dodworth died in West Hoboken, New Jersey on January 24, 1891. He was buried at the Greenwood Cemetery in Brooklyn, New York.

== See also ==
- Thomas Coates
- John Philip Sousa
