= St. Bartholomew's Church, Vrahovice =

Coordinates: 49°28′54″N 17°08′56″E

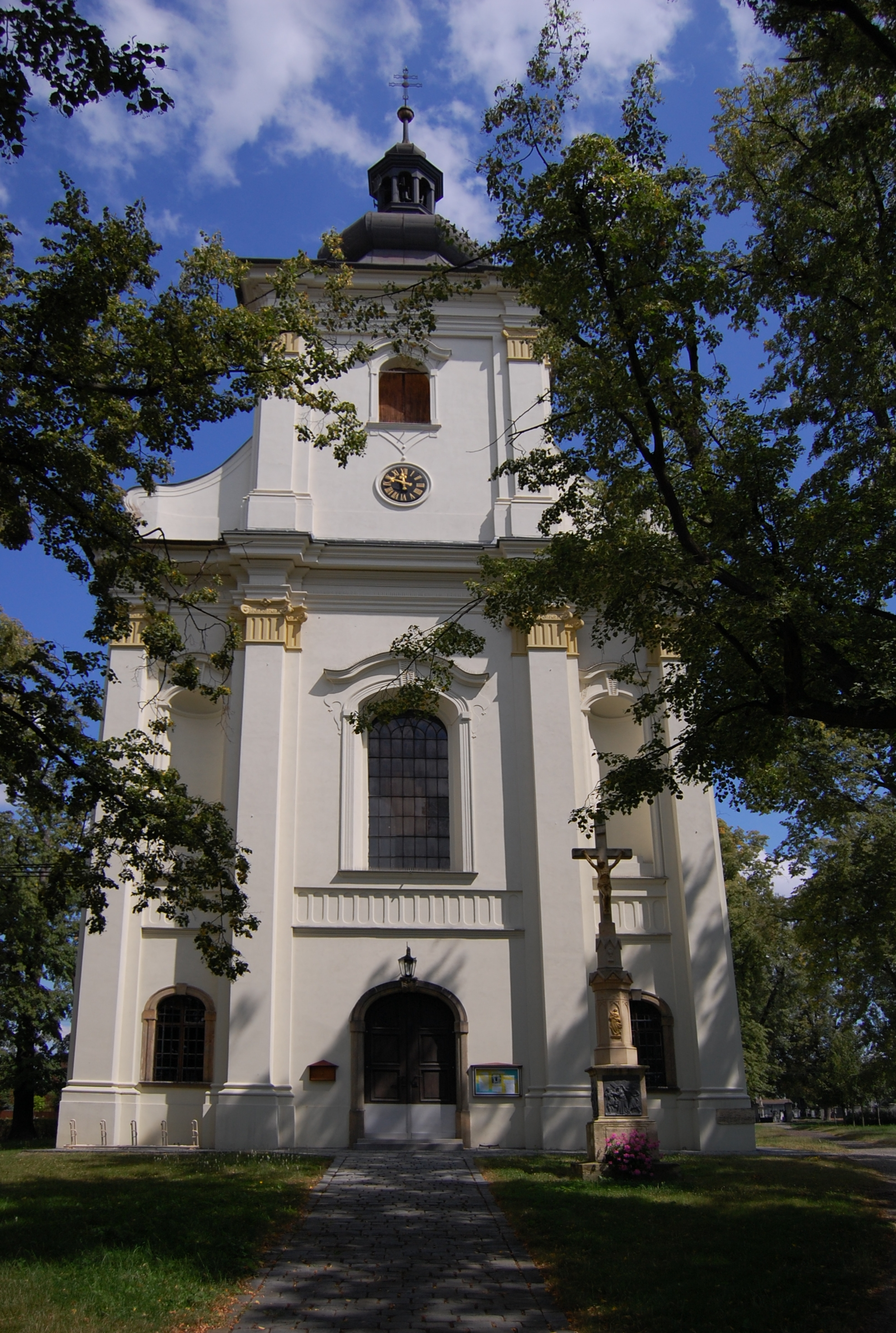
St. Bartholomew's Church in Vrahovice

St. Bartholomew's Church (Czech: Kostel svatého Bartoloměje) is a baroque building which was built from 1831 to 1836 and which is used by a Catholic Church. It lies at the main square in Vrahovice. The church is protected as a cultural monument of the Czech Republic.

St. Bartholomew's Church is the third church which was built up in Vrahovice. The first one burned at the end of the 16th century, the second one proved to be too small. The construction of the current church began in 1831. There were financial issues and its construction was finished in 1836. It was also consecrated in 1836. The interior was completed at 1890s. In the 1990s the church was fully reconstructed.

== Literature ==
- FAKTOR, František: Popis okresního hejtmanství prostějovského. Praha 1898, pg. 109–110.
- JANOUŠEK, Vojtěch: Vlastivěda moravská. Prostějovský okres. Brno 1938, pg. 257–259.
- KAVIČKA, Karel A.: Farní kostel sv. Bartoloměje v Prostějově - Vrahovicích. Brno 2015.
- MLČÁK, Leoš: Příspěvky k topografii malířství 19. století na Moravě a ve Slezsku. Vlastivědný věstník moravský, 34, 1982, p. 70.
- WOLNY, Gregor: Kirchliche Topographie von Mähren meist nach Urkunden und Handschriften. Abtheilung 1: Olmüzer Erzdiöcese: Band 1. Brünn 1855, p. 405.
