= Vrahovice =

- Village
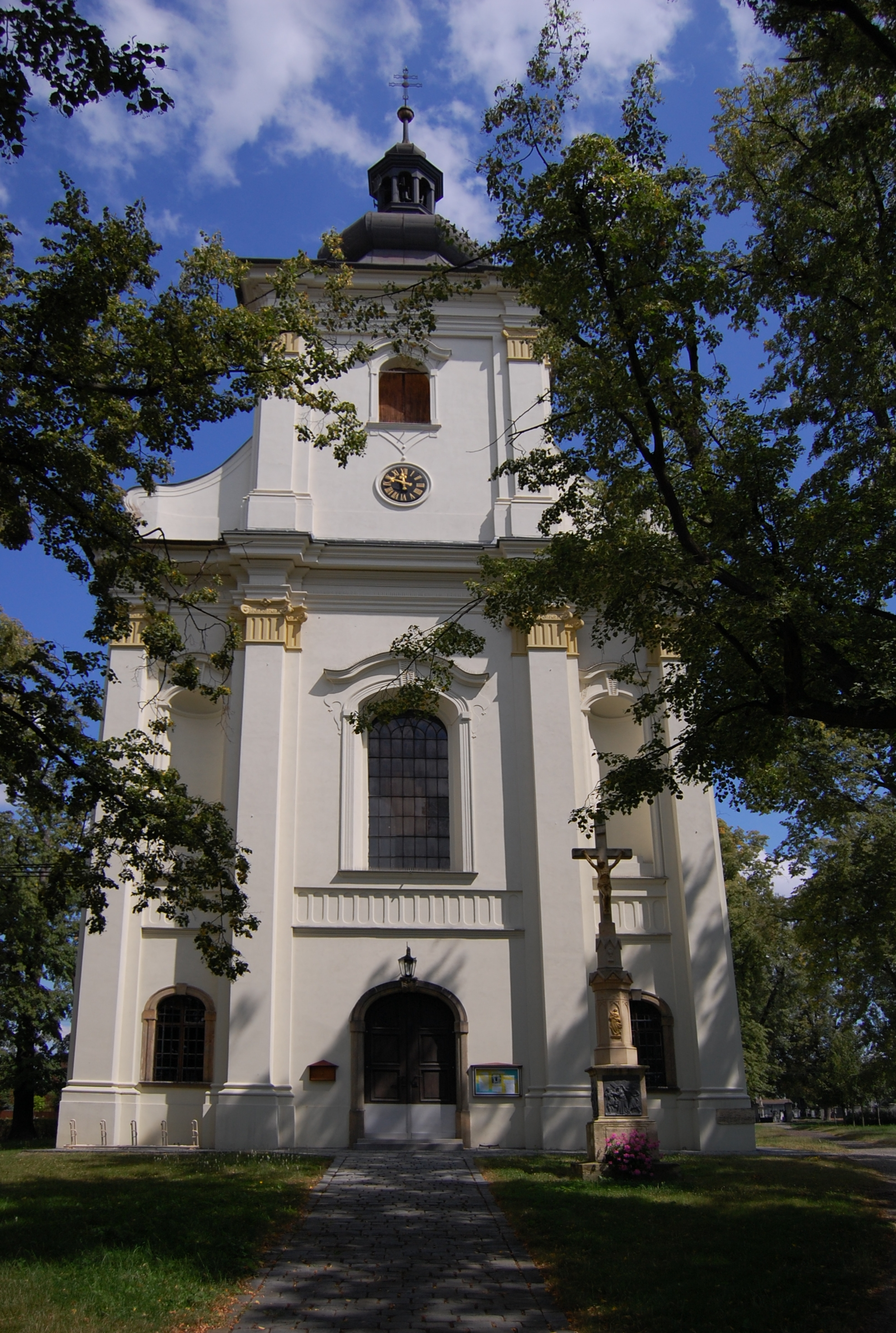
- Saint Bartholomew's Church

- Location in the Czech Republic
- Coordinates: 49°28′51″N 17°08′54″E
- Country: Czech Republic
- Region: Olomouc
- District: Prostějov
- Municipality: Prostějov

Area
  - Total: 6.22 km^{2} (2.40 sq mi)
- Elevation: 215 m (705 ft)

Population (2001)
  - Total: 3,402
  - Density: 547/km^{2} (1,420/sq mi)
- Time zone: CET
  - Summer (DST): + 1
- Postal code: 798 11
- Area code: (+420) 582
- Website: http://www.vrahovice.eu/

Vrahovice is a village and administrative part of Prostějov in the Olomouc Region of the Czech Republic. It has about 3,300 inhabitants.

== Geography ==
Vrahovice lies in the Upper Morava Valley. The watercourses Romže, Hloučela and Valová flow through Vrahovice. The highest point in Vrahovice is Vrbatecký kopec.

== History ==
The village was first mentioned in 1337. The first mention of a church in Vrahovice was in 1370. The church was destroyed in a large fire in 1587. A church constructed shortly after the fire was used until it was destroyed in 1831. A replacement church was built between 1831 and 1836 and financed by Jan Josef Count Seilern, the owner of the Kralice domain.

A village by the name of Trpenovice (now known as Trpinky), with a written history dating back to 1349, was combined with Vrahovice in 1466. From 1960 to 1973, Vrahovice also included the village of Čechůvky.

Through its history, Vrahovice has passed through the hands of several owners. In 1725, Jan Bedrich Seilern bought Vrahovice, and the Seilern family became the last to possess the village.

The first mayor of Vrahovice was Jan Frébort, who took office in 1848. The village experienced significant development during the interwar period, during the tenure of mayor Josef Stříž, when roads to Prostějov and Vrbátky and a new city hall were built. During World War II, occupying Nazi forces built an observation point on the hill above Vrahovice to monitor the railway. After World War II, there was an internment camp in the village for Germans from the Prostějov region awaiting transfer to Germany.

Between 1950 and 1954, and from 1973 until the present day, Vrahovice has been a part of Prostějov. Since the 1990s there have been advocates for its separation.

On 9 December 2004, five people were killed in the village when a truck carrying soldiers crashed into a train.

Historical population
Year	Pop.	±%
1869	767	—
1880	753	−1.8%
1890	775	+2.9%
1900	955	+23.2%
1910	1,352	+41.6%
1921	1,536	+13.6%
1930	1,760	+14.6%
1950	2,783	+58.1%
1961	2,897	+4.1%
1970	2,571	−11.3%
1980	3,321	+29.2%
1991	3,307	−0.4%
2001	3,402	+2.9%
2011	3,330	−2.1%

== Vrahovice today ==
=== Notable buildings ===
The village has a church, Saint Bartholomew's, dating from the 19th century. Other important local buildings include a monument to the Czechoslovak Legions, an 18th-century Roman Catholic vicarage, an 18th-century statue of Saint Florian, and a brick factory built at the beginning of the 20th century.

=== Infrastructure ===
Vrahovice has a common integrated transport system with Prostějov. Bus routes from Prostějov to Přerov and Tovačov run through the village. Vrahovice is located on the train route from Nezamyslice to Olomouc. The village train station was built in 1946.

The village has a primary school dating back to the 19th century.

=== Community life ===
Vrahovice is home to a Sokol branch, a volunteer fire department, and Spolek za staré Vrahovice, an association dedicated to local history research, environmental protection, and the promotion of the village. The association has renamed several streets in the village after important Vrahovice inhabitants, including Josef Stříž, František Kopečný and Zdeněk Tylšar, and has created a new park, the Arboretum Vrahovice.

There are no professional sports teams in Vrahovice. In 1930, a football team, SK Vrahovice, was established, but after the 1948 communist coup d'état, the team was banned. Its players became members of another voluntary football association, Sokol Vrahovice, which is still in existence.

== Notable people ==
- František Kopečný (1909–1990), linguist; lived and died here
- Bedřich Tylšar (born 1939), horn player and music pedagogue
- Josef Šimoník (1941–2006), chemist
- Zdeněk Tylšar (1945–2006), horn player and music pedagogue
- Rostislav Václavíček (1946–2022), footballer

== In popular culture ==
Jiří Bigas wrote a book, Vrahovice 119, about a village in the Sudetenland after the World War II. He said he named the book Vrahovice because he knew the village from his childhood.

== Bibliography ==
- Československý sborník a almanach. Politický okres Prostějov. Olomouc 1932, pg. 79–82.
- FAKTOR, František: Popis okresního hejtmanství prostějovského. Praha 1898, pg. 109–112.
- HÁJEK, Martin: Vrahovice v moderní době. Dějiny obce v letech 1885–1973. Vrahovice 2019.
- Historický místopis Moravy a Slezska 1848–1960. Svazek 5. Ostrava 1976, pg. 71–72.
- HOSÁK, Ladislav, ŠRÁMEK, Rudolf: Místní jména na Moravě a ve Slezsku II. M–Ž. Praha 1980, pg. 740–741.
- JANOUŠEK, Vojtěch: Vlastivěda moravská. Dějiny Prostějova. Prostějovský okres. Brno 1938, pg. 251–260.
- ODLOŽIL, Pavel, ODLOŽILOVÁ, Milena: Vrahovice. Přírodní poměry, historie a současnost. Vrahovice 1993.
- Prostějov. Dějiny města I. Prostějov 2000, pg. 259–266.
- PŘÍVAL, Vojtěch a red.: Prostějovsko za války. Vzpomínky a dokumenty z let 1939–1945. Prostějov 1948, pg. 164–167.
- SCHWOY, Franz Josef: Topographie vom Markgrafthum Mähren. Band 1: Olmützer Kreis. Wien 1793, pg. 503–504.
- WOLNY, Gregor: Kirchliche Topographie von Mähren meist nach Urkunden und Handschriften. Abtheilung 1: Olmüzer Erzdiöcese: Band 1. Brünn 1855, pg. 405–408.
- WOLNY, Gregor: Die Markgraftschaft Mähren, topographisch, statistisch und historisch geschildert. V. Band. Olmützer Kreis. Brünn 1839, pg. 536–537.
