= Josef Šimoník =

Czech chemist

Josef Šimoník (30 August 1941, Vrahovice – 14 September 2006, Zlín) was a Czech chemist. He has specialized in polymers.
