= Jan Lužný =

Jan Lužný (4 February 1926 – 29 January 2013) was a Czech plant-breeder and expert on gardening. Between 1965 and 1992, he gave lectures at the University of Agriculture in Brno. He wrote more than 70 papers about plant-breeding. After his retirement, he became an amateur historian and published many articles about local history of Čechůvky.

== Works ==
- EUCARPIA breeding and propagation of ornamental plants: papers submitted at the International Symposium of the University of Agriculture Brno, Faculty of Horticulture Lednice na Moravě, Prague September 16.-18.1986. Brno: University of Agriculture, 1986. 194 pp.
- Use of epispermoscopic analysis in seed assessment. [Brno], 1982.

== Honors and awards ==
- G. J. Mendel honorary medal for merit in the biological sciences (2006)
