= František Kopečný =

Czech bohemist and slavist

Doc. PhDr. František Kopečný DrSc
- Born: 4 October 1909; Určice
- Died: 27 March 1990 (aged 80); Vrahovice
- Education: Masaryk University
- Scientific career
- Fields: Czech studies and Slavistics
- Institutions: Palacký University

František Kopečný (4 October 1909 in Určice – 27 March 1990 in Vrahovice) was Czechoslovak bohemist and slavist. He was interested in etymology and dialectology.

He studied Czech and German languages at the Masaryk University. He then worked at the Palacký University. With colleagues, he wrote an Old Slavic dictionary. From 1952, he worked at Czechoslovak Academy of Sciences, where he wrote an Etymological dictionary.
