= Maryland Symphony Orchestra =

Orchestra in Hagerstown, Maryland, US

- Short name: MSO
- Founded: 1982
- Location: Hagerstown, Maryland
- Concert hall: Maryland Theatre
- Principal conductor: Elizabeth Schulze
- Website: marylandsymphony.org

The Maryland Symphony Orchestra (MSO) is an American professional orchestra based in Hagerstown, Maryland.

== History ==
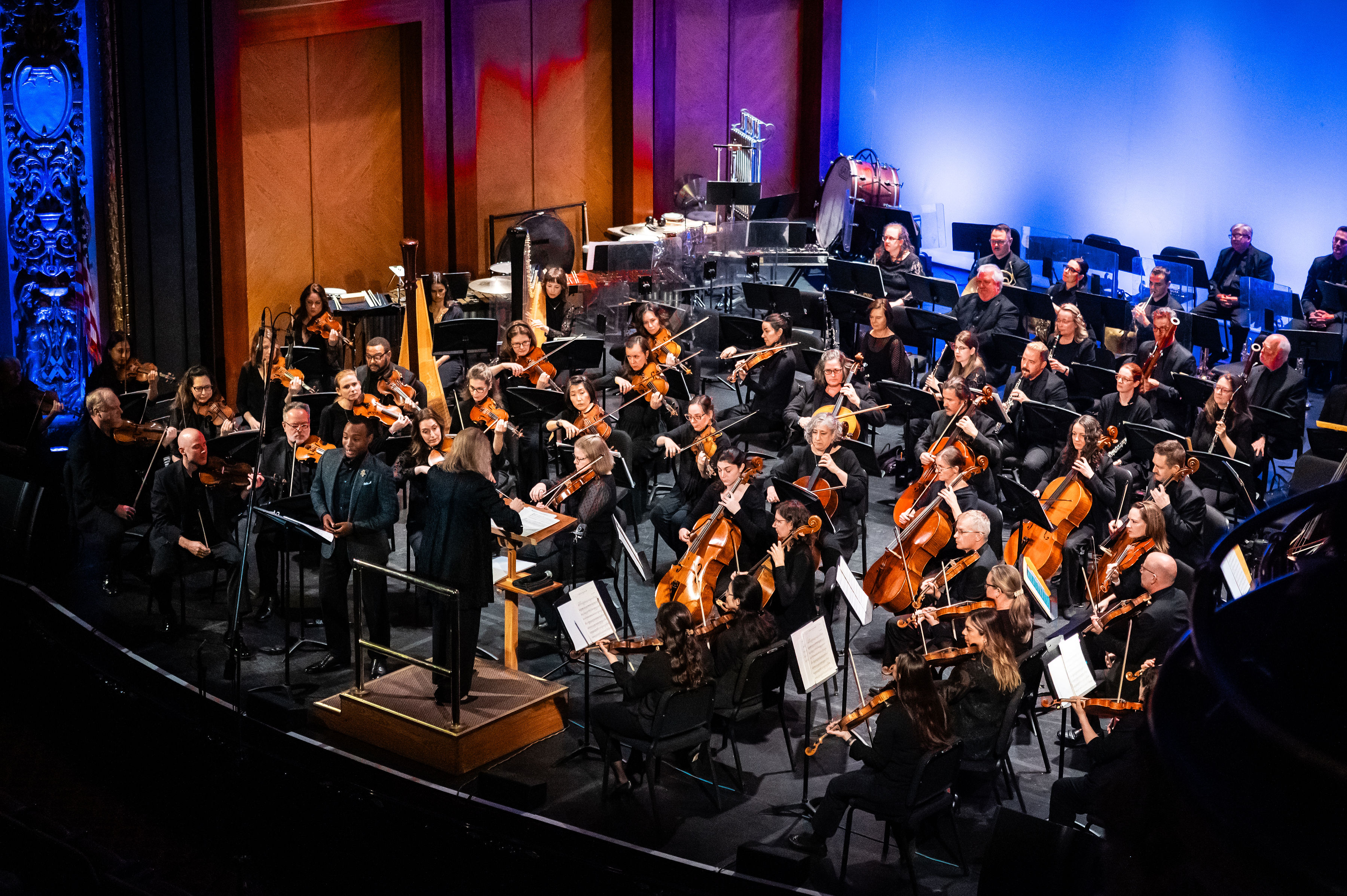
The Maryland Symphony Orchestra

The orchestra was founded in 1982 and led by its first conductor Barry Tuckwell. Tuckwell was the artistic director until the 1997–98 season. The current music director, Elizabeth Schulze, formerly associate conductor of the National Symphony Orchestra, was appointed to the position in the 1999–2000 season.

== Events ==
The MSO is proud to feature original art on the cover of its Bravo! programs. In 2024, the cover of the entire season's program books were created by Hector Fernandez, a Cuban-born artist, whose work has also been featured at the Fine Art Museum of Washington County. In 2025, each Bravo! Cover was created by a student artist in recognition of the launch of the Maryland Symphony Youth Orchestra.

The MSO educates young people through a youth orchestra, assembly presentations in schools, and via participation in the Link Up program, which allows students to engage directly with the music performed by the orchestra.
