= Určice =

- Municipality
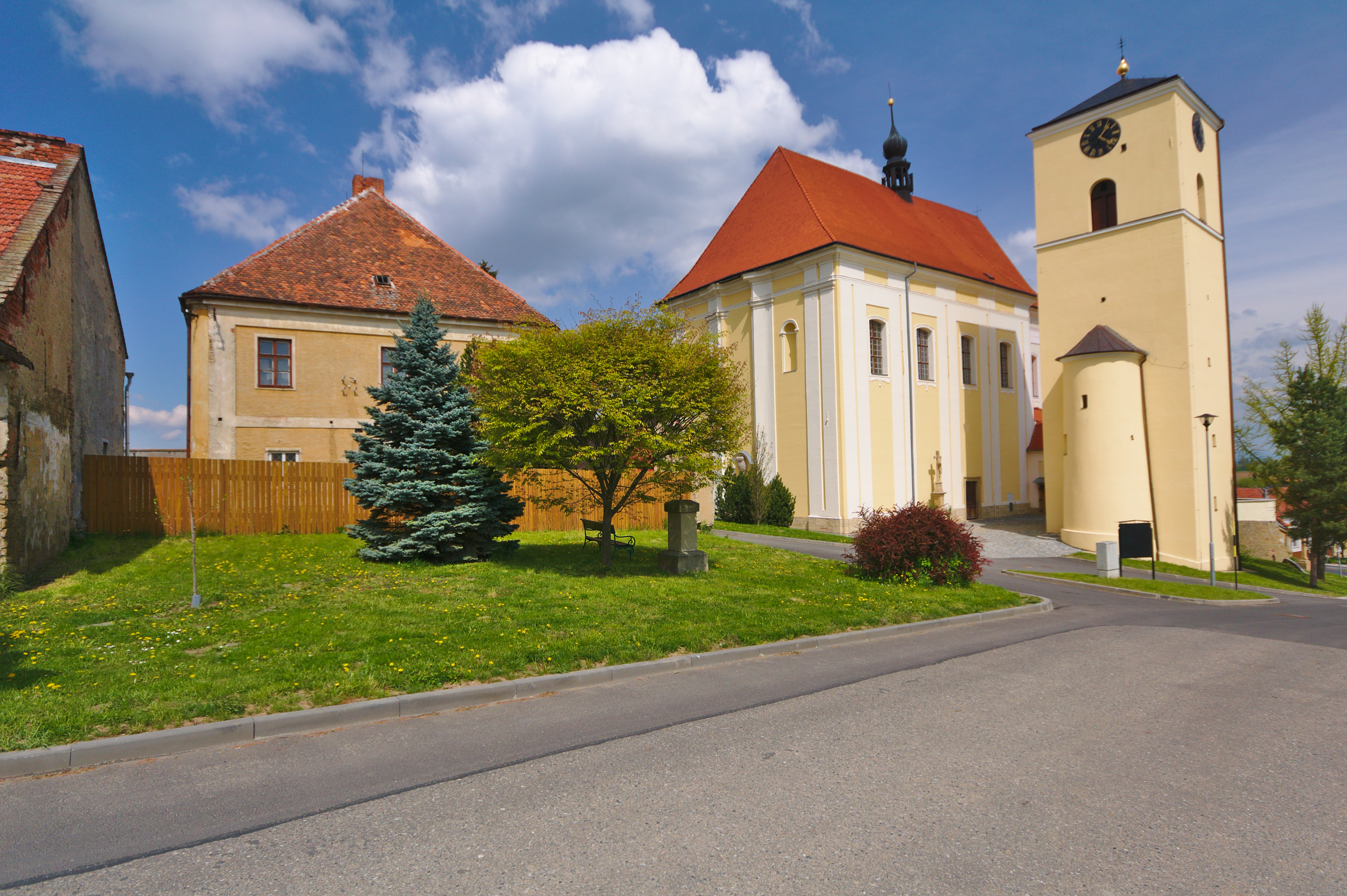
- Church of Saint John the Baptist

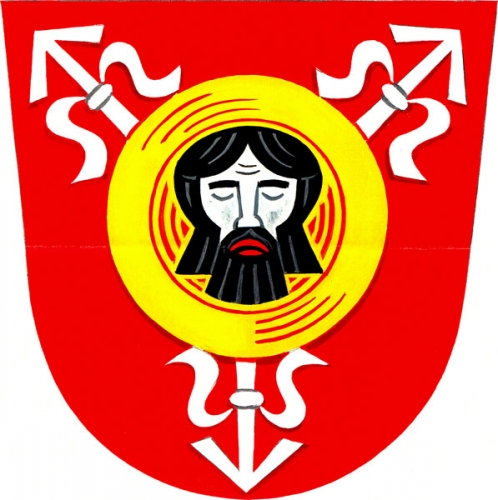
- Flag Coat of arms

- Location in the Czech Republic
- Coordinates: 49°25′50″N 17°4′23″E
- Country: Czech Republic
- Region: Olomouc
- District: Prostějov
- First mentioned: 1288

Area
  - Total: 11.21 km^{2} (4.33 sq mi)
- Elevation: 254 m (833 ft)

Population (2026-01-01)
  - Total: 1,383
  - Density: 123.4/km^{2} (319.5/sq mi)
- Time zone: UTC+1 (CET)
  - Summer (DST): UTC+2 (CEST)
- Postal code: 798 04
- Website: www.urcice.cz

Určice is a municipality and village in Prostějov District in the Olomouc Region of the Czech Republic. It has about 1,400 inhabitants.

Určice lies approximately 6 kilometres (4 mi) south-west of Prostějov, 23 km (14 mi) south-west of Olomouc, and 205 km (127 mi) east of Prague.

== Demographics ==
Historical population
Year	Pop.	±%
1869	1,136	—
1880	1,225	+7.8%
1890	1,322	+7.9%
1900	1,310	−0.9%
1910	1,402	+7.0%
1921	1,398	−0.3%
1930	1,498	+7.2%
1950	1,463	−2.3%
1961	1,541	+5.3%
1970	1,373	−10.9%
1980	1,368	−0.4%
1991	1,364	−0.3%
2001	1,336	−2.1%
2011	1,317	−1.4%
2021	1,314	−0.2%
Source: Censuses

== Notable people ==
- Václav Kaprál (1889–1947), composer and pianist
- František Kopečný (1909–1990), linguist
