= Arboretum Vrahovice =

Arboretum in Vrahovice, Czech Republic

Coordinates: 49.4796°N 17.1450°E

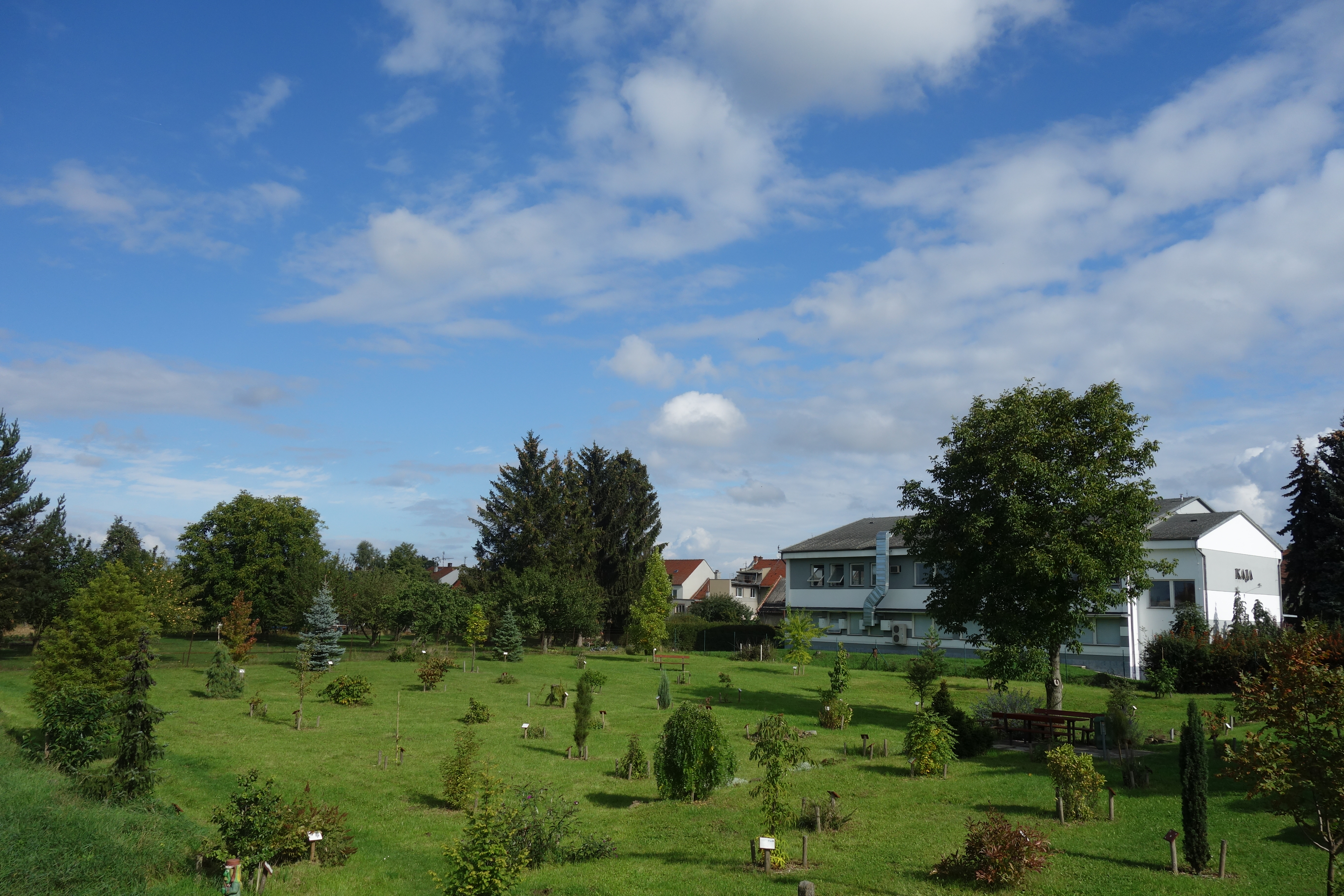
Arboretum Vrahovice

The Arboretum Vrahovice is a small arboretum in Vrahovice, Czech Republic.

The Arboretum Vrahovice was established by Spolek za staré Vrahovice in 2010 and developed between 2010 and 2015. The Arboretum contains trees and bushes originating from North America, Europe and Asia. It is open to the public without charge.

The Vrahovice Arboretum was established between 2010 and 2015 by the association Spolek za staré Vrahovice (roughly translated as "Association for Old Vrahovice"). The association continues to operate the arboretum to this day (2021).
