= Barry Tuckwell =

Australian French horn player (1931–2020)

Barry Tuckwell AC, OBE
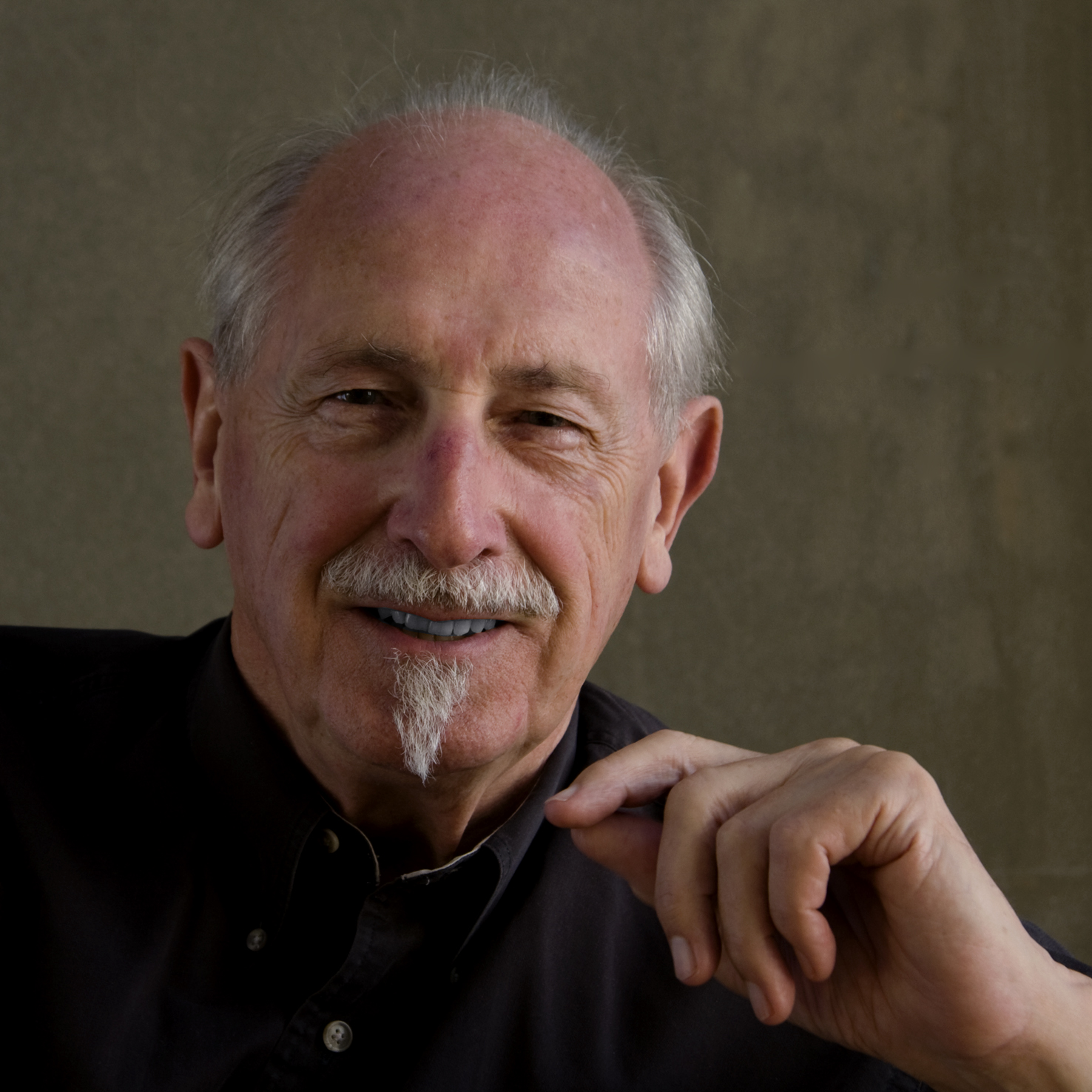
- Tuckwell in 2008
- Born: 5 March 1931; Melbourne, Victoria, Australia
- Died: 16 January 2020 (aged 88); Melbourne, Victoria, Australia
- Occupations: Horn player; Conductor; Academic teacher
- Organizations: London Symphony Orchestra; Royal Academy of Music; Tasmanian Symphony Orchestra; Maryland Symphony Orchestra
- Awards: Sir Bernard Heinze Memorial Award; JC Williamson Award

Barry Emmanuel Tuckwell (5 March 1931 – 16 January 2020) was an Australian French horn player who spent most of his professional life in the UK and the United States. He is generally considered to have been one of the world's leading horn players.

== Life and career ==
Barry Tuckwell was born on 5 March 1931 in Melbourne, son of Charles Tuckwell, an organist, and his wife Elizabeth (née Norton), a pianist. The fifth day of March is known by many as the Horn Duumvirate Date, as it was the birth date of both Tuckwell and Philip Farkas, both highly regarded horn players.

After studying the piano, organ and violin as a chorister at St Andrew's Cathedral, Sydney, Tuckwell was introduced to the French horn at age 13 and was playing professionally within six months. He studied at the Sydney Conservatorium of Music under Alan Mann, one of Australia's most influential brass players. Tuckwell said that "The horn chose me. Right from the beginning, it was something I knew I could do."

Tuckwell related an anecdote regarding his choice of instrument: sitting in a cafe one day with his sister Patricia, Charles Mackerras and a horn player from the local symphony, Patricia speculated on what Tuckwell's future in music might be. The horn player suggested, "Why not try the horn?" Tuckwell did so and within two years was playing in the Sydney Symphony Orchestra. With characteristic humour, when recounting this at the British Horn Society's festival in 2005, he turned to the audience and said, "One note at a time, piece of cake!" The horn is often considered to be one of the most difficult orchestral instruments to master. He credited his absolute pitch for helping him to play the instrument.

=== Orchestral career ===
At 15, Tuckwell was appointed by Joseph Post as third horn with the Melbourne Symphony Orchestra. A year later, he joined the Sydney Symphony Orchestra under Eugene Goossens, where he remained for three and a half years before leaving for England. His first appointment in 1951 was with the Hallé Orchestra under Sir John Barbirolli. After two years, he went to the Scottish National Orchestra under Karl Rankl and a year later to the Bournemouth Symphony Orchestra under Charles Groves. In 1955, he was appointed first horn with the London Symphony Orchestra.

During his 13 years with the LSO, a co-operative orchestra run by the players, he was elected to the board of directors and was chairman of the board for six years. The chief conductors during this time were Josef Krips, Pierre Monteux, István Kertész and André Previn.

=== Soloist ===
Tuckwell resigned from the orchestra in 1968 to pursue a career as a soloist and conductor. For the next thirty years, he carved out a career exclusively as soloist rather than combining occasional concert performances with an orchestral position or a teaching post. At the age of 65, he decided to retire. His last concert was with the Baltimore Symphony Orchestra in 1997, at the age of 65.

He was one of the most recorded horn soloists, having made over 50 recordings. He has received three Grammy Award nominations.

=== Chamber music ===
In 1962 Tuckwell formed a trio with Brenton Langbein (violin) and Maureen Jones (piano) for a performance of the Horn Trio by Don Banks, which was commissioned by the Edinburgh Festival. The trio played together for many years, touring in Europe, Asia and Australia until the death of Brenton Langbein. They recorded the Banks Trio, the Brahms Trio, and Quatre Petites Pièces by Charles Koechlin for Tudor records.

He formed a wind quintet in 1968, which also toured internationally.

=== Conducting ===
Tuckwell was also well known as a conductor, appearing with leading orchestras in Europe and the United States. For four seasons he was Chief Conductor of the Tasmanian Symphony Orchestra and in 1982 founded the Maryland Symphony Orchestra. He enjoyed a long association with the Northern Sinfonia and was appointed their Guest Conductor following an acclaimed fourteen-concert tour of North America.

Recordings as a conductor include three CDs with the London Symphony Orchestra of music by Dvořák, Elgar and Wagner. Later, he conducted the West Australian Symphony Orchestra in an ABC Classics recording of the Mozart horn concertos with soloist Lin Jiang and The Queensland Orchestra for Melba Recordings of horn concertos with Ben Jacks.

=== Writer ===
Barry Tuckwell wrote three important books on the horn and horn playing. For the Yehudi Menuhin Music Guides, he wrote the book on the horn. His definitive manual Playing the Horn was published by Oxford University Press (now out of print) as was Fifty First Exercises.

=== Teaching ===
Tuckwell was known for his master classes. He was Artist-in-Residence at Dartmouth College and Pomona College in the United States, and was Professor of Horn at the Royal Academy of Music in London from 1963 until 1974. He served as Distinguished Visiting Faculty at the Peabody Conservatory in Baltimore in the 1980s and 1990s. He held the position of Professorial Fellow at the University of Melbourne and for several years hosted the annual Barry Tuckwell Institute at Colorado Mesa University in Grand Junction, Colorado.

=== Personal life ===
Tuckwell had an older sister, Patricia, a violinist and fashion model. He was married four times: to Sally Newton, a doctor, Hillary Warburton, a divorce lawyer, to Susan Levitan, a journalist and occasional sports reporter with the Baltimore Sun, and Jenny Darling, a literary agent who had been his partner for the last 14 years of his life and whom he married the October before his death. He had a son and a daughter with Newton and a son with Warburton.

Tuckwell died in Melbourne on 16 January 2020 of complications from heart disease, at the age of 88.

== Awards and honours ==
Tuckwell was made an Officer of the Order of the British Empire at the 1965 Birthday Honours and a Companion of the Order of Australia at the 1992 Australia Day Honours.

Among the many other awards he has received are an Honorary Doctor of Music from the University of Sydney, Fellow of the Royal College of Music, Fellow of the Royal Society of Arts, the George Peabody Medal for Outstanding Contributions to Music in America, the Andrew White Medal from Loyola College and the Harriet Cohen Memorial Award.

He was also an honorary member of both the Royal Academy of Music and the Guildhall School of Music and Drama in London.

He was the first president of the International Horn Society and was honorary president of the British Horn Society and the patron of the Melbourne International Festival of Brass.

He was a National Patron of Delta Omicron, an international professional music fraternity.

=== Bernard Heinze Memorial Award ===
The Sir Bernard Heinze Memorial Award is given to a person who has made an outstanding contribution to music in Australia.

Year	Nominee / work	Award	Result	Ref.
2007	Barry Tuckwell	Sir Bernard Heinze Memorial Award	awarded	

=== Helpmann Awards ===
The Helpmann Awards is an awards show, celebrating live entertainment and performing arts in Australia, presented by industry group Live Performance Australia (LPA) since 2001. In 2007, Tuckwell received the JC Williamson Award, the LPA's highest honour, for his life's work in live performance.

Year	Nominee / work	Award	Result
2007	Himself	JC Williamson Award	awarded
