= Andrew Bain (horn player) =

- Origin: Adelaide, Australia
- Genre: Classical
- Occupations: Musician, horn player
- Instrument: Horn
- Formerly of: Los Angeles Philharmonic; Colburn School; Melbourne Symphony Orchestra; Colorado Music Festival; Australian Opera and Ballet Orchestra
- Website: Los Angeles Philharmonic Biographies

Andrew Bain is the principal horn player of the Los Angeles Philharmonic and the horn instructor at the Colburn School in Los Angeles.

== Biography ==
=== Education ===
Bain was born and raised in Adelaide, Australia. Remaining in his home town, he studied music at Brighton Secondary School's Special Interest Music Centre where he was 'Dux of Music' in 1990. Subsequently, he graduated from the Elder Conservatorium of Music at the University of Adelaide for his undergraduate studies. He left Adelaide in 1994 to study with Geoff Collinson in Sydney and Hector McDonald in Vienna. He earned a Graduate Degree in 2003, from the Hochschule für Musik in Karlsruhe, Germany, studying with Will Sanders and specializing in Chamber Music.

=== Musical career ===
Bain's career began when he won the associate principal horn position in Adelaide Symphony Orchestra, his hometown orchestra. He played there from 1997 to 2000, until he won the job in the Queensland Symphony Orchestra, where he was principal horn from 2000 to 2001. In 2001, when he began pursuing graduate work in Karlsruhe, Germany, he was principal horn in the Münchner Symphoniker. Upon returning to Australia in 2003, Andrew Bain was principal horn in the Australian Opera and Ballet Orchestra at the Sydney Opera House until 2005. In 2003, Bain also joined the Colorado Music Festival Orchestra as principal horn, as holder of the Avenir Foundation Endowed Chair, and as a featured soloist. In 2005, Bain returned to the Queensland Symphony Orchestra until he was hired by the Melbourne Symphony Orchestra in 2009.

In 2004, Bain founded the New Sydney Wind Quintet. Bain can be heard on their discography 'NSWQ Debut CD." He remained with the group until 2010.

In May 2011, Bain was hired by Gustavo Dudamel as the principal horn player of the Los Angeles Philharmonic. He holds the John Cecil Bessell Chair. He has played with the orchestra in the Walt Disney Concert Hall on significant concert series such as the Mahler Project of the 2012 season. He was principal horn on the soundtrack of Star Wars: The Force Awakens.

Bain was a lecturer in Horn at the Sydney Conservatorium from 2004 to 2009. Since 2012, He has been on faculty as the horn instructor at the Colburn School.

During his studies in Germany and his career in Australia, Bain played on a Gebr. Alexander 103. While auditioning in the United States, however, he switched to an Atkinson Geyer AG2000.

== Reviews by music critics ==
"The slow movement, with its eloquent horn solo (beautifully played by Andrew Bain), erupts into grotesque weirdness." – Mark Swed, Los Angeles Times Music Critic(12-2-2012)

"Andrew Bain's rich and nuanced horn solos became a highlight." – Mark Swed, Los Angeles Times Music Critic (10-27-2012)

Andrew Bain's horn solos soared high. The horns were magnificent in trio, and their moment was brilliant, a hallmark memory." – Theodore Bell, Culture Spot LA (10 August 2012)

"When principal horn player Andrew Bain took a solo bow, huge roars came from what were obviously horn players in the audience." – Mark Swed, Los Angeles Times Music Critic (2 December 2012)

"There was elegant horn playing from Andrew Bain." – Mark Swed, Los Angeles Times Music Critic (1-14-2012)
