= Stefan de Leval Jezierski =

American hornist (born 1954)

- Born: March 22, 1954 (age 72); Boston, Massachusetts
- Genres: Classical, jazz
- Occupation: Formerly Horn in the Berlin Philharmonic Orchestra
- Instrument: French horn

Stefan de Leval Jezierski (born March 22, 1954) is an American horn player resident in Germany.

== Biography ==
Born in Boston, Jezierski learned trumpet at age 12, then began to learn horn at age 14. He later studied horn with Myron Bloom at the Cleveland Institute of Music and with Fredrick Bergstone in high school at the North Carolina School of the Arts. While still a student, he appeared as a soloist with members of the Cleveland Orchestra in Severance Hall and was shortly thereafter appointed principal horn of the Kassel State Opera orchestra.

In 1978, at age 23, the Berlin Philharmonic and Herbert von Karajan hired Jezierski to play high horn. During his Berlin Philharmonic tenure, he co-founded the Scharoun Ensemble. He appeared regularly as a soloist and chamber musician at major music festivals and concert venues throughout Europe, America, and Asia, he has served as an honorary professor at the Shanghai Conservatory of Music. Jezierski also taught at the Berliner Philharmoniker's academy, the Karajan Akademie. His interest in playing jazz on the horn inspired him to form a jazz quintet with other top North American players living in Berlin and has led to onstage improvisations with such musicians as Nigel Kennedy.

Jezierski remained with the Berlin Philharmonic until his retirement in February 2022, the longest-serving horn player in the orchestra.
