= Radek Baborák =

Czech hornist (born 1976)

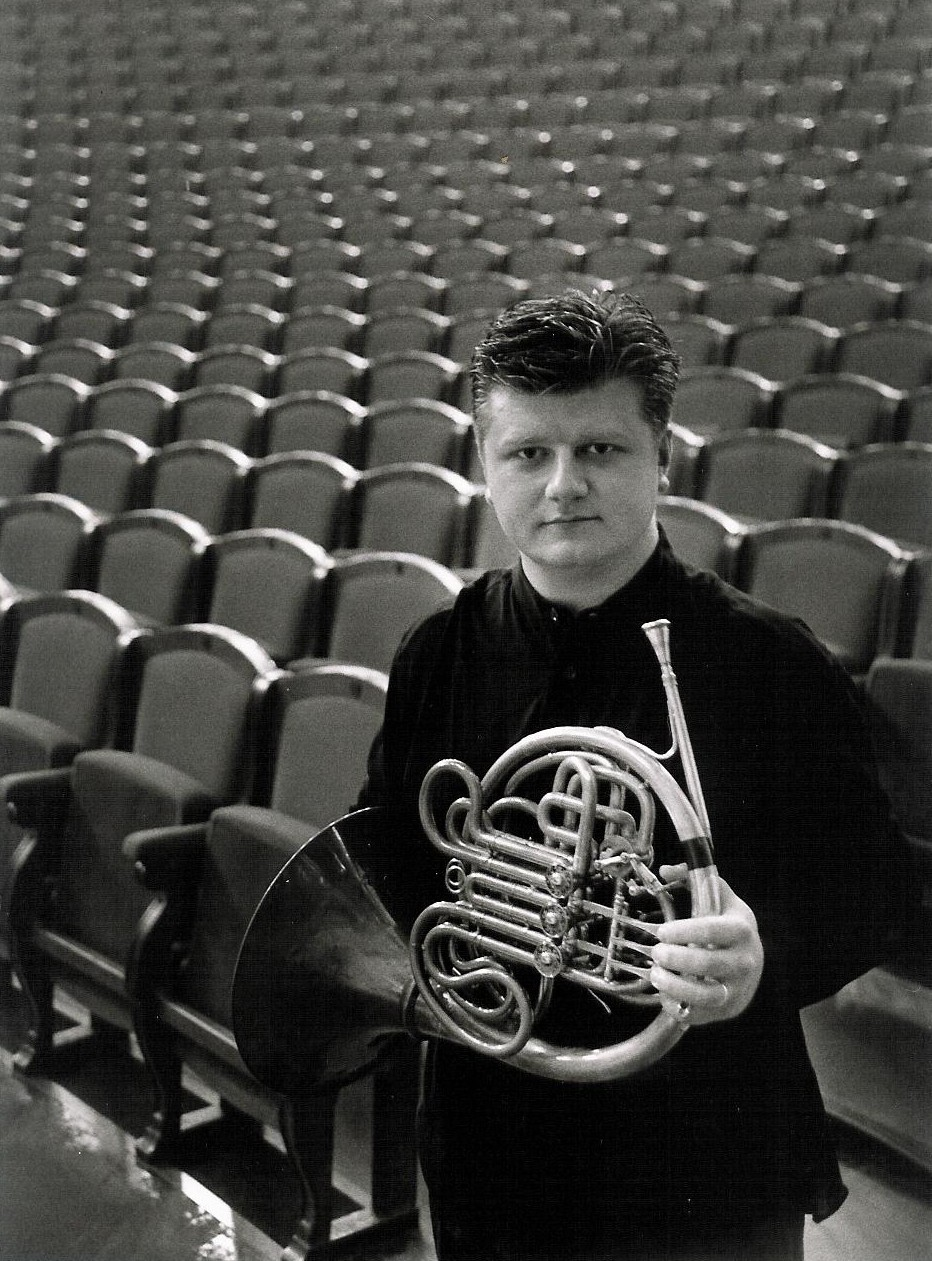
- Radek Baborák

Background information
- Born: 11 March 1976 (age 50); Pardubice, Czechoslovakia
- Genre: Classical
- Occupations: Conductor, French horn player
- Instrument: French horn
- Years active: 1988–present
- Formerly of: Czech Philharmonic; Munich Philharmonic; Bamberg Symphony Orchestra; Berlin Philharmonic

Radek Baborák (born 11 March 1976 in Pardubice, Czechoslovakia) is a Czech conductor and French horn player.

== Career ==
Radek Baborák was born into a musical family. He commenced his horn studies at the age of eight under the tutelage of Karel Krenek. At the age of twelve he was a winner of the Radio Competition Concertino Prague. Three years later he was a prize winner at the Prague Spring Competition.

From 1989 to 1994 Baborák studied horn with professor Bedřich Tylšar.

Baborák has appeared as guest artist with many notable orchestras worldwide, including the London Philharmonic Orchestra, Bavarian Radio Symphony Orchestra, Munich Philharmonic, Bamberg Symphony Orchestra, Württemberg Chamber Orchestra, Internationale Bachakademie Stuttgart, Deutsches Symphonie-Orchester Berlin, SWR Symphony Orchestra, Mozarteum Orchestra of Salzburg, the Czech Philharmonic, St. Petersburg Philharmonic, Orchestre National de Lyon, Tokyo Philharmonic Orchestra, NHK Symphony Orchestra. He has appeared several times on television and given recitals at international festivals worldwide.

At the ARD-Competition in Munich 1997 he performed with the Afflatus Quintet, winning first prize in the wind quintet category.

Baborák was only 18 when he was appointed principal horn of the Czech Philharmonic. From 1996 to 2000 he was principal horn player of the Munich Philharmonic, from 2000 to 2002 he was principal horn of the Bamberg Symphony Orchestra and from 1998 to 2000 guest professor of the Fondazione Arturo Toscanini in succession to Hermann Baumann. From 2002 to 2011 he was principal horn player of the Berlin Philharmonic. Baborák is currently a freelance player. He is distinguished visiting professor at the Barenboim–Said Akademie. He has arranged Bach’s solo cello suites for Horn, and on one memorable occasion at a concert in Teplice in 1998, entertained an audience with one of his Bach arrangements when the concert was delayed because the lights went out, due to testing the power supply in preparation for the Teplice-Sparta football match the following day.

== Honors ==
Baborák has received many honours. These include:

- Winner of International Competition Prague Spring (1992)
- Winner of International Radio Competition of UNESCO (1993)
- Second prize in Geneva 1993 (first prize was not awarded)
- First prize at the ARD-Competition, Munich (1994)
- First prize at the International Instrumental Competition, Markneukirchen (1994)
- Grammy Classic Award of the Czech Republic (1995)
- Davidoff Prize 2001
- Mostly Classic Award 2002
- Prague Classic Award 2018
