= Raymond Premru =

American trombonist, composer, and teacher

- Raymond Premru at the Oberlin Conservatory

Background information
- Born: June 6, 1934; Elmira, New York
- Died: May 8, 1998 (aged 63)
- Genres: Jazz, classical
- Occupation: Musician
- Instrument: Trombone

Raymond Eugene Premru (June 6, 1934 – May 8, 1998) was an American trombonist, composer, and teacher who spent most of his career in London, England.

== Life and career ==
The son of a Methodist minister, Premru was born in Elmira, New York and grew up in the Finger Lakes region south of Rochester. As a teenager he started playing the trombone and studied with Dale Clark at the Eastman School of Music's preparatory department. After high school he enrolled at Eastman to study trombone with Emory Remington and composition with Louis Mennini and Bernard Rogers.

Soon after graduating in 1956, he travelled to England for composition study with Peter Racine Fricker, intending to stay a few months. He began freelancing on trombone and bass trumpet, becoming a regular in the London jazz scene with groups like the Kenny Baker Dozen. In 1958, he won the bass trombone position in the Philharmonia Orchestra, where he performed for the next 30 years. In 1958 he married Susan Talbot, with whom he had two daughters.

As a session musician, he worked with Frank Sinatra, Oscar Peterson, Ella Fitzgerald, the Rolling Stones, and the Beatles (on Sgt. Pepper's Lonely Hearts Club Band). In 1964 he joined the Philip Jones Brass Ensemble, for which he wrote several pieces; he remained a member until Jones's retirement in 1987. He co-directed and composed for the Bobby Lamb/Ray Premru Big Band.

After a term as a sabbatical replacement at Eastman, he decided in 1988 to retire from the Philharmonia and return to the U.S. to accept a professorship at Oberlin Conservatory in Ohio. He continued to perform occasionally and to compose.

In 1990 he married Janet Jacobs. In 1997 he was awarded the Cleveland Arts Prize for music. During the same year he was diagnosed with esophageal cancer, and he died at the Cleveland Clinic the following May at the age of 63.

== Music ==
Premru’s compositional output runs from jazz arrangements to choral works, and includes pieces commissioned by numerous leading orchestras, festivals and organizations.

In 1962, he did work on the feature film Reach for Glory in the capacity as music conductor.

In a 1981 interview with Capital Radio, he cited as influences the music of Berg, Prokofiev, Bartók and Ives, in addition to jazz and early Bach studies. Throughout his career his language remained one of relatively conservative mid-century modernism, with a bent toward gentle lyricism; though he wrote some works in a lighter vein, and jazz idioms and techniques pop up in even his most “serious” scores.

His large-scale works include concertos for Trombone (1956), Trumpet (1983), and Tuba (1992); Music for Three Trombones, Tuba and Orchestra (1985); a Concerto for Orchestra (1976); and two symphonies (1981 and 1988). Most were commissioned and premiered by major ensembles (the symphonies by the Philharmonia and Cleveland orchestras, with conductors Lorin Maazel and Vladimir Ashkenazy, respectively); however none have been commercially recorded as of 2007 and only the Trumpet and Tuba concertos remain in print (also as of 2007).

Perhaps his most lasting legacy is in his chamber works for brass, several of which remain available in print and on recordings, including: the Concertino for trombone and woodwind quartet (1954); Music from Harter Fell (1973) and the nine-movement Divertimento (1976), both for the Philip Jones Brass Ensemble; the Brass Quartet of 1960; Two Pieces for three trombones (1951); and In Memoriam (1956) and the Tissington Variations (1970), both for trombone quartet.

== Discography ==
- Sgt. Pepper's Lonely Hearts Club Band (Parlophone, 1967)
- Respighi: Church Windows; Brazilian Impressions (Geoffrey Simon), Philharmonia Orchestra (Chandos 1984)
- ... too scared to play, High Anxiety Bones (Albany 1997)
