= Eric Crees =

British trombonist and composer

Eric Crees (born 1952) was appointed Principal Trombone of the Royal Opera House, Covent Garden (London) in 2000. Before that he spent twenty-seven years at the London Symphony Orchestra, twenty as Co-Principal Trombone. He is also a noted brass conductor, composer, arranger and teacher.

== Education ==
Eric Crees was born in London in 1952 and studied at Wandsworth School, where he worked with professional orchestras and conductors in the boy's choir. Of particular importance was the school's long association with Benjamin Britten, who wrote a solo part for Eric in Children's Crusade.

While at school he was awarded a scholarship to study part-time at the Guildhall School of Music & Drama. He went on to study music at the University of Surrey and undertook an extensive period of work with the Philip Jones Brass Ensemble. He also won the Mechanical Copyright Protection Society's 'Joyce Dixey Award' for composition. Upon graduation he joined the London Symphony Orchestra.

== Professional life ==
=== Professor ===
As Professor of Trombone at the Guildhall School of Music and Drama he taught trombonists of the next generation of orchestral principals including Helen Vollam, Byron Fulcher and Graham Lee. He was made Fellow of the School in 1991.

Crees is also a coach at music colleges and specialist schools both in the UK and abroad, including the National Youth Orchestra of Great Britain, the Ulster Youth Orchestra and the Pacific Youth Orchestra in Japan.

=== Conductor and Director ===
Crees is Director of the Royal Opera House Brass Soloists and for many years was Director of the London Symphony Orchestra Brass. With the LSO Brass they performed regularly at the Barbican Centre and made several recordings, including American Brass and Cathedral Brass for Collins Classics. These featuring many of his arrangements, including Bernstein's Suite from West Side Story which has been commercially recorded four times.

Other arrangements include Aaron Copland's El Salon Mexico and Charles Ives' Variations on 'America'. Crees also prepared a Performing Edition and directed the LSO Brass in a trio of CDs for Naxos covering the complete instrumental music by Giovanni Gabrieli.

In 1994, Crees was invited by Cala Records to arrange a number of pieces for 16 trombones from the London orchestras to record on a CD called "The London Trombone Sound". The popularity of Samuel Barber's Adagio and Eric Clapton's Layla led to more arrangements for The London Horn Sound.

Since 2011 Crees has been the artistic director of the live brass ensemble The Symphonic Brass of London. In 2020, the group released a CD of arrangements "Preludes, Rags and Cakewalks." This album "masterfully collated" the impressionism of Claude Debussy and the syncopated rhythms of Scott Joplin, as well as Auric, Milhaud and Satie. The CD is published on the MPR label.

=== Composer ===
Recent original compositions include

- Silk Street Stomp written for the Guildhall School of Music Big Band
- Two Antiphonal Fanfares Frighteners' Gallop for 8 horns commissioned by the British Horn Society
- Orage for 16 trombones, written for Bone Lab and premiered at the Dartington Summer School
- Processional for PJ written for large brass ensemble in memory of Philip Jones,
- The Birth of Conchobar for symphonic brass and percussion commissioned by the Ulster Youth Orchestra
- Three Sketches from Rackham for flute and harp.
- Flourish for solo trombone
- Carillons for six harps.

=== Juror ===
Crees is a juror for international competitions, such as the Donatella Flick Conducting competition, the Leonard Bernstein Conducting Competition, in Jerusalem, the Narbonne International Quintet Competition, the National Brass Championships, the European Brass Band Championships and the All England Masters Brass Band Championship.

== Recordings ==
- Berg Kammerkonzert - Abbado, LSO (1985, Sony SMK64504)
- Mahler Symphony No. 3 - Tilson Thomas, LSO (1987, CBS M2K44553, deleted)
- American Brass - Crees, LSO Brass (1991, Collins Classics; re-issued 2013, Alto/Musical Concepts)
- Cathedral Brass - Crees, LSO Brass (1991, Collins Classics)
- Gabrieli Music for Brass, Vol. 1-3 - Crees, LSO Brass (1995-7, Naxos 8.553609 etc.)
- London Trombone Sound (1995, Cala CACD 0108)
