= Eugene Rittich =

Canadian musician

Eugene Rittich (15 August 1928 – June 18, 2006) was a Canadian musician who taught horn, chamber music, conducting and ensemble master classes and seminars for over 30 years in Canada, the United States, Japan, Australia and New Zealand. In addition to his seminars, Rittich's services as advisor, adjudicator and jury member for Arts Councils, Universities, Music Festivals, and Competitions throughout Canada and the U.S. had helped him to guide many young players into distinguished professional careers around the world. Eugene Rittich's long association with the Toronto Symphony Youth Orchestra, the National Youth Orchestra and the Faculty of Music at the University of Toronto was honored twice by the International Horn Society in awarding him their Punto Award "in recognition of distinguished contributions and service to the art of horn playing". Rittich designed a mute, which is today the basis for most modern horn mutes. The Rittich mute is described as having a colorful sound and very even response throughout the entire range of the horn, in contrast with earlier mutes which tended to be stuffy in the low range.

Rittich was Principal horn with the Toronto Symphony Orchestra until 1974, when he was named co-principal with Fred Rizner. In 1986 he became Associate Principal to Principal horn Fred Rizner until his retirement in 1989. Before retiring in 1989 from his position as a Principal French Horn of the Toronto Symphony, Rittich had gained prominence as one of Canada's most distinguished horn players and teachers, giving performances and producing recordings with many of the world's great conductors and soloists. Numerous tours in Europe, Asia, and North America highlighted his 37-year playing career.

Rittich died in Toronto after a lengthy battle with cancer in Princess Margaret Hospital.
