= Lin Jiang =

Australian French Horn player (born 1986)

Lin Jiang is an Australian French Horn player. He was born in Shanghai in 1986 and moved to Australia at the age of five. He began playing French horn when he was ten. He has played with the Melbourne Symphony Orchestra, the Sydney Symphony Orchestra, the Tasmanian Symphony Orchestra and the West Australian Symphony Orchestra. He was the inaugural winner of the Barry Tuckwell Brass Prize at the Melbourne International Festival of Brass. He has completed his Bachelor of Music at The University of Melbourne. Currently, he is the Principal Horn of the Hong Kong Philharmonic Orchestra.
