= Joan Thelma Watson =

Canadian hornist (1953–2015)

- Born: June 28, 1953
- Died: March 12, 2015 (aged 61); Owen Sound, Ontario
- Occupation: French Horn musician
- Known for: Principal Horn, Canadian Opera Company
- Spouse: Scott Irvine
- Children: Max and Joel

Joan Thelma Watson (June 28, 1953 – March 12, 2015) was a Canadian French horn musician and teacher. She served as principal horn of the Canadian Opera Orchestra and was a founding member of the True North Brass quintet.

== Life ==
Watson was born in 1953 and married musician Scott Irvine, who became the principal tuba player of the Canadian Opera Orchestra (COC). They raised two sons together, Max and Joel.

=== Musicianship ===
Before she was named principal horn of the Canadian Opera Orchestra, Watson's professional positions included, associate principal horn of the Toronto Symphony Orchestra for 14 seasons (she won the job while she was eight-months pregnant). She was also named principal horn of the Esprit Orchestra in Toronto, the Victoria Symphony Orchestra, as well as the Pacific Opera and Vancouver Opera orchestras. She was also a founder of the True North Brass quintet.

Watson's chamber music performances were heard frequently via the Canadian Broadcasting System and with New Music Concerts. She performed as a featured soloist at the International Women's Brass Conference, the International Horn Symposium in Banff, Alberta and the International Brass Quintet Symposium in Atlanta, Georgia. In addition, Watson was a featured soloist and lecturer at the International Horn Symposium in Chicago in 2009, and in June 2010 in Toronto, she hosted the International Women's Brass Conference.

She also performed for contemporary music groups, writing that she had "backed up Rod Stewart, Andrea Bocelli, Lisa Minnelli, the Eagles, Lighthouse and Led Zeppelin."

=== Mentorship ===
As a member of the University of Toronto's faculty of music, Watson taught horn and lectured on subjects ranging from performance skills to audition preparation and "creating a passionate and fulfilling life of music making."

She served as an artist and clinician for Yamaha Canada developing a 30-year relationship that allowed her to mentor many young artists. In 2008, the Yamaha Corporation chose Watson for signature recognition on a company poster, which made her "the first woman brass player in the world featured on a Yamaha poster." The company described her as, "this country’s foremost horn virtuoso and educator, Joan leaves behind a musical legacy that will be an inspiration for generations."

Watson's final performance was on February 22, 2015. She died from breast cancer on March 12, 2015, at the age of 61 at her home in Owen Sound, Ontario.

== Selected discography ==
- Joan Watson, 2007: Songs My Mother Taught Me

== The Joan Watson Fund ==
The Joan Watson memorial fund was founded by her husband, Scott Irvine, to support the immersive Canadian Opera Orchestra Academy that Watson helped establish for young orchestra musicians.
