= Frank Lloyd (horn player) =

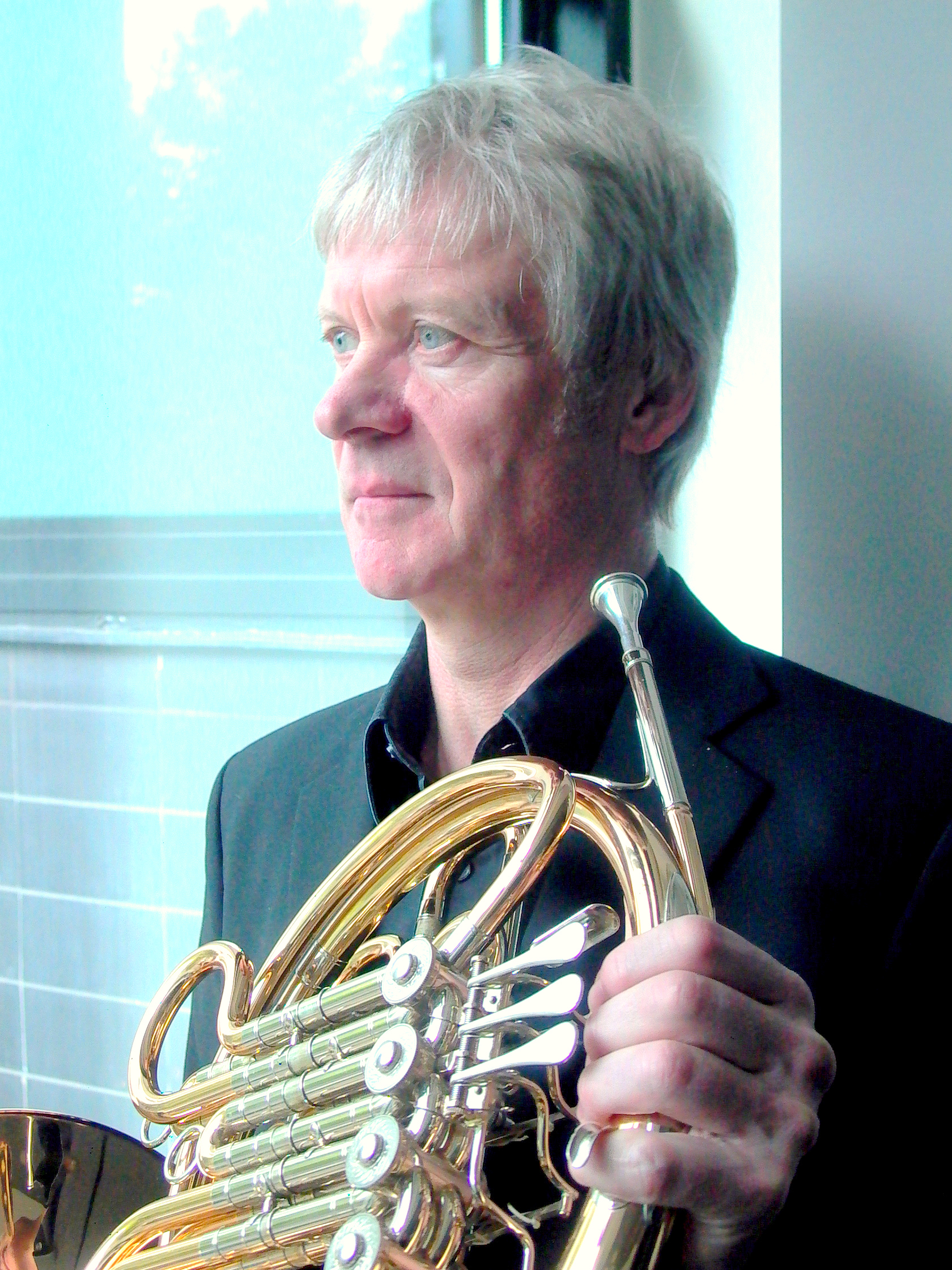

Background information
- Born: 1952 (age 72–73); Cornwall, England, United Kingdom
- Occupation: Professor of Horn at Folkwang Hochschule
- Instrument: Horn
- Website: frank-lloyd-horn.com

Frank Lloyd FRAM (1952 - ) is an English virtuoso horn player and teacher, Professor of Horn at the Folkwang Hochschule in Essen, Germany and formerly professor of horn at both the Guildhall School of Music and Drama and Trinity College of Music in London.

== Early life ==
Frank was born into a non-musical family in Cornwall, UK in 1952. Aged 13 he took up the trombone and joined his school brass band; on leaving school aged fifteen he joined the Royal Marines Band Service where he changed to the French horn. In 1975 he left the services to study at the Royal Academy of Music as a pupil of Ifor James. Within three months, however, he was offered the position of Principal Horn with the Scottish National Orchestra, now the Royal Scottish National Orchestra.

== Career ==
He played with RSNO for four and a half years before returning to London and the Royal Philharmonic Orchestra, with whom he played for three years, leaving to fulfill ever-increasing demands for his services as a soloist and chamber-music player, also joining the Philip Jones Brass Ensemble, Nash Ensemble and the English Chamber Orchestra as Principal Horn.

For some years he served as Professor of Horn at both the Guildhall School of Music and Trinity School of Music in London, until in 1998 he was appointed Professor of Horn at the Folkwang Hochschule, succeeding the legendary Hermann Baumann.

Frank has performed as a soloist throughout Europe and the United States as well as Canada, Japan, Taiwan, China and Australia. He has featured on numerous occasions at the International Horn Workshops in the United States, Japan, Europe and South Africa, and also tours Europe extensively giving master classes and performing both as soloist and with chamber groups. He was President of the International Horn Society 2006-2007 and was re-elected President in the summer of 2010/2011.

His mastery of unusual playing techniques can be heard clearly in "Tico Tico" on The London Horn Sound CD, and on several of the arrangements on the London Horn Sound 2 jazz CD Give It One.

== Honours ==
He has been awarded the Fellowship of the Royal Academy of Music.
