= Melbourne International Festival of Brass =

The Melbourne International Festival of Brass (MIFB) was an annual gathering of musicians covering all styles of composition for brass instruments, which started in 2003. The first edition of the event drew 600 brass players from all over Australia for concerts, master classes, sessions, and jazz jams.

The MIFB's honorary patron was French horn player Barry Tuckwell. He was also a conductor and educator and was a principal horn player in the London Symphony Orchestra for thirteen years. Past co-directors have included Geoff Collinson and trombonist Michael Bertoncello.

== Reception ==
Music critic Clive O'Connell called the 2005 edition of the festival "an action-packed week" and "a remarkable Melbour initiative" with "something to please every taste in [an] emphatic and rousing conclusion".
