= Simon de Souza =

Simon de Souza (born c.1964) is a French horn teacher in the United Kingdom. He has been a tutor at the Royal Birmingham Conservatoire since 2004; and Wells Cathedral School since the 1990s. He also taught at the Purcell School and the junior departments of the Trinity College of Music and Royal Academy of Music.

== Biography and playing career ==
De Souza was brought up in Henley-on-Thames. He studied under British horn teacher Ifor James, followed by postgraduate studies at Trinity College of Music in London. His performing career has seen him work with the City of Birmingham Symphony Orchestra, Bolshoi Ballet and particularly the quintet Chaconne Brass, with whom he has made four recordings and been broadcast on BBC Radio 3.

== Teaching ==
De Souza is renowned as a teacher. His past pupils include two under-18 winners of the Shell/LSO prize and a winner of the British final of the Paxman International Horn Competition; several former students hold principal positions in major British orchestras.

He has worked with many youth orchestras, including the National Youth Wind Orchestra of Wales, National Youth Wind Orchestra of Great Britain, National Children's Wind Orchestra, National Schools Symphony Orchestra and National Children's Orchestra of Great Britain. He has written on horn teaching matters for publications including Music Teacher and the Hornplayer magazine, journal of the British Horn Society, of which he was vice-chair and educational consultant.
