= Susan McCullough =

Professor, University of Denver, USA

Susan McCullough is a professor at the Lamont School of Music, University of Denver, in the United States of America, and a respected and experienced French horn recitalist. She performs regularly at horn society conferences around the world, and as a soloist in America. She often performs in tandem with her son, Jesse McCormick the second horn in the Cleveland Orchestra. In 2008, Susan Hosted the 40th International Horn Symposium at the Lamont School of Music, University of Denver. This Symposium set record attendance of over 800 participants.
