= Ifor James =

British musician (1931–2004)

Professor Ifor James (30 August 1931 – 23 December 2004) was a horn player and teacher, numbering among his pupils many future Principal Horns and horn professors at British music schools.

James was born in Carlisle, England; his father was a noted cornet player and his mother a famous soprano, Ena Mitchell. He began playing cornet in a brass band at age four and by seven he was playing paying gigs as a trumpeter. He also played the organ and was assistant organist in Carlisle Cathedral. Taking up the horn in 1951, he studied first privately and then under Aubrey Brain at the Royal Academy of Music. His professional horn playing career began with the Halle Orchestra from 1953 to 1955, then the Royal Liverpool Philharmonic Orchestra from 1955 to 1961, and was much in demand for chamber recitals and solo work.

Moving to London, he played as principal horn with many orchestras and chamber groups. He was appointed professor of horn at the Royal Academy of Music and was made a Fellow of the Royal Academy of Music (FRAM) in 1969. He was principal horn of the English Chamber Orchestra, and horn player in the Philip Jones Brass Ensemble, with whom he toured the world and made over 30 recordings. He was also appointed professor for horn at the Royal Northern College of Music (Manchester). His final teaching appointment was as professor for horn at the Staatliche Hochschule für Musik, Freiburg, Germany.

His musical taste was eclectic and he was for some time the principal conductor of the famous Besses o' th' Barn Brass Band, winning the 1978 BBC Brass Band of the Year Competition with them.

He was known among his students for sending them on curious errands such as paying hotel bills. He also had a puckish sense of humour. One former student recalls an incident where the two of them were at traffic lights in James' open-topped Morris Minor when a pretty girl walked alongside. James encouraged the younger man to "pinch her bottom as the lights go green, and I'll drive off". Needless to say when the young man did as bidden, James stayed put and turned to grin at the girl.

Welsh to the core, he famously averred that he only played the horn because he could not sing.

His former students include over 100 professional musicians, over 30 of them currently principal horn players with orchestras in numerous countries. Nine are professors at music colleges, two are the principals of German music colleges and a further six are noted soloists.

At the 2005 British Horn Festival tributes to James were read out by Barry Tuckwell, Michael Thompson and others, and a commissioned Portrait by former student Tony Randall was premiered by an octet of former students including Simon de Souza (professor of horn at Birmingham Conservatoire), Jeffrey Bryant (professor of horn at the Guildhall School of Music and Drama), Michael Thompson (Aubrey Brain professor of horn, Royal Academy of Music) and Frank Lloyd (professor of horn at the Folkwang Hochschule and president of the International Horn Society).
