= Philip Jones Brass Ensemble =

English classical brass group

The Philip Jones Brass Ensemble, founded in 1951 by the trumpeter Philip Jones, was one of the first modern classical brass ensembles to be formed. The group played either as a quintet or as a ten-piece, for larger halls. It toured and recorded extensively, and numerous arrangements were commissioned, many of which were bequeathed on Jones's death to the library of the Royal Northern College of Music.

The ensemble recorded Leonard Salzedo's signature fanfare for the Open University's television transmissions.

Following Philip Jones's retirement in 1986, a number of members of the group continued to collaborate, changing its name to London Brass.

== Members ==
=== Conductors ===
- Elgar Howarth
- John Iveson

=== Trumpet ===
- Philip Jones
- Elgar Howarth
- John Wilbraham
- Michael Laird
- Howard Snell
- David Coleman
- Norman Archibald
- Lawrence Evans
- Graham Whiting
- Peter Reeve
- John Wallace
- James Watson
- Maurice Murphy
- Stanley Woods
- William Houghton
- Paul Archibald
- Harry Dilley
- Joseph Atkins
- Nigel Gomm
- John Miller
- Rod Franks
- Graham Ashton
- Crispian Steele Perkins
- Simon Ferguson

=== French horn ===
- Ifor James
- Anthony Randall
- John Pigneguy
- James Buck
- Julian Baker
- Anthony Chidell
- Christian Rutherford
- Frank Ryecroft
- Patrick Strevens
- Frank Lloyd
- James Handy

=== Trombone ===
- Raymond Premru
- Peter Bassano
- Raymond Brown
- Roger Brenner
- John Iveson
- Harold Nash
- David Purser
- Eric Crees
- Denis Wick
- Peter Gane
- Peter Harvey
- David Moore
- Derek James
- Colin Sheen
- Stephen Saunders
- David Stewart
- Roger Harvey
- Christopher Mowat
- Michael Hext
- Lindsay Shilling

=== Tuba ===
- John 'Tug' Wilson
- John Fletcher
- John Jenkins
- James Gourlay
- James Anderson

=== Percussion ===
- James Holland
- Alan Cumberland
- David Corkhill
- Gary Kettel
- Michael Skinner
- Norman Taylor
- Stephen Henderson
- David Johnson
- Robert Howarth

== Discography ==
- 1965: The Glory of Venice
- 1965: Brass (no. 3 in Families of Orchestra series)
- 1968: Voices and Brass
- 1968: Glad Tidings
- 1969: Henze: Essay on Pigs
- 1969: Strings and Brass
- 1970: Brass now and then
- 1970: Music for the Kings and Queens of England
- 1970: Just Brass
- 1970: Atom Heart Mother (Pink Floyd)
- 1970: Schutz: The Christmas Story (Motets for Double Choir)
- 1971: Henze: The tedious Way of the Place of Natasha Ungeheuer
- 1972: Christmas in Venice
- 1972: Robert Suter
- 1972: Hymns for all Season
- 1972: Justin Connolly (Cinquepaces)
- 1972: Classics for Brass
- 1973: Bruckner Mass in E-Minor
- 1974: Monteverdi: Vespers (1610)
- 1974: Golden Brass
- 1974: Gustav Holst: Choral Music
- 1974: The Art of Toru Takemitsu
- 1974: The Philip Jones Brass Ensemble plays
- 1974: Stravinsky
- 1975: PJBE in Switzerland
- 1975: Renaissance Brass
- 1975: Purcell
- 1976: Divertimento
- 1976: Carols for Choirs
- 1976: Fanfare
- 1977: Anthony Payne: Phoenix Mass
- 1977: Pictures at an Exhibition
- 1978: Baroque Brass
- 1978: Easy Winners
- 1979: Modern Brass
- 1979: Festive Brass
- 1979: Romantic Brass
- 1980: Bach Choir Christmas Fanfare
- 1980: Langlais: Mass
- 1980: La Battaglia
- 1980: Hindemith: Concert Music
- 1981: Focus on PJBE
- 1981: Tug of War – Paul McCartney
- 1981: Toccata and Fugue
- 1981: Handel
- 1982: Noel/Christmas Brass
- 1982: The Gabrielis in Venice
- 1982: Celebration
- 1982: John Paul II. the Pilgrim Pope
- 1983: PJBE French Collection
- 1983: Sousa Marches (Philip Jones Wind Ensemble)
- 1983: Gloria – Sacred Music of John Rutter
- 1983: I was glad
- 1984: Brass at Walhalla
- 1984: Musik in der Kartause Ittingen
- 1984: Give my Regards to Broad Street
- 1985: Lollipops
- 1985: International Marches
- 1985: West Side Story
- 1986: Gabrieli
- 1986: Renaissance and Baroque Music
- 1986: PJBE Finale
- 1990: Modern Times
- Greensleves
- British Music for Brass
- Baroque Brass
- Festliche Trompetenmusik
- Renaissance Concert
- Music of the Courts of Europe
- Great Marches
- French Concert
- Encores
- Baroque Concert
- The Glory of Venice (with Kings College Chor)
- PJBE Edition
- Stereo Laboratory: Philip Jones Brass Ensemble
- Weekend Brass: Trumpet Voluntary
- Greatest Hits
- The 20th Century Album
- PJBE Live
- PJBE Live 2 (Pictures at an Exhibition)

== Sources ==
- McDonald, Donna: The Odyssey of the Philip Jones Brass Ensemble ISBN 2-88039-006-0
