= Geoff Collinson =

Geoff Collinson is an Australian horn player and was the head of the brass department at the University of Melbourne. He was the principal horn with the Australian Opera and Ballet Orchestra from 1990 until 2000; he was also guest principal horn of the Sydney Symphony Orchestra, Queensland Symphony Orchestra, and the Australian Chamber Orchestra. He is the founder and one of the directors of the Melbourne International Festival of Brass.
