= Bedřich Tylšar =

Czech horn player and music pedagogue (born 1939)

Bedřich Tylšar (9 July 1939 in Vrahovice, Prostějov, Czechoslovakia – 5 April 2026) was a Czech horn player and music pedagogue. He was the brother of hornist Zdeněk Tylšar, and a long-term member of the Czech Philharmonic Orchestra.
