= Brain (surname) =

Brain is a surname. Those bearing it include:

- Alfred Brain (disambiguation), several people

- Alfred Edwin Brain Sr. (1860–1929), English French hornist
- Alfred Edwin Brain Jr. (1885–1966), English French hornist

- Archie Brain (born 1942), British anaesthetist and inventor of the laryngeal mask
- Aubrey Brain (1893–1955), British French hornist
- Benjamin Brain (1753–1794), British boxer
- Bill Brain (1891–1961), British social activist
- Brian Brain (1940–2023), British cricketer
- Charles Kimberlin Brain (1931–2023), South African paleontologist
- Dave Brain (1879–1959), American baseball player
- David Brain (born 1964), Zimbabwean cricketer
- Davide Lewton Brain (born 1998), Monégasque-French figure skater
- Dennis Brain (1921–1957), British French hornist
- Dereck Brain (born 1936), Rhodesian field hockey player
- Desmond Brain (1909–1990), Australian cricketer
- Dow Brain, American music producer, songwriter, composer and pianist
- Errol Brain (born 1968), New Zealand rugby player
- Gary Brain (1943–2015), New Zealand timpanist and conductor
- George Brain (1893–1969), Australian politician
- Horrie Brain (1885–1966), Australian rules footballer
- Jack Brain (1920–2014), Australian rules footballer
- Jessica Brain (born 2002), British gymnast
- Jimmy Brain (1900–1971), British football player
- John Brain (1905–1961), Australian cricketer
- Jonny Brain (born 1983), British football goalkeeper
- Joseph Brain (academic) (1940–2024), American physiologist and environmental health researcher
- Joseph Brain (cricketer) (1863–1914), English cricketer
- Kenny Brain (born 1988), Canadian television personality
- Lester Brain (1903–1980), Australian air force officer and airline executive
- Louis Brain (born 1982), English-Australian football player
- Marilyn Brain (born 1959), Canadian rower
- Mark Brain (born 1978), German DJ and music producer
- Marshall Brain (1961–2024), American computer scientist and entrepreneur
- Martin Brain (1932–1970), British racing driver
- Matias Brain (born 1974), Chilean triathlete
- Matthew Brain, Australian bishop
- Michael Brain (1910–1971), Welsh cricketer
- Orlando William Brain (c. 1866–1936), Australian railway engineer
- Pat Brain (1896–1945), Welsh cricketer
- Paul Brain (born 1964), British slalom canoeist
- Peter Brain (born 1947), Australian bishop
- Ray Brain (1952–2019), Australian rules footballer
- Roy Brain (1926–2006), Australian cricketer
- Russell Brain, 1st Baron Brain (1895–1966), British neurologist
- Samuel Brain (1850–1902), British brewer and politician
- Simon Brain (born 1966), English footballer
- Stan Brain (1903–1969), Australian rugby league footballer
- Steve Brain (born 1954), English rugby union player
- Stewart Brain (born 1962), Australian judoka
- Susan Brain, British pharmacologist
- Tega Brain, Australian-born digital artist and environmental engineer
- Terence Brain (born 1938), British bishop
- Terry Brain (1907–1984), Australian rules football player
- Terry Brain Jr. (born 1938), Australian rules football player
- Terry Brain (animator) (1955–2016), animator
- Tim Brain (born 1954), British police chief
- William Brain (1870–1934), English cricketer and footballer
- William Blanch Brain (1843–1908), English mining engineer in Australia

== See also ==
- Brayne, another surname
