= Brain (disambiguation) =

A brain is a biological organ.

Brain(s) or The Brain may also refer to:

== Arts and entertainment ==
=== Films ===
- The Brain (1962 film), directed by Freddie Francis
- The Brain (1969 film), a French comedy film directed by Gérard Oury
- The Brain (1988 film), a Canadian science fiction horror film

=== Music ===
- Brain Records, a German record label prominent in the 1970s
- The Brains, an Atlanta band who did the original version of the song "Money Changes Everything"
- Brain (EP), a 1993 split EP with the bands Klinik and Paracont
- Brain (album), a 2004 album from Hiromi Uehara
- "Brain", a song on the 2006 album The Zico Chain by Zico Chain
- "Brain", a song on the 2001 album In Search of... by N.E.R.D.
- "Brain", a song by Yang Yo-seob
- "Brains", song by the band Lower Dens from their album Nootropics
- "Brains", song by the band The Presets from their album Hi Viz
- "Brains!", 2002 song by the musician Voltaire, from Boo Hoo
- "Brains", a track from the soundtrack of the 2014 Indian film Jigarthanda

=== Television ===
- The Brain with David Eagleman, a 2015 American television series
- Brain (TV series), a 2011 South Korean KBS medical drama series
- The Brain (game show), a 2014 Chinese series
- "Brains", a 2011 Voltron Force episode

=== Fictional characters ===
- The Brain (Bell comics), created by Leo Bachle for Bell Features
- Brains (Thunderbirds), in the 1960s British series
- Brain (DC Comics), created for DC Comics
- Brain, a mouse in the cartoon series Pinky and the Brain and Animaniacs
- Brain, cat in the Top Cat animated series and movie, see list of Top Cat characters
- Brain, a dog in the cartoon series Inspector Gadget
- The Brain, bear in the television series Athur, see list of Arthur characters
- Brain, a character in the film Igor
- The B.R.A.I.N. machine, from the film 9
- Dr. Brain, in the 1990s Dr. Brain series of educational games
- Brain, a character played by American rapper Lil Dicky on his EP I'm Brain

=== Novels ===
- Brain (novel), by Robin Cook

== People ==
- Brain (surname)
- "The Brain", nickname of Bobby Heenan (1944-2017), wrestler and manager
- "The Brain", nickname of Arnold Rothstein (1882-1928), gangster and gambler
- Bryan Mantia (born 1963), American rock drummer nicknamed "Brain"
- Zelda the Brain, a female professional wrestler from the Gorgeous Ladies of Wrestling
- M.C. Brains (born 1974), American rapper

== Places ==
- Brain, Côte-d'Or, France, a commune
- Brains, Loire-Atlantique, France, a commune
- River Brain, Essex, England

== Science and technology ==
- Brain (journal), a peer-reviewed scientific journal of neurology founded in 1878
- Brain (computer virus), released in 1986, considered to be the first computer virus for MS-DOS
- TheBrain, mind mapping and personal knowledge base software from TheBrain Technologies

== Other uses ==
- Brain (studio), an American art studio
- Baron Brain, a noble title
- The Brain (club), in London
- Brains Brewery, a regional brewery in Wales
- The Brain Prize, an international research award

== See also ==
- BRAIN Initiative, a 2013 American initiative to map the human brain
- CBI 5: The Brain, a 2022 Indian film
- various Irish kings:
  - Cellach mac Brain (died 834), King of Leinster
  - Cennselach mac Brain (died 770), a king of the Uí Cheinnselaig of South Leinster
  - Máel Muad mac Brain (died 978), King of Munster
  - Muiredach mac Brain (died 885), King of Leinster
  - Muiredach mac Brain (died 818), King of Leinster
  - Ruarc mac Brain (died 862), King of Leinster
- Brane (disambiguation)
- Brayne, a list of people with the surname
