= Brayne =

Brayne is a surname. Notable people with the surname include:

- Carol Brayne, British academic
- Frank Lugard Brayne (1882–1952), administrator in Punjab Province, British India
- John Brayne (c. 1541–1586), English entrepreneur
- Mark Brayne (born 1950), English psychotherapist and journalist

== See also ==
- Brain (surname)
