= Chamber Symphony No. 1 (Schoenberg) =

Musical composition by Arnold Schoenberg

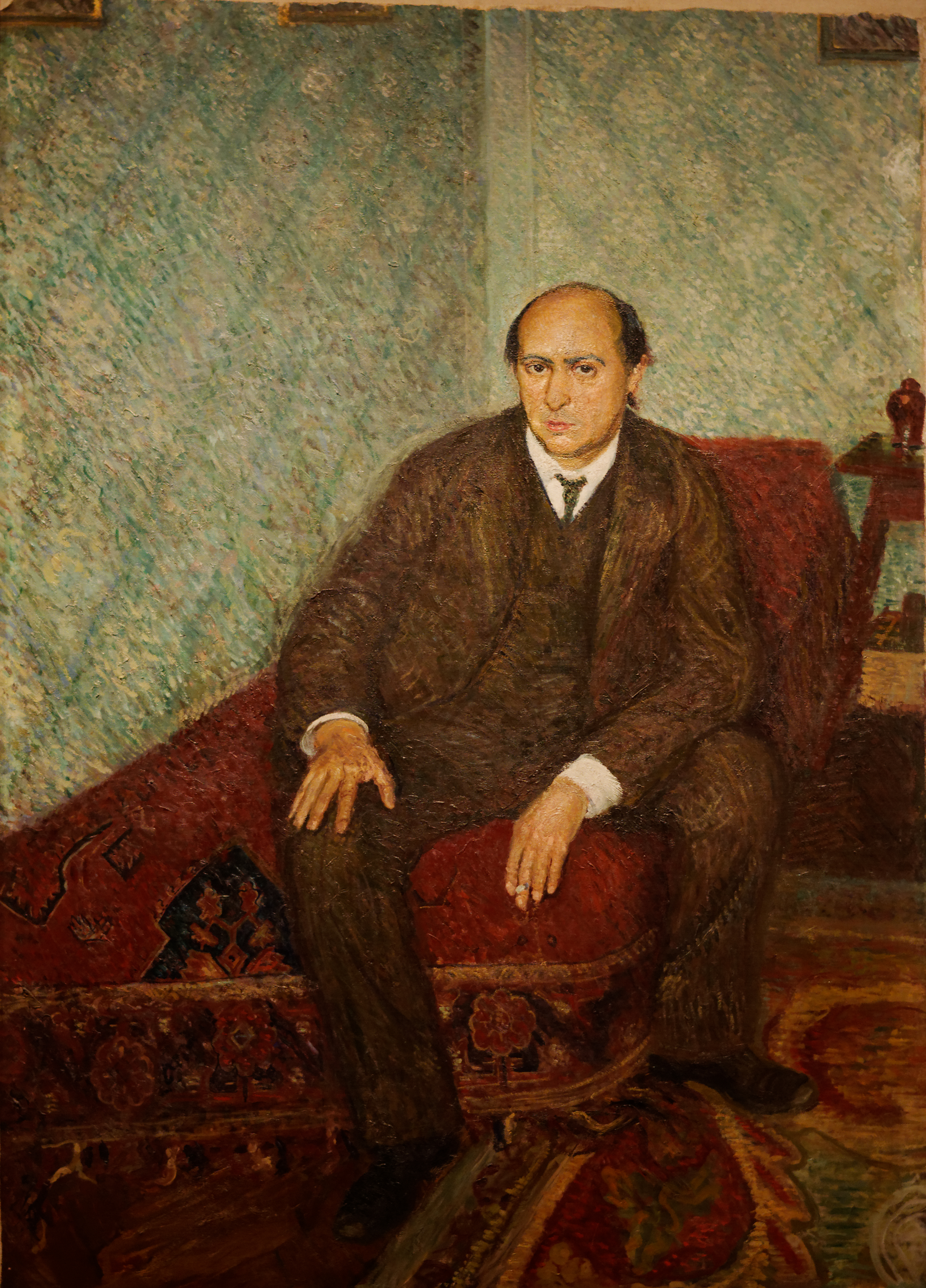
Portrait of Arnold Schoenberg by Richard Gerstl (ca. June 1905) (Vienna Museum)

The Chamber Symphony No. 1 in E major, Op. 9 (also known by its title in German Kammersymphonie, für 15 soloinstrumente, or simply as Kammersymphonie) is a composition by Austrian composer Arnold Schoenberg.

Schoenberg's first chamber symphony was finished in 1906 and premiered on 8 February 1907 in Vienna by the Rosé Quartet together with a wind ensemble from the Vienna Philharmonic, under the composer's baton. In 1913, Schoenberg again conducted the piece, as part of the famed Skandalkonzert, in which the heterodox tonalities of Schoenberg's Symphony and, more so, of his student Alban Berg's works incited the attendees to riot in protest and prematurely end the concert.

Leopold Stokowski gave the work its US premiere with the Philadelphia Orchestra on 5 November 1915. The first British performance was on 6 May (or possibly on 16 April) 1921, at the Aeolian Hall, London, conducted by Edward Clark, Schoenberg's champion and former student. The players included Charles Woodhouse (violin), John Barbirolli (cello), Léon Goossens (oboe), Aubrey Brain and Alfred Brain (horns).

The piece is a well-known example of the use of quartal harmony.

== Structure ==
The Chamber Symphony is a single-movement work which lasts approximately 20 minutes. Even though it is listed as one movement, the form can be considered as subdivided into as many as five continuous movements. Schoenberg himself outlined the following form using the rehearsal numbers as reference points:

1. Sonata. Allegro (beginning to no. 38)
2. Scherzo (nos. 38–60)
3. Development (nos. 60–77)
4. Adagio (nos. 77–90)
5. Recapitulation and finale (nos. 90–100)

Schoenberg claimed in later years that the work "was a first attempt to create a chamber orchestra."

Schoenberg makes use of a "motto" theme constructed of fourths. The "motto" theme helps delineate the structural articulation points in the piece.

The "motto" theme first appears in measure 5 and is framed by two cadences which introduce the two main key areas.

Cadence 1 in F major:

Cadence 2 in E major:

Schoenberg's concept of developing variation can be observed in the relationship of the Scherzo theme to the rising chromatic line in the 2nd Violin part in Cadence 1,

as well as in the relationship of the slow movement theme to Cadence 2.

== Instrumentation ==
It is scored for the following instruments:

1 flute (doubling piccolo)
1 oboe
1 English horn
1 E♭ clarinet
1 clarinet
1 bass clarinet
1 bassoon
1 contrabassoon

2 Vienna horns

1 violin I
1 violin II
1 viola
1 cello
1 double bass

Schoenberg respected the classical arrangement of the musicians on stage, instructing that all strings should be seated in the front row, the winds in the second row, and all the bass sounds should be grouped together. Although this composition is commonly called a chamber work, its performance requires a conductor. Some critics and conductors have claimed that an ensemble formed of ten winds and only five strings is inherently unbalanced; however, some of the voices are doubled so that no instrument is playing one-on-one against another.

== Arrangements ==
- The composer himself arranged this piece for piano four hands in 1906. He also revised the composition for large orchestra in 1923 and again in 1935, which was catalogued as Op. 9b. The latter was premiered in Los Angeles by Schoenberg himself.
- Fellow composer Alban Berg also arranged the composition for two pianos in 1914.
- Between 1922 and 1923, at Schoenberg's suggestion his disciple Anton Webern made an arrangement for this composition scored for violin, flute (or second violin), clarinet (or viola), cello, and piano; this arrangement was intended to be played alongside Pierrot lunaire, which is similarly scored.

== Notable recordings ==
Chamber Symphony No. 1 is one of the most recorded of Schoenberg's works and has received attention from conductors including Pierre Boulez, Simon Rattle, Riccardo Chailly, Claudio Abbado, Giuseppe Sinopoli, Zubin Mehta, and chamber groups such as the Hyperion Ensemble, Hagen Quartett and Orpheus. A 1998 performance conducted by Robert Craft on the Koch International Classics label and reissued in 2007 on Naxos received a positive critical response.

The overall duration of the piece is listed as 22 minutes, though in her survey of 11 recordings spanning 1949–1997, Kathleen McGuire finds a difference in duration of over seven minutes, ranging from Boulez's 19:37 to Jascha Horenstein's 26:51. She notes that even in Boulez's comparatively fast recording Schoenberg's metronome marks are still not always achieved, suggesting that they are perhaps impossible to perform.
