= Edward Clark (conductor) =

English conductor and music producer

- Born: 10 May 1888; Newcastle upon Tyne, Northumberland, England
- Died: 30 April 1962 (aged 73); London, England
- Occupation: Music conductor
- Spouse(s): Dorothy Eckersley; Elisabeth Lutyens
- Children: 2

Clark (l) with Arnold Bax and Sir Henry Wood, 1934

Thomas Edward Clark (10 May 1888 – 30 April 1962) was an English conductor and music producer for the BBC. Through his positions in leading new music organizations and his wide-ranging contacts with British and European composers, he had a major impact on making contemporary classical music available to the British public for over 30 years. He was a leading figure in the BBC's Concerts of Contemporary Music between 1926 and 1939, and he played a significant role in the founding and early development of the BBC Symphony Orchestra. He held prominent positions in the International Society for Contemporary Music (ISCM) from its inception in 1922, and was its president from 1947 to 1952.

He was responsible for producing a number of important world and British premieres (some of which he also conducted), and he was associated with most of the important European and British composers, such as Arnold Schoenberg, Anton Webern, Alban Berg, Ferruccio Busoni, Igor Stravinsky, Béla Bartók, Paul Hindemith, William Walton, Arthur Bliss, Arnold Bax, Peter Warlock, John Ireland, Constant Lambert, Arthur Benjamin, Humphrey Searle, Denis ApIvor, Alan Rawsthorne, Benjamin Britten, Michael Tippett, Benjamin Frankel, Roberto Gerhard, Luigi Dallapiccola, Christian Darnton and others.

Edward Clark was described by some as Mephistophelean. He was outspoken, immensely erudite, and a visionary. But he was also a loose cannon when it came to administrative matters, tending to ruffle feathers with his too-individual approach, brooking no interference, and being distrustful of those who did not share his vision but often inadequately communicating that vision to them. In 1936 these matters contributed in large part to his premature departure from the BBC, and from the inner sanctum of the contemporary music scene, which he had helped to create as much as anyone, and more than most. His personal integrity in regard to the use of official funds also came under question more than once, in one instance leading to a public scandal and court case in which he sued Benjamin Frankel for slander.

Clark's ex-wife Dorothy Eckersley was jailed in 1945 for making anti-British broadcasts on a German radio station during World War II; their teenage son James Clark was also involved in this. His second wife was the composer Elisabeth Lutyens, with whom he had another son.

== Early life ==
Thomas Edward Clark was born in Newcastle upon Tyne on 10 May 1888. His father, James Bowness Clark (1863–1934), was a coal exporter and amateur musician who supported his son's musical interests and for two decades was the secretary of the Newcastle and Gateshead Choral Union. He and his wife Elizabeth née Thirlaway (1858–1939) had three children.

Edward Clark was educated at the Royal Grammar School, Newcastle. Studying in Paris in 1907 and 1908, he met Claude Debussy, Albert Roussel and Maurice Ravel. He returned to Newcastle and presented a paper called "Paper on a Modern French Composer: Claude Debussy"; at that time he formulated a strong desire to encourage British audiences "to understand this music of to-day before it becomes the music of the day before yesterday". In 1909 he studied conducting with Oskar Fried in Berlin while employed as the Berlin correspondent for The Musical Times.

== Meeting with Schoenberg and his circle ==
Clark's first exposure to the music of Arnold Schoenberg was at a performance of his symphonic poem Pelleas und Melisande on 31 October 1910 at a concert by the Gesellschaft der Musikfreunde in Berlin. He was profoundly impressed by this music, and he was introduced to Schoenberg and Anton Webern after the concert. He became Schoenberg's champion and, along with people like Artur Schnabel, Ferruccio Busoni, Oskar Fried and others, he convinced him to move from Vienna to Berlin, because of the greater opportunities and contacts there. From 1910 until 1912 Clark studied with Schoenberg in Berlin, the only British student he ever had. At first Clark was his sole pupil, then he was joined by Eduard Steuermann, and others later. Clark arranged for Schoenberg to give a series of ten public lectures at the Stern Conservatory ("10 Lectures on the Aesthetics of Music and the Rules of Composition"), which he also attended. He helped raise funds for Schoenberg, and played a part in having his Five Pieces for Orchestra published in a cheap edition, which sold out quickly. One of the purchasers was Sir Henry Wood.

On 3 September 1912, Wood conducted the world premiere of the Five Pieces for Orchestra at a Promenade Concert at the Queen's Hall in London. At Wood's suggestion, Clark invited Schoenberg to make his British conducting debut, and on 17 January 1914 he conducted the same work at the same venue.

Clark attended the Leipzig premiere of Gurre-Lieder in January 1914 along with Schoenberg, Webern and others. He had been considering settling permanently in Germany, and the matter was decided when he was offered a professional post in Stettin. In early August 1914 he was attending the Bayreuth Festival, on his way to take up that appointment, when World War I broke out. He was arrested at Bayreuth as an enemy alien, and interned at Ruhleben internment camp near Berlin; Edgar Bainton, his colleague from Newcastle, was also interned at that time, as were Ernest MacMillan, Arthur Benjamin and others. Clark was released in May 1918 through the offices of the Red Cross.

On his return to London, he became assistant conductor to Ernest Ansermet and Adrian Boult for Sergei Diaghilev's seasons of the Ballets Russes, and he became friendly with Diaghilev and Igor Stravinsky. In the winter and spring of 1921 he presented two series of concerts of new music, which proved very popular but made him little money. On 8 April at the Queen's Hall he presented the UK premiere of Stravinsky's 1919 Suite from The Firebird, and two world premieres: Arnold Bax's The Bard of the Dimbovitza, song cycle with orchestra, with Ethel Fenton (mezzo-soprano) and the "Storm Music" from Arthur Bliss's incidental music for The Tempest.

On 20 April 1921 Arthur Bliss's Conversations for string quartet had its world premiere at a Clark concert. On 6 May 1921 he presented Schoenberg's Chamber Symphony No. 1, Op. 9, to British audiences for the first time, at the Aeolian Hall. The players were Charles Woodhouse (violin), John Barbirolli (cello), Léon Goossens (oboe), and Aubrey Brain and Alfred Brain (horns). This was part of a series of four concerts of recent works by French, German and English composers, many of them first English performances. On 20 May 1921 he conducted the British premiere of Manuel de Falla's Nights in the Gardens of Spain, with the composer at the piano.

Clark attended the inaugural session of the International Society for Contemporary Music (ISCM) in Salzburg in 1922, and remained a significant figure in the organisation for the rest of his life.

In August 1921 he married Dorothy ("Dolly") Stephen, and their son James Royston Clark was born in 1923.

== British Broadcasting Corporation ==
Clark...should have a leading place in any history of twentieth-century British music. He knew everything that was going on in the world of contemporary music – particularly in Europe – and everybody who was engaged in it. Through him the BBC was engaged from the 1920s onwards in the hazardous enterprise of introducing to the British listener Schoenberg and Webern as well as Bartók and Stravinsky. In music it was always among the avant-garde, and Clark knew just where the avant-garde was to be found.

— Asa Briggs, The History of Broadcasting in the United Kingdom: Volume II: The Golden Age

Clark was hired by the BBC in August 1924 as Musical Director for their Newcastle station. His imagination, creativity and innovative approaches to programming were soon noted, attracting praise from local Newcastle musical circles; but so too were his administrative shortcomings. In December 1924, in Newcastle, Clark conducted the world premiere of the orchestral version of Arnold Schoenberg's Verklärte Nacht. The Newcastle station orchestra was disbanded at the end of 1926, and Clark transferred to London in January 1927 as a programme planner, at the request of Percy Pitt.

Although he was employed full-time by the BBC for only another seven years, it was primarily through his influence that the BBC became established as an international patron of new music. He also did a considerable amount of conducting during this period, sometimes of the works he was producing for the BBC, and sometimes on a freelance basis.

On 19 June 1927 he conducted the British premiere of Igor Stravinsky's Concerto for Piano and Wind Instruments, with the composer (in his British radio debut) and the Wireless Symphony Orchestra. On 10–12 July 1927 he conducted three fully staged performances of L'Histoire du soldat at the Arts Theatre Club; they were sung in English and the third performance was broadcast. Clark had also performed this work in its British premiere in the autumn of 1926 in Newcastle.

In November of that year he was able to secure Oskar Fried his first British conducting engagement (the programme included Weber, Brahms and Liszt). Clark invited Schoenberg to London to conduct the first British performance of his Gurre-Lieder on 27 January 1928, and assisted with the rehearsals. (He had tried to have the premiere the previous year, on 14 April 1927, but these plans fell through.)

In April 1929, Edward Clark along with Julian Herbage of the BBC's Music Department devised a plan for a 114-piece orchestra that was especially suited to broadcasting, and one that could be split into four different smaller groups as required. This was the original workable concept for the BBC Symphony Orchestra after some earlier ideas from Sir Thomas Beecham foundered. Beecham was the first choice for chief conductor, but he withdrew and Adrian Boult directed the orchestra for the next 20 years. Boult did not always support Clark's choices of repertoire, however. He refused to play the music of Alexander Scriabin that Clark programmed, calling it "evil music", and even issued a ban on Scriabin's music from broadcasts in the 1930s. It is also true that he had no personal sympathy with the music of the Second Viennese School, describing Alban Berg's Lyric Suite as "a Kensington drawing room apology for what Berg really meant", but Clark's influence was such that he was at least prepared to participate in performances of this music.

It was Clark who suggested to William Walton that he invite Paul Hindemith to be the soloist at the premiere of his Viola Concerto in 1929, when the dedicatee Lionel Tertis declined. Tertis also claimed to have suggested Hindemith in his place, but Walton confirmed it was Clark's idea. Walton was initially somewhat reluctant to invite Hindemith, as he felt he had modelled the concerto too closely after the latter's style, which he would quickly recognise; but thanks to Edward Clark, the invitation was sent and accepted, the premiere took place on 3 October, and the two composers became lifelong friends (they had met briefly in 1923).

Clark played an even greater role in Walton's Belshazzar's Feast: he was its progenitor. On 21 August 1929 he asked Walton for a work suitable for broadcasting, written for a small choir, soloist, and an orchestra not exceeding 15 players. Walton later thanked Clark for bringing Belshazzar's Feast to the attention of Sergei Prokofiev, who showed some interest in it.

His friend John Ireland introduced Alan Bush to Clark, who was responsible for having many of Bush's works broadcast between 1929 and 1936.

On 3 March 1930, Edward Clark played a major part in the first complete broadcast (18 poems) of Walton's Façade, at the Central Hall, Westminster, with Edith Sitwell and Constant Lambert (speakers), Leslie Heward conducting.

On 9 January 1931, Schoenberg conducted the BBC Symphony Orchestra in the British premiere of Erwartung. Clark was able to use the prestige and contacts he had by now built up to secure the ISCM Festival for London and Oxford in July 1931.

As well as Schoenberg, Clark invited Anton Webern and Alban Berg to visit England several times to conduct their own works. Berg was very reluctant, insisting he was no conductor. Clark nevertheless made sure his major works received performances in England: the Lyric Suite and Chamber Concerto (21 April 1933); the Wozzeck fragments (13 May 1932), and complete in concert performance (14 March 1934); Der Wein; the Symphonic Pieces from Lulu (20 March 1935; this was the first time Berg had ever heard this music (by radio broadcast); he was not to hear a live performance of it until 11 December in Vienna, a fortnight before his death); and, posthumously, the Violin Concerto.

Between November 1932 and January 1933, while staying in Barcelona, Schoenberg wrote a transcription for cello and orchestra of the Keyboard Concerto in D by Georg Matthias Monn. He wrote it for Pablo Casals, to whom he offered the first performance, but Casals declined. It received its first public airing on 3 February (or 5 February) 1933 in an afternoon studio broadcast from London by the BBC Symphony Orchestra under Edward Clark, with the soloist Antoni Sala. There was no announcement of this world premiere and there is no extant documentation of the broadcast. Schoenberg was probably in attendance; he was in London to conduct the BBC Symphony Orchestra's world premiere (broadcast) performance of the Variations, Op. 31.

On 1 March 1933, just four weeks after Adolf Hitler had become German Chancellor, Schoenberg resigned from his teaching post in the face of imminent dismissal for being part of what Hitler had described as "the Jewish stranglehold on Western music". He moved to Paris on 16 May, intending to remain there, but he had no luck in securing a French publisher or any conducting opportunities. He wrote to Edward Clark by postcard later that month, asking him to use his contacts to get him some performances of the Concerto for String Quartet and Orchestra, and a British publisher for that work and the Cello Concerto. He was also seeking to have his Jewish drama, written 1925–26, be published by a British Jewish publisher. Clark approached a number of people on Schoenberg's behalf, but received only knockbacks. He did, however, arrange for two concerts in November, in which Pierrot Lunaire and the Suite, Op. 29 would receive performances. But it was not to be. Schoenberg received an offer of a teaching post at a Boston music academy, and decided to quit Europe, sailing for the United States on 25 October 1933.

Clark was in Moscow in January 1934, where he conducted John Ireland's Piano Concerto in E-flat major, Sir Edward Elgar's Cockaigne (In London Town), Delius's Brigg Fair, Constant Lambert's Music for Orchestra, and a version of Walton's Façade. On 8 February 1935 he conducted the first British broadcast of Kurt Weill's Die Dreigroschenoper. It received scathing reviews from Ernest Newman and other critics. But the most savage criticism came from Weill himself, who described it privately as "the worst performance imaginable ... the whole thing was completely misunderstood". But his criticisms seem to have been for the concept of the piece as a Germanised version of The Beggar's Opera, rather than for Clark's conducting of it, of which Weill made no mention.

Also in 1935 he chose Harriet Cohen to perform new Soviet music by Dmitri Shostakovich, Dmitry Kabalevsky, Leonid Polovinkin and Georgy Kh. Mepurnov in London. The same year he was instrumental in arranging a series of BBC broadcasts, in which the émigré German composer and musicologist Ernst Hermann Meyer was engaged to present important revivals of 17th century consort music.

Clark was responsible for bringing Béla Bartók to Britain to perform his works at the Proms, such as the Piano Concerto No. 2 on 7 January 1936 under Sir Henry Wood. Through Clark's endeavours the world premiere concert performance of Schoenberg's Variations, Op. 31, took place in Vienna in 1936 under the BBC Symphony Orchestra.

Edward Clark may have suggested Benjamin Britten's name to Alberto Cavalcanti of the GPO Film Unit as a young composer he should consider for film scores. This led to Britten's score for Night Mail (1936).

Clark had planned to have the world premiere of Igor Markevitch's Cantique d'amour presented by the BBC in 1936, but perceptions about Markevitch's personal morality led to the plan being shelved, to Clark's chagrin.

Under the direction of Edward Clark and Constant Lambert, some of Bernard van Dieren's larger works were performed by the BBC in the composer's last years, and just after his death in 1936.

On 19 January 1936, Hindemith travelled to London, intending to play the British premiere of his viola concerto Der Schwanendreher, with Adrian Boult and the BBC Symphony Orchestra in Queen's Hall on 22 January. However, just before midnight on 20 January, King George V died. The concert was cancelled, but Boult and Clark still wanted Hindemith's involvement in any music that was broadcast in its place. They debated for hours what might be a suitable piece, but nothing could be found, so it was decided that Hindemith should write something new. The following day, from 11 am to 5 pm, Hindemith sat in an office made available to him by the BBC and wrote Trauermusik in homage to the late king. It, too, was written for viola and orchestra. It was performed that evening in a live broadcast from a BBC radio studio, with Boult conducting and the composer as soloist.

=== Resignation from the BBC ===
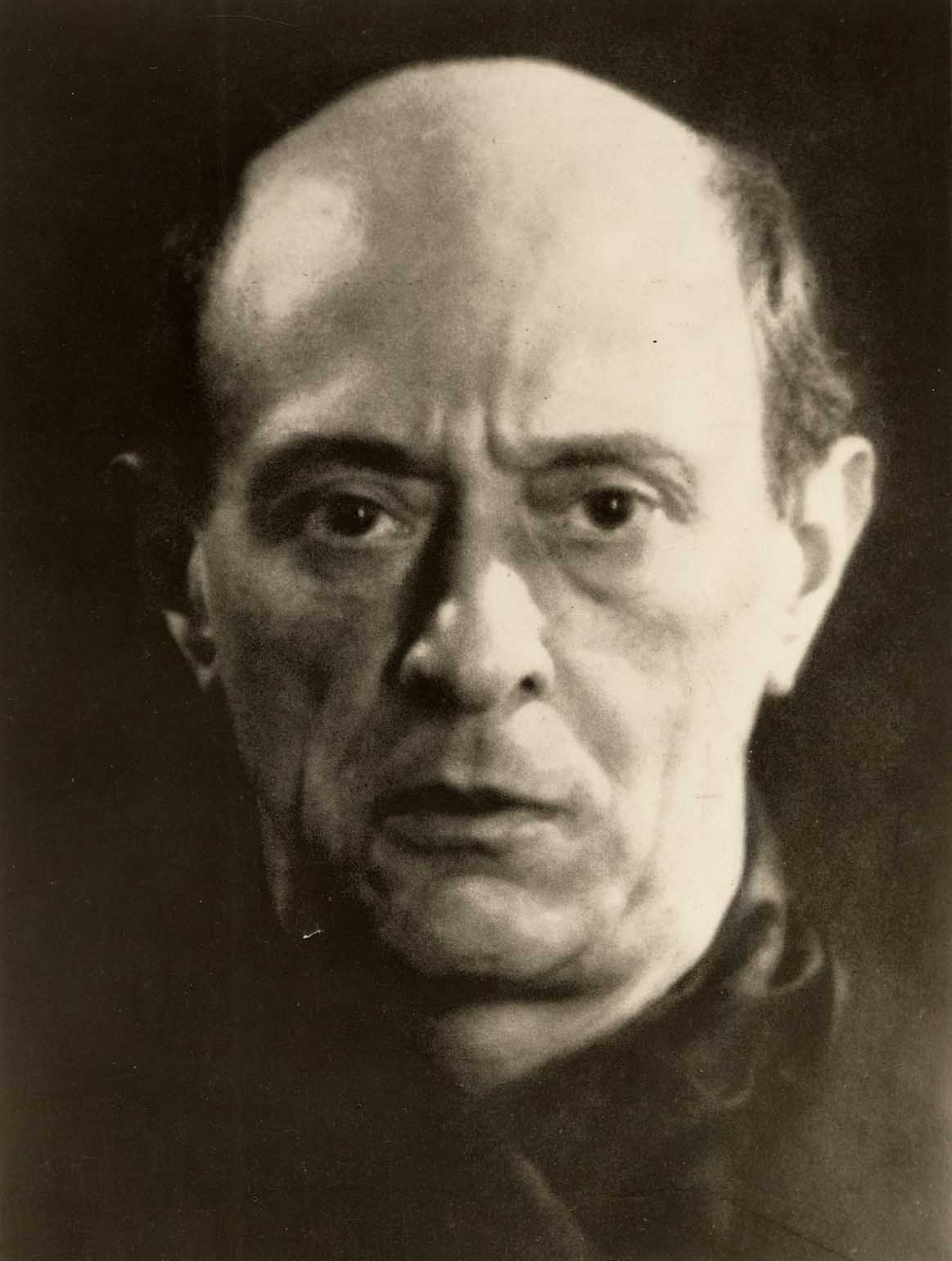
Arnold Schoenberg, 1927, by Man Ray

Clark resigned angrily and abruptly from the BBC on 16 March 1936. The immediate cause of this protest was some alterations to the concert programmes for the BBC Symphony Orchestra's forthcoming European tour, in which he had invested much time and great care. These changes were made without his knowledge and while he was on sick leave, and they included the complete removal of Béla Bartók's Four Orchestral Pieces from the Budapest programme.

However, this parting of the ways suited many people in the BBC, as it came in the wake of very strong criticism that had been building over a long time about Clark's poor work habits, his general inefficiency, his unpunctuality and missing of important deadlines, his administrative bungling and his unwillingness to communicate with his colleagues about what he was doing, thinking or planning. His dismissal had been considered more than once. His conducting was also the subject of criticism, on the basis that he could not quickly establish rapport with or give strong and unambiguous directions to his players, and he was discouraged from this activity. His personal integrity had also come under question: He took sick leave in 1928 due to severe rheumatism that necessitated having his affected arm in a sling, but while on leave he conducted orchestras in both London and Prague. Then there was a trip to Europe to negotiate with Arturo Toscanini about his involvement in the forthcoming BBC Symphony Orchestra's appearances at the Florence May Festival; Clark changed his travel arrangements at the last minute, he stayed a week longer than he was scheduled to, he still did not complete the task he was sent to do, and the rocky relationship Toscanini already had with the BBC was further soured. Adrian Boult backed Clark to the hilt, saying he had done a very good job in very difficult circumstances; but it was too late.

In 1936, Clark was invited to become Serge Koussevitzky's assistant conductor, but this did not eventuate. Clark never worked in a steady job again, although he was a consultant to the BBC on certain projects, and continued to conduct on a freelance basis for a few years until the work dried up.

== After the BBC ==
Edward Clark's departure had the effect of relegating Schoenberg, Webern, Berg and other members of the Second Viennese School to fringe composers as far as British audiences were concerned, and they were not brought back into the mainstream until William Glock's appointment in 1959. The BBC Symphony Orchestra's repertoire was similarly affected; it became more focused on the works of Romantic and post-Romantic composers for the next 25 years, leaving contemporary music to struggle for limited hearings. "Tonality had returned to the airwaves", to the relief of many.

But Clark himself remained busy with the ISCM and other activities. On 19 April 1936 he was at the ISCM Festival in Barcelona for the world premiere of Berg's Violin Concerto, played by Louis Krasner. He arranged for Krasner to come to Britain for the local premiere; in the event, it was a private studio performance on 1 May, with the BBC Symphony Orchestra. Anton Webern, who had gone to Barcelona to conduct the world premiere but withdrew at the last minute, fortunately proved up to the task on this occasion.

Clark's influence was not confined to Britain and Europe. The Australian pianist and composer Roy Agnew heard some of Clark's broadcasts while he was in Britain in the 1920s. He was part of the network of like-minded people who spread the word about emerging compositions throughout the English-speaking world. Between 1937 and 1942 Agnew broadcast his own radio programme, "Modern and Contemporary Music", for the Australian Broadcasting Commission. This was no doubt strongly influenced by Clark's programmes.

Clark produced concert versions of Ferruccio Busoni's Doktor Faust (1937) and Arlecchino (1939), many years before the British stage premiere of either work.

== Elisabeth Lutyens ==
In 1938 Edward Clark met the composer Elisabeth Lutyens. In quick succession they became lovers, she left her husband Ian Glennie, she and Clark had a child (her fourth), and they married in 1942. They spent the war years in Newcastle, where he founded the North East Regional Orchestra (NERO).

Lutyens was equally well connected with the musical establishment, and was also a friend of Igor Stravinsky. Clark's influence may have been a decisive factor in her adopting serial techniques. It is certainly the case that her first truly serial composition, the Chamber Concerto No. 1, was completed in 1939, the year after she and Clark became partners, and she dedicated it to him.

But because he was mostly unemployed now, this meant that Lutyens was the main bread winner for the family of six, and she took on certain commissions she might otherwise have declined. These included her film scores, which have received latter-day recognition as among her finest creations. She was also prepared to scrub floors to help make ends meet; but Clark would consider nothing but conducting, even though all offers dried up early. He was essentially unemployed for the last 23 years of his life. Lutyens said that she hated writing her 1972 autobiography A Goldfish Bowl, and only did so to record Clark's earlier achievements.

In 1945, William Walton was able to repay Clark's good work from the Viola Concerto premiere in 1929. Elisabeth Lutyens approached Walton for an introduction to Muir Mathieson with a view to getting some film music work. He readily agreed to pass on her name, but he went a step further. He invited Lutyens to write any work she liked, dedicate it to him and he would pay her £100 sight unseen. The work she wrote was The Pit. Clark conducted The Pit at the 1946 ISCM Festival in London, along with her Three Symphonic Preludes.

== Later life ==
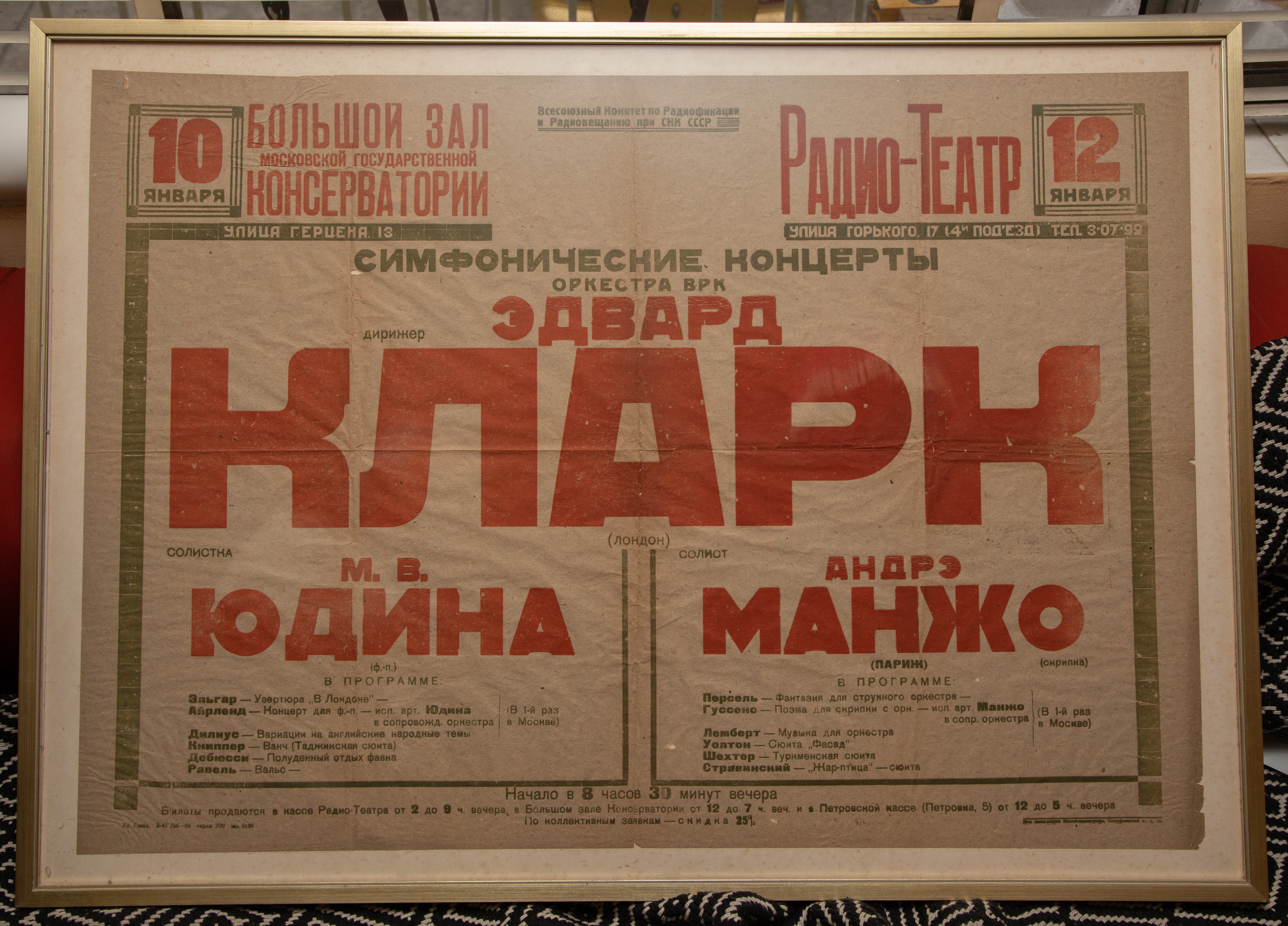
Poster for Edward Clark concert, Moscow

If not a communist, Clark was always a dedicated socialist, and he was a member of the Society for Cultural Relations with the USSR (now the Society for Co-operation in Russian and Soviet Studies, SCRSS). It was in this capacity that in March 1940 he approached firstly Clifford Curzon, who declined, and then Moura Lympany, who agreed, to be the soloist at the UK premiere of Aram Khachaturian's Piano Concerto in D-flat. The work was still in manuscript, and there was only one month in which to learn it. The concert was at the Queen's Hall on 13 April 1940, and the orchestra was conducted by Clark's friend and committed communist Alan Bush.

In 1945–46 he presented three concerts at the Wigmore Hall in London, of music by British and European composers. He organised the 1946 London ISCM Festival, a year before being elected the organisation's third President. He been active with the ISCM since its inception in 1922, as Chairman of the British Chapter. He was also associated with the London Contemporary Music Centre 1947–52 (where the Australian composer Don Banks was his secretary), and music adviser to the Institute for Contemporary Arts from its inception in 1948. Humphrey Searle became the ISCM's General Secretary with Clark's support.

In 1946 Clark attended the first performance of Denis ApIvor's Lorca songs at a concert for the Society for the Promotion of New Music. He was impressed, and included these songs in a London Contemporary Music concert at the Wigmore Hall in 1947. Later that same year, Clark produced ApIvor's Violin Sonata, Op. 9 played by Antonio Brosa and Kyla Greenbaum. It was through Clark that ApIvor became interested in serialism.

His administrative skills never improved. In 1947, Peggy Glanville-Hicks, President of the United States branch of the ISCM, was forced to write sharply to him to protest about unanswered correspondence in which the Americans had asked that the ISCM Festival scheduled for June 1948 in Amsterdam be held as late as possible in the month, in order to allow them the chance to attend, given their existing university teaching commitments. In the event, the US branch withdrew from the festival, but Glanville-Hicks attended in her personal capacity.

In 1948, for the BBC's Third Programme, Clark presented "Turning Points in Twentieth-Century Music", a series of eight programmes of his own creation, which looked at the composers Schoenberg, Stravinsky and Bartók.

He gave the Commemoration Speech before the London Opera Guild's 'Arnold Schoenberg Memorial Concert' on 16 December 1951.

In 1953 Sir William Walton used his contacts to secure a Civil List pension for Clark.

In 1955, Benjamin Frankel succeeded Clark as Chairman of the ISCM. There had been ill feeling between them since as early as 1951; and at the 1953 ISCM festival in Oslo Clark had even physically attacked Frankel after the latter expressed dissatisfaction over the selection of works to be presented. In 1955 issues arose about certain expenses Clark had claimed while he was Chairman. Clark alleged that Frankel had falsely accused him of fraud. Frankel denied he had ever made any such claim, but nevertheless said that such a claim, had he made it, would have been true. This amounted to slander as far as Clark was concerned, and he sued Frankel in the High Court. As part of the arguments, various allegations of communist sub-plots were given an airing. While Frankel's alleged slander itself was unproven, the jury exonerated Clark of any wrongdoing and he felt this meant his integrity was intact. Elisabeth Lutyens ever after referred to Frankel as "composer and ex-colleague".

In 1960 and 1961 he used his influence to have Denis ApIvor's opera Yerma broadcast by the BBC after the Sadler's Wells Theatre refused to mount the production (even though it had been commissioned by the Sadler's Wells Trust). It was conducted by Sir Eugene Goossens.

Edward Clark died suddenly of a coronary thrombosis (he had survived two earlier episodes) in London on 30 April 1962, aged 73. Stravinsky wept on hearing of Clark's death.

== Honours ==
In 1951 the Internationale Gesellschaft für Neue Musik (IGNM) awarded Edward Clark the Arnold Schoenberg Medal, "in grateful appreciation of his outstanding service to contemporary music, especially in recognition of his selfless, tireless services to the interpretation and publication of New Music in England".

Clark is one of a select band of Honorary Members of the ISCM.

== Works dedicated to Edward Clark ==
- John Ireland's Piano Sonatina (1926–27) and a number from his cycle Songs Sacred and Profane (1929).
- Alan Bush's Dance Overture for Military Band (1930).
- Józef Koffler, the first Polish twelve-tone composer, dedicated his "Variations on a Waltz by Johann Strauss", Op. 23 (1935) "À mon ami Edward Clark".
- Anton Webern's orchestration of the Ricercare from Johann Sebastian Bach's The Musical Offering
- Elisabeth Lutyens' first truly serial composition, the Chamber Concerto No. 1, was completed in 1939, the year after she and Clark became partners, and she dedicated it to him.
- Humphrey Searle wrote a musical palindrome for Clark, his Quartet for clarinet, bassoon, violin and viola, Op. 12.
- Constant Lambert's Trois pièces nègres pour les touches blanches, for piano 4-hands (1949).
- After his death, Elisabeth Lutyens dedicated Music for Orchestra II (1962) to his memory. However, it had been sketched well before Clark's death, and she denied the chorale ending was in any way a tribute to him. But she did acknowledge she had made an annotation at bars 184–185 of the score, marking the moment of Clark's death.

== Personal life ==
=== Dorothy Stephen ===
On 10 August 1921 he married Frances Dorothy ("Dolly") Stephen (18 December 1893 – 1971), who was related to the literary Stephen family (including Sir Leslie Stephen and his daughter Virginia Woolf). Clark's and Dolly's son James Royston Clark was born in 1923. Dolly left him in the summer of 1925, taking James with her.

==== The Eckersley affair ====
Dolly later went to work for the BBC as a secretary, and had an affair with Clark's colleague, the engineer Peter Eckersley. This seemed to have Clark's blessing, as on one occasion he even arranged for Eckersley to visit Germany on BBC business, and for Dolly to accompany him. Eckersley was married, but although he and Dolly made no secret of their liaison, his wife Stella was unaware. It was Muriel Reith, the wife of the BBC Director-General John Reith, who broke the news to her. John Reith was strictly puritanical about such matters (although his own private life was questionable), and he was most unwilling to have a senior staff member on the payroll who was known to be conducting an adulterous affair or in the process of divorcing his own wife. Top level conferences were held; the Archbishop of Canterbury was even consulted. However, Eckersley was not sacked immediately, as he undertook to end the affair with Dolly Clark and return to his wife. But nature took its course, he and Dolly reunited, and he resigned in April 1929. The Eckersley affair prompted a public enquiry into the BBC's personnel practices.

Edward and Dolly Clark divorced in 1930, and she and Peter Eckersley were married on 25 October 1930.

==== Dolly Eckersley's German sojourn ====
She had always been very much pro-Nazi in her politics. She was known as a strongly pro-German fascist and a fanatical admirer of Adolf Hitler. She was a friend of William Joyce ("Lord Haw-Haw") and Unity Mitford, and a member of Arnold Leese's Imperial Fascist League. Peter Eckersley himself held similar opinions. After they met Sir Oswald Mosley, he became involved in his New Party, chairing its London Central Committee. He travelled throughout Europe constantly in a quest to expand the reach of international radio broadcasts; he claimed there were no sinister political motives behind his activities, but that they were simply his attempt to make himself very rich. From November 1939 the transmitter he had arranged to put in place at Osterloog transmitting station, which became the vehicle for William Joyce's broadcasts to Britain and Europe. Joyce was later hanged for treason, and Eckersley has been described as "at best a foolish Fascist fellow traveller and at worst a traitor". As for Dolly, she joined Mosley's British Union of Fascists, but outdid Mosley in her enthusiasm for the Nazi concept of fascism. She also joined the National Socialist League, which had been founded by William Joyce after he was expelled by Mosley for being too anti-semitic.

The Eckersleys took their holidays in Germany a number of times, and attended the Nuremberg rallies in 1937 and 1938. In July 1939 Dorothy took her and Edward Clark's 16-year-old son James to a Nuremberg rally, and also attended the Salzburg Festival. She had a chance encounter with William Joyce in August and got him a job as a radio announcer and scriptwriter. When Britain declared war in September, she felt no need to return to her own country but decided to stay. James was enrolled in a German school, and gained "a very favourable impression of Germany under Nazi rule". In December 1939 she commenced work for the radio station Reichs-Rundfunk-Gesellschaft (RRG), a propaganda machine for Joseph Goebbels. She was initially employed as an English-language announcer and later on office duties. James, although only aged 16, was taken out of school to also be a newsreader there. He changed his name to Richard, to sound less Jewish and more Wagnerian. He worked there on and off until July 1942; she continued until January 1943. For obscure reasons they were arrested by the Gestapo in December 1944 and incarcerated till the end of the war. They were liberated by the British, but promptly re-arrested. They were both tried in London in October 1945 for assisting the enemy by broadcasting. Dorothy was found guilty and sentenced to one year in prison. James, still only 22, pleaded he had been hypnotised as an impressionable youth by the trappings and tricks of Nazi propaganda; this was accepted, and he was bound over for two years.

Dorothy Eckersley died in 1971. James Clark became an editor and translator and died in 2012.

=== Elisabeth Lutyens ===
In 1938 Edward Clark met the composer Elisabeth Lutyens, who was married to the baritone Ian Glennie. She and Clark quickly became lovers, and later that year she left Glennie for Clark, taking her and Glennie's three children (a son and twin daughters) with her. In 1941 Clark gave her a fourth child (a son, Conrad) before marrying her on 9 May 1942.

Their son Conrad Clark (born 1941) became a sculptor, designer and painter; he moved to Australia and now lives in Melbourne.

== Premieres conducted by Edward Clark ==
=== World premieres ===
- Arnold Bax:
  - The Bard of the Dimbovitza, song cycle with orchestra, original version, 8 April 1921, Queen's Hall, Ethel Fenton (mezzo-soprano)
- Arthur Bliss
  - The Tempest, storm music, 8 April 1921, Queen's Hall, Harriet Cohen (pianist)
  - Rout, soprano and orchestra, 6 May 1921, Aeolian Hall
- Arnold Schoenberg:
  - Verklärte Nacht, orchestral version, December 1924, Newcastle upon Tyne
  - Cello Concerto in D (transcription of Keyboard Concerto in D by Georg Matthias Monn), studio broadcast, 3 or 5 February 1933, Antoni Sala (cello), BBC Symphony Orchestra

=== British premieres ===
- Ferruccio Busoni:
  - Concertino for clarinet and small orchestra, Op. 48, BV 276, 1921
- Frederick Delius:
  - first broadcast performance of In a Summer Garden
  - first broadcast performance of North Country Sketches
  - first broadcast performance of Legende for violin and orchestra (1924; one of only 4 performances ever given to the work up till 1983)
- Manuel de Falla:
  - Nights in the Gardens of Spain, 20 May 1921, Queen's Hall, composer (piano)
- Arthur Honegger:
  - Pastorale d'été, first British broadcast performance, 11 October 1925, BBC Newcastle station
    - Clark had planned to conduct the first British concert performance on 20 April 1921, but this did not eventuate, and Eugene Goossens premiered it in the Queen's Hall on 27 October 1921
  - Chant de Joie (1923), first British broadcast performance, Newcastle station, 1 November 1926
- Arnold Schoenberg
  - Chamber Symphony No. 1, Op. 9, 6 May 1921 (or 16 April), Aeolian Hall, Charles Woodhouse (violin), John Barbirolli (cello), Léon Goossens (oboe), Aubrey Brain and Alfred Brain (horns)
- Igor Stravinsky
  - The Firebird, 1919 Suite, 8 April 1921, Queen's Hall
  - L'Histoire du soldat, Autumn 1926, Newcastle; Clark also conducted the first radio broadcast of the work, in July 1927
  - Concerto for Piano and Winds, 19 June 1927, composer, piano (in his British radio debut), Wireless Symphony Orchestra
- Kurt Weill
  - Die Dreigroschenoper, first British broadcast, 8 February 1935
- Ermanno Wolf-Ferrari:
  - Idillio-Concertino for oboe and orchestra, The Proms

== Other premieres he was associated with ==
=== World premieres ===
- Denis ApIvor:
  - Opera Yerma, two BBC broadcasts between 1960 and 1962, Sir Eugene Goossens conducting (the opera has never received a stage performance)
- Benjamin Britten:
  - Ballad of Heroes, Op. 14, for tenor, chorus and orchestra, 5 April 1939, Festival of Music and the People, Queen's Hall, Dennis Noble, London Symphony Orchestra, Constant Lambert (conductor)
- Arthur Bliss
  - Conversations for string quartet, 20 April 1921, Aeolian Hall
- Alan Bush:
  - Piano Concerto, 5 April 1939, Festival of Music and the People, Queen's Hall, composer (piano), London Symphony Orchestra, Constant Lambert
- Paul Hindemith:
  - Trauermusik, 21 January 1936, BBC broadcast, composer (viola), BBC Symphony Orchestra, Adrian Boult (conductor)
- Arnold Schoenberg:
  - Five Pieces for Orchestra, 3 September 1912, The Proms, Sir Henry Wood (conductor) (At Edward Clark's invitation, Schoenberg made his British conducting debut in the same work on 17 January 1914.)
  - Variations, Op. 31:
    - February 1933, London, BBC Symphony Orchestra, composer conducting; this radio broadcast was the world premiere public performance
    - 1936, Vienna, BBC Symphony Orchestra; world premiere concert performance
- William Walton:
  - Viola Concerto, 3 October 1929, Queen's Hall, Paul Hindemith, viola, Henry Wood Symphony Orchestra, composer conducting (Clark suggested Hindemith be engaged as soloist when the dedicatee and intended soloist Lionel Tertis declined.)
  - Façade, first complete broadcast (18 poems), 3 March 1930, Central Hall, Westminster, Edith Sitwell and Constant Lambert (speakers), Leslie Heward conducting.
  - Belshazzar's Feast, 8 October 1931, Leeds Festival, Dennis Noble (baritone), London Symphony Orchestra, Leeds Festival Chorus, Malcolm Sargent conducting (On 21 August 1929 Clark had asked Walton for a work suitable for broadcasting, written for a small choir, soloist, and an orchestra not exceeding 15 players, and Belshazzar's Feast was the result.)
- Anton Webern:
  - First Cantata, Op. 29, 1946 ISCM Festival, London, Emelie Hooke, soprano, Karl Rankl conductor

=== British premieres ===
- Denis ApIvor:
  - The Hollow Men, 1950, Redvers Llewellyn (baritone), Constant Lambert conducting, Broadcasting House
- Béla Bartók:
  - The Miraculous Mandarin
  - (possible UK premiere) Piano Concerto No. 2, 7 January 1936, composer (piano), Sir Henry Wood conducting
- Alban Berg:
  - Wozzeck fragments, 13 May 1932, studio concert, BBC Symphony Orchestra, Sir Henry Wood
  - Chamber Concerto, three movements arr. string orchestra, 21 April 1933, Rudolf Kolisch (violin), Eduard Steuermann (piano), studio concert, Anton Webern conducting
  - Lyric Suite, three movements arr. string orchestra, 21 April 1933, studio concert, Anton Webern conducting
  - Wozzeck complete, concert performance, 14 March 1934, Queen's Hall, Adrian Boult conducting
  - Lulu Symphonic Pieces, 20 March 1935, Queen's Hall, Adrian Boult conducting (this was broadcast to Europe by the BBC and Berg was able to hear it in his home in Vienna; it was the first time he had ever heard this music, and he was not to hear a live performance of the Symphonic Pieces until 11 December, a fortnight before his death)
  - Violin Concerto, 1 May 1936, studio broadcast, Louis Krasner, BBC Symphony Orchestra, Anton Webern conducting.
- Ferruccio Busoni:
  - Doktor Faust (concert performance), 17 March 1937, Queen's Hall, Dennis Noble (Faust), Parry Jones (Mephistopheles), Sir Adrian Boult (conductor); English translation prepared by Edward J. Dent
  - Arlecchino (concert performance), 1939
- Aram Khachaturian:
  - Piano Concerto in D-flat, 13 April 1940, Queen's Hall, Moura Lympany, Alan Bush (conductor)
- Ernst Krenek:
  - Durch die Nacht, three movements arr. string orchestra, 21 April 1933, studio concert, Anton Webern (conductor)
- Darius Milhaud:
  - Violin Concerto No. 1
- Arnold Schoenberg:
  - Gurre-Lieder, 27 January 1928, composer conducting.
  - Erwartung, 9 January 1931, BBC Symphony Orchestra, composer conducting
- Igor Stravinsky:
  - Perséphone, 28 November 1934, Queen's Hall, composer conducting

== Sources ==
- Forkert, Annika (2023). Elisabeth Lutyens and Edward Clark: The Orchestration of Progress in British Twentieth-Century Music. Cambridge University Press. ISBN 978-1-009-33735-9.
