= Gebr. Alexander =

German instrument manufacturer

- Industry: Musical instrument manufacturing
- Founded: 1782; 243 years ago in Mainz, Germany
- Founder: Franz Ambros Alexander
- Headquarters: Mainz, Germany
- Products: Brass instruments
- Website: gebr-alexander.de/en/

Gebrüder Alexander (Brothers Alexander), of Mainz, Germany, is a manufacturer of instruments, founded in 1782 by Franz Ambros Alexander and still in business today. The company claims to be the oldest musical instrument manufacturing company in Germany.

== History ==
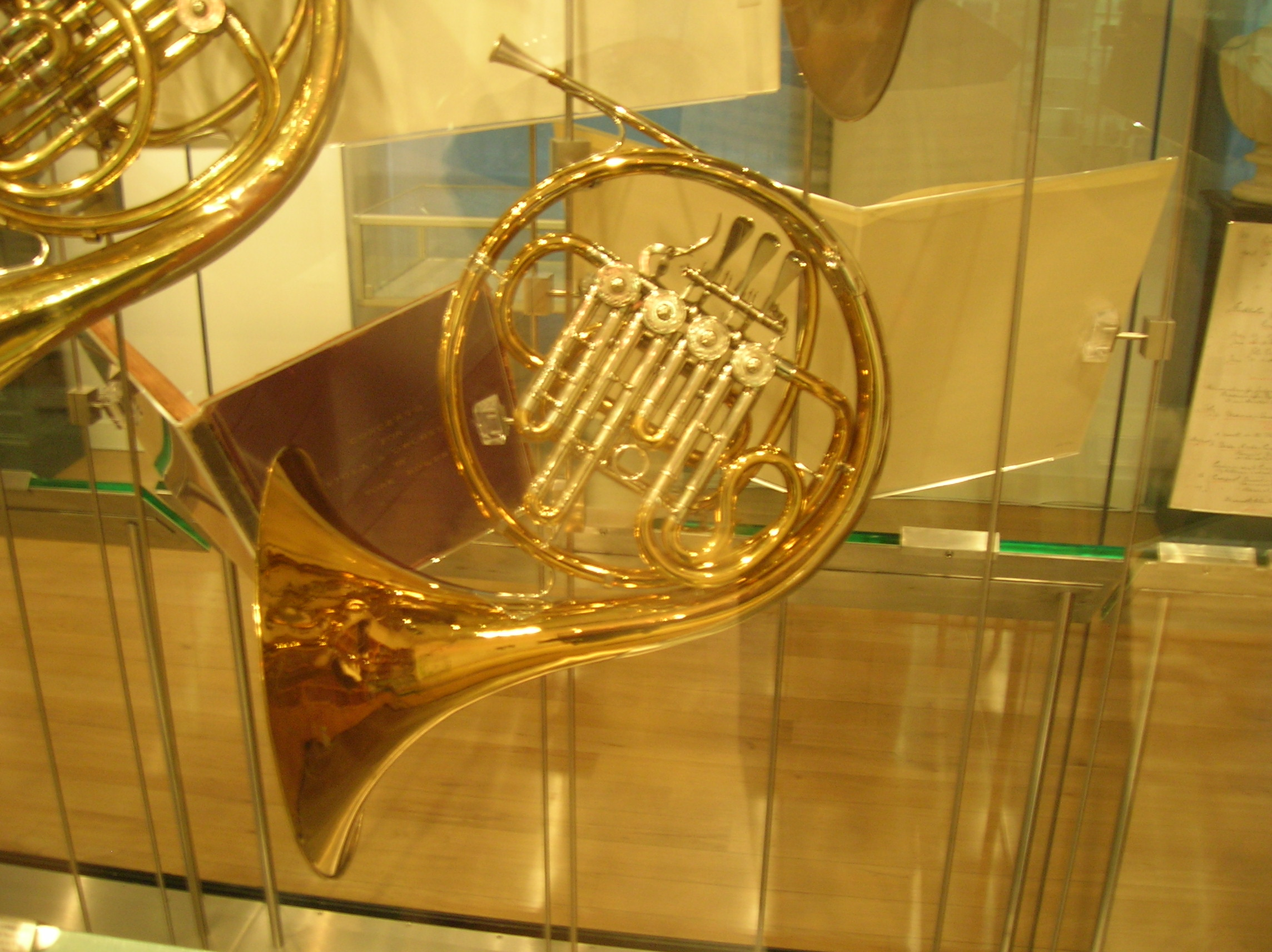
Dennis Brain's Alexander horn, repaired after the crash which killed him by Paxman of London and now housed at the Royal Academy of Music. This is probably the most celebrated horn in the world.

Franz Ambros Alexander was the descendant of a French Huguenot family and grew up in Miltenberg, which had been a village of the electoral Mainz during these times. He moved to the main town, joined the local guild and founded a workshop for brass instruments in 1782.

Today the company is renowned primarily for its horns. Its Model 103 is regarded as the standard instrument of German orchestras. They also build trumpets, bass trumpets, flugelhorns, Wagner tubas, baritone horns, euphoniums and tubas.

Alexander – or "Alex" – horns are a popular choice with professional players. Probably the best-known Alexander horn is that played by Dennis Brain in his near-legendary recordings of the Mozart horn concertos with the Philharmonia Orchestra. This instrument was badly damaged in the crash which killed Brain, but was restored by Paxman of London and is now on display, along with an Alex played by Brain's uncle Alfred Brain, in the Royal Academy of Music museum.

=== 225th anniversary ===
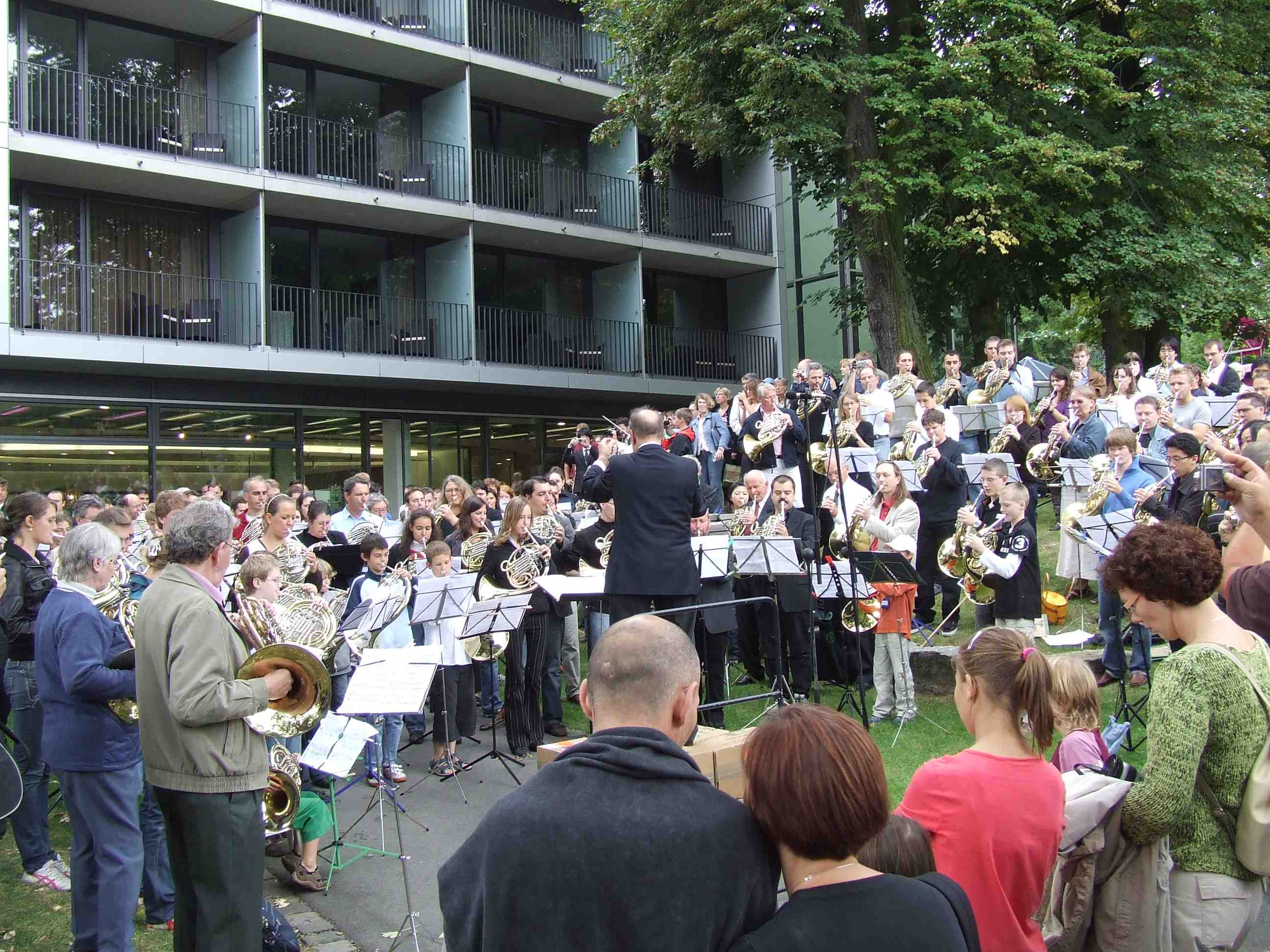
225 horn players during the world premiere on 1 September 2007

On the occasion of the 225th anniversary of Gebr. Alexander, Schott Music presented an anniversary hymn, composed by Enjott Schneider.
