= Alfred Brain =

Alfred Brain may refer to:

- Alfred Edwin Brain Sr. (1860–1929), English player of the French horn
- Alfred Edwin Brain Jr. (1885–1966), English player of the French horn
