= Tega =

Tega may refer to:

- Tega, a village in Pănătău, Buzău County, Muntenia, Romania
- Tega Brain, Australian-born digital artist and environmental engineer
- Thermal and Evolved Gas Analyzer (TEGA)
- Terra Galega (TeGa), a coalition of centrist and Galician nationalist political parties
