= Adolf Borsdorf =

German player of the French horn (1854 - 1923)

Friedrich Adolph Borsdorf 25 December 1854 – 15 April 1923), was a German player of the French horn.

Borsdorf was born in Dittmansdorf, Saxony, in 1854. He studied the French horn at Dresden Conservatoire, and played in a military band. In 1879 he moved to England, where he stayed for the rest of his life, becoming the most important horn player in England. The conductor Hans Richter offered him a job in the orchestra at Covent Garden. In 1904 he joined the newly formed London Symphony Orchestra. The four horn players in that orchestra, all excellent players, were often called "God’s Own Quartet".

Borsdorf and his colleague Franz Paersch had learned to play on wide-bore horns that were made in Germany. However, both changed to playing narrow-bore instruments made in France by Raoux. Though not quite as powerful as the German models, they produced a particularly clear sound.

Borsdorf taught at the Royal College of Music from its opening in 1882. He also taught at the Royal Academy of Music. He was playing principal horn in the orchestra which Henry Wood conducted at the very first Promenade Concert in the Queen’s Hall in 1895 (the fourth horn was A. E. Brain Sr., grandfather of Dennis Brain). He was also in the orchestra when Richard Strauss’s Till Eulenspiegel was given its first English performance in 1896, with the composer conducting.

In 1913 he became ill and had to have teeth removed. There was also another problem for him: World War I broke out in 1914 and there was a lot of anti-German feeling in England. After the war he rarely played in public.

Borsdorf died in 1923, having done more than anyone else to improve the standard of horn playing in England. He taught many talented pupils, including A. E. Brain Jr., Aubrey Brain, Frank Probyn and his own three sons, Oskar, Francis and Emil, who all became professional horn players.

The younger Borsdorfs changed their surname to Bradley because of anti-German sentiment.

- Oskar Franz Borsdorf (aka Oscar Bradley, 1889–1948) became a successful composer and conductor for CBS in America.
- Francis Bradley (1899 – ?) served in the Scots Guards during World War 1. After time playing for the Margate Municipal Orchestra in Kent and the London Symphony Orchestra, he became a founder player (2nd horn) with the BBC Symphony Orchestra in 1930, and from 1933 joined the newly-formed London Philharmonic Orchestra under Thomas Beecham. He retired from the ENO orchestra in 1976, aged 77.
- Emil Borsdorf (1903–1969) performed with the BBC Television Orchestra under Hyam Greenbaum, and later with the London Symphony Orchestra. He was also an active session musician.
