= Joseph Brain =

Joseph Brain may refer to:

- Joseph Brain (academic) (1940–2024), American physiologist and environmental health researcher
- Joseph Brain (cricketer) (1863–1914), English cricketer
