= Sam Lavigne =

Artist and educator based in New York (born 1981)

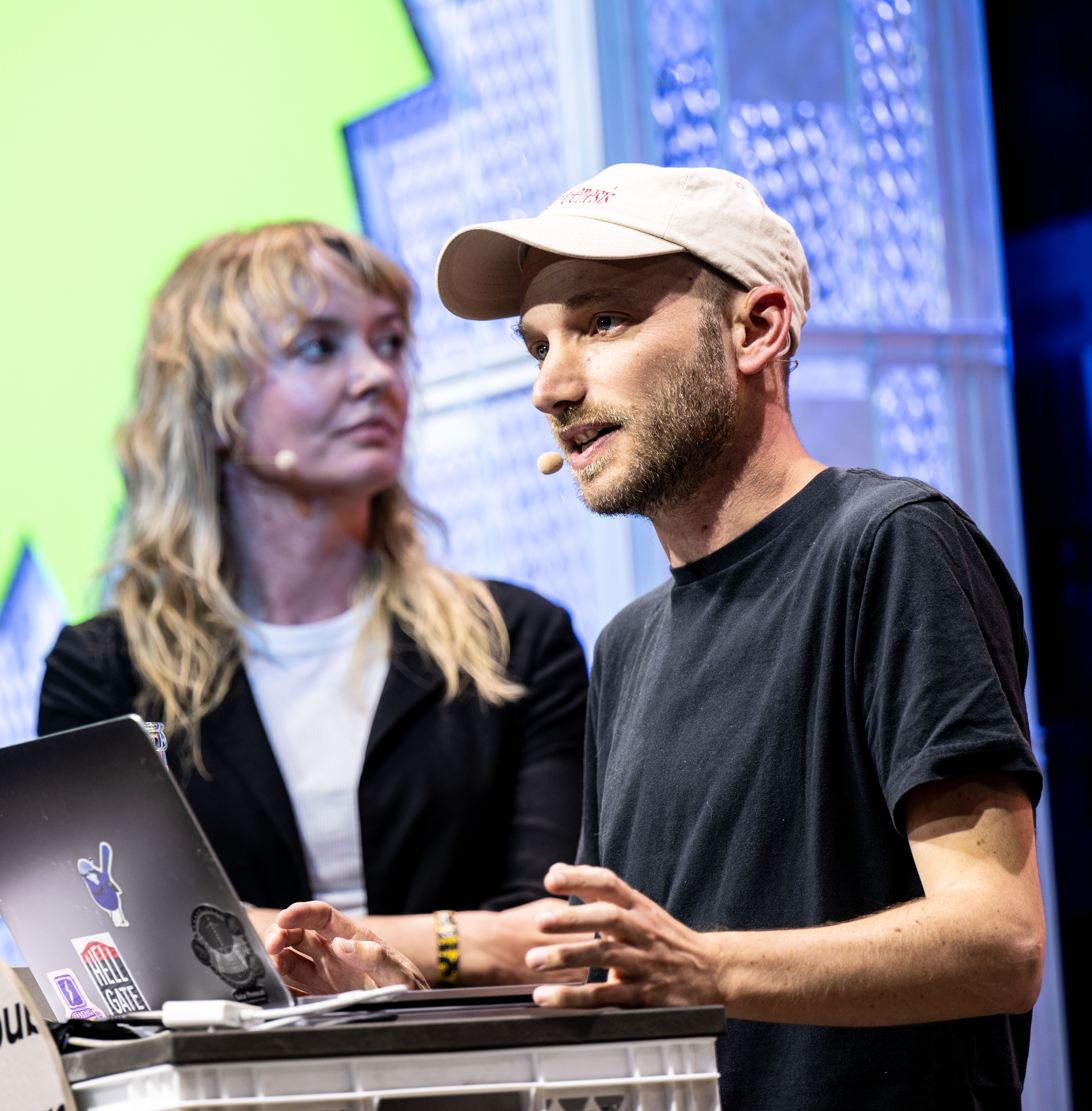
Sam Lavigne at the Re:publica conference 2023

Sam Lavigne (born 1981) is an artist and educator based in New York. His work deals with technology, data, surveillance, natural language processing, and automation.

== Education ==
Born in San Francisco, Lavigne studied Comparative Literature at the University of Chicago. He has a Master in Professional Studies at Interactive Telecommunications Program at New York University.

Lavigne has since taught at ITP/NYU, The New School, and the School for Poetic Computation, and was formerly Magic Grant fellow at the Brown Institute at Columbia University, and Special Projects editor at the New Inquiry Magazine.

He is currently an assistant professor in the Department of Design at University of Texas in Austin.

== Projects ==
Lavigne describes his work as "online interventions that surface the frequently opaque political and economic conditions that shape computational technologies".

He has exhibited work at the Whitney Museum, the Shed, Lincoln Center, SFMOMA, Pioneer Works, DIS, Ars Electronica, the New Museum.

Selected works include Smell Dating with artist Tega Brain, White Collar Crime Risk Zones, The Good Life and The Stupid Shit No One Needs and Terrible Ideas Hackathon.

He has been named an Honoree at the Webby Awards twice.

== ICE controversy ==
In 2018, Lavigne published a database of the names of nearly 1600 U.S. Immigration and Customs Enforcement (ICE) employees sourced from LinkedIn in response to the Trump administration's family separation policy. The project was removed by GitHub who claimed it violated community guidelines and information about the project removed from Twitter and Medium. This prompted WikiLeaks to post a mirror. Experts stated the project was not illegal as all information was already publicly available.
