= TheBrain Technologies =

American software company

- Type: Private
- Industry: Computer software
- Founded: 1998; 28 years ago
- Headquarters: Los Angeles, California, United States
- Website: thebrain.com

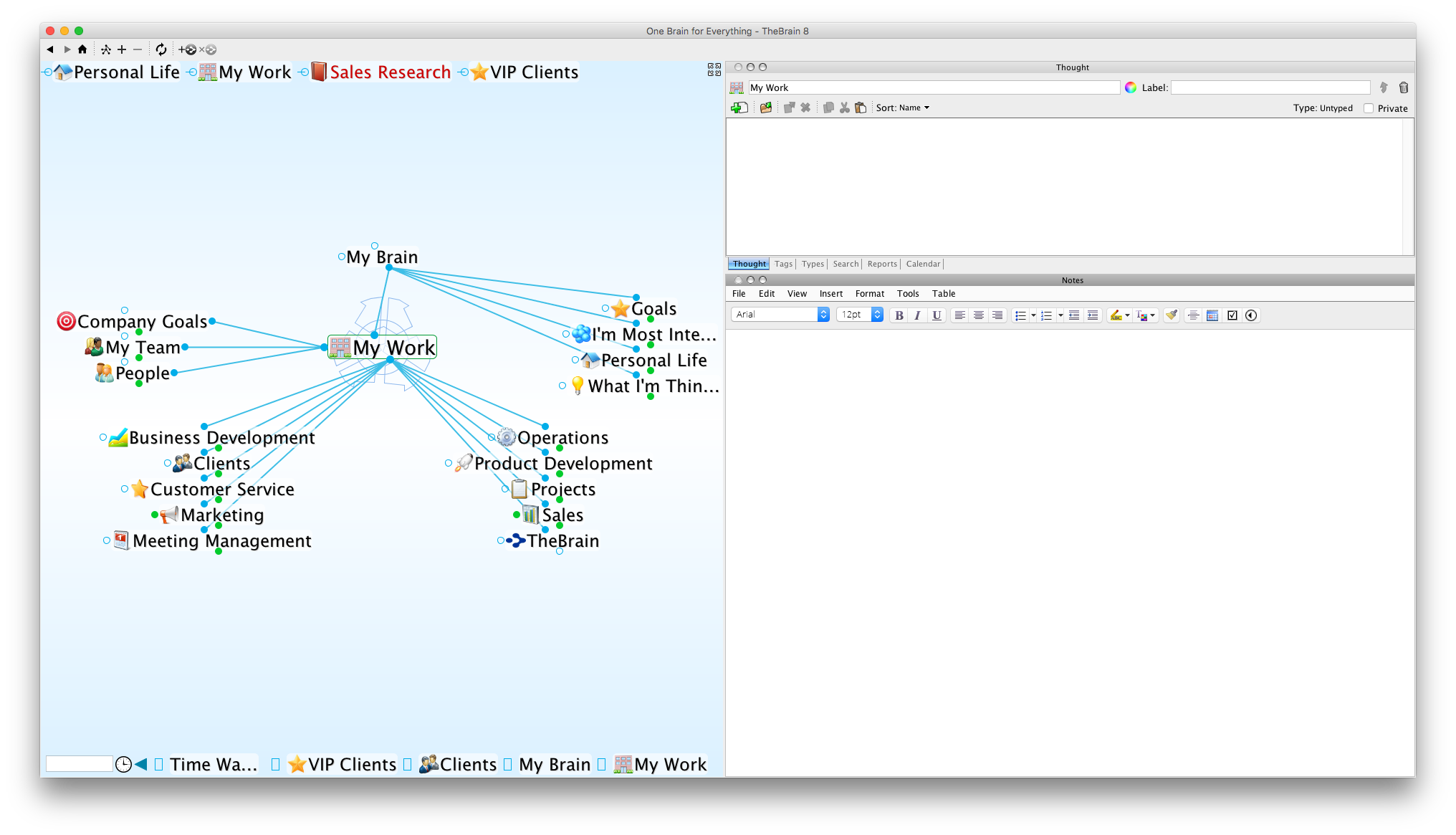
TheBrain on Mac OS X

TheBrain Technologies is a software company located in Los Angeles, California. Founded in 1998, they specialize in a knowledge graph type of mind mapping software.

== Products ==
Their flagship product, TheBrain, has been popular in mind mapping circles, and runs on multiple operating systems. Their other major product, BrainEKP, received an award from the James Burke institute in 2008. Their other products include TeamBrain, TeamBrain Server and a mobile application for iOS and Android.

== Website ==
- Official website
