= William Brain =

English cricketer and footballer

William Henry Brain (21 July 1870 – 20 November 1934) was an English first-class cricketer and footballer: a right-handed batsman and wicket-keeper who played for Gloucestershire, Oxford University and Marylebone Cricket Club (MCC) in the early 1890s; as well as keeping goal for Headington United (later Oxford United). He is notable as the first man to perform the "wicket-keeper's hat-trick" (three dismissals off consecutive deliveries) and the only man to perform a hat-trick of stumpings.

Born in Clifton, Bristol, Brain was a member of the Clifton College XI, captaining it in 1889. He went up to Oriel College, Oxford, in 1889 and made his first-class debut for Oxford University in 1891 against Lancashire, in the same year hitting his only half-century by making 65 not out (with no teammate scoring more than 13) in his only appearance for MCC, against Somerset. Playing for Gloucestershire in 1893, Brain made three stumpings from successive balls bowled by Charlie Townsend, removing Arthur Newton, George Nichols and Ted Tyler to finish off the Somerset second innings.

He played no more first-class games after that season, instead becoming involved with Glamorgan and playing a number of minor matches for that county between 1894 and 1907, including two games in the Minor Counties Championship. The second of these against Lancashire Second XI, was his last significant match; he did not keep wicket, this role being taken by his older brother Joseph. The two Brains opened the batting together in the second innings, but William was run out for a duck.

Later, Brain was instrumental in helping Glamorgan's drive for first-class status, which they eventually achieved in 1921. He died at the age of 64 in Dinas Powys, Glamorgan, Wales.

As well as the aforementioned brother Joseph, two of Brain's sons played first-class cricket. Pat made a handful of appearances for Glamorgan in the 1920s, while Michael had a single first-class outing for the same county, in 1930.

Brain was the owner of Vaendre Hall in the village of St Mellons.
