= Paxman Musical Instruments =

British horn manufacturer

Paxman Musical Instruments Ltd
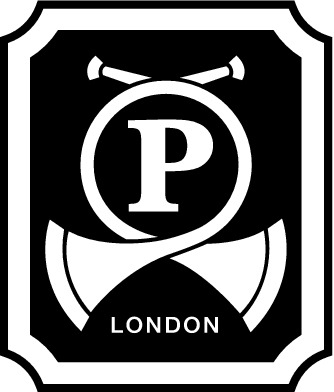
- Paxman logo
- Founded: 1919; 107 years ago (orig. Paxman Bros Ltd)
- Headquarters: London, SE1; United Kingdom
- Number of employees: 10
- Website: www.paxman.co.uk

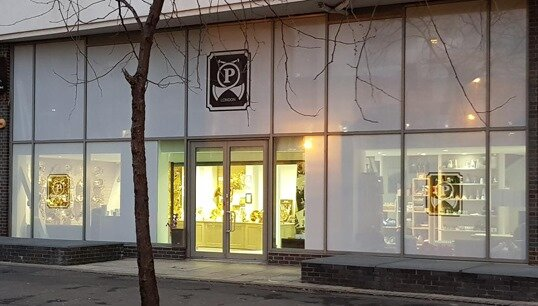
Paxman shop front

Paxman Musical Instruments Ltd is a British manufacturer of horns. Paxman is the instrument of choice of a number of leading British players, including Michael Thompson. Paxman was established at the turn of the twentieth century by Harry Paxman, but did not start production of horns until 1945, when no more than twelve instruments a year were made.

Robert Paxman was honoured with an Order of the British Empire for his services to music. 1950 saw the arrival in England of Richard Merewether, a professional horn player whose career had started with the Sydney Symphony Orchestra. As his career in England progressed, he found himself specialising more and more in the high register of the instrument. He had been working on ideas of horn design for a number of years and had researched areas of physics which he thought to be fundamental to the successful design and manufacture of such instruments. He approached Robert Paxman with these ideas, and persuaded him to build horns in f-alto and F/f-alto.

These instruments were so successful that Merewether and Paxman continued their association and went on to develop a range of over 50 models.

Paxman are also notable for having repaired Dennis Brain's Alexander horn, damaged in his fatal car crash.

== History ==
In 1919, Harry, Bertram and William Paxman together started a company supplying brass, woodwind and percussion instruments from an address in Southwark, South London. Over the following one hundred years, that company would come to specialise in the supply and manufacture of the horns which are today a mainstay of the global horn playing community.

In 1944 Paxman restructured and moved to Gerrard Street. Harry acquired the services of three retired craftsmen, some instrument assembly started and in March 1945, Harry's eldest son, Robert joined the company as an apprentice. His innovative designs were first introduced in 1959, and over a number of years the whole product range was revised and expanded, to include for the first-time, horns in Bb/f-alto, and triple horns in F/Bb/f-alto.

In 1961 Harry retired and the management team of Bob Paxman, Fred Leach, Ted Adams, Jim Paxman and Dick Merewether became directors. The company name changed from Paxman Brothers to Paxman Musical Instruments Limited and in 1972 moved to a larger site in Long Acre and acquired a small factory unit in Kent.

Around this time, Paxman introduced a number of important changes to their instruments, including the dual-bore system for full double horns and double descant horns along with triple-bore for triple horns.

In 1993 Robert Paxman was awarded the MBE by Her Majesty the Queen in recognition of fifty years’ service to the Musical Instrument Industry and in 1996, he retired, with Chris Huning becoming managing director. Since then the line has grown to include ¾ size single horns in F and Bb, a compensating double similar to the old Paxman Studenti and the detachable bell Series 4 and Series 5. This ensures that there is a horn for every player at every stage of their development.

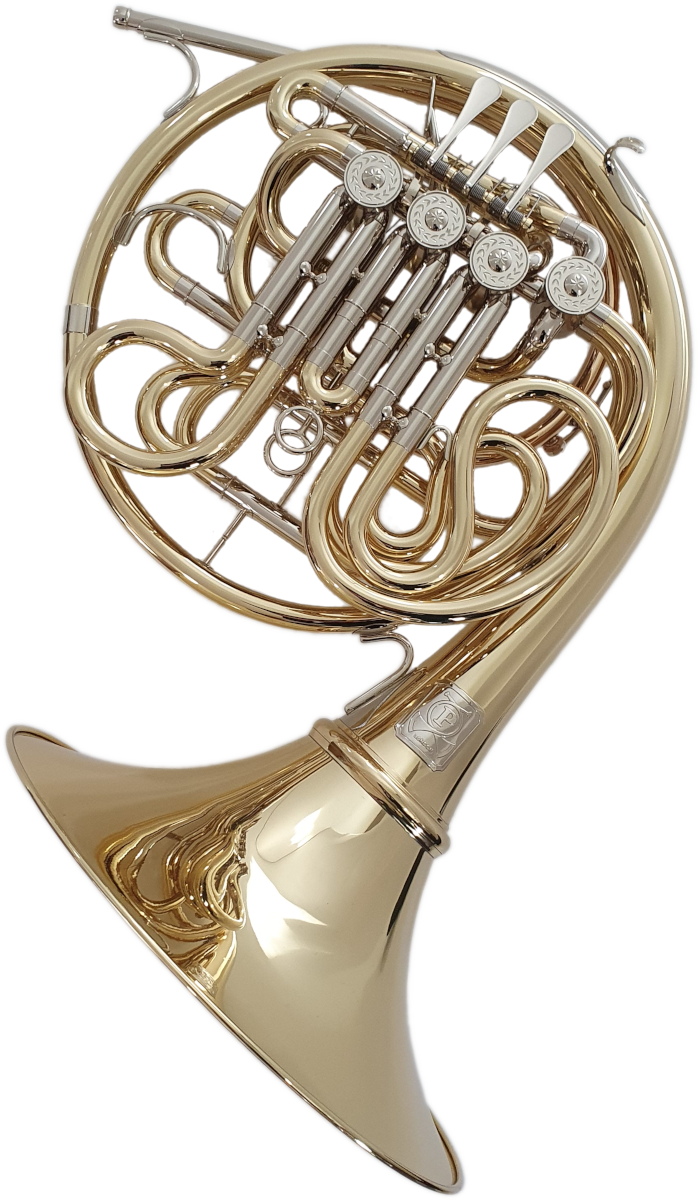

Having outgrown the Union Street premises, the company is now located at 197 Long Lane, SE1. Paxman horns are still built to the principles established during the early years of the company and whilst modern technology is used where appropriate to ensure the quality of Paxman instruments. The professional models are still assembled by hand in the workshop at the new premises, not far from where it all started 100 years ago.

== Historical timeline ==
1919 – Founding of Paxman Bros Ltd by Henry C, William & Bertram Paxman
“Grove Music”
“The Brass Bulletin 108”, Jeremy Mathez 1999
1920 -1925 - Paxman Bros Ltd listed at 16 Southwark Street SE1 and 26 Borough High Street SE1
“The New Langwill Index”, William Waterhouse 1960
“British Telecom’s Directory”, 1925
1926 – 1943 Paxman Bros Ltd moves to 156 Shaftsbury Avenue WC2
“British Telecom’s Directory”, 1926
“Post Office Ltd Trades Directory”, 1927
“British Telecom’s Directory”, 1927
“Paxman Bros Ltd Advert”, Musicians Union, 1936
1944 - 1960 Paxman Bros Ltd moves to 36 Gerrard Street
“Paxman Bros Ltd Advert”, The Musical Times, 1960
1961 – Robert Paxman becomes Director of Paxman Bros Ltd
1963 – Robert Paxman changes Paxman Bros Ltd to Paxman Musical Instruments Ltd
“Incorporation Certificate”, Companies House, 1963
1965 – Henry Charles Paxman passes away
1976 – Paxman Bros Ltd officially struck off company register
“The London Gazette”, 1976
