= Michael Brain =

Welsh cricketer

Michael Benjamin Brain
- Born: 13 April 1910
- Died: 24 August 1971 (aged 61)
- Occupation: cricketer

Michael Benjamin Brain (13 April 1910 – 24 August 1971) was a Welsh cricketer. He was a right-handed batsman and wicket-keeper who played for Glamorgan. He was born in Cyntwell, Cardiff and died in Trelleck.

Brain's cricketing career started when he played for the Repton XI in 1928 and 1929, while his club career saw him play for such teams as Cardiff and South Wales.

Brain appeared in one first-class match, during the 1930 season, against Oxford University. He scored 9 runs in the first innings of the match, but was caught out for a duck in the second innings.

Seventeen years after his only first-class appearance, he played one game for Glamorgan Second XI. Brain later became chairman of Brains Brewery between 1955 and his death in 1971. Brain's brother, Pat, father William and uncle Joseph all played first-class cricket.
