= Pat Brain =

Welsh cricketer

Personal information
- Full name: John Henry Patrick Brain
- Born: 17 March 1896; Caerau, Glamorgan, Wales
- Died: 11 December 1945 (aged 49); Dinas Powis, Glamorgan, Wales
- Batting: Right-handed
- Role: Wicket-keeper
- Relatives: William Brain (father), Michael Brain (brother), Joseph Brain (uncle)

Domestic team information
- Years: Team
- 1921–1928: Glamorgan

Career statistics
Competition	FC
Matches	7
Runs scored	86
Batting average	8.60
100s/50s	–/–
Top score	19*
Balls bowled	–
Wickets	–
Bowling average	–
5 wickets in innings	–
10 wickets in match	–
Best bowling	–
Catches/stumpings	3/2
- Source: Cricinfo, 28 June 2010

John Henry Patrick 'Pat' Brain (17 March 1896 – 11 December 1945) was a Welsh cricketer. Brain was a right-handed batsman who played primarily as a wicket-keeper. He was born at Caerau, Glamorgan.

Brain made his debut for Glamorgan in the 1920 Minor Counties Championship against Devon. He represented the county in 3 further Minor Counties fixtures in 1920. Following Glamorgan's elevation to first-class status, he represented the club in 6 matches between 1921 and 1928, making his debut against Derbyshire and playing his final first-class match for the county in 1928 against Oxford University. In his 7 first-class matches he scored 86 runs at a batting average of 8.60 and a high score of 19*. Behind the stumps he took 3 catches and made 2 stumpings.

Brain also made a single first-class appearance for a combined Oxford and Cambridge Universities team against Glamorgan in 1922 at Cardiff Arms Park.

Outside of playing cricket, Pat Brain worked for the family brewery, Brains Brewery. In the 1920s he served on Glamorgan's committee. He was also a keen hunter and owned several successful racehorses. Brain died at Dinas Powis, Glamorgan on 11 December 1945.

== Family ==
His father William, brother Michael and uncle Joseph Brain all played first-class cricket.
