= TheBrain =

Personal information management software

- Developer: TheBrain Technologies
- Stable release: 14.0.103 / November 5, 2024
- Preview release: 13
- Written in: C#
- Operating system: Cross-platform
- Website: thebrain.com

TheBrain, formerly branded PersonalBrain, is a mind mapping and personal knowledge base software application from TheBrain Technologies. It uses a dynamic graphical interface that maps hierarchical and network relationships. It includes the ability to add links to Web pages and files as well as notes and events using a built-in calendar. It is available for Windows and Mac OS X on desktop, with mobile versions for Android and iOS. It is available as a free edition as well as commercial editions with additional features.

MacLife described it as "the most compelling computer adaptation of mind mapping we've encountered".

== See also ==
- List of mind mapping software
- Encyclopædia Britannica Ultimate Reference Suite (BrainStormer tool based on TheBrain software)
