= Frank Lugard Brayne =

Indian Civil Service administrator

Frank Lugard Brayne CIE CSI MC VD (6 January 1882 – 3 April 1952) was an administrator in the Indian Civil Service (ICS) during the British Raj era. A nephew of Lord Lugard, who was zealous in his attempts to improve what he considered to be a "backward" Africa (to fight against slavery and human sacrifice), Brayne had a similar evangelical outlook and was considered to be a maverick in the ICS. He attracted the opprobrium of both his colleagues and Indian people themselves in his attempts to improve the life of villagers in the Punjab Province of India.

== Life ==
Frank Lugard Brayne was born on 6 January 1882. A son of the Reverend R. T. W. Brayne, he attended Monkton Combe School before being admitted to Pembroke College, Cambridge, where he held a scholarship and Emma Charlotte Lugard, daughter of Frederick Grueber Lugard and sister of Frederick Lugard, 1st Baron Lugard.

Brayne passed the competitive examination for appointment to the Indian Civil Service (ICS) in 1905. He was sent to the Punjab, where he worked for some time as secretary to Delhi Municipality during the period when the planning of New Delhi was underway.

During World War I, he served with the 18th Lancers of the British Indian Army, being mostly based in the Middle East. He was appointed a temporary lieutenant in June 1915, and the Kingdom of Serbia awarded him the Order of St. Sava, fifth class, in 1917.

He was awarded the Military Cross in 1919 while serving as a temporary lieutenant in Egypt. The citation for that award was:

For conspicuous gallantry and initiative. On the morning of the 20th Sept. 1918, when ordered to take the hill south-east of Nazareth, commanding the Afuleh-Nazareth road, he captured the position under heavy machine-gun fire, and by his quick appreciation of the situation he captured, in addition, 350 prisoners, and a convoy of lorries, out of which he salved £20,000 in Turkish gold.

After the war, Brayne returned to the Punjab and in 1920 he married Iris Goodeve, a daughter of Edgar Goble. He became district officer of Gurgaon, some 40 miles (64 km) from Delhi, at a time when the area, comprising a population of around 700,000, was suffering greatly from a recent influenza epidemic, a failed monsoon and the return of soldiers from the war. To counter the deprivation, Brayne initiated what became known as the Gurgaon Scheme, in which he hoped to alleviate the plight of peasants in all its aspects by encouraging and facilitating the idea of self-help. He wrote several books about this, including Village Uplift in India, Socrates in an Indian Village, Socrates Persists in India, and Socrates at School, as well as one comparing rural life in India with that of England. The scheme was not a success.

Clive Dewey argued, in his book Anglo-Indian Attitudes: The Mind of the Indian Civil Service, that Brayne's approach to rural uplift was bound to fail, because Indian peasants did not share Brayne's evangelical values – not least his belief that poverty-stricken cultivators in famine-stricken areas could revolutionise their standard of living by working harder and practising thrift, without any assistance from the state. His conclusions, which were supported by years of research in Indian archives and by extensive interviews with Brayne's contemporaries, were accepted by several members of the ICS and have been endorsed by subsequent historians. Philip Mason, himself a former member of the ICS, and the author of the most famous history of the service, described Brayne as being

a dyed-in-the-wool Evangelical, absolutely confident that he was the sole possessor of revealed truth, religious, moral, sanitary and agricultural. He thought he could persuade Punjab peasant women to behave like the wives of Victorian evangelical parsons in Norfolk. His energy was immense. Wearily, people did the silly things he told them to do until his back was turned.

More recently, Atiyab Sultan said that Brayne's interventionism had a "missionary zeal" and that his methods were "more prescriptive" than those of Malcolm Lyall Darling, who was another somewhat maverick British administrator in Punjab.

One of Brayne's sons, Thomas Lugard Brayne, became embroiled in a controversy in The Times Literary Supplement and the Telegraph following the publication of Dewey's book in 1993. He believed that Dewey had seriously misrepresented his father, unreasonably portrayed the character of the ICS itself, and misled the Brayne family, whose collection of private papers he used. In his rejoinders, Dewey pointed out that when he asked for permission to use Brayne's papers, he believed that Brayne's Gurgaon Experiment had been a success, because he only had Brayne's vainglorious accounts of his own achievements to go on; and he only lost confidence in Brayne's form of "rural reconstruction" after the overwhelming mass of evidence showed how dismally it had failed. It was impossible, he maintained, to take Brayne at his own valuation. Brayne boasted that he could 'do anything with propaganda' – and propaganda is what his work remained. At best, it raised the official awareness of the problems of the peasantry, without providing effective solutions.

By 1937, Brayne was Commissioner for Rural Reconstruction in the Punjab and in 1940 he was Financial Commissioner (Development) there. In December 1941, he was appointed as a 2nd lieutenant, having retired from the ICS to become welfare officer and then Commissioner for Resettlement of Soldiers in Punjab.

Brayne returned to England prior to Indian independence. He settled at The Glebe, a farm in Ashill, Norfolk, where he attempted to apply his theories of agriculture to an area of 45 acres (18 ha). He died on 3 April 1952 at The Glebe, at which time his military rank was stated as being Colonel. He was survived by his wife, four sons and two daughters.

== Awards ==
Aside from being awarded the Military Cross, Brayne was appointed a Companion of the Order of the Indian Empire in 1941, having been made a Companion of the Order of the Star of India in 1937. He also held the Volunteer Decoration. His wife, Iris Goodeve Brayne, had been awarded the Kaiser-i-Hind Medal in 1928.

== See also ==
- Mark Lugard Brayne
