= Mark Brain =

German DJ

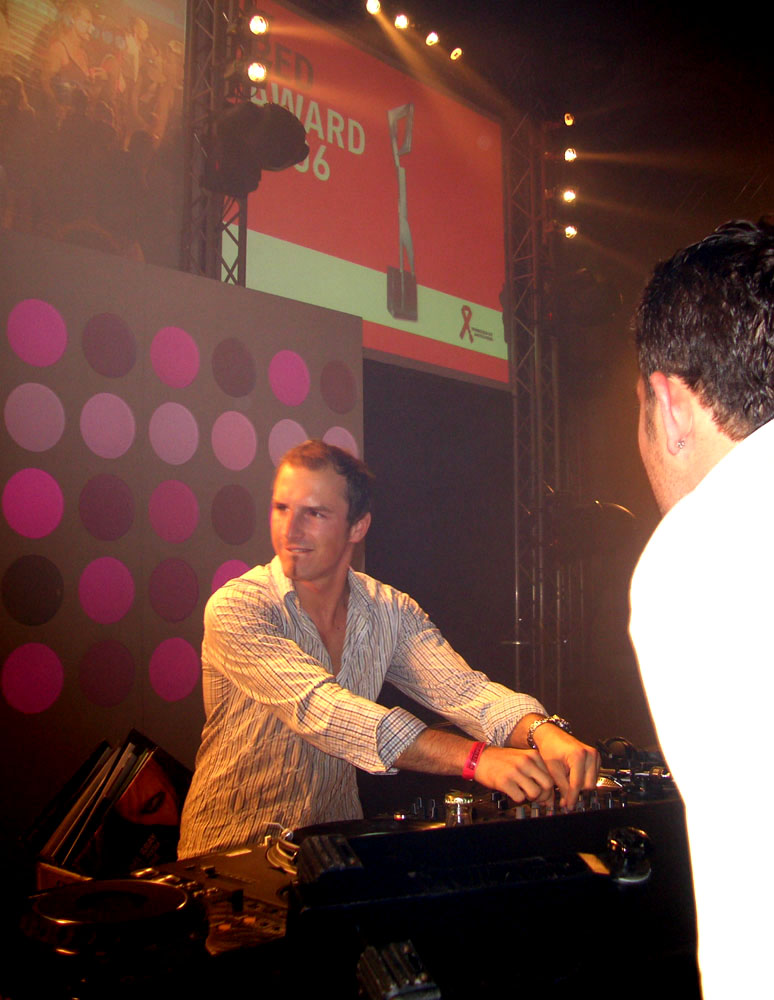
Mark Brain performing at red city hall of Berlin at the RED Award (Reminders Day) in 2006

Mark Brain, born January 30, 1978, in Paderborn, West Germany, is a DJ and producer in electronic music (House, Electro, Progressive).

== Discography ==
=== Singles ===
- 2009 - Mark Brain - Datacity (Turning Wheel Records)
- 2004 - Mark Brain - Datacity (Schallpark)
- 2004 - Brain Inc. - The Orange Theme (Schallpark)
- 2003 - Mark Brain - Ease the pressure / Los Ninos del parque (Alphabet City)
- 2003 - Brain Inc. - Running Man (Schallpark)
- 2002 - Mark Brain - Radical (Alphabet City)
- 2001 - Mark Brain - Stonehenge (Alphabet City)
- 2000 - Mark Brain & Tom Mayah - Basepower (4 the music)
- 2000 - Mark Brain & Tom Mayah - Step Tech
- 2000 - Mark Brain & Tom Mayah - Union Crowd Theme

=== Remixes ===
- 2001 - Powell - I am ready (Mark Brain Remix)
- 2001 - Badlands - Let them know (Mark Brain & Tom Mayah Remix)
- 2000 - The Groove Town Gang - Ain't no mountain high enough (Mark Brain & Tom Mayah Clubbin' Mix)
