= Horrie Brain =

Australian rules footballer

Personal information
- Full name: Horace Horton Brain
- Born: 17 November 1885; Colebrook, Tasmania
- Died: 22 March 1966 (aged 80); Mount Nelson, Tasmania
- Original team: North Hobart

Playing career^{1}
Years	Club	Games (Goals)
1904–05	North Hobart	
1906	Brisbane (QFL)	
1907	St Kilda	11 (0)
1909–13	North Hobart	
- ^{1} Playing statistics correct to the end of 1907.

Horace Horton Brain (17 November 1885 – 22 March 1966) was an Australian rules footballer who played with St Kilda in the Victorian Football League (VFL).

He later served in World War I, serving mainly in France and suffering mustard gas poisoning in 1917.
