= Ray Brain =

Australian rules footballer (1952–2019)

Personal information
- Full name: Raymond Victor Brain
- Born: 21 November 1952
- Died: 28 September 2019 (aged 66)
- Original team: North Reservoir
- Height: 183 cm (6 ft 0 in)
- Weight: 85 kg (187 lb)

Playing career^{1}
Years	Club	Games (Goals)
1972–1974	Fitzroy	13 (1)
- ^{1} Playing statistics correct to the end of 1974.

Raymond Victor Brain (21 November 1952 – 28 September 2019) was an Australian rules footballer, who played for the Fitzroy Football Club in the Victorian Football League (VFL).
