= Mark Brayne =

American psychotherapist and former journalist

Mark Lugard Brayne (born 17 April 1950) is a British psychotherapist and former journalist. After a first career as a foreign correspondent, he qualified in psychotherapy and since 2002 has specialised in working with trauma.

As a therapist, he is an accredited Consultant in Eye Movement Desensitisation and Reprocessing (EMDR).

== Early life ==
The son of Thomas Lugard Brayne (who died in 2009) by his marriage to Audrey Diana Thompson, Brayne was educated at Gresham's School, Wymondham College and the University of Leeds, where he graduated in 1973 with a First Class Honours BA in German and Russian.

== Career ==
Brayne was with Reuters News Agency from 1973 to 1978, serving as correspondent in Moscow and East Berlin. In 1978 he joined the BBC, first as its German service correspondent in Berlin for two years, then as Central European correspondent based in Vienna. From 1984 to 1987 he was BBC Radio News correspondent in Beijing, then from 1988 to 1992 was BBC World Service Diplomatic Correspondent based in London. In 1992 he became Deputy Head of the BBC Central European Service and in 1993 Deputy Head of the Russian service. From 1994 to 2003 he was the BBC's Regional Editor, Europe.

In the 1990s Brayne retrained as a psychotherapist and in 2000 graduated with a Master of Arts degree in transpersonal counselling and psychotherapy at the CCPE (Centre for Counselling and Psychotherapy) in London.

In 2002 Brayne set up the BBC's project for Journalism and Trauma, and in the same year concurrently became Director Europe for the Dart Centre for Journalism and Trauma.

In 2003, Brayne left the BBC to work in private psychotherapy practice and as Director (Europe) for the Dart Centre. Between 2004 and 2008, when he left the Dart Centre, he was a member of the board of the European Society for Traumatic Stress Studies (ESTSS).

From 2014 to 2015, Brayne served on the board of the EMDR Association UK & Ireland. Brayne and his wife Jutta are joint Directors of their advanced EMDR training company EMDRFocus Ltd and both work as EMDR Consultants online from their home in Sheringham, Norfolk, UK.

== Publications ==
- 'Luther: One of the Greatest Sons of the German People' in GDR Monitor (Dundee, 1980)
- 'Filming the PLA' in Bulletin of the British Association for Chinese Studies (London, September 1989)
- 'The Problem of Distance' in Robin Porter, ed., Reporting the News from China (Royal Institute for International Affairs, 1992)
- 'Journalism and Peace: the Personal Perspective of One Journalist' in Guide to UN Peace Exhibition (Geneva, 2003)
- 'Tackling the Macho Culture: Trauma and Journalists' in Counselling at Work, autumn 2004
- 'Emotions, Trauma and Good Journalism' in International News in the 21st Century (John Libbey/University of Luton Press, 2004)
- 'Media Workers and the Duty of Care' in Counselling at Work, summer 2006
- The Dart Centre and the Reporting of Trauma (Wildwasser Berlin, 2006)
- 'Early Psychosocial Intervention Following Traumatic Events' (with Bisson, Ochberg, & Everly) in American Journal of Psychiatry, July 2007
- 'Tackling the Macho Culture' in International Journalism (Wiley, 2007)
- 'Climate Change and the Therapist' in Therapy Today, December 2007
- 'Emotions, Trauma and Good Journalism' in International News Reporting – Frontlines and Deadlines (Owen & Purdey, Wiley, 2008)
- 'Journalism and Trauma Support' in Employee Wellbeing Support; A Workplace Resource (Wiley, 2008)
- 'Journalists’ and Media professionals’ attitudes to PTSD and help-seeking: a descriptive study' (with Greenberg, Gould, & Langston), in Journal of Mental Health (Informa Healthcare, 2009)

== See also ==
- Frank Lugard Brayne
