= Roy Brain =

Australian cricketer

Personal information
- Born: 2 September 1926; Hobart, Tasmania, Australia
- Died: 7 June 2006 (aged 79); Hobart, Tasmania, Australia

Domestic team information
- Years: Team
- 1958-1959: Tasmania
- Source: Cricinfo, 11 March 2016

Roy Brain (2 September 1926 – 7 June 2006) was an Australian cricketer. He played two first-class matches for Tasmania between 1958 and 1959.

== See also ==
- List of Tasmanian representative cricketers
