= Carol Brayne =

British academic

Dame Carol Elspeth Goodeve Brayne DBE is a British epidemiologist, academic, physician and medical researcher. She is Professor Emeritus and Senior Visiting Fellow in the Department of Psychiatry at University of Cambridge.

== Early life, family and education ==
Brayne received a degree in medicine from the Royal Free Hospital School of Medicine, University of London, in 1981. She subsequently earned a masters of science in epidemiology.

== Career ==
Brayne was the Professor of Public Health Medicine at the University of Cambridge from 2001 to 2024. She joined Cambridge in 1985. She has been Chair of Wellcome's Population and Public Health Review Group. She was Director of the Cambridge Institute of Public Health. She has been a special advisor for the Royal College of Physicians and a senior investigator at the National Institute for Health Research (NIHR).

Brayne has worked for the National Health Service. She also spent six months as a visiting fellow in Australia in 1997.

== Honours and awards ==
Brayne was elected a Fellow of the Academy of Medical Sciences in 2014. In the 2017 Birthday Honours, she was appointed CBE, "[f]or services to Public Health Medicine".

== Personal life ==
Brayne and her husband have raised four children.

== Selected publications ==
- Wharton SB, Simpson JE, Brayne C, et al. (January 2015). "Age-Associated White Matter Lesions: The MRC Cognitive Function and Ageing Study". Brain Pathol. 25 (1): 35–43. doi:10.1111/bpa.12219. PMC 8029351. PMID 25521175.
- Norton S, Matthews FE, Barnes DE, et al. (August 2014). "Potential for primary prevention of Alzheimer's disease: an analysis of population-based data" (PDF). Lancet Neurol. 13 (8): 788–94. doi:10.1016/S1474-4422(14)70136-X. PMID 25030513.
- D'Alton S, Hunter S, Whitehouse P, et al. (2014). "Adapting to dementia in society: a challenge for our lifetimes and a charge for public health". J Alzheimers Dis. 42 (4): 1151–63. doi:10.3233/JAD-140213. PMID 25024316.
- Stephan BC, Minett T, Muniz Terrera G, et al. (January 2015). "Dementia prediction for people with stroke in populations: is mild cognitive impairment a useful concept?". Age Ageing. 44 (1): 78–83. doi:10.1093/ageing/afu085. PMC 4255614. PMID 25002454.
- Noel-Storr AH, McCleery JM, Richard E, et al. (July 2014). "Reporting standards for studies of diagnostic test accuracy in dementia: The STARDdem Initiative". Neurology. 83 (4): 364–73. doi:10.1212/WNL.0000000000000621. PMC 4115600. PMID 24944261.
- Escott-Price V, Bellenguez C, Wang LS, et al. (12 June 2014). "Gene-wide analysis detects two new susceptibility genes for Alzheimer's disease". PLOS ONE. 9 (6) e94661. Bibcode:2014PLoSO...994661E. doi:10.1371/journal.pone.0094661. PMC 4055488. PMID 24922517.
- Garwood CJ, Simpson JE, Al Mashhadi S, et al. (December 2014). "DNA damage response and senescence in endothelial cells of human cerebral cortex and relation to Alzheimer's neuropathology progression: a population-based study in the Medical Research Council Cognitive Function and Ageing Study (MRC-CFAS) cohort". Neuropathol Appl Neurobiol. 40 (7): 802–14. doi:10.1111/nan.12156. PMID 24861546.
- Janaway BM, Simpson JE, Hoggard N, et al. (April 2014). "Brain haemosiderin in older people: pathological evidence for an ischaemic origin of magnetic resonance imaging (MRI) microbleeds". Neuropathol Appl Neurobiol. 40 (3): 258–69. doi:10.1111/nan.12062. PMC 4282337. PMID 23678850.
- Wimo A, Ballard C, Brayne C, et al. (March 2014). "Health economic evaluation of treatments for Alzheimer's disease: impact of new diagnostic criteria". J Intern Med. 275 (3): 304–16. doi:10.1111/joim.12167. PMID 24605810.
- Perales J, Cosco TD, Stephan BC, et al. (February 2014). "Health-related quality of life in the Cambridge City over-75s Cohort (CC75C): development of a dementia-specific scale and descriptive analyses". BMC Geriatr. 10 (14) 18. doi:10.1186/1471-2318-14-18. PMC 3922243. PMID 24512291.
- Lima TA, Adler AL, Minett T, et al. (March 2014). "C-reactive protein, APOE genotype and longitudinal cognitive change in an older population". Age Ageing. 43 (2): 289–92. doi:10.1093/ageing/aft193. PMC 3927773. PMID 24305621.
- Liu G, Yao L, Liu J, et al. (April 2014). "Cardiovascular disease contributes to Alzheimer's disease: evidence from large-scale genome-wide association studies". Neurobiology of Aging. 35 (4): 786–92. doi:10.1016/j.neurobiolaging.2013.10.084. PMID 24231519.
- Sachdev PS, Lipnicki DM, Kochan NA, et al. (November 2013). "COSMIC (Cohort Studies of Memory in an International Consortium): an international consortium to identify risk and protective factors and biomarkers of cognitive ageing and dementia in diverse ethnic and sociocultural groups". BMC Neurol. 6 (13) 165. doi:10.1186/1471-2377-13-165. PMC 3827845. PMID 24195705.
- Lambert JC, Ibrahim-Verbaas CA, Harold D, et al. (December 2013). "Meta-analysis of 74,046 individuals identifies 11 new susceptibility loci for Alzheimer's disease". Nat Genet. 45 (12): 1452–8. doi:10.1038/ng.2802. PMC 3896259. PMID 24162737.
- Wardlaw JM, Smith EE, Biessels GJ, et al. (August 2013). "Neuroimaging standards for research into small vessel disease and its contribution to ageing and neurodegeneration". Lancet Neurol. 12 (8): 822–38. doi:10.1016/S1474-4422(13)70124-8. PMC 3714437. PMID 23867200.
