= Jack Brain =

Australian rules footballer

Personal information
- Full name: Jack Brain
- Born: 20 June 1920; Trafalgar, Victoria
- Died: 25 January 2014 (aged 93)
- Height: 169 cm (5 ft 7 in)
- Weight: 63 kg (139 lb)

Playing career^{1}
Years	Club	Games (Goals)
1941–42, 1946–48	Hawthorn	58 (25)
- ^{1} Playing statistics correct to the end of 1948.

Jack Brain (20 June 1920 – 25 January 2014) was a former Australian rules footballer who played with Hawthorn in the Victorian Football League (VFL).

== Personal life ==
Brain served as a signalman in the Australian Army during the Second World War.
