= Raoux =

Raoux is a French surname. Notable people with the surname include:

- Guillaume Raoux (born 1970), French tennis player
- Jean Raoux (1677–1734), French painter
- Jean Raoux (soldier) (1916–2004), French général de brigade
