= Desmond Brain =

Tasmanian cricketer

Personal information
- Born: 16 December 1909; Hobart, Tasmania, Australia
- Died: 1 March 1990 (aged 80); Tumut, New South Wales

Domestic team information
- Years: Team
- 1930/31: Tasmania
- Source: Cricinfo, 4 March 2016

Desmond Morrah Brain (16 December 1909 – 1 March 1990) played first-class cricket for Tasmania in three matches in 1930–31. He was born at Hobart, Tasmania and died at Tumut, New South Wales.

== See also ==
- List of Tasmanian representative cricketers
