= Terry Brain Jr. =

Australian rules footballer

Terry Brain

Personal information
- Full name: Terry Brain
- Born: 31 December 1938 (age 87)
- Original team: Glen Iris
- Height: 175 cm (5 ft 9 in)
- Weight: 72 kg (159 lb)

Playing career^{1}
Years	Club	Games (Goals)
1958, 1960–61	South Melbourne	7 (4)
- ^{1} Playing statistics correct to the end of 1961.

Terry Brain (born 31 December 1938) is a former Australian rules footballer who played with South Melbourne in the Victorian Football League (VFL).
