= Aubrey Brain =

British horn player

Aubrey Brain (12 July 1893 – 21 September 1955) was a British horn player and teacher. He was the father of Dennis Brain.

== Biography ==
Aubrey Harold Brain was born in London in 1893. He came from a musical family. His father, Alfred Edwin Brain Sr. was a member of the London Symphony Orchestra (LSO) horn quartet. His brother Alfred was for many years the principal horn player in the Queen's Hall Orchestra under Sir Henry Wood. He went to the United States to join the Damrosch Orchestra in 1923, and remained permanently, becoming an American citizen.

In 1911 Aubrey Brain won a scholarship to the Royal College of Music. He was appointed principal horn of the New Symphony Orchestra that same year, and in 1912 he went on the LSO's tour of the United States under Arthur Nikisch. He was principal horn of Thomas Beecham's opera company orchestra in 1913.

In 1923 he succeeded his teacher, Adolf Borsdorf, as professor of horn at the Royal Academy of Music, where his son Dennis was among his students.

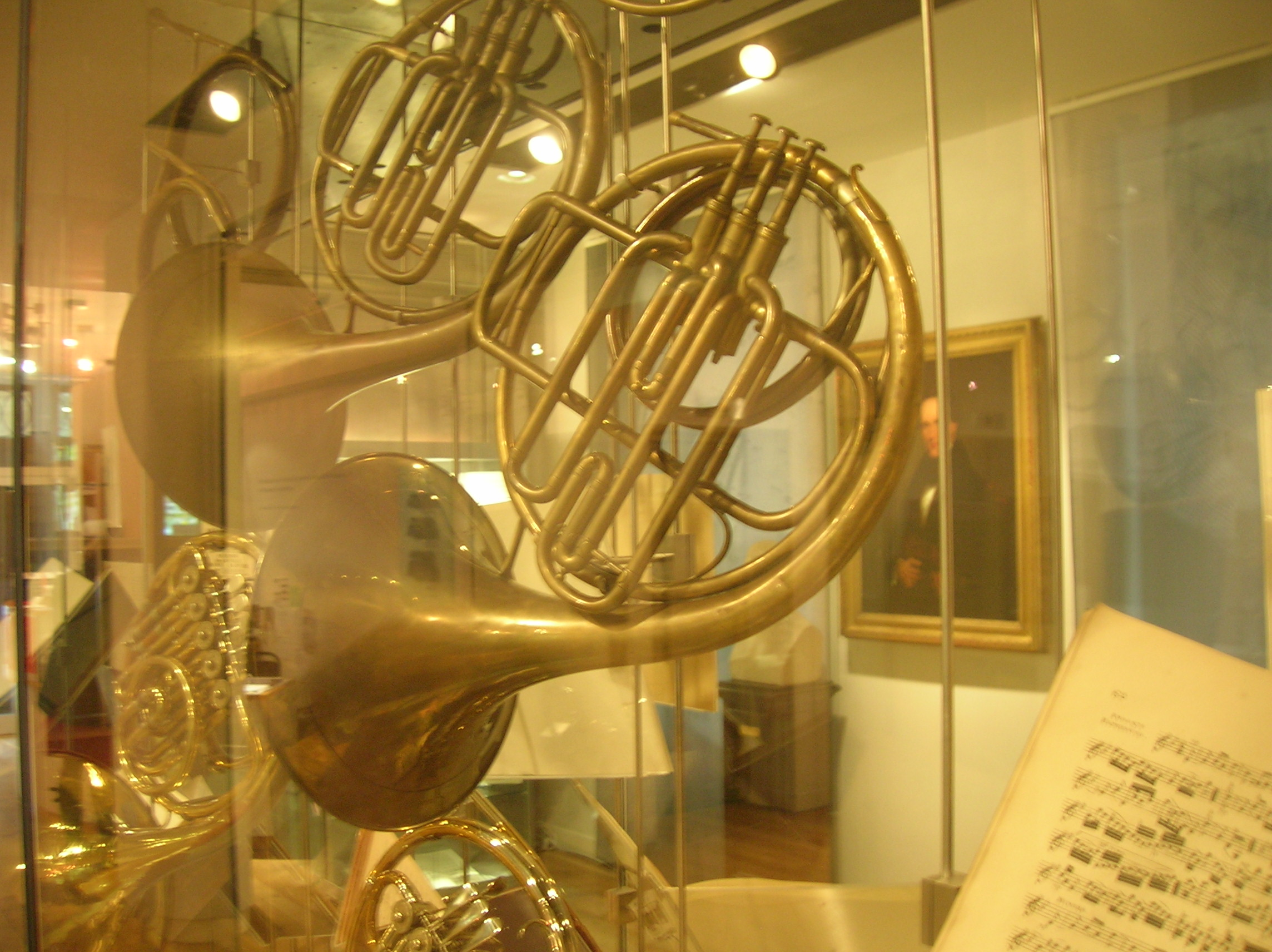
Aubrey Brain's Raoux piston-valve horn on display at the Royal Academy of Music.

Dame Ethel Smyth wrote her Concerto for Violin, Horn and Orchestra with Aubrey Brain in mind. He and Jelly d'Arányi premiered the work under Sir Henry Wood on 5 March 1927. He also played it in Berlin with Marjorie Hayward. He joined the BBC Symphony Orchestra as principal horn, and remained there until illness caused his premature retirement in 1943. He was often a soloist, and made a number of recordings.

He had a marked preference for French instruments, and played a hand horn made by Labbaye in c. 1865, to which English-made valves had been added. He would never permit the use of large-bore German horns in the BBC SO.

He married Marion Beeley, a singer at Covent Garden. His two sons were Dennis Brain, even more famous as a horn player, and Leonard Brain, an oboist.

== Discography ==
One recording by Aubrey Brain has been made available by the British classical record company Testament:

- SBT 1001 Johannes Brahms, Horn Trio in E flat major, Op. 40. With Adolf Busch, violin, and Rudolf Serkin, piano. Recorded on 13 November 1933, at the Abbey Road Studios, London, and originally published on 78 RPM shellac as DB.2105/8. Further included on the CD is Brahms' Clarinet Quintet, played by Reginald Kell, clarinet, and the Busch Quartet (recorded on 10 October 1937).
