= Tega Brain =

Australian-born digital artist and environmental engineer

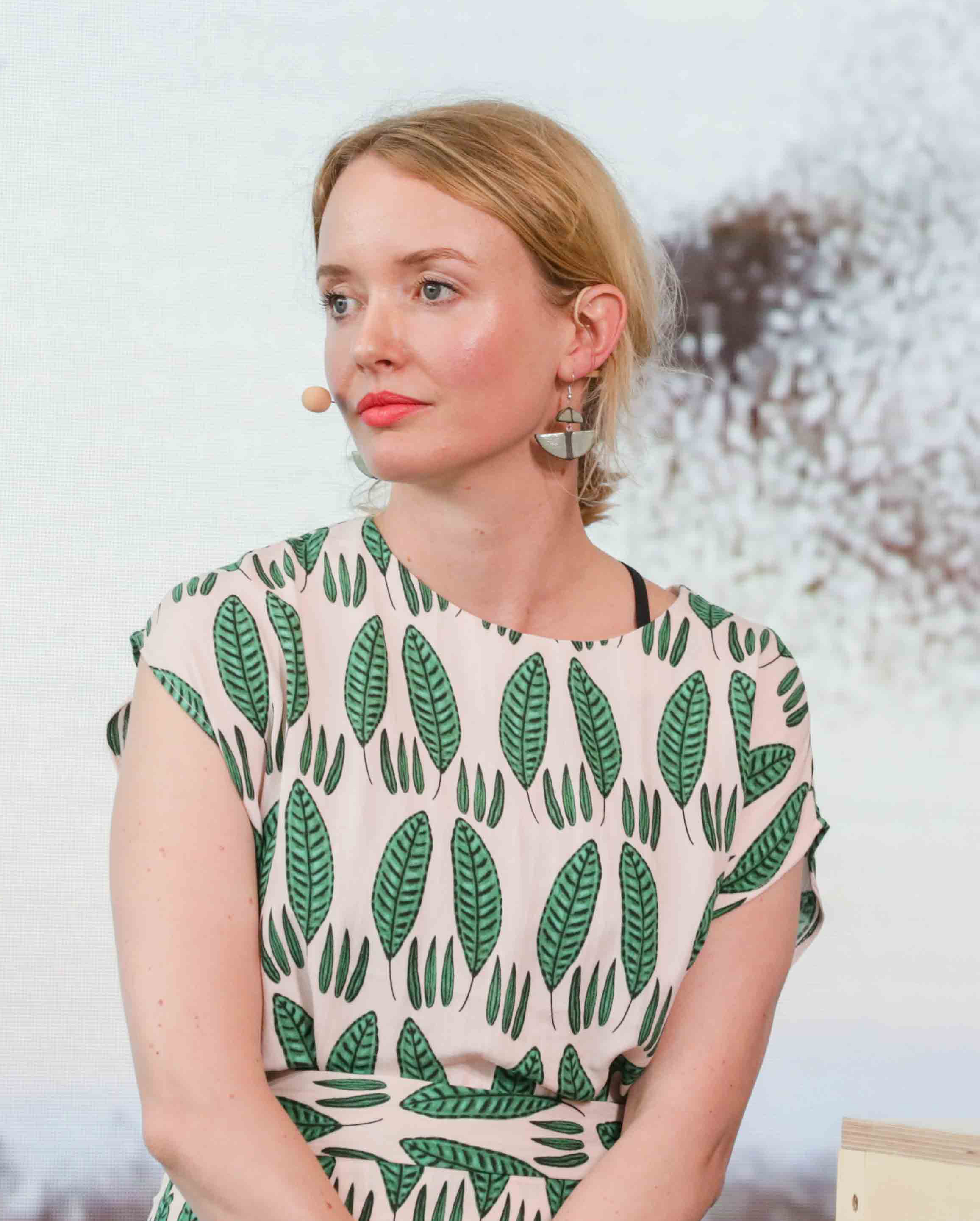
- Occupations: Engineer and artist

Tega Brain is an Australian-born digital artist and environmental engineer who is also an assistant professor of Integrated Digital Media at New York University (NYU). Brain is known for her eccentric and often purposefully dysfunctional information systems that examine the intersection between digital networks and natural phenomena. Her art works have been discussed widely in press outlets such as The New York Times, The Atlantic, Artforum, NPR and The Guardian. Brain's works have been exhibited in multiple museums such as the Whitney Museum of American Art and the Haus der Kulturen der Welt in Berlin. In 2021, Brain co-authored the textbook Code as Creative Medium which serves as a guide for educators and computer scientists about teaching and learning computational art and design.

== Education ==
Brain received a Bachelor of Environmental Engineering and a Bachelor of Arts at University of New South Wales in 2006. She then completed a Masters of Art at the Queensland University of Technology in 2012.

== Notable works ==
In 2015, in response to the decision by John Hancock Insurance to offer discounts if members shared their personal fitness data as logged by a Fitbit, Brain, alongside engineer Surya Mattu, created the website Unfit-Bits. The website offers solutions to spoof fitness data, to "produce data to qualify [users] for incentives from employers or insurers, even if they can't afford a high exercise lifestyle". This work was part of the exhibition, "24/7: A Wake Up Call for Our Non-Stop World" in 2019.

In 2020 she created the work, "New York Apartment", with collaborator Sam Lavigne. This work aggregates all New York City real-estate listings and presents them as a fictional massive apartment. Again in 2020, the pair collaborated on a website titled "Get Well Soon!", which archives over 20,000 comments from GoFundMe campaigns and lists them in alphabetical order. The New York Times described the piece as an "archive of well-wishes and fears, prayers and pleadings, represent a slice of the grief, love, medical costs and mutual aid that define illness in this country."
