= Dennis Brain =

Virtuoso horn player

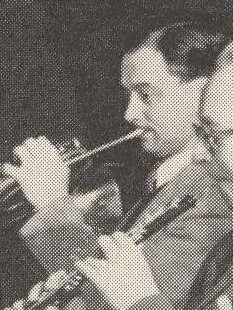
Brain, c. 1956

Dennis Brain (17 May 1921 – 1 September 1957) was a British horn player. From a musical family – his father and grandfather were horn players – he attended the Royal Academy of Music in London. During the Second World War he served in the Royal Air Force, playing in its band and orchestra. After the war, he was the principal horn of the Philharmonia and Royal Philharmonic orchestras, and played in chamber ensembles.

Among the works written for Brain is Benjamin Britten's Serenade for Tenor, Horn and Strings (1944). Other composers who wrote for him include Malcolm Arnold, Lennox Berkeley, Alan Bush, Gordon Jacob, Humphrey Searle and Mátyás Seiber.

Brain was killed in a car crash at the age of 36.

== Life and career ==
=== Early years ===
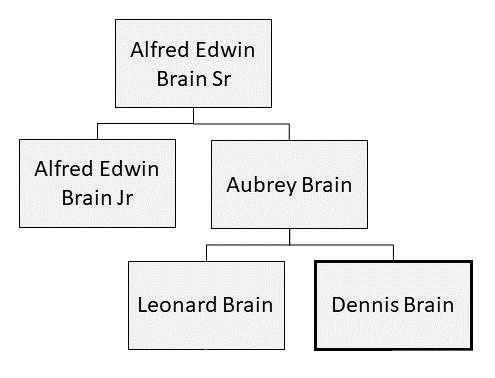

Brain was born in Hammersmith, London on 17 May 1921 to a musical family. His mother, Marion, née Beeley (1887–1954), was a singer at Covent Garden and his father, Aubrey Harold Brain, was first horn of the London Symphony Orchestra and regarded as "the leading exponent of the instrument in Britain at that time". Aubrey's father, Alfred Edwin Brain, Sr., and elder brother, Alfred Edwin Brain Jr., had been prominent horn players in Britain, and in the latter's case the US. (Note: Alfred Jr (1885–1966) emigrated to the US in 1923, where he was principal horn of the New York Symphony Orchestra and, for 14 years, of the Los Angeles Philharmonic Orchestra. He became manager of the Hollywood Bowl concerts and from 1943 until his retirement played in the film studio orchestras of MGM and 20th Century Fox.) Brain's elder brother, Leonard (1915–1975), became a leading player of the oboe and cor anglais, principal of the Royal Philharmonic Orchestra. Brain was educated at Richmond Hill Preparatory School and then St Paul's School, London. Although it was assumed that he would become a horn player, his father kept him largely away from the instrument as a boy, in the belief that it should not be played until the adult teeth developed. Brain was allowed to blow a few notes on his father's horn every Saturday morning, to maintain his interest, but his first musical studies were piano and organ.

In 1936 Brain was admitted to the Royal Academy of Music (RAM) to study horn under his father, who was a professor of the instrument there. He also studied piano with Max Pirani, organ with G. D. Cunningham and harmony with Montague Phillips. His professional début was on 6 October 1938 when he played in Bach's Brandenburg Concerto no. 1 (which features two concertante horn parts) as second horn to his father in the Queen's Hall, London, under the baton of Adolf Busch. The music critic of The Daily Telegraph wrote:

In the F major concerto Aubrey Brain was in his accustomed place as first horn but he had a new partner, his 17-year old son, Dennis, whose first appearance this was—a Queen's Hall event of no little interest. The famous family keeps up its traditions in the representative of the new generation. Son seconded father with a smoothness and certainty worthy of his name.

The following month Brain and his brother were soloists in a concert featuring Mozart's Horn Quintet (K. 407) and Oboe Quintet (K. 370). He appeared with ensembles including the Griller and Busch quartets and made broadcasts for the BBC, the first of which, in February 1939, featured Mozart's Divertimento in D (K334) with Aubrey as first horn and Dennis as second. In the same month father and son recorded the work for Columbia with the Léner Quartet.

=== RAF and wartime ===
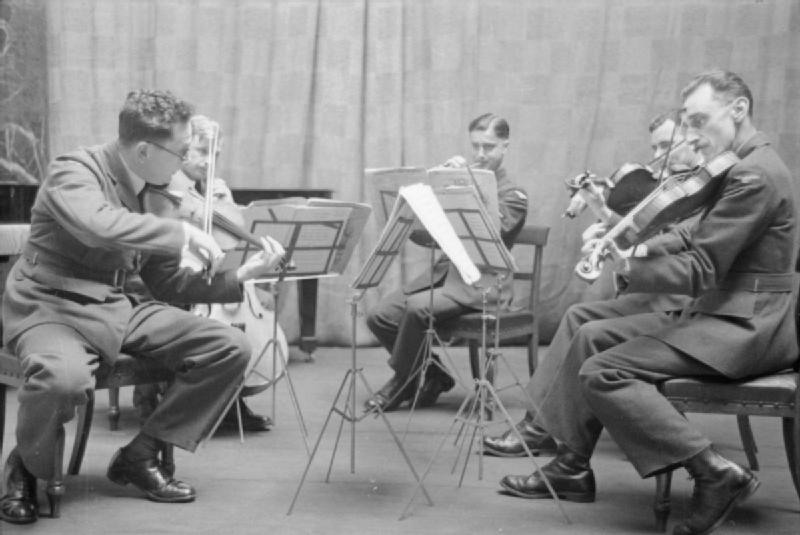
The Blech String Quartet playing the Mozart's horn quintet in E-flat major, with Brain (center) as soloist, 1943

At the start of the Second World War Brain and his brother joined the armed forces. Unlike Germany and Italy, Britain did not exempt musicians from conscription, but the conductor of the Central Band of the Royal Air Force, Wing Commander Rudolph O'Donnell, made considerable, and largely successful, efforts to ensure that, as Walter Legge put it, "every exceptionally able young instrumentalist knew that a place would be found for him in the RAF Band". The band became what The Independent described as "a legendary ensemble", and an RAF Symphony Orchestra was a spin-off. With them, Brain made a three-month tour of the US in 1944–45, and played during the Potsdam Conference in 1945.

Players in the RAF ensemble were allowed to perform for civilian managements when not required for official duties. Brain made 26 solo appearances in the wartime National Gallery concerts organised by Myra Hess, in a range of works including the Mozart Horn Quintet (K407) and the Brahms Trio for Horn, Violin and Piano (Op. 40), which became, as his biographer Tim Barringer writes, "his signature works in later years". For the BBC he made more than 20 broadcasts during the war for the home or forces networks, mostly of chamber music, but on one occasion playing the Mozart Horn Concerto K495 with the BBC Symphony Orchestra conducted by Sir Adrian Boult.

In mid-1942 Brain met the composer Benjamin Britten; the latter was writing incidental music, played by the RAF orchestra, for a series of BBC radio commentaries on war-time Britain which were being broadcast weekly to the US. Britten immediately recognised Brain's exceptional skill, and took little persuading to write a concert work for him. This was the Serenade for Tenor, Horn and Strings, premiered at the Wigmore Hall in October 1944 with Brain and Peter Pears as soloists. Britten acknowledged Brain's help during the composition of the work:

His help was invaluable in writing the work; but he was always most cautious in advising any alterations. Passages which seemed impossible even for his prodigious gifts were practised over and over again before any modifications were suggested, such was his respect for a composer's ideas.

=== Later years ===
By 1945, Brain, at 24 years of age, was the most sought-after horn player in England. His father injured himself in a fall, and retired from the BBC Symphony Orchestra, although he remained professor at the RAM until his death ten years later. After the war, Legge and Sir Thomas Beecham founded the Philharmonia and the Royal Philharmonic orchestras, respectively. Brain was principal horn in both, playing for Beecham alongside the woodwind players dubbed "the Royal Family" – Jack Brymer (clarinet), Gwydion Brooke (bassoon), Terence MacDonagh (oboe), and Gerald Jackson (flute). Later, he found that he did not have enough time to fill both positions and resigned from the Royal Philharmonic.

Brain originally played a French instrument, a Raoux piston-valve horn, similar to that used by his father. This type of instrument has a particularly fluid tone and a fine legato, but a less robust sound than the German-made instruments which were becoming common. In 1951 he switched to an Alexander single B♭ instrument. It had a custom lead pipe which was narrower than the usual, and offered a sound which, if not comparable to the Raoux, at least gave a nod in the direction of the lighter French instrument.

Pursuing his interest in chamber music, Brain formed a wind quintet with his brother in 1946. He also established a trio with the pianist Wilfrid Parry and violinist Jean Pougnet. Briefly, Brain put together a chamber ensemble consisting of his friends so that he could conduct. From 1945 he played with Karl Haas's London Baroque Ensemble, both on recordings and in concert. Showing his humorous style, Brain performed a Leopold Mozart horn concerto on a rubber hose pipe at a Gerard Hoffnung music festival in 1956, trimming the hose with garden shears to achieve the correct tuning.

In November 1953, under the direction of Herbert von Karajan, and accompanied by the Philharmonia, Brain recorded the four Mozart Horn Concertos for Columbia. In the same month, together with Sidney Sutcliffe (oboe), Bernard Walton (clarinet) and Cecil James (bassoon), he recorded Mozart's Sinfonia Concertante for Four Winds. In July 1954, again conducted by Karajan, Brain played the organ part in a recording of the Easter hymn from Pietro Mascagni's Cavalleria rusticana. With Sutcliffe, Walton, James and the pianist Walter Gieseking he recorded Mozart's Quintet for Piano and Winds, K452, in April 1955. Of Brain's other recordings, Legge singled out his playing in the four Brahms Symphonies conducted by Otto Klemperer, Mozart's B flat Divertimento with Karajan and Strauss's Der Rosenkavalier, "the horn-player's opera par excellence!"

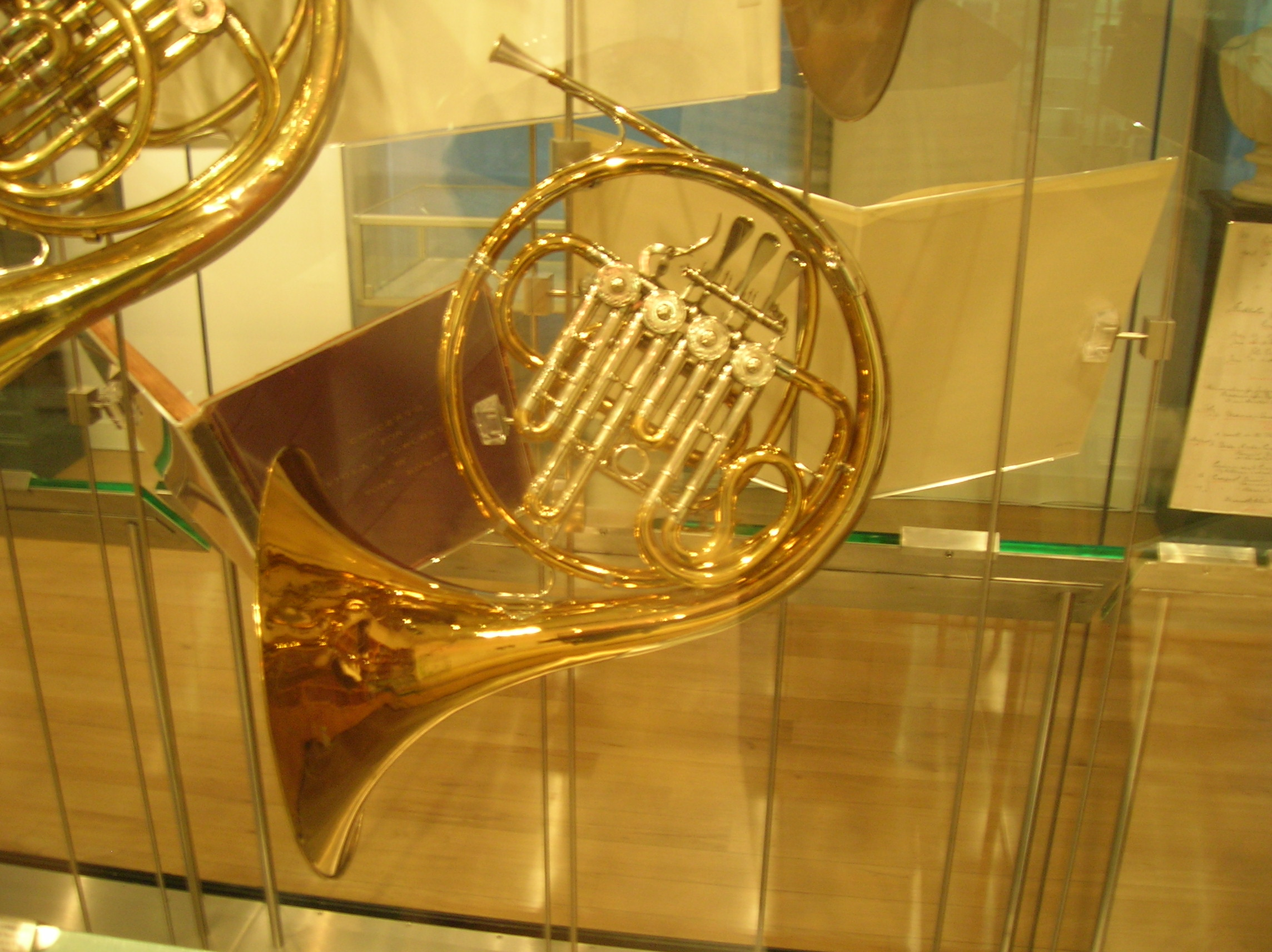
Brain's Alexander B♭/A model 90 horn, damaged in the crash, restored by Paxman and now on display at the Royal Academy of Music

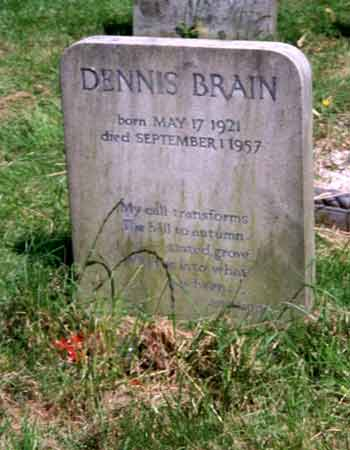
Brain's grave, Hampstead Cemetery, London

Brain was a keen motorist. His brother called him "the finest driver I have ever ridden with". Barringer writes that Brain bought

… a series of increasingly fast cars, a passion that he shared with the conductor Herbert von Karajan. A copy of the magazine Autocar was spotted on his music stand as he recorded the Mozart horn concertos, playing from memory. This enthusiasm led to tragedy.

On 1 September 1957, at the age of 36, Brain was killed driving home to London after performing the Tchaikovsky Symphony No. 6, Pathetique with the Philharmonia under Eugene Ormandy at the Edinburgh Festival. He had driven his Triumph TR2 sports car off the road and into a tree on the A1 road opposite the north gate of the De Havilland Aircraft factory at Hatfield.

Brain was interred at Hampstead Cemetery in London. His headstone is engraved with a passage from the "Declamation" section of Hindemith's Horn Concerto:

My call transforms
The hall to autumn-tinted groves
What is into what
Has been...

One of Brain's favourite horns (by Alexander of Mainz: a single B-flat horn with an F extension as a tuning slide) was badly damaged in his fatal crash. It has since been restored by Paxman Brothers of London and is on public display in the York Gate Collections at the RAM.

== New works and commemorations ==
As well as the Serenade for Tenor, Horn and Strings, Britten wrote Canticle III: Still falls the rain with Brain in mind; Brain and Pears, accompanied by the composer, gave the first performance at a concert in 1955 in which Brain also premiered two pieces by Alan Bush. Other composers who wrote for Brain were Malcolm Arnold (Horn Concerto No. 2), Lennox Berkeley (Trio for Horn, Violin and Piano), York Bowen (Concerto for Horn, Strings and Timpani), Hindemith (Concerto for Horn and Orchestra), Gordon Jacob (Concerto for Horn and String Orchestra), Elisabeth Lutyens (Horn Concerto), Humphrey Searle (Aubade for Horn and Strings), Mátyás Seiber (Notturno for Horn and Strings), and Ernest Tomlinson (Rhapsody and Rondo for Horn and Orchestra, Romance and Rondo for Horn and Orchestra).

Francis Poulenc wrote Élégie for Horn and Piano to commemorate Brain's death. It was premiered by the BBC in a broadcast on 17 February 1958, played by Neill Sanders with Poulenc at the piano.

In its obituary notice, The Times said of Brain:

The traditional uncertainties of the instrument never seemed to have occasioned a fluffed note from him and no technical difficulties ever appeared to cause him the slightest apprehension. He professed to have no nerves, though his playing lacked nothing in musical sensitiveness, but insensitiveness to risk seems to have exacted a heavy price and English music will be poorer by the loss of so brilliant an executant at the early age of 36.

== Notes, references and sources ==
=== Sources ===
- Foreman, Lewis; Susan Foreman (2005). London: A Musical Gazetteer. New Haven: Yale University Press. ISBN 978-0-30-010402-8.
- Gamble, Stephen; William Lynch (2011). Dennis Brain: A Life in Music. Denton: University of North Texas Press. ISBN 978-1-57-441307-6.
- Schwarzkopf, Elisabeth (1982). On and Off the Record: A Memoir of Walter Legge. London: Faber and Faber. ISBN 978-0-57-111928-8.
