= Alfred Edwin Brain Sr. =

English player of the French horn

Alfred Edwin Brain (February 4, 1860 in Turnham Green, London – October 25, 1929 in London) was an English player of the French horn. He was the founder of a great school of English horn playing. His grandson Dennis Brain was to become perhaps the most famous horn player of all time.

Brain was born in 1860. His father fought in the Crimean War and was an invalid. Brain was not well educated. When he was 12 he joined the Scots Guards and played the horn in the band. He married in 1880 and had seven children. Two of the children became great horn players: Alfred and Aubrey.

He played in several orchestras, including the Philharmonic Society, the Queen's Hall Orchestra and Covent Garden. He played a lot for Henry Wood in The Proms. In orchestras he nearly always played fourth horn, so his nickname was "George IV". In 1904, he became a founding member of the London Symphony Orchestra. The four horn players in that orchestra, Adolf Borsdorf, Thomas Busby, Henri Van der Meerschen and Brain, were often called "God's Own Quartet" because they blended together so well.

He died in 1929 after a short retirement.
