= Alfred Edwin Brain Jr. =

English player of the French horn

Alfred Edwin Brain Jr. (born London, 24 October 1885; died Los Angeles, 29 March 1966) was an English French horn player.

== Life ==
Brain came from a family of horn players, including his nephew, Dennis Brain. His father, Alfred Edwin Brain Sr. was also a well-known horn player. Brain started to learn the trumpet when he was six, but when he was twelve, he changed to the French horn and learned from his father. He studied at the Royal Academy of Music with Adolf Borsdorf, learning the piano from G.D. Cunningham, who taught his nephew the pipe organ forty years later. His first professional job was with the Scottish Orchestra. He then played in the Queen’s Hall Orchestra and the London Symphony Orchestra.

When World War I broke out, he joined the Scots Guards. In 1917, he worked in France, where the fighting was taking place. After the war, Brain was awarded the British War Medal and Victory Medal for his bravery.

When he returned to London after the war, along with his brother Aubrey Brain, he worked with several London-based orchestras, including at Covent Garden where he played with Sir Thomas Beecham.

In 1923, Brain emigrated to the United States. He played in the New York Philharmonic Orchestra and later for the Los Angeles Philharmonic Orchestra. In his later years in movie studios, including for 20th Century Fox.
