= Joseph Brain (cricketer) =

English cricketer

Personal information
- Born: 11 September 1863; Bristol, Gloucestershire
- Died: 26 June 1914 (aged 50); Cardiff, Wales
- Batting: Right-handed
- Bowling: Right-arm medium
- Role: Wicket-keeper

Domestic team information
- Years: Team
- 1883–1889: Gloucestershire
- 1884–1887: Oxford University
- Source: Cricinfo, 1 April 2014

Joseph Hugh Brain (11 September 1863 – 26 June 1914) was an English cricketer. He was educated at Clifton College and Oriel College, Oxford, and played cricket for Gloucestershire between 1883 and 1889.

He became managing director of the family brewery, S. A. Brain & Co. Ltd in Cardiff, which was founded by his father and brother, and served on the board of Cardiff City F.C.
