= Abel Pereira (musician) =

Portuguese hornist (born 1978)

- Born: 1978 (age 47–48); Porto, Portugal
- Occupations: Horn player; Conductor
- Awards: European Master Prize; Leeuwarden International Horn Competition; Concertino Praha Competition; Premio de Jovens Musicos, RDP Antena 2

Abel Pereira (born 1978) is a Portuguese horn player. He played as soloist and principal horn in major European orchestras, such as Porto Symphony Orchestra, Barcelona Symphony, Frankfurt Radio Symphony, Dallas Symphony, Philadelphia Orchestra, Los Angeles Philharmonic, Chicago Symphony Orchestra, Chamber Orchestra of Europe, Berlin Philharmonic and London Philharmonic Orchestra. Since 2014, he has been principal horn of Washington's National Symphony Orchestra. Pereira won several awards and prizes, including the 1998 European Master Prize.

== Early life and education ==
Pereira was born into a family of fishermen in Porto. When he was 10, he started playing French horn at the STCP wind band school of music. He had his first solo performance, Mozart's third horn concerto, at the age of 11.

After attending ARTAVE Professional High School of Music he went to study with Bohdan Sebestik at the School of Music (Escola Superior de Música e Artes do Espetáculo, ESMAE) at the Technical University of Porto, where he graduated in 1999. He continued his studies in Germany with Marie-Luise Neunecker before he received his master in music industry marketing in 2008 and his PhD in coaching/performance in 2012, both degrees at the University of Porto. During his training he played with the Portuguese Youth Orchestra, Ibero-American Youth Orchestra, Mediterranean Youth Orchestra, European Union Youth Orchestra, and attended master classes with Radovan Vlatkoviæ, Jeffrey Bryant, Stefan Dohr, Dale Clevenger and Hermann Baumann.

== Career as horn player ==
Pereira was the guest soloist at the 36th International Horn Symposium in Valencia, Spain, in 2004. In 2007, he was the artistic director of the First National Horn Congress in Porto. Between 2010 and 2012, he was the guest principal horn in the London Philharmonic Orchestra.

He was a Featured Artist at the 45th International Horn Symposium in Memphis, Tennessee, in 2013, where he premiered as a soloist the horn concerto that the composer Luís Tinoco dedicated to him.

Pereira had his first concert with the Berlin Philharmonic in September 2013 as guest principal horn. He also acted as guest principal horn with the Chamber Orchestra of Europe and Frankfurt Radio Symphony.

Washington's National Symphony Orchestra (NSO) hired Pereira as principal horn in 2014, during the tenure of Christoph Eschenbach.

One of the high points of Pereira's years in the NSO was the spring 2015 performance of Mahler's 9th Symphony, in which he produced "exquisite and always accurate solos" while leading a horn section with "particularly ebullient and solid playing ... with almost military precision".

Pereira became a member of Kennedy Center Chamber Players, drawn from the NSO membership, with whom he first performed at their first concert of the 2015 season. His performance was praised as being "in top form ... with a consistently elegiac tone, unwavering breath support and power when needed".

Describing his role in the NSO, Anne Midgette wrote: "Pereira, the principal horn player, has been a motivating force; other players are encouraged simply that the orchestra was able to win someone of his caliber. ... Pereira would make a good poster boy for a new NSO, one representing the very best of musical quality."

He performed more than 50 solo concerts with many internationally renowned orchestras, and played and taught at international music festivals such as Festival de Música do Estoril, Festival de Música de Sintra, Festival de Música da Póvoa de Varzim, CCB Summer Fest, Miami Summer Music Festival, HALCYON New Hampshire, Stellenbosch Chamber Music Festival, Festival de Artes de Maputo, Festival de Musique de Besançon, Ossiacher Festspiele Austria, Salzburger Festspiele, BBC Proms, Diaghilev Festival Perm, Athens Music Fest, Festspielhaus Baden-Baden, Berliner Festspiele, National Orchestra Institute, National Youth Orchestra, and the Brazilian Horn Association.

He has been working with conductors and soloists including Carlo Maria Giulini, Mstislav Rostropovich, Bernard Haitink, Sir Colin Davis, Vladimir Ashkenazy, Claudio Abbado, Vladimir Jurowski, Simon Rattle, Emanuel Ax, Radu Lupu, Martha Argerich, Renée Fleming, Anne-Sophie Mutter, and Lang Lang. He was the principal horn of the Porto Symphony Orchestra, Casa da Música, for 14 years. Pereira has been hailed as "one of the most renowned Portuguese interpreters of all time".

He plays an Alexander 103 horn with a V. Bach 3 mouthpiece.

== Other musical and educational work ==
He studied conducting with Colin Metters, Sir Colin Davis and Jorma Panula at the Royal Academy of Music in London. Pereira was assistant conductor for the Ossiach Youth Orchestra in Austria, National Orchestra Institute (USA) and National Youth Orchestra, New York. He was a professor at the Academia Nacional Superior de Orquestra (ANSO) at the University of Lisbon and at Escola Superior de Música e Artes do Espetáculo (ESMAE) at the Polytechnic Institute of Porto.

He studied choral conducting with Gunter Argleb and orchestra conducting with Alvaro Salazar at Porto University. Later he attended master classes with professor Colin Matters at the Royal Academy of Music in London and with Maestro Jorma Panula. Pereira was also on the jury for the European Union Youth Orchestra for 10 years and the brass coach for the Ossiach Youth Orchestra in Austria.

Pereira was assistant conductor for the Ossiach Youth Orchestra in Austria, National Orchestra Institute (USA) and National Youth Orchestra, New York.

In 2016, he was appointed music director of the Eclipse Chamber Orchestra and later became the principal conductor of the Kennedy Center Youth Orchestra. Pereira has been deeply engaged in numerous outreach and community projects, coaching and conducting in El Sistema (Venezuela). He was the music director for the Rio Youth Orchestra, working with students from various favelas in Rio de Janeiro (Brazil), led the Sound Impact community project in San Jose, Costa Rica, participated in Portugal's multi-racial initiative "Music without Color", and spearheaded several diversity, equity, and inclusion projects in the Washington, DC Metropolitan Area.

Additionally, Pereira held professorships at ANSO (Lisbon University), ESMAE (Porto University), and Peabody Conservatory (Baltimore). He has also been a guest professor at Miami University, Indiana University, Curtis Institute, Lynn University, University of Maryland, Royal College of Music, Guildhall School of Drama and Music, and Berlin Hochschule für Musik.

His conducting experience includes the Noya Symphony Orchestra in Spain, Orchestra Sinfonia di Rimini in Italy, Vilnius Chamber Orchestra in Lithuania, Zadar Symphony in Croatia and the Eclipse Chamber Orchestra in Washington, DC.

Pereira was a founding member of the ARZTIZ Woodwind Quintet, Porto Brass Quintet and music director of the Portuguese Horn Ensemble. He is the music director of Eclipse Chamber Orchestra.

He has held master classes in Portugal, Spain, Macao, India, Cape Verde, Brazil, Venezuela, Austria, Switzerland, Germany, The United Kingdom, South Africa, and the United States. In 2001 he recorded Mozart's second horn concerto for BBC Television's Mozart for Children.

== Awards and recognition ==
Pereira won the 1998 European Master Prize, which was awarded to him by Vladimir Ashkenazy, Bernard Haitink and Lutz Kohler. He also won the Prémio Jovens Músicos – RDP Antena 2, in 1997.

Pereira was awarded at the Leeuwarden International Horn Competition (the Netherlands), Internationaler Instrumentalwettbewerb Markneukirchen (Germany), Concertino Praga (Czech Republic), National Wind Competition (Portugal), Conservatory Souza Lima (Brazil), and Arouca's City Hall (Portugal).

== Discography ==
Pereira's solo discography includes:

- The complete Mozart Horn Concertos (AP Records)
- The Urtext Mozart 4th Concerto (EMI Classics)
- Romantic Repertoire for Horn and Piano, the Horn Concerto No. 1 by Richard Strauss, and Mozart's Sinfonia Concertante (Stellenbosch University Records)
