= Robert Freund =

Austrian musician

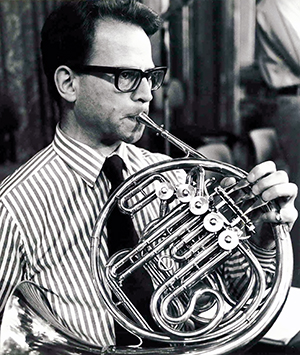
Robert Freund playing horn

Robert Freund (born 18 June 1932 in Vienna, Austria) is an Austrian horn player.

== Life and career ==
Robert Freund grew up in Vienna. From early childhood, he has been enthusiastic about everything musical, and could not be kept from piano practice. In the post-war period he was sent to Switzerland. by the Swiss Red Cross, spent his high school years (1946–53) at the seminary school in Engelberg (Stiftsschule Engelberg) and played the trombone, tuba, snare drum and trumpet in the local Youth Brass band. After his high school certificate and upon his return to Vienna, Robert sought to study the trumpet at the Conservatory – without an instrument –, but the admissions jury convinced him to choose the "more urgently needed horn". So he began studying with Franz Koch, and switched to Gottfried von Freiberg at the Vienna Music Academy in the fall of 1955.

At the same time, since the profession of a musician was deemed to be extremely uncertain, Robert Freund graduated from the Vienna School of Hotel Management and began to study Interpreting at Vienna University with French and Spanish as foreign languages. His language skills allowed him to become a licensed Vienna City Guide in 1958 and he carried out this activity for nearly 40 years besides his musical studies and his performance in various orchestras.

His first engagement came before he even completed his horn studies, at Philharmonia Hungarica, the Hungarian refugee ensemble, as of January 1959 on the first horn. His first orchestra tours took him to Italy, as well as the United States and Canada at the end of 1959. As of 1959, he was first horn at the Tonkünstler Orchestra (up to 1967), and played at the Burgtheater orchestra (1960–66). From 1967 to 1982, he was solo hornplayer at the Vienna Symphony Orchestra under conductors such as Eugen Jochum, Carlo Maria Giulini, Wolfgang Sawallisch, Josef Krips, Erich Leinsdorf, Karl Böhm, Horst Stein, Christoph Eschenbach, Mstislav Rostropovich, Hans Swarowsky, Lovro von Matačić and Gennady Rozhdestvensky. Freund also was a member of the Eichendorff quintet from 1961 to 1967, of the Vienna Bläserquintett from 1967 to 1982, touring frequently on the national and international stage (Middle East, Germany, France, England, Switzerland, Hungary), and he performed repeatedly between 1971 and 1978 with the ensemble "die reihe". From 1984 to 1990 he extensively travelled to Nagano (Japan) with the Vienna Academy Ensemble led by Wolfgang Poduschka, directing, performing as a soloist, playing chamber music and giving horn lessons. Freund's work as a soloist – besides his official obligations at the Vienna Symphony – includes performances at the Vienna Festival, the Montreux Festival and the Salzburg Festival, as well as participating in tours of other orchestras (e.g. the Vienna Philharmonic Orchestra – Japan 1977) as first horn, directed by Carlos Kleiber, Karl Böhm, Christoph von Dohnány and Herbert von Karajan.

In parallel, he was horn professor at the Vienna Conservatory (1970–1997), built up a French horn class in Oberschützen (as part of University of Music and Performing Arts Graz) and taught at University of Music and Performing Arts Graz from 1982 to 1997.

Robert Freund is the author of a French Horn Method for Young Beginners in 3 volumes in German and English and a Method of Rhythm for Beginners. In 2019, he initiated the publishing of the Funeral Music from the Adagio of Bruckner's Symphony No. 7 in four different versions (by Löwe, Stiegler and Freiberg). An article about his research and findings was published by the International Bruckner Society in Dec. 2019. In 2020, Freund published an extensive biography of his horn teacher Gottfried von Freiberg, nearly 60 years after his death. Up until today, Freund is a great defender of the Viennese sound style and musical tradition, which he learned from Freiberg among others.

Robert Freund is a member of the International Horn Society.

== Solo concerts ==
- 12 March 1964: Richard Strauss, Horn Concerto No. 1 (Linzer Konzertverein, Leopold Mayer), Linz
- 7–10 March 1965: W.A. Mozart, Horn Concerto No. 4 (Tonkünstler Orchestra, Carlo Zecchi), Musikverein (4x)
- 15 January 1967: W.A. Mozart, Horn Concerto No. 4 (Tonkünstler Orchestra, Zecchi)
- 6 May 1967: Richard Strauss, Horn Concerto No. 2 (Tonkünstler Orchestra, Guschlbauer), Linz
- 21 May 1967: W.A. Mozart, Horn Concerto No. 4 (Tonkünstler Orchestra, Koslik), St. Pölten
- 3 December 1974: W.A. Mozart, Horn Concerto No. 3 (Vienna Chamber Orchestra, Stein), Konzerthaus, Wien
- 30 May 1980: Richard Strauss, Horn Concerto No. 1 (Kapfenberg Orchestra), Kapfenberg
- 31 March 1981: Kurt Schwertsik, Solo Concert for Alphorn, recording ORF Graz
- 7 June 1980: Vienna Festival, Johannes Brahms, Horn Trio op. 40 written for natural horn, with Josef Suk (Stradivarius) and Elisabeth Leonskaja (Brahms' Grand Piano). Musikverein, Brahmssaal
- 26 April 1981: Joseph Haydn, Horn Concerto No. 1 (Oberschützen Chamber Orchestra, Auersperg), Eisenstadt
- 13 October 1985: On the Natural horn. Beethoven's Horn Sonata and Brahms' Horn Trio. Vienna Collection of Ancient Musical Instruments at the Hofburg, Hans Petermandl (piano), Beethoven's grand piano, M. Schnitzler (violin)
- April 1987: Leopold Mozart, Alphorn Concerto (Vienna Chamber Orchestra, Prikopa), Linz
- December 1991: Leopold Mozart, Alphorn Concerto (Göttinger Symphonie Orchester, Christian Simonis), Göttingen

== World premieres ==
Four world premieres of modern horn concertos: Karl Pilss, Paul Walter Fürst, Otto Schneider and Kurt Schwertsik: Alphorn Concerto, 15/17 May 1977 (Tamsweg and Musikverein), Tonkünstler Orchestra, Simonis.

== Recordings ==
- Wolfgang Amadeus Mozart, Horn Concertos No. 1 und 3. N.Ö. Symphonie-Orchester Vienna directed by Wilfried Böttcher · Robert Freund. Concert Hall – SMS 2484. Vinyl, LP 1967
- Wolfgang Amadeus Mozart, Horn Concertos No. 2 und 4. N.Ö. Symphonie-Orchester Vienna directed by Karl Österreicher · Robert Freund. Concert Hall – SMS 2655. Vinyl, LP 1967
- Franz Schubert, Auf dem Strom – Anton Dermota, Hilda Dermota, Robert Freund. Preiser Records, SPR 3292. Vinyl, LP 1978
- Georg Philipp Telemann, Tafelmusik. Concerto in E flat for two horns, strings and continuo – Tonkünstler Orchestra, Vienna directed by Dietfried Bernet. Hilde Langfort (continuo), Robert Freund (first horn), Hannes Sungler (second horn). Musical Heritage Society – MHS 641/642. Vinyl, LP 1966
- CD Collection: "Gicksen Sie nicht…" 9 CDs, all recordings including Robert Freund.

== Printed works ==
French Horn Method for Young Beginners in 3 volumes, in German and English (Doblinger):

- Robert Freund: French Horn Method for the Young Beginner vol. 1. First edited in 1977, Doblinger. New edition, Vienna, Munich 2002, 56 pages, Catalogue No: DOB695, ISMN 9990050053570
- Robert Freund: French Horn Method for Young Beginner vol. 2. First edited in 1978 (D. 15. 866). New edition 2002, Doblinger, Vienna, Munich, Catalogue No: DOB695, 63 pages, ISMN 979-0012158660
- Robert Freund: French Horn Method for the Young Beginner vol. 3a. Easy To Medium Difficult, Standard Etudes. Doblinger, Vienna, Munich 1992, 35 pages, Reference: DOBL5615, ISMN 979-0-012-17270-3
- Robert Freund: Waldhornschule 3b. Easy To Medium Difficult, Standard Etudes. First edition 1979: D. 16.058 Doblinger, Vienna, Munich 2002, 32 pages, ISMN M-012-17271-0

Robert Freund, I Get Rhythm. Method of Rhythm for Beginners. Doblinger, Vienna. Reference DOBL 5614, 2002. ISMN 979-0-012-16058-8.

Robert and Guta Freund, 20 Volkslieder – Leichte Trios für 3 Hörner (oder andere Instrumente im Violinschlüssel). Movements/Arrangements. Edited by Robert and Guta Freund. First edition 1988, D. 17.318. Ludwig Doblinger, Vienna and Munich. Reference Doblinger: 05 623

Löwe, Stiegler, Freiberg, Freund, Funeral music, Adagio of Anton Bruckner's Symphony no. 7 in 4 versions by Ferdinand Löwe (18 horns), Karl Stiegler (9 horns) and Gottfried von Freiberg (8 and 5 horns). LANOLINO MUSIKVERLAG, LMV-019, 020, 021, 022, St. Pölten-Pottenbrunn, 2019.

Robert Freund, Gottfried von Freiberg. Hornist – Lehrer – Vorbild, Eigenverlag, Wien 2020. ISBN 978-3-200-07279-4 English version: Gottfried von Freiberg. Hornist – Teacher – Role Model, self-published, Vienna 2022. ISBN 978-3-200-08783-5 Translated by Elisabeth Freund Ducatez.

Anton Partl, Walter Pohl (editors), Verschickt in die Schweiz, Kriegskinder entdecken eine bessere Welt (Damit es nicht verlorengeht ...), chapter "Schwyzerdütsch wurde zu meiner zweiten Muttersprache" by Robert Freund, publisher Böhlau Vienna, 2005. ISBN 3205774264.
