= Horn Concerto No. 1 =

Horn Concerto No. 1 may refer to:

- Horn Concerto No. 1 (Haydn)
- Horn Concerto No. 1 (Mozart)
- Horn Concerto No. 1 (Strauss)
