= Op. 47 =

In music, Op. 47 stands for Opus number 47. Compositions that are assigned this number include:

- Albéniz – Suite Española No. 1
- Barber – Third Essay
- Beethoven – Violin Sonata No. 9
- Britten – Five Flower Songs
- Bruch – Kol Nidrei
- Chopin – Ballade No. 3
- Dvořák – Bagatelles
- Elgar – Introduction and Allegro
- Ginastera – Sonata for guitar
- Holst – Egdon Heath
- Prokofiev – Symphony No. 4
- Saint-Saëns – Samson and Delilah
- Schumann – Piano Quartet
- Shostakovich – Symphony No. 5
- Sibelius – Violin Concerto in D minor (1904, revised 1905)
- Strauss – Des Dichters Abendgang
