= Horn Concerto No. 2 (Strauss) =

Composition for horn and orchestra by Richard Strauss

- Concerto by Richard Strauss
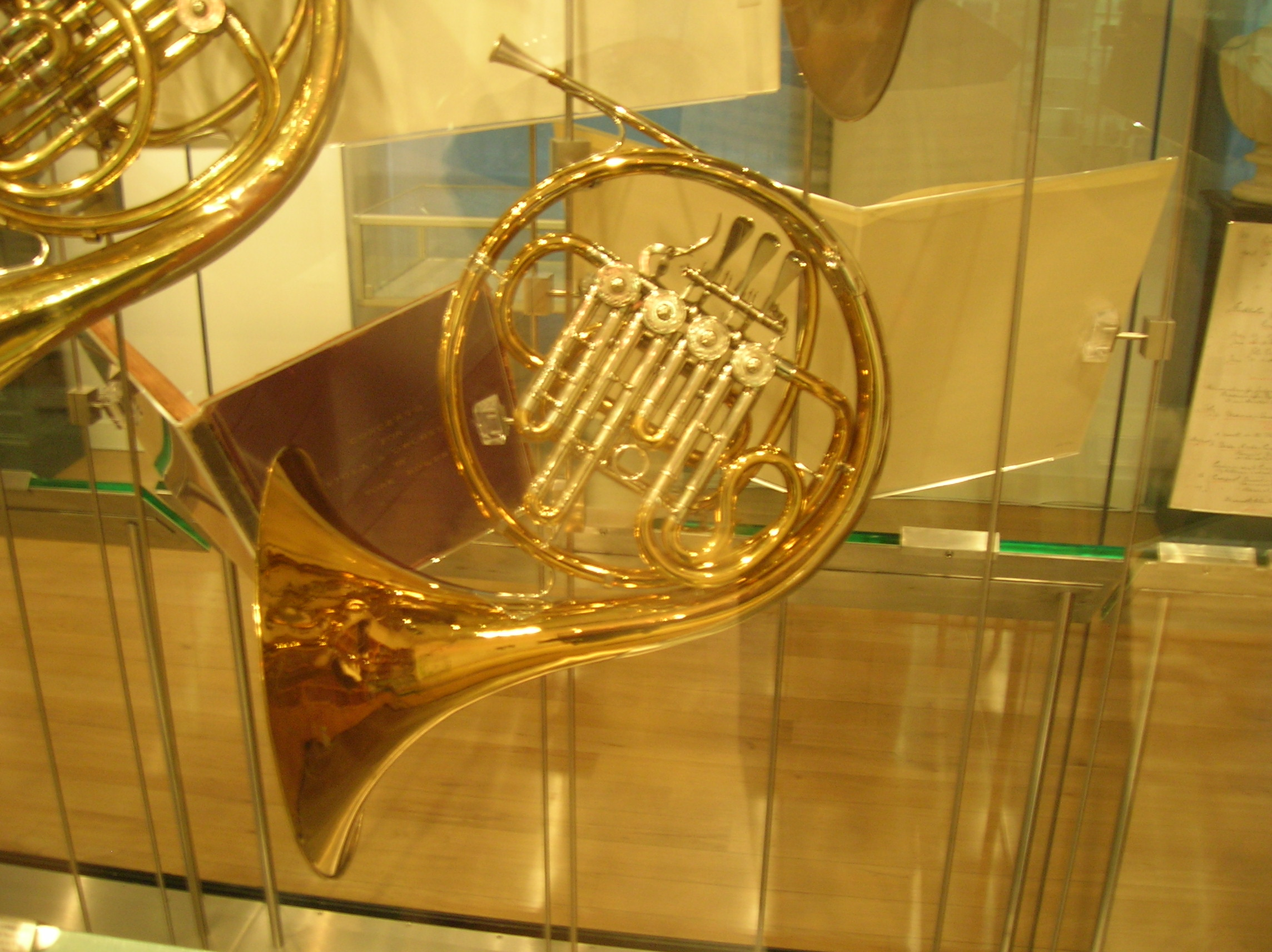
- Dennis Brain's horn
- English: Second concerto in E♭ major for horn and orchestra
- Native name: Zweites Konzert in Es-Dur für Horn und Orchester
- Key: E♭ major
- Catalogue: TrV 283
- Composed: Completed 28 November 1942
- Dedication: To the memory of my father
- Performed: 11 August 1943, Gottfried von Freiberg (horn), Karl Böhm (conductor) with the Vienna Philharmonic at the Salzburg Festival
- Scoring: horn; orchestra

Richard Strauss composed his Horn Concerto No. 2 in E♭ major, (TrV 283) whilst living in Vienna in 1942. The work was premiered in 1943 at the Salzburg Festival and was recorded in 1944, both with solo horn Gottfried von Freiberg. The score was published by Boosey & Hawkes of London in 1950. It was taken up and popularised by the British horn player Dennis Brain. It has since become the most performed and recorded horn concerto of the 20th century.

== Composition history ==
The premiere of Strauss's opera Capriccio was on 28 October 1942. Strauss wrote "My life's work has been concluded with Capriccio. Whatever notes I scribble down now have no bearing on musical history." A couple of days later he drove to Vienna where he was to stay for over 6 months. The horn concerto seems to have been written very quickly: his note book indicates that the draft was finished on 11 November, and the final score two weeks later on the 28th (he added a note at the end "In the beautiful house at Vienna"). The autograph score indicates that it is dedicated "To the memory of my father", although this did not make it into the published version. The speed of composition may reflect that it had been on his mind for sometime, as the principal horn player at Munich, Professor Josef Suttner, had asked him years before to write a second concerto. Strauss also mentioned the second concerto in a program list written in 1941.

Since finishing An Alpine Symphony in 1915 until 1942, Strauss devoted himself almost completely to operatic works, with no substantial orchestral works. The few orchestral works from this period include the ballet Schlagobers (1922), the two Couperin Suites (the 1923 Dance suite and the 1941 Divertimento) and Japanese Festival Music (1940). The Second Horn Concerto was the first in a series of late works often referred to as his Indian summer, which include Metamorphosen, his Oboe Concerto, the Duet concertino for clarinet and bassoon, ending with his Four Last Songs written just before his death in 1949. He gave no opus number to any of these late works and none were published during his lifetime.

The Strauss family was not in a good place in late 1942. His wife Pauline had developed problems with her sight, whilst Richard developed serious influenza. The safety of his Jewish daughter-in-law Alice and grandchildren remained precarious: part of the reason for staying in Vienna was the protection provided by the Nazi governor of Vienna, Baldur von Schirach, who was a great admirer of Strauss and his music. The mass deportations of Jews started in 1941. In the summer of 1942 Strauss had become involved in the unsuccessful attempts of his son Franz and Alice to help her relatives emigrate to Switzerland. Strauss himself visited the Theresienstadt concentration camp where he greeted the SS guards with the words "I am the composer Richard Strauss" and was duly sent away without being able to see Alice's relatives who were incarcerated there (26 of Alice's Jewish relatives were to die before the end of the war). Norman Del Mar wrote in 1972: "It is indeed hard to believe that this is the work of a depressed old man living in fear of disgrace from the authorities of a war-beleaguered country, so light and carefree a style did he capture." Clearly, composing provided an escape from the uncertainty and horrors unfolding around him. It also reflected his aesthetic that art and culture were the highest human achievement that transcended history. In 1900 he had set Uhland's song "Des Dichters Abendgang" (The poets evening stroll), which expressed this view that "When the dark clouds roll down..You carry within yourself the blessing of song. The light, that you saw there, Gently shines upon you on the dark paths."

== Performance history ==
The premier was given at the Salzburg Festival on 11 August 1943 with the horn player Gottfried von Freiberg as the soloist and Karl Böhm conducting the Vienna Philharmonic. The same combination recorded it soon after. Richard Strauss himself was not present at the premiere, but had been at the festival earlier and left on 9 August after conducting some all-Mozart concerts to return home to Garmisch. He had, however, worked with Böhm and Gottfried during his stay: the signed autograph manuscript used for the premiere is dated August 8.

The concerto was played a second time on 4 October 1943 in Budapest in a live broadcast concert on Hungarian Radio with the horn played by Max Zimolong and Ľudovít Rajter conducting the orchestra of the Hungarian Royal Opera, and a third time on 26 May 1944, again with soloist Max Zimolong and Karl Elmendorff conducting the Staatskapelle Dresden.

British horn player Dennis Brain performed it with the Vienna Philharmonic in 1948, later recording it with the Philharmonia Orchestra conducted by Wolfgang Sawallisch. The US premiere was given on 8 October 1948 with soloist Anthony Miranda and the Little Orchestra of New York conducted by Thomas Sherman, and a year later at the Tanglewood with James Stagliano on horn and the Boston Symphony Orchestra conducted by Eleazar de Carvalho.

The concerto went on to become the most performed of 20th-century horn concertos (it was performed twice in the finals of the BBC Young Musician competition, in 1988 by the winner David Pyatt and in 2016 by runner-up Ben Goldscheider).

== Structure ==
The concerto is written in a conservative style that looks back to the musical world of his teenage years as represented by his first horn concerto, which was completed in 1883. Strauss follows the typical fast-slow-fast structure of classical concerti, with the three movements in E♭ major, A♭ major, and E♭ major.

1. Allegro
2. Andante con moto
3. Rondo: Allegro molto

Juergen May writes:

Still, there are "Straussian" melodic shapes, harmonic successions, and rhythmic characteristics that reveal the identity of their creator. The composer looks back to a past aesthetic from the perspective of someone who has lived through the paradigm changes of the nineteenth and twentieth centuries. In that respect, one might call the work postmodern.

Norman Del Mar wrote that "...the piece had turned into a singular success from first to last. It is the freedom and originality of form, especially in the opening allegro which reveals the experienced master as compared to the first concerto". Whilst the outer movements are virtuosic, the middle movement is a "beautifully proportioned miniature and particularly well conceived as a relaxation for the soloist between the exacting outer movements."

== Recordings ==
There have been many recordings of this piece. The first generally released recording was by Dennis Brain in 1957, with the Philharmonia Orchestra conducted by Wolfgang Sawallisch. However, the 1944 world premier recording has recently become available. Those currently available with orchestral accompaniment include:

CD title and release date (if known)	Horn player	Orchestra and conductor	Label and reference
Mozart: Serenade No. 13 in G major, K525 'Eine kleine Nachtmusik', etc.	Gottfried von Freiberg	Vienna Philharmonic, Karl Böhm	Orfeo - C376941B
Dennis Brain: The essential collection Vol.5 (2014)	Dennis Brain	Philharmonia Orchestra, Wolfgang Sawallisch	Documents 299708
Zdeněk Tylšar: Richard Strauss / Franz Strauss / Mozart: Horn Concertos (2006)	Zdeněk Tylšar	Czech Philharmonic, Václav Neumann	Supraphon SU 3892-2
Richard Strauss: Concerto pour hautbois; Deuxième concerto pour cor	Georges Barboteu	Bamberger Symphony, Theodor Guschlbauer	Erato: STU 70390
Die schonsten Hornkonzerte (2009)	Hermann Baumann	WDR Symphony Orchestra Cologne, Günter Wand	Profil Medien PH08075
Strauss: Horn Concertos Nos. 1 & 2 (2013)	Marie-Luise Neunecker	Bamberg Symphony, Ingo Metzmacher	EMI 7235472
Richard Strauss: Horn concertos 1 and 2 (1997)	Ronald Janezic	Vienna Philharmonic, André Previn	Deutsche Gramaphon E4534832
Strauss - The Concertos (1999)	Barry Tuckwell	London Symphony Orchestra, István Kertész	Decca E4602962
Strauss: Horn Concerto No. 1 in E flat major, Op. 11, etc.	Barry Tuckwell	Royal Philharmonic Orchestra, Vladimir Ashkenazy	Australian Eloquence: ELQ4762699
R Strauss: Horn Concertos 1 & 2, Oboe Concerto (2006)	Hermann Baumann	Leipzig Gewandhaus Orchestra, Kurt Masur	Philips: 4769188
R. Strauss: Orchestral Works and Concertos (2014)	Myron Bloom	Cleveland Orchestra, George Szell	Sony: 88883798632
Daniel Barenboim conducts R. Strauss (2010)	Dale Clevenger	Chicago Symphony Orchestra, Daniel Barenboim	Apex 2564679408
R. Strauss: Complete Orchestral Works (2013)	Peter Damm	Staatskapelle Dresden, Rudolf Kempe	Warner Classics: 4317802
Richard Strauss: Orchestral works (2011)	Norbert Hauptmann	Berlin Philharmonic, Herbert von Karajan	Deutsche Grammophon DG 4779814
Richard Strauss Concerto in E-Flat Major, AV132	Ignat Verichkov	Plovdiv Philharmonic Orchestra, Nayden Todorov	Music Minus One: ISBN 978-1596152250
Martin Owen plays Strauss, Schumann & Weber (2023)	Martin Owen	BBC Philharmonic, John Wilson	Chandos: CHAN 20168
Strauss, R.: Horn Concertos Nos. 1 and 2 / 4 Letzte Lieder (Golden Horizon) (2024)	Christoph Eß	Aachen Symphony Orchestra, Christopher Ward	Naxos: 8.551473
