= Horn Concertos (Mozart) =

Compositions by Wolfgang Amadeus Mozart

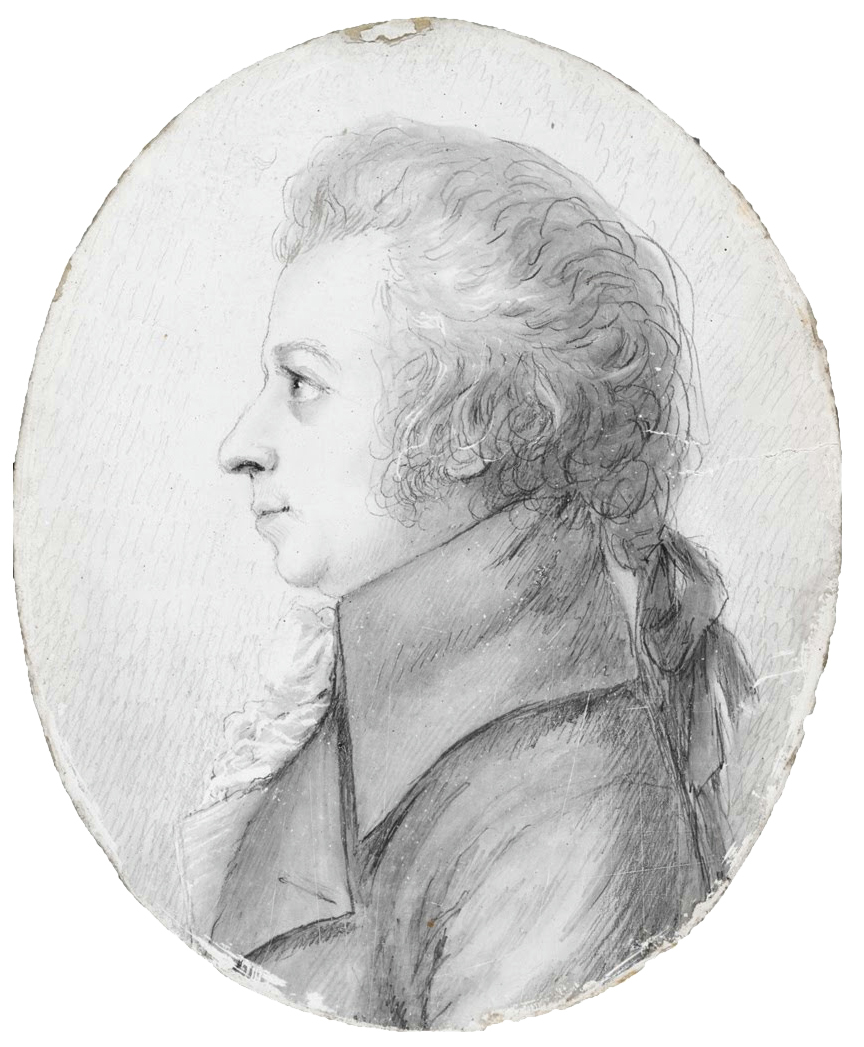
Stock's 1789 miniature of Mozart

The four Horn Concertos by Wolfgang Amadeus Mozart were written for his friend Joseph Leutgeb, whom he had known since childhood. Leutgeb was a skilled player, and the works are difficult to perform on the natural horn of the period, requiring lip trills, much hand-stopping, and rapid tonguing.

== Concertos ==
- Horn Concerto No. 1 in D major, K. 412 (1791, unfinished at Mozart's death)
- Horn Concerto No. 2 in E♭ major, K. 417 (1783)
- Horn Concerto No. 3 in E♭ major, K. 447 (c. 1784–87)
- Horn Concerto No. 4 in E♭ major, K. 495 (1786)

== Fragmentary and incomplete works ==
In addition to the four works listed above, there are two incomplete concerto movements, K. 370b and the Concert Rondo, K. 371, both from 1781 and both in E♭ major, and a 91-bar fragment of the first movement for a concerto in E major (K. 494a), written in 1785 or 1786.

== Discography ==
Given the duration of the concertos (no more than 20 minutes each) it is quite common to find these horn concertos on the same CD, or in boxed sets of Mozart's concertos for wind instruments or even all his concertos. The Naxos Records CD Complete Works for Horn & Orchestra includes, besides the concertos, three rondos for horn and orchestra completed by musicologists.
