= Horn Concerto No. 2 (Mozart) =

1783 horn concerto by W. A. Mozart

- by W. A. Mozart
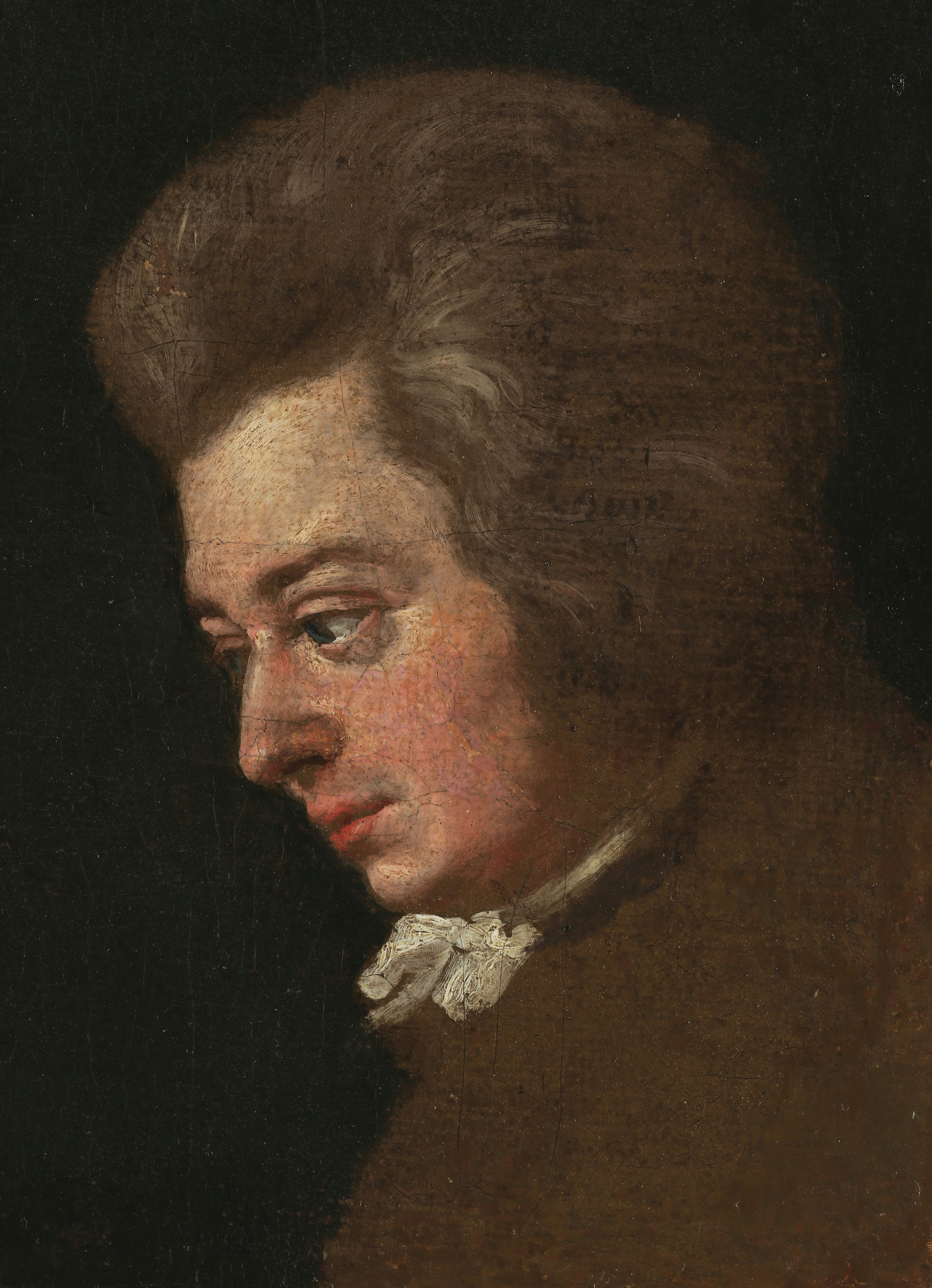
- The composer in 1782
- Key: E♭ major
- Catalogue: K. 417
- Composed: 1783
- Dedication: Joseph Leutgeb
- Movements: 3
- Scoring: Solo horn and orchestra

Wolfgang Amadeus Mozart's Horn Concerto No. 2 in E♭ major, K. 417, was completed in 1783.

The concerto is scored for solo horn and an orchestra of two oboes, two horns, and strings. This is one of two horn concertos of Mozart to omit bassoons. It is also one of Mozart's two horn concertos to have ripieno horns (horns included in the orchestra besides the soloist), though in contrast to Horn Concerto No. 4, K. 495, the solo horn in this one does not duplicate the first ripieno horn's part in the tutti passages.

Mozart's good-natured ribbing of his friend, hornist Joseph Leutgeb for whom this and other works were written, is evident in the manuscript's inscription "W. A. Mozart took pity on Leitgeb, ass, ox and fool in Vienna on 27 May 1783."

== Structure ==
The work is in three movements:

1. Allegro maestoso
2. Andante (B♭ major)
3. Rondo (Più allegro) 6/8

== Discography ==
Given its duration (no more than 20 minutes), the concerto is often grouped with Mozart's other three horn concertos. The foremost example is Dennis Brain's November 1953 recording of the four horn concertos on EMI with the Philharmonia Orchestra conducted by Herbert von Karajan.

- 2018: Javier Bonet-Manrique (horn); Munich Radio Orchestra, Hermann Baumann (conductor), ARSIS. A recording with all the Mozart horn concertos including the Rondo for Horn, K. 371, and the Horn Quintet, K. 407.
