= Horn Concerto No. 4 =

1786 composition by W. A. Mozart

- by W. A. Mozart
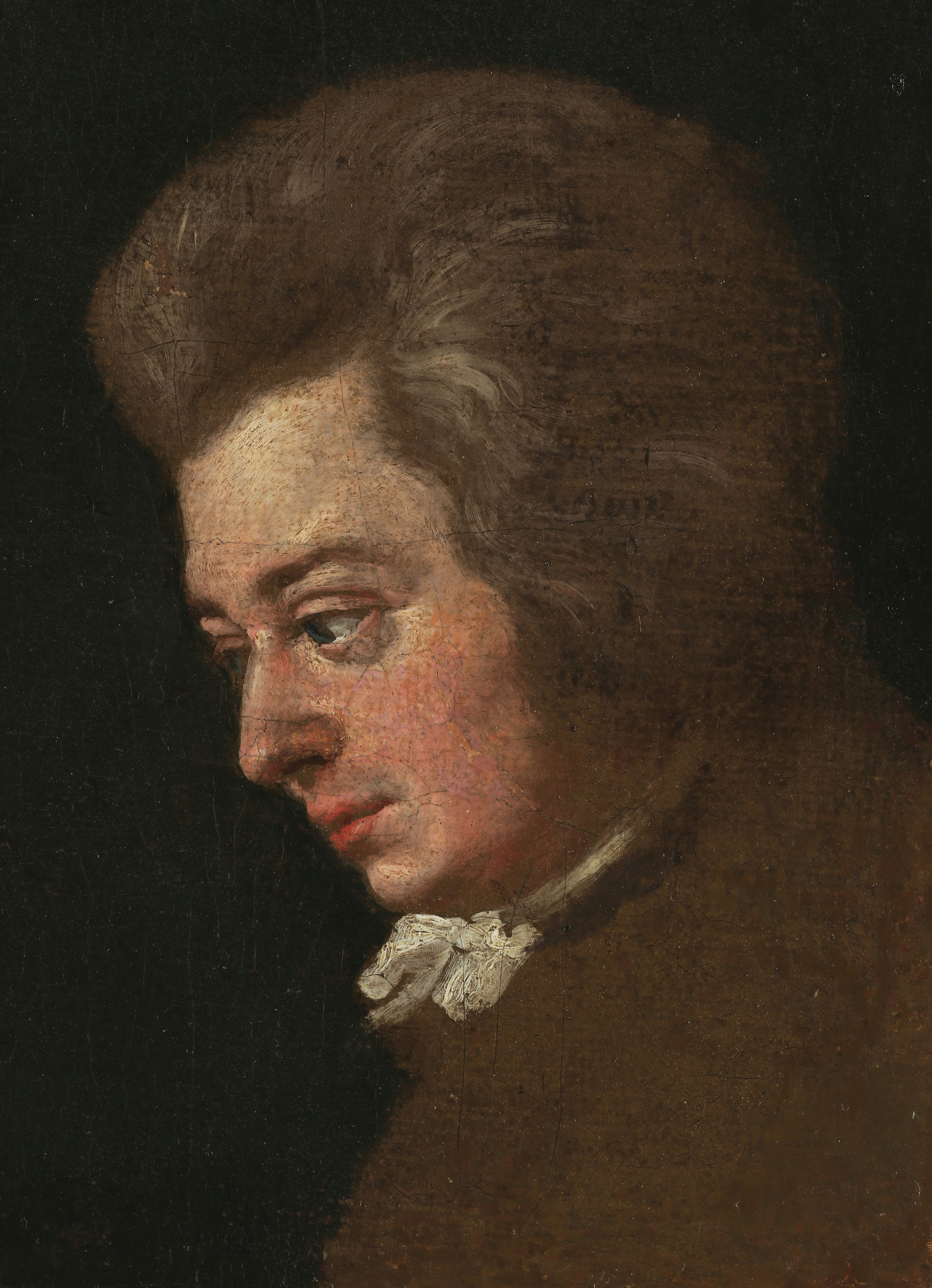
- The composer in 1782
- Key: E♭ major
- Catalogue: K. 495
- Composed: 1786
- Dedication: Joseph Leutgeb
- Duration: 16–18 minutes
- Movements: 3
- Scoring: Solo horn and orchestra

Wolfgang Amadeus Mozart's Horn Concerto No. 4 in E♭ major, K. 495 was completed in 1786.

== Structure ==
The work is in three movements:

1. Allegro maestoso
2. Romance (Andante cantabile) (B♭ major)
3. Rondo (Allegro vivace) 6/8

A typical performance duration of the concerto takes 16–18 minutes.

The manuscript, written in red, green, blue, and black ink, has been suggested as a jocular attempt to rattle the intended performer, Mozart's friend Joseph Leutgeb. However, recently it was suggested that the multicolored score may also be a kind of "color code".

The last movement is a "quite obvious" example of the hunt topic, "in which the intervallic construction, featuring prominent tonic and dominant triads in the main melody, was to some degree dictated by the capability of the natural horn, and so was more closely allied with the original 'pure' characteristics of the 'chassé' as an open-air hunting call."

This concerto is one of Mozart's two horn concerti to have ripieno horns (horns included in the orchestra besides the soloist), though, in contrast to the Horn Concerto No. 2, K. 417, the solo horn in this one duplicates the first ripieno horn's part in the tutti passages.

== Discography ==
Given its duration (no more than 20 minutes), it is quite common to find this Horn Concerto with Mozart's other three.

=== Discography on modern instruments ===
- 1954: Dennis Brain (horn); Philharmonia Orchestra, Herbert von Karajan (conductor), EMI
- 1961: Alan Civil (horn); Philharmonia Orchestra, Otto Klemperer (conductor), EMI
- 1964: Barry Tuckwell (horn); London Symphony Orchestra, Peter Maag (conductor), Decca
- 1970: Gerd Seifert (horn); Berlin Philharmonic, Herbert von Karajan (conductor), Deutsche Grammophon
- 1972: Alan Civil (horn); Academy of St Martin in the Fields, Sir Neville Marriner (conductor), Philips
- 1975: Peter Damm (horn); Academy of St Martin in the Fields, Sir Neville Marriner (conductor), Philips
- 1980: Günter Högner (horn); Vienna Philharmonic, Karl Böhm (conductor), Deutsche Grammophon
- 1984: Barry Tuckwell (horn & conductor); English Chamber Orchestra, Decca
- 1985: Hermann Baumann (horn); Saint Paul Chamber Orchestra, Pinchas Zukerman (conductor), Philips
- 1985: Michael Thompson (horn); Philharmonia Orchestra, Christopher Warren-Green (conductor), Nimbus
- 1985: Francis Orval (horn); Brussels Festival Orchestra, Robert Janssens (conductor), Marcophon
- 1987: Dale Clevenger (horn); Franz Liszt Chamber Orchestra, János Rolla (conductor), Sony
- 1987: Radovan Vlatković (horn); English Chamber Orchestra, Jeffrey Tate (conductor), Warner
- 1988: David Jolley (horn); Orpheus Chamber Orchestra, Deutsche Grammophon
- 1993: Frank Lloyd (horn); Northern Sinfonia, Richard Hickox (conductor), Chandos
- 1996: Luc Bergé (horn); Prima la Musica, Dirk Vermeulen (conductor), Eufoda
- 1997: David Pyatt (horn); Academy of St Martin in the Fields, Sir Neville Marriner (conductor), Warner
- 2006: Johannes Hinterholzer (horn); Mozarteum Orchestra Salzburg, Ivor Bolton (conductor), Oehms
- 2011: Alessio Allegrini (horn); Orchestra Mozart, Claudio Abbado (conductor), Deutsche Grammophon
- 2018: Javier Bonet-Manrique (horn); Munich Radio Orchestra, Hermann Baumann (conductor), ARSIS

=== Discography on period instruments ===
- 1974: Hermann Baumann (natural horn); Concentus Musicus Wien, Nikolaus Harnoncourt (conductor), Teldec
- 1987: Anthony Halstead (natural horn); Hanover Band, Roy Goodman (conductor), Nimbus
- 1990: Timothy Brown (natural horn); Orchestra of the Age of Enlightenment, Sigiswald Kuijken (conductor), Erato
- 1993: Ab Koster (natural horn); Tafelmusik, Bruno Weil (conductor), Sony
- 1994: Anthony Halstead (natural horn); Academy of Ancient Music, Christopher Hogwood (conductor), L'oiseau lyre
- 2007: Teunis van der Zwart (natural horn); Freiburger Barockorchester, Gottfried von der Goltz, (conductor), Harmonia Mundi
- 2007: Paul Van Zelm (natural horn); Combattimento Consort Amsterdam, Jan Willem De Vriend, (conductor), Etcetera
- 2013: Roger Montgomery (natural horn); Orchestra of the Age of Enlightenment, Margaret Faultless (concert master/conductor), Signum
- 2015: Pip Eastop (natural horn); The Hanover Band, Anthony Halstead (conductor), Hyperion

In 1963 Flanders and Swann set the Rondo movement to words for their song "Ill Wind" from the album At the Drop of Another Hat. The Swingle Singers's cover of the Rondo movement was used in the 2005 film Wedding Crashers.
