= Essay for Orchestra =

Orchestral composition by Samuel Barber

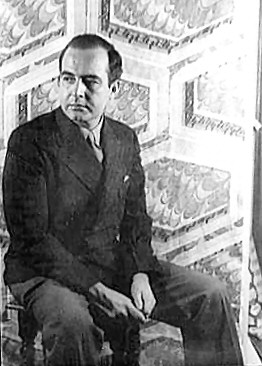
Samuel Barber in 1944

Samuel Barber's Essay for Orchestra, Op. 12, completed in the first half of 1938, is an orchestral work in one movement. It was given its first performance by Arturo Toscanini with the NBC Symphony Orchestra on November 5, 1938 in New York in a radio broadcast concert in which the composer's Adagio for Strings saw its first performance. It lasts around 8 minutes and is dedicated "To C.E." The essay is now known as the First Essay for Orchestra after Barber wrote his Second Essay for Orchestra in 1942. He also wrote a Third Essay in 1978.

Barber visited Toscanini several times in 1933 at his villa on Isola di San Giovanni in Lago Maggiore, and the world-famous conductor told Barber that he would like to perform one of his works. This was a great honor for the young composer, particularly because Toscanini rarely performed works by contemporary or American composers. Barber presented his work to Toscanini in the spring of 1938, together with the score of the Adagio for Strings.

The First Essay resembles but is not equivalent to a first movement of a symphony.

Besides the world premiere in 1938, Toscanini also performed the music on January 24, 1942, in a special War Bonds performance that was preserved on transcription discs; Toscanini never made a commercial recording of the music. Eugene Ormandy and the Philadelphia Orchestra recorded the music in 1942 for RCA Victor in the Academy of Music. Neeme Järvi with the Detroit Symphony Orchestra, Leonard Slatkin with the St. Louis Symphony Orchestra, and Daniel Kawka with the Orchestra Sinfonica Nazionale della RAI have all recorded all three of Barber's Essays.
