= Third Essay for Orchestra (Barber) =

Orchestral work by Samuel Barber

The Third Essay for Orchestra, Op. 47, is a short orchestral work composed by Samuel Barber in 1978. The score is dedicated to Audrey Sheldon.

== History ==
Barber's Third Essay for Orchestra was the eventual product of a suggestion made in the spring of 1976 by Eugene Ormandy, who had been approached by an anonymous patron offering a commission of $75,000 from the Merlin Foundation for a large-scale work to be premiered by the Philadelphia Orchestra, as well as to support recordings of works of Barber’s choice. The mysterious benefactor eventually was revealed to be Audrey Sheldon Poon, an American socialite, daughter of Huntington D. Sheldon and Magda Merck, the youngest daughter of George Merck, founder of the pharmaceutical firm Merck & Co. Although a contract was signed, a series of misunderstandings between the parties involved resulted in protracted and ultimately fruitless negotiations with the Philadelphia Orchestra Association, who could not accept some of the conditions tied to the contribution. While it is not certain whether it was Barber or his patroness who terminated the arrangement, the Merlin Foundation's cheque was returned. By this time divorced from Mr. Poon and using her maiden name, Audrey Sheldon renewed the commission for an orchestral work, this time intended for the New York Philharmonic, presenting Barber with $60,000.

In March 1978, the announcement for the opening concert of the next season of the New York Philharmonic gives the title of Barber's new work as The Ambiguities (after Melville). A little more than a month later, on April 21, 1978, Audrey Sheldon died of a drug overdose, which was ruled a suicide. Barber composed the Essay in Italy during the following summer, completing the score in the third week of August, less than a month before it was premiered on September 14, 1978, in Avery Fisher Hall, by the New York Philharmonic, conducted by Zubin Mehta in his debut as music director. After hearing the work performed, Barber was dissatisfied with what he felt was a too-abrupt ending, which he extended somewhat in revision. The score, which was published only in 1991, a decade after the composer's death, bears a dedication to Audrey Sheldon.

== Instrumentation ==
The Third Essay for Orchestra is scored for a large orchestra consisting of piccolo, two flutes, two oboes, English horn, E♭ clarinet, two clarinets in B♭, bass clarinet, two bassoons, contrabassoon, four horns, three trumpets, euphonium, three trombones, tuba, two harps, piano, two timpanists (each with four drums); an exceptionally large percussion section, including small and large tam-tams, bass drum, metal sheet, marimba, xylophone, cymbal, high and low snare drums, wood block, bells, antique cymbal, and bongos, none of which are listed on the preface page of the published score; and strings.

== Analysis ==
According to the composer, this essay is absolutely abstract, and more essentially dramatic and less lyric in character than the first two essays, although the central section includes several lyric themes. The introductory twenty-seven bars are for just the percussion with piano and harps, and the thematic nature of the first section is dictated by the percussion. The introductory material serves as a point of reference that holds together the various themes that follow, with the paramount objective of creating unity.

== Discography ==
- John Corigliano: Concerto for Clarinet and Orchestra. Samuel Barber: Third Essay for Orchestra, Op. 47. Stanley Drucker, clarinet; New York Philharmonic; Zubin Mehta, cond. Recorded in Avery Fisher Hall, New York. LP recording, 1 sound disc: analog, 33⅓ rpm, stereo, 12 in. New World Records NW 309. Recorded Anthology of American Music. New York: New World Records, 1981. Reissued on CD, 1 sound disc: digital, stereo, 4¾ in. New World Records NW 309-2. New York, NY: New World Records, 1987.
- Music of Samuel Barber. Overture to The School for Scandal, Op. 5; Adagio for Strings, Op. 11; First Essay for Orchestra, Op. 12; Second Essay, Op. 17; Third Essay, Op. 47; Medea's Dance of Vengeance, Op. 23a. Saint Louis Symphony Orchestra; Leonard Slatkin, cond. Recorded May 3, 1988, at Powell Hall, St. Louis. Missouri. CD recording, 1 audio disc: digital, stereo, 4¾ in. EMI CDC 7 49463 2. Hayes Middlesex, England: EMI Records Ltd., 1989.
- Samuel Barber: Fadograph of a Yestern Scene; Medea (Suite, 1947); Third Essay. New Zealand Symphony Orchestra; Andrew Schenck, cond. Recorded October 1989 at Symphony House, Wellington, New Zealand. CD recording, 1 audio disc: digital, stereo, 4¾ in. Koch International Classics 3-7010-2. Westbury, NY: Koch International, 1990.
- Samuel Barber. Three Essays for Orchestra; Excerpts from Vanessa; Music for a Scene from Shelley; Medea's Meditation and Dance of Vengeance. Detroit Symphony Orchestra; Neeme Järvi, conductor. Recorded in Detroit Symphony Orchestra Hall, 8–9 Nov. 1991 (Three Essays), 24–25 April 1993 (Vanessa selections and Music for a Scene from Shelley), and 16 January 1994 (Medea's Meditation and Dance of Vengeance). CD recording, 1 audio disc: digital, 4¾ in. Chandos CHAN 9908. Colchester, Essex, England: Chandos, 2001.
- Samuel Barber: Knoxville: Summer of 1915; Essays for Orchestra Nos. 2 and 3; Toccata Festiva. Karina Gauvin, soprano; Thomas Trotter, organ; Royal Scottish National Orchestra; Marin Alsop, cond. Recorded October 27, 2002 (Knoxville: Summer of 1915); May 3, 1999 (Second Essay); and March 18, 2001 (Third Essay) at Henry Wood Hall, Glasgow; and on June 11, 2002 (Toccata Festiva), at Paisley Abbey, Glasgow. CD recording, 1 audio disc: digital, stereo, 4¾ in. Naxos 8559134. American Classics. [Franklin, Tennessee]: Naxos Records, 2004.
- Samuel Barber: Piano Concerto; Three Essays. Giampaolo Nuti, piano; Orchestra Sinfonica Nazionale della RAI; Daniel Kawka, cond. Recorded in the Auditorio RAI Torino. CD recording, 1 audio disc: digital, stereo, 4¾ in. Stradivarius STR-33814. Release Date: 02/08/2011.
