= David Pyatt =

British hornist (born 1973)

- Born: David John Pyatt; 26 September 1973 (age 52); Watford, England
- Genres: Classical
- Instrument: French horn

David John Pyatt (born 26 September 1973) is a horn player from Watford, England. In 1988, aged 14, he became the then youngest winner of the BBC Young Musician of the Year competition. In 1996 Gramophone Magazine announced David Pyatt as their Young Artist of the Year. Pyatt studied at Watford Grammar School for Boys, followed by Selwyn College, Cambridge.

His subsequent solo career saw his debut at the BBC Proms in 1993 performing Strauss' Second Horn Concerto. In 2004, he played Strauss' First Horn Concerto at the Last Night of The Proms, and also appeared at the Edinburgh Festival playing Weber's Concertino for Horn and Orchestra.

Pyatt was Principal Horn of the London Symphony Orchestra from the 1998/9 season.

In 2013, Pyatt joined the London Philharmonic Orchestra as joint principal. In 2019, he was appointed principal horn of the Orchestra of the Royal Opera House, Covent Garden.

Pyatt is Patron of Watford Philharmonic, as he grew up and still lives, in the area.
