= Horn Concerto No. 3 =

1787 composition by W. A. Mozart

- by W. A. Mozart
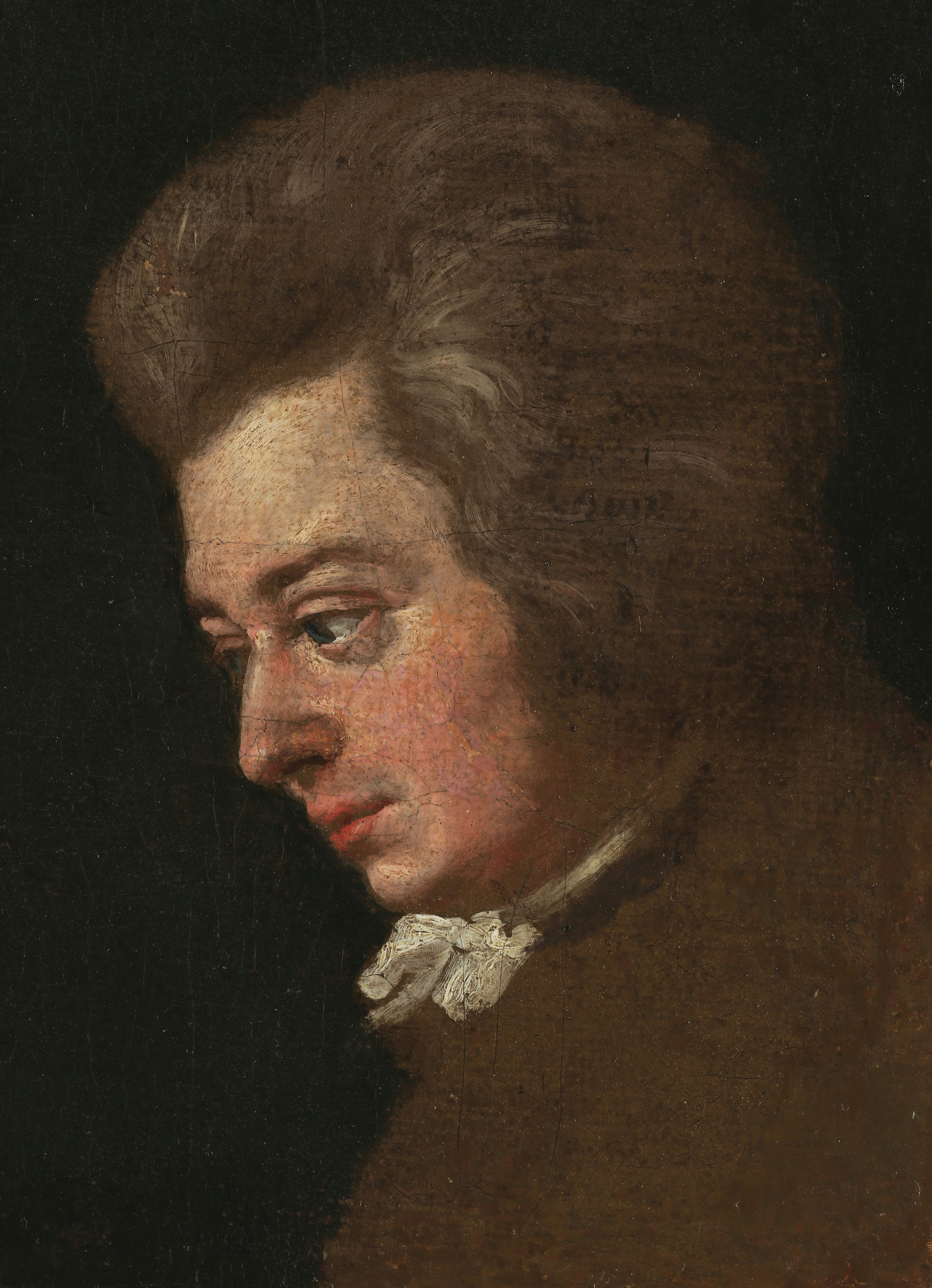
- The composer in 1782
- Key: E♭ major
- Catalogue: K. 447
- Composed: 1784–1787
- Dedication: Joseph Leutgeb
- Movements: 3
- Scoring: Solo horn and orchestra

Wolfgang Amadeus Mozart's Horn Concerto No. 3 in E♭ major, K. 447, was completed between 1784 and 1787 in Vienna.

== Background ==
The composition was written as a friendly gesture for the hornist Joseph Leutgeb (his name is mentioned a few times in the score), and Mozart probably did not consider it as particularly important, since he failed to enter it to the autograph catalogue of his works. The autograph score remains well preserved; it is stored in the British Library in London. The Romance is given an individual header in the autograph, suggesting that it was the first movement to be composed and Mozart later expanded the work into a full concerto by adding the outer movements. This theory is supported by the fact that the foliation numbers on the autograph restart at the slow movement.

Michael Haydn's Romance for horn quintet in A♭ major (MH 806) is very similar to the Romance from Mozart's Horn Concerto No. 3. Karsten Nottelmann has speculated that Leutgeb had other composers revise and make corrections to his own works, and that this explains the two versions of the Romance as well as the two versions of the Rondo of Mozart's Horn Concerto No. 1 (one a draft by Mozart, the other a complete version by Franz Xaver Süssmayr): they would be different composers' edits to a Leutgeb original.

== Instrumentation ==
In addition to the solo horn (in E♭), the concerto is scored for 2 clarinets in B♭ (unlike the oboes used in the other horn concertos), 2 bassoons, and strings.

== Form ==
The work is in three movements:

1. Allegro (4/4)
2. Romance (Larghetto) (A♭ major)
3. Allegro (6/8)

This concerto "has clarinets besides bassoons and string for accompaniment. They bring warmth and light colouring to this most attractive work, and in spite of unadventurous support they partner the bassoons in many typical phrases."

The main melody of the third movement is reminiscent of the theme from the rondo of Mozart's Piano Concerto No. 22 written in 1785.

== Discography ==
Given its duration (about 15 minutes), the Concerto is typically grouped with Mozart's other three for the instrument, in boxed sets of Mozart's concerti for wind instruments or even all his concerti.

One example is Dennis Brain's November 1953 recording of the four horn concertos on EMI with the Philharmonia Orchestra conducted by Herbert von Karajan.

The Naxos Records CD Complete Works for Horn & Orchestra includes, besides the concerti, three rondos for horn and orchestra completed by musicologists.

William Purvis has recorded No. 3 along with No. 2, K. 417, with the Orpheus Chamber Orchestra for Deutsche Grammophon, on a disc which also includes Mozart's Oboe Concerto, K. 314, and Bassoon Concerto, K. 191. Like the other two soloists, Purvis improvised his own cadenza for the two horn concerti on the disc.

Fred Rizner has recorded this concerto together with K. 495 with the English Chamber Orchestra conducted by José Luis García Asensio on a Summit disc which also includes the Clarinet Concerto, K. 622 (with clarinetist Joaquin Valdepeñas).

2018: Javier Bonet (horn); Munich Radio Orchestra, Hermann Baumann (conductor), ARSIS. A recording with all the Mozart horn concertos including the Rondo K. 371 and the Horn Quintet, K. 407.
