= Piano Concerto No. 9 (Mozart) =

1777 composition by W. A. Mozart

- Jeunehomme
- by Wolfgang Amadeus Mozart
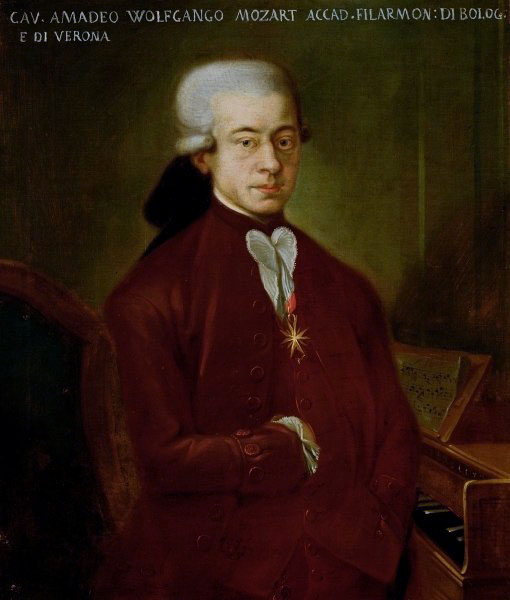
- 1777 portrait of Mozart with the Order of the Golden Spur
- Other name: Jenamy
- Key: E♭ major
- Catalogue: K. 271
- Genre: Concerto
- Style: Classical period
- Composed: 1777
- Movements: Three (Allegro, Andantino, Rondo, Presto)
- Scoring: Piano; orchestra

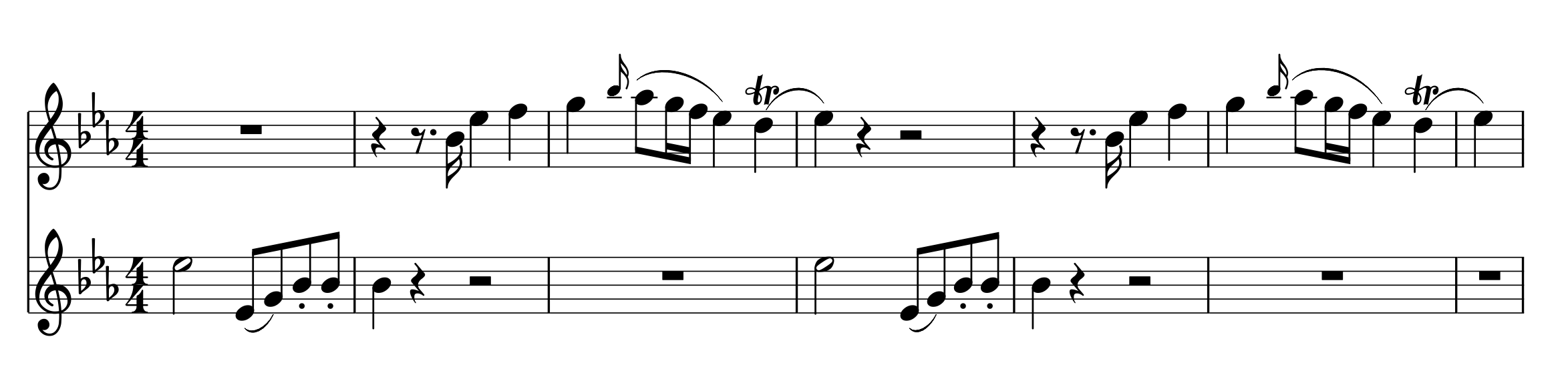
The opening measures of the first movement. The lower stave is the orchestral part; the upper stave is the right hand of the piano part.

Wolfgang Amadeus Mozart's Piano Concerto No. 9 in E♭ major, K. 271, known as the Jeunehomme or Jenamy concerto was written in Salzburg in 1777 when the composer was 21 years old.

== Composition ==
Mozart completed the concerto in January 1777, nine months after his Piano Concerto No. 8 in C major and with few significant compositions in the intervening period. He composed the work for Victoire Jenamy (1749–1812), the daughter of Jean-Georges Noverre and a proficient pianist. Mozart performed the concerto at a private concert on 4 October 1777. Jenamy may have premiered the work earlier.

== Structure ==
The work is scored for solo piano, 2 oboes, 2 natural horns (in E♭), and strings. It consists of three movements:

1. Allegro, in time
2. Andantino, in C minor and 3/4 time
3. Rondeau (Presto – Cantabile 3/4 – Tempo primo)

=== I. Allegro ===
Unusually for the time, the first movement opens with interventions by the soloist, anticipating Beethoven's Fourth and Fifth Concertos. As Cuthbert Girdlestone (1964) notes, its departures from convention do not end with this early solo entrance but continue in the style of dialogue between piano and orchestra in the rest of the movement.

Mozart wrote two cadenzas for this and the subsequent movement.

=== II. Andantino ===
The second movement is written in the relative minor key. In only five of Mozart's piano concertos is the second movement in a minor key (K. 41, K. 271, K. 456, K. 482, and K. 488. K. 41 is an arrangement).

=== III. Rondeau ===
The third movement, which opens with the solo piano, is in a rondo form on a large scale. It is interrupted by a slow minuet section in the subdominant key of A♭ major (a procedure Mozart would repeat with his 22nd concerto, 1785, also in the key of E♭ major). The work ends in the original tempo.

== Reception ==
The work is highly regarded by critics. Charles Rosen has called it "perhaps the first unequivocal masterpiece [of the] classical style." Alfred Brendel has called it "one of the greatest wonders of the world". Alfred Einstein dubbed it "Mozart's Eroica". Cuthbert Girdlestone wrote that the slow movement, while a great leap forward for Mozart, was still somewhat limited and the work as a whole was not equal to the piano concertos from the composer's peak in Vienna from 1784 to 1787, nor equal to his best compositions overall. More recently, the Mozart scholar Simon P. Keefe has summed up the concerto as "characterized by a conciseness of thematic development, a depth of expression (in the Andantino in particular) and a level of exuberant virtuosity (especially in the finale) that surpasses anything witnessed in his preceding piano concertos."

== Name ==
The work has long been known as the Jeunehomme Concerto. Théodore de Wyzéwa and Georges de Saint-Foix claimed that Mozart wrote the piece for an unnamed French pianist 'Jeunehomme' (French for "young man", but also a common French surname) visiting Salzburg. However, Michael Lorenz demonstrated in 2004 that the dedicatee was actually Victoire Jenamy (1749–1812), a French virtuoso who was a daughter of one of Mozart's friends, the dancer Jean-Georges Noverre. Mozart became familiar with Jenamy and her reputedly splendid playing when she performed in Salzburg in December 1776. Part of the confusion of names was due to the fact that in their letters Mozart and his father variously refer to her as "the jenomy", "Madame jenomè" and "Madame genomai". In addition, Wyzéwa and Saint Foix had to base their work on prior transcriptions of Mozart's letters, as they were denied access to the originals by a difficult and unco-operative archivist. However, they also changed her title from Madame (indicating that she was married) to Mademoiselle (indicating that she was not). The reasons for this remain a mystery.

== Notes ==
=== Sources ===
- Girdlestone, Cuthbert (1948). Mozart's Piano Concertos. London: Cassell. OCLC 247427085.
- Girdlestone, Cuthbert (1964). Mozart and His Piano Concertos. Dover books on music (2nd, unabridged, reprint ed.). New York: Dover Publication.
- Keefe, Simon P. (4 January 2006). Eisen, Cliff; Keefe, Simon P. (eds.). The Cambridge Mozart Encyclopedia (1st ed.). Cambridge University Press. doi:10.1017/cbo9780511481383. ISBN 978-0-521-85659-1.
- Rosen, Charles (1976). The Classical Style: Haydn, Mozart, Beethoven (revised ed.). London: Faber & Faber. ISBN 0571049052.
- Steinberg, Michael (1998). The Concerto: A Listener's Guide. New York: Oxford University Press. ISBN 019802634X.
