= Piano Concerto No. 22 (Mozart) =

1785 composition by W. A. Mozart

- by W. A. Mozart
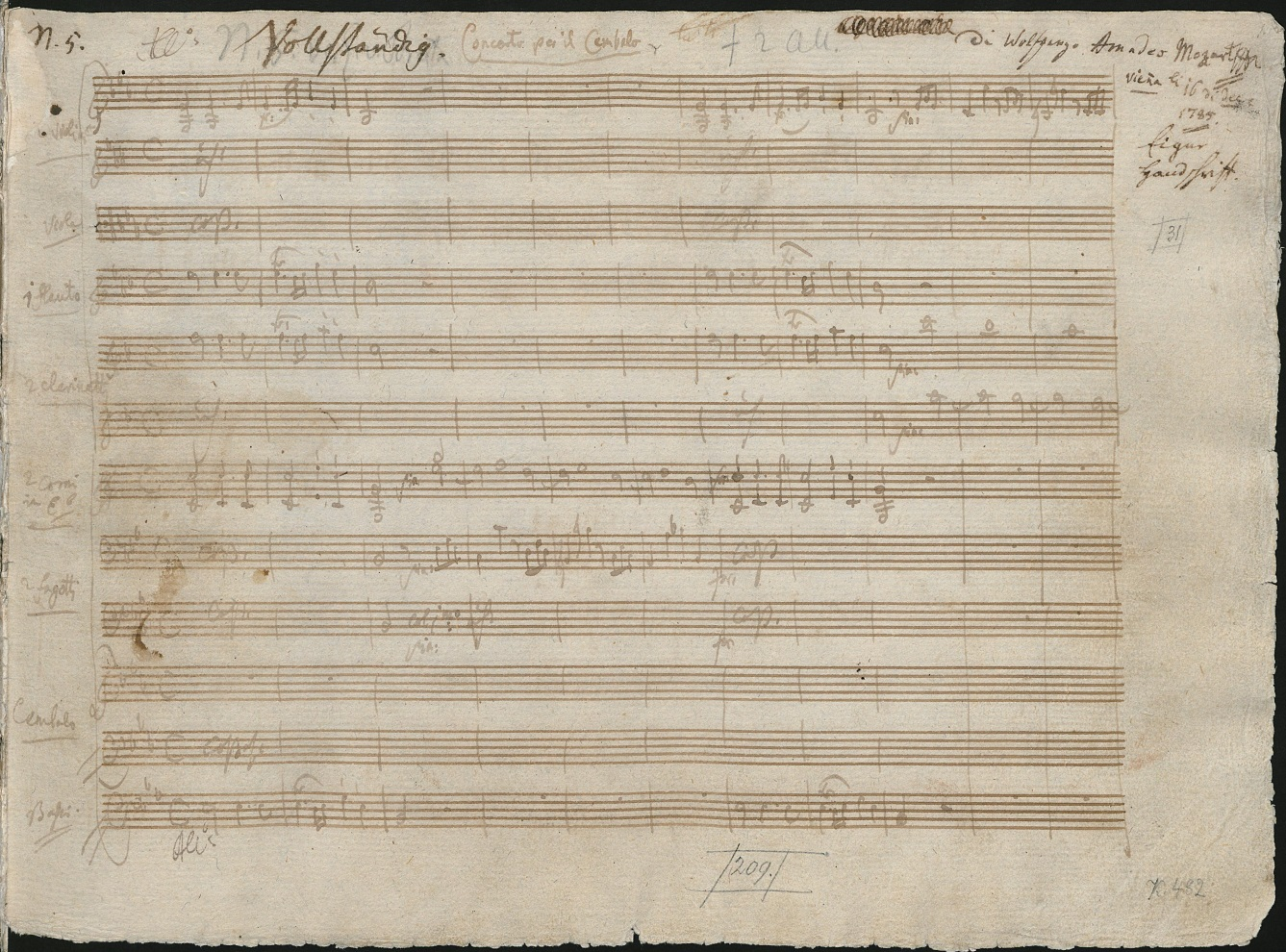
- First page of the autograph manuscript
- Key: E♭ major
- Catalogue: K. 482
- Genre: Concerto
- Style: Classical period
- Composed: December 1785
- Movements: Three (Allegro, Andante, Allegro)

The Piano Concerto No. 22 in E♭ major, K. 482, is a work for piano, or fortepiano, and orchestra by Wolfgang Amadeus Mozart, composed in December 1785.

This is the first piano concerto of Mozart's to include clarinets in its scoring. It is also scored for solo piano, flute, two clarinets (in B♭), two bassoons, two horns and two trumpets (silent in Andante) in E♭, timpani (in E♭ and B♭, silent in Andante), and strings.

== Structure and analysis ==
The concerto is in the following three movements:

1. Allegro, 4/4
2. Andante (variations) in C minor, 3/8
3. Allegro, 6/8

At about 35 minutes, it is one of Mozart's longest concertos.

=== I. Allegro ===
In his book on the piano concertos, Cuthbert Girdlestone pointed out the similarity between the opening of this movement and that of Mozart's Symphony No. 1, K. 16, written when he was eight years old. This juvenile work was composed for an orchestra of oboes, horns and strings. A comparison illustrates how far Mozart had developed in the intervening 20 years:

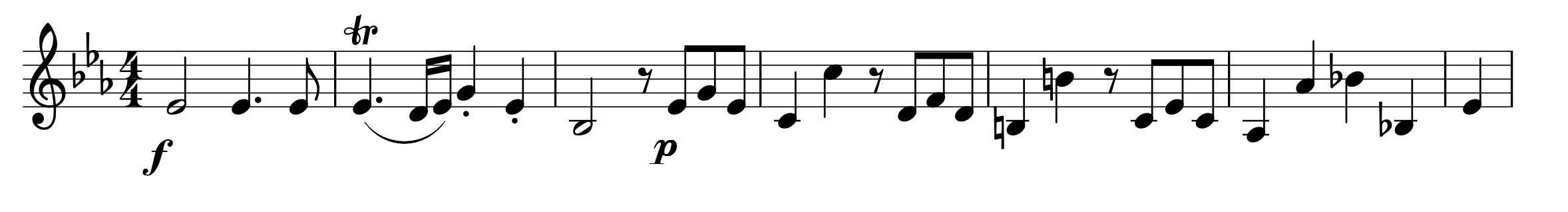
The principal theme of the first movement. The forte section is played tutti; the piano section is played the first time by the bassoons, and upon repeat by the violins. At no point in the movement does the soloist carry any part of the principal theme.

Both works start with "a vigorous and rhythmical attack and a light answer, quiet and tuneful". In the earlier work, the whole ensemble plays question and answer phrases and repeats them in their entirety:

Symphony No. 1 opening bars

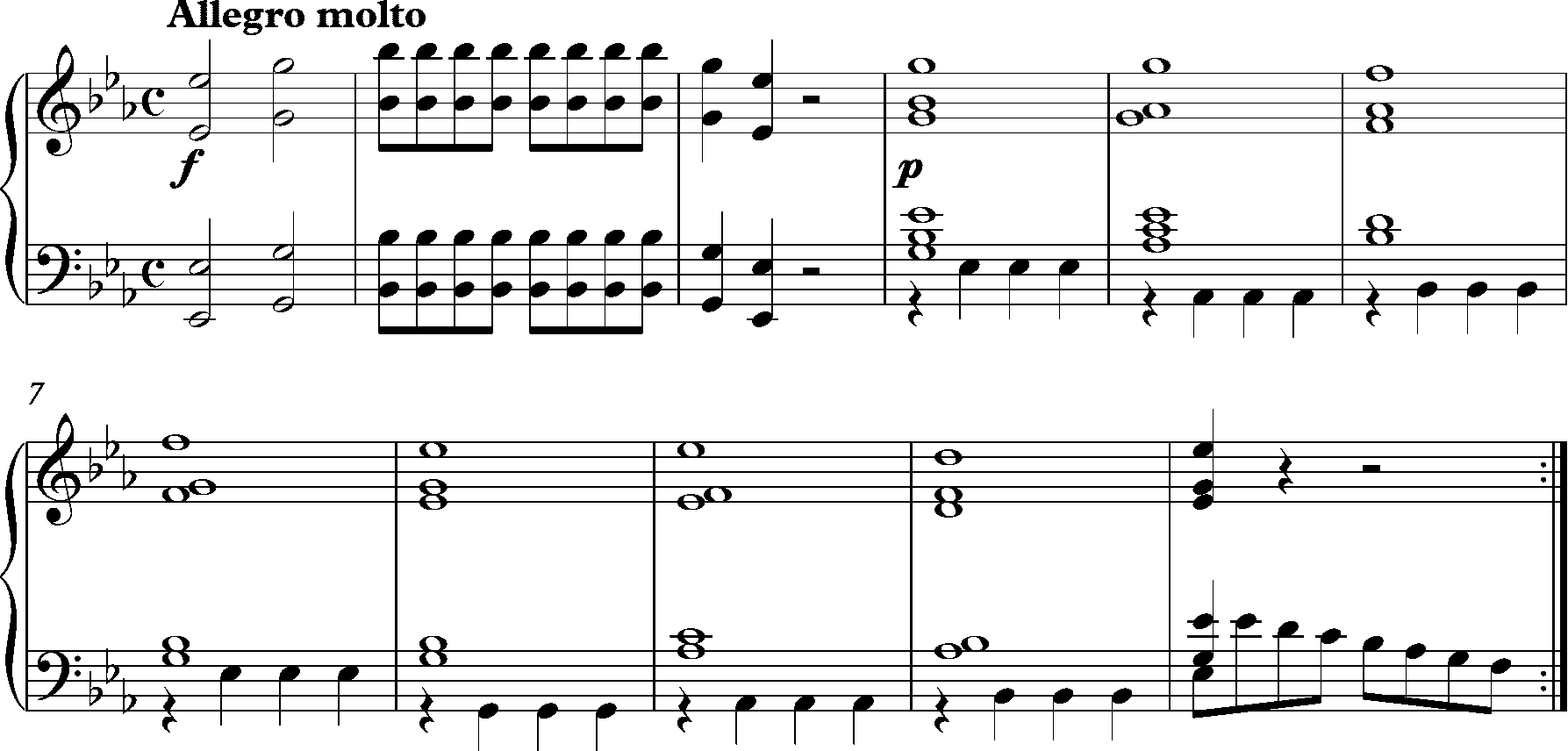
Symphony No. 1 opening bars

The orchestration of the piano concerto is subtler and more differentiated. In the early symphony, the answering phrase consisted of block harmonies, but in the concerto it opens out into flowing lines of counterpoint, initially featuring just two horns and a bassoon:

Piano Concerto K. 482 opening

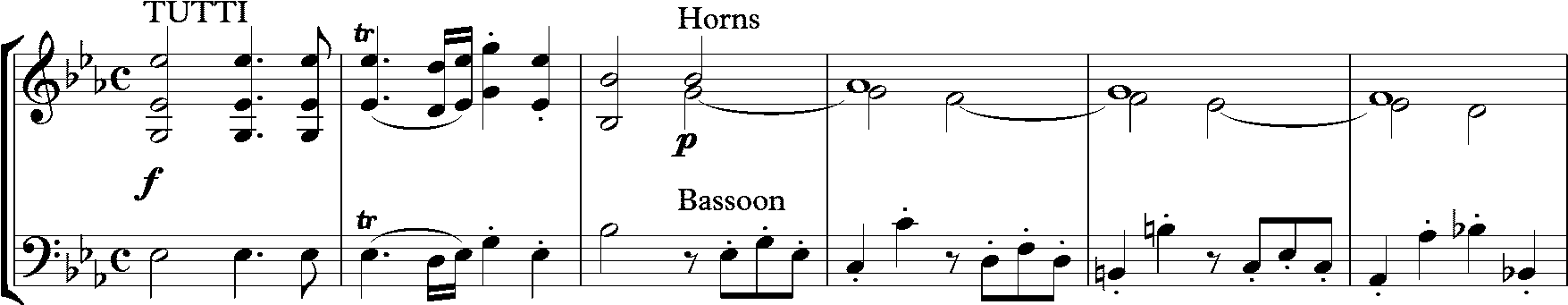
Piano Concerto K. 482, first movement bars 1–6

On repeating this, a different group of instruments plays the answering phrase, with "the unusual sound of the violins providing the bass for the solo clarinets":

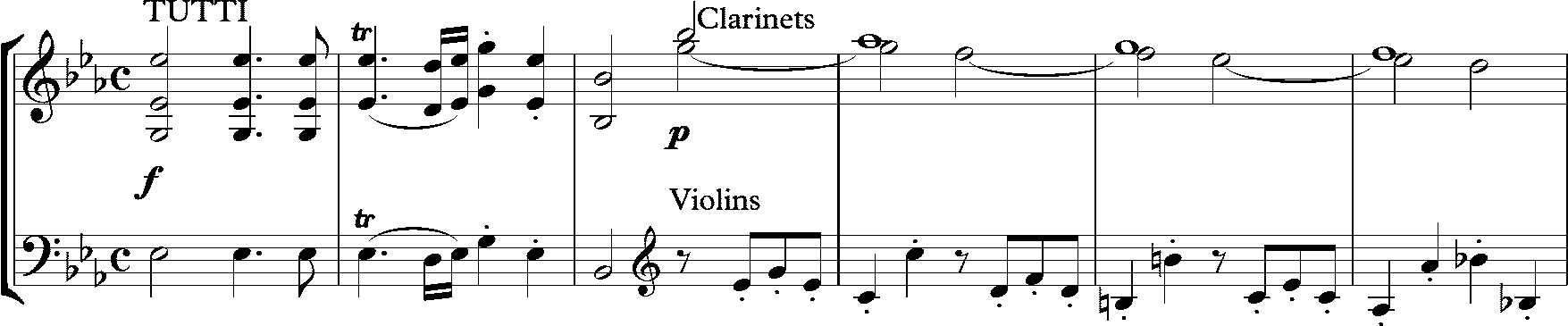
Piano Concerto K. 482, first movement bars 7–12

Roger Kamien and Naphtali Wagner have analysed in detail Mozart's use of bridge themes in the exposition of the concerto's first movement. Simon Keefe has analysed the character of the dialogue between the soloist and the orchestra in the concerto's first movement.

=== II. Andante ===
The slow second movement is a theme and variations in C minor that recalls similar slow C minor movements in other Mozart E♭ major concertos such as K. 271 and K. 364. Mozart's father, in a famous letter to Maria ("Nannerl"), expressed surprise that a call was made for the slow movement ("a rather unusual occurrence!") to be repeated.

=== III. Allegro ===
In the rondo finale, the main theme resembles that of Mozart's third horn concerto (K. 447). Adena Portowitz has noted similar features between the finale of the K. 271 and K. 482 concerti. In another similarity to K. 271, the finale is interrupted by a lengthy and slow minuet episode before returning to the main theme for a lively finish (also recalling Count Almaviva's adagio pleadings for forgiveness leading to a buffa conclusion in Le nozze di Figaro, a work that Mozart was working on at this time). The Andantino episode of K. 482 is melodically simpler than the parallel episode in K. 271, at least on paper, and less complex in form as well, consisting of two eight-bar phrases played by the orchestra and repeated with the solo, followed by a transition back to the rondo theme. (The Menuetto episode of K. 271, while often described as a set of variations, is actually in a more elaborate rounded binary form with both parts repeated, again followed by a transition back to the main rondo theme.) M.S. Cole has noted that the K. 482's finale marks Mozart's last use of potpourri in his compositions.

This movement was featured in the film Amadeus.
