= Francis Orval =

American classical horn player (born 1944)

Francis Orval (born 1944, in Liège) is an American classical horn player.

== Career ==
Orval has recorded albums with artists such as Arthur Grumiaux, Gyorgy Sebok, and Jean-Claude Vanden Eynden. He has been featured on the cover of Horn Society magazine. He studied music at the Liege Conservatory, where he has also taught for many years. By the age of 16, he was playing with the National Orchestra of Belgium (Orchestre National de Belgique).

In the 1970s he was a horn soloist with the Radio Luxemburg Orchestra (Orchestre Symphonique de Radio Luxembourg). He has taught in the United States at the University of Delaware and at the University of the Arts. For many years he taught at the Hochschule für Musik in Trossingen, Germany. Professor of Horn at the Liège Conservatory (1977–1983)
