= Horn Concerto No. 1 (Haydn) =

Horn concerto by Joseph Haydn

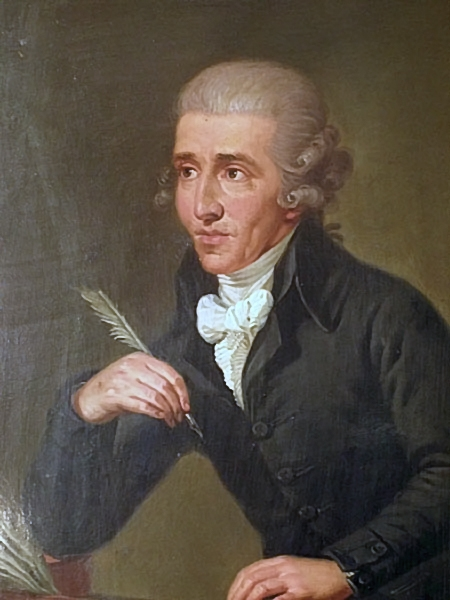
Portrait by Ludwig Guttenbrunn, painted c. 1791–92, of Joseph Haydn c. 1770

Joseph Haydn's Horn Concerto No. 1 in D major, (Hob. VIId/3) was completed in 1762, "when Haydn was new to the Esterhazy court."

Because of the range of notes in the Adagio, some musicologists believe the concerto was written for the horn player Thaddaus Steinmüller, who was skilled at playing middle and upper registers. Other musicologists believe it was a present for the baptism ceremony of one of the children of Joseph Leutgeb (for whom Mozart wrote his horn concertos).

== Structure ==
The work is in three movements:

1. Allegro
2. Adagio
3. Allegro
