= Horn Concerto No. 1 (Mozart) =

1791 composition by W. A. Mozart

- by W. A. Mozart
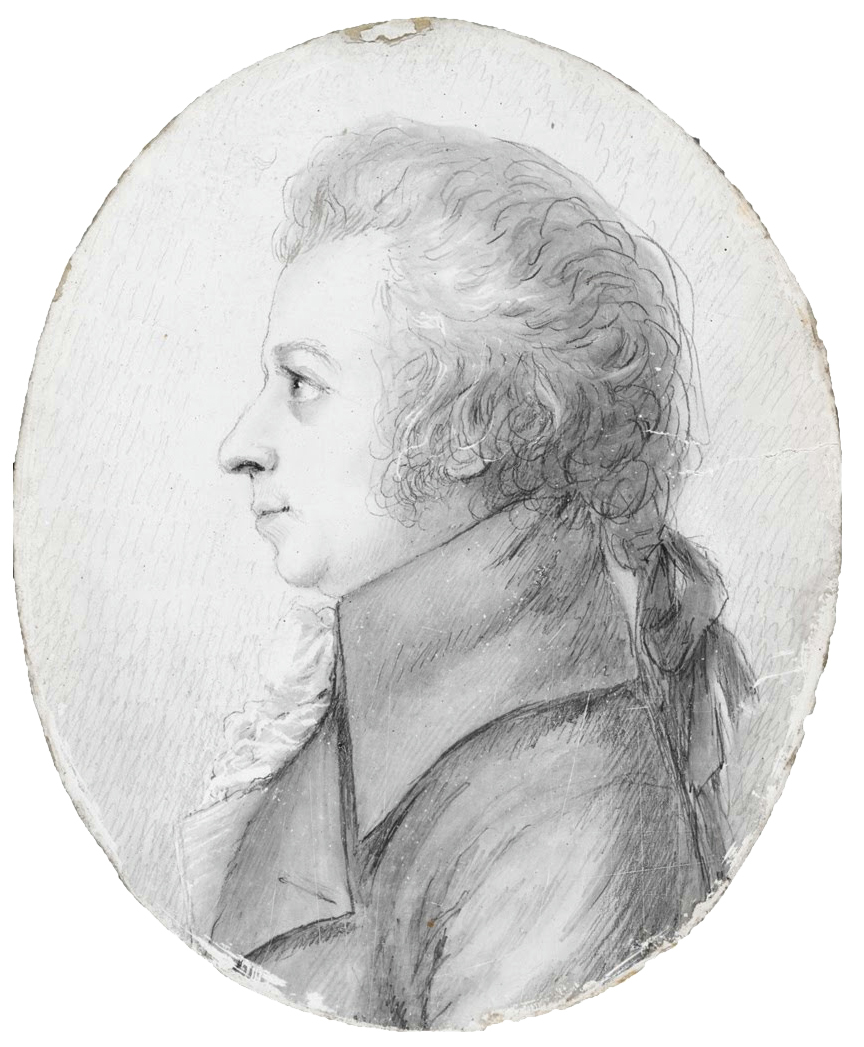
- Stock's 1789 miniature of Mozart
- Key: D major
- Catalogue: K. (412+514)/386b
- Composed: 1791
- Dedication: Joseph Leutgeb
- Duration: 10 minutes
- Movements: 2
- Scoring: Solo horn and orchestra

Wolfgang Amadeus Mozart wrote the Horn Concerto No. 1 in D major, K. (412+514)/386b, in 1791.

== Details ==
The work is in two movements. Unusually, each movement received a distinct number in the first edition of the Köchel catalogue: (K. 514)

1. Allegro 4/4 (K. 412)
2. Rondo (Allegro) 6/8

The concerto is scored for solo horn in D, two oboes, two bassoons, and strings. This is one of two horn concertos of Mozart to include bassoons (the other is Horn Concerto No. 3, K. 447), but in this one he "treats them indifferently in the first movement". It is the only one of Mozart's horn concertos to be in D major (the rest are in E♭ major) and the only one to have just two movements instead of the usual three (with the exception of the incompletely scored horn concerto, K. 370b+371).

Although numbered first, this was actually the last of the four to be completed. Compared to the other three horn concertos, it is shorter in duration (two movements rather than three) and is much simpler in regard to both range and technique, perhaps in a nod to the horn player (Mozart's great friend) Joseph Leutgeb's advanced age and (presumably) reduced capabilities at the time of composition. The second movement, K. 514, was shown by Alan Tyson to have been finished by Mozart's student Franz Xaver Süssmayr after Mozart's death.

Mozart's autograph score contains, arranged in strategic places throughout the sketch of the Rondo, a bizarre written narrative in Italian almost certainly directed at Leutgeb:

For you, Mr. Donkey—Come on—quick—get on with it—like a good fellow—be brave—Are you finished yet?—for you—beast—oh what a dissonance—Oh!—Woe is me!!—Well done, poor chap—oh, pain in the balls!—Oh God, how fast!—you make me laugh—help—take a breather—go on, go on—that's a little better—still not finished?—you awful swine!—how charming you are!—dear one!—little donkey!—ha, ha, ha—take a breath!—But do play at least one note, you prick!—Aha! Bravo, bravo, hurrah!—You're going to bore me for the fourth time, and thank God it's the last—Oh finish now, I beg of you!—Confound it—also bravura?—Bravo!—oh, a sheep bleating—you're finished?—Thank heavens!—Enough, enough!

A comparison between Mozart's draft and Süssmayr's version reveals that Süssmayr used very little of Mozart's material: bars 1–40 of Mozart's autograph corresponds almost exactly to bars 1–44 of Süssmayr's version, and the two thereafter diverge with only a few passages in Süssmayr (bars 59–62, 84–92, 109–116) bearing any close relationship to Mozart's material. Süssmayr's Rondo also makes use of a plainchant melody (the Lamentationes Ieremiae prophetae), and one explanation of this (by Christoph Wolff) is that the melody was copied out by Mozart while he was composing the Requiem, which Süssmayr later mistook as material for the Rondo.

Given some discrepancies between K. 412 and known authentic Mozart concertos, as well as correspondence between Constanze Mozart and the publisher Johann André, Benjamin Perl argues that the entire concerto is probably really Mozart's revision of a lost original Leutgeb concerto. Mozart and Süssmayr would then have been working from and correcting the same Leutgeb draft, which contained the passages that their versions have in common. A similar situation holds for the Romance from Mozart's Horn Concerto No. 3, K. 447, which also exists in two versions: one by Mozart, and another by Michael Haydn which uses almost the same theme and has many commonalities. It may also stem from a Leutgeb original composition.

== Discography ==
Given its duration (no more than 10 minutes), the Concerto is typically grouped with Mozart's other three for the instrument. One famous recording is Dennis Brain's November 1953 recording of the four horn concertos on EMI with the Philharmonia Orchestra, conducted by Herbert von Karajan.
