= Des Dichters Abendgang =

Art song composed by Richard Strauss

- Lied by Richard Strauss
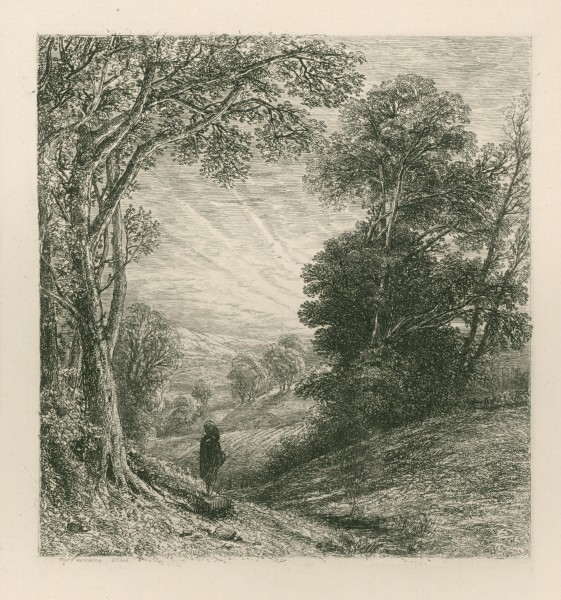
- The Evening Walk, by Thomas Creswick (1842)
- English: Of the Poets evening stroll
- Key: E Flat.
- Catalogue: TrV 200
- Opus: 47, No. 2
- Text: Ludwig Uhland
- Language: German
- Composed: May 8, 1900
- Dedication: J.C.Pflüger
- Scoring: Voice and Piano.

"Des Dichters Abendgang" ("The Poets Evening Stroll") is an art song composed by Richard Strauss using the text of a poem with the same name by Ludwig Uhland (1787–1862), the second in his Opus 47 collection, (TrV 200) which was published in 1900. Originally written for piano and voice, Strauss wrote an orchestral version in 1918.

== Composition history ==
Strauss wrote the song at his home in Charlottenburg near Berlin, completing it on May 8, 1900. Strauss set five of Uhlands's poems in his Opus 47 songs. He had only recently set another Uhland poem Die Ulme zu Hirsau (opus 43/3, 1899). The poet had also been a childhood favourite of Strauss: two of his earliest Jugendlieder (childhood songs) written in 1871 were Uhland settings. Strauss' tempo marking is "Sehr ruhig and feierlich" (very quiet and solemn) and his setting "is a full scale heroic song, originally composed in Strauss' heroic key of E flat". The song was published in a bilingual edition with English lyrics the same year. In 1918, he wrote an orchestral version of the song, this time in the key of D flat, which was premiered on April 20, 1919, in Berlin sung by tenor Ernst Kraus with Stauss conducting the Berlin Philharmonic.

== Orchestral arrangement ==
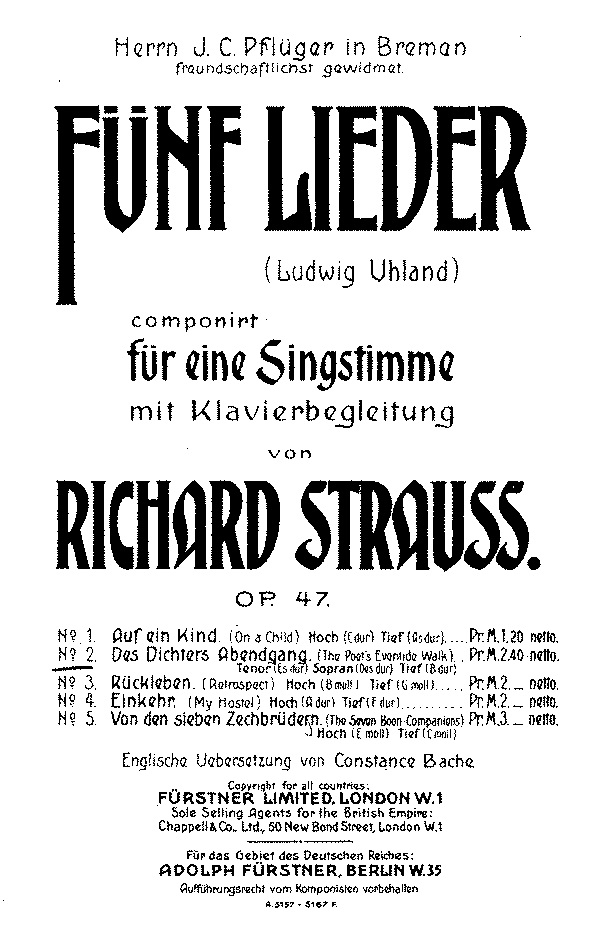
First edition published 1900

The 1918 orchestral arrangement calls for the following instruments:

- Three flutes, two oboes, English horn, two clarinets, Bass clarinet, two bassoons.
- Four french horns, three trumpets, three trombones, one tuba
- Timpani
- Two harps (playing in unison).
- Strings

== Lyrics ==
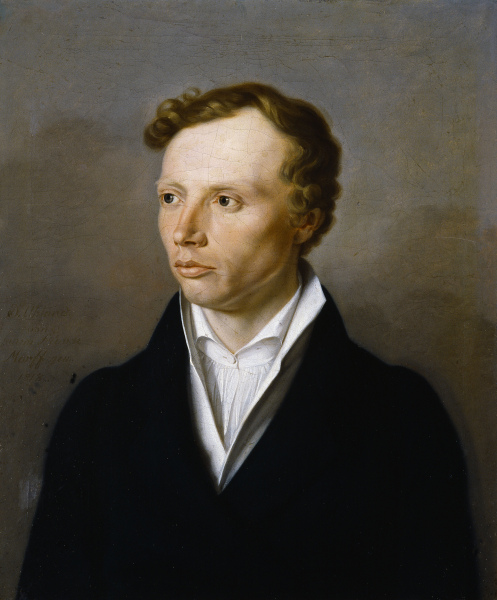
Ludwig Uhland (1818)

The poem captures the enlightenment and transcendence felt by the poet as he takes his evening stroll. The inner light guides him even when times become dark.

Des Dichters Abendgang

Ergehst du dich im Abendlicht, –
Das ist die Zeit der Dichterwonne –
So wende stets dein Angesicht
Zum Glanze der gesunknen Sonne!
In hoher Feier schwebt dein Geist,
Du schauest in des Tempels Hallen,
Wo alles Heil’ge sich erschleußt
Und himmlische Gebilde wallen.

Wann aber um das Heiligthum
Die dunkeln Wolken niederrollen:
Dann ist’s vollbracht, du kehrest um,
Beseligt von dem Wundervollen.
In stiller Rührung wirst du gehn,
Du trägst in dir des Liedes Segen;
Das Lichte, das du dort gesehn,
Umglänzt dich mild auf finstern Wegen

The Poet's Evening Stroll

If you go for a stroll in evening's light—
That's the time of a poet's bliss—
Then turn your face always
Towards the shine of the receding sun!
Your spirit soars in royal celebration,
You peer into the halls of the temple,
Where all of salvation unlocks itself
And heavenly forms float in the air.

When, however, around the sanctuary
The dark clouds roll down,
Then it is accomplished, you turn around
Blessed by all the wonders.
In silent emotion you will go,
You carry within yourself the blessing of song,
The light, that you saw there,
Gently shines upon you on the dark paths.
