= Second Essay for Orchestra (Barber) =

Orchestral work by Samuel Barber

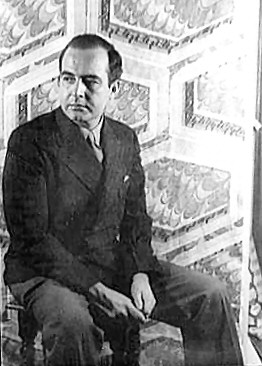
Samuel Barber in 1944

Samuel Barber's Second Essay for Orchestra (Op. 17), completed 15 March 1942, is an orchestral work in one movement. It was premiered by the New York Philharmonic-Symphony Orchestra at Carnegie Hall 16 April 1942. It lasts around 11 minutes and is dedicated to the poet Robert Horan.
