= Horn Quintet (Mozart) =

1782 composition by W. A. Mozart

- by W. A. Mozart
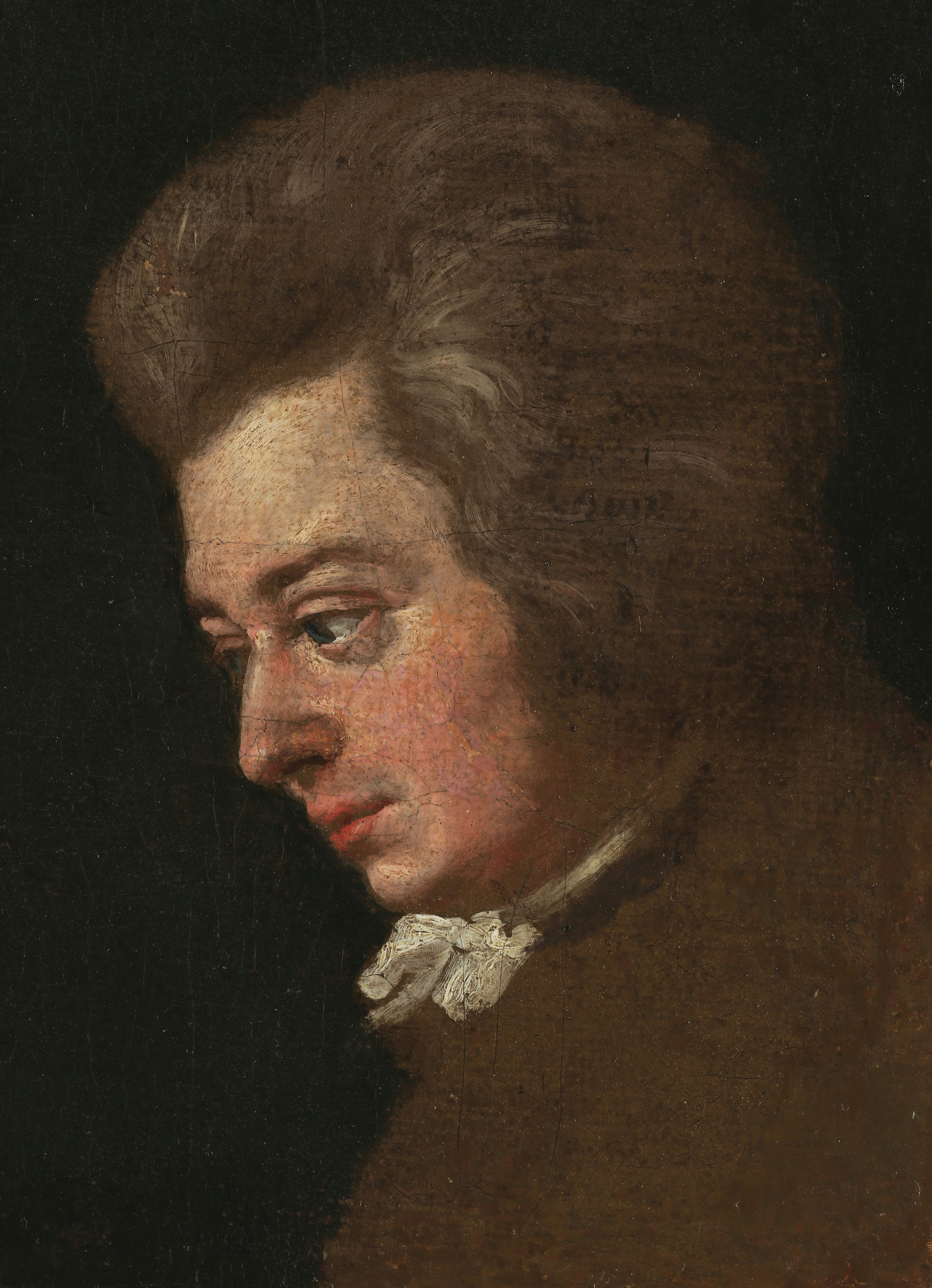
- The composer in 1782
- Key: E-flat major
- Catalogue: K. 407
- Genre: Chamber music
- Style: Classical period
- Composed: 1782
- Movements: Three (Allegro, Andante, Rondo – Allegro)
- Scoring: Horn; string quartet

Wolfgang Amadeus Mozart composed the Horn Quintet in E♭ major, K. 407 (386c), in 1782 for the soloist Joseph Leutgeb. The work calls for one horn, one violin, two violas and one cello, which differs from the typical string quartet arrangement that includes two violins.

== Structure ==
The work consists of three movements:

1. Allegro in
2. Andante in 3/8, B♭ major
3. Rondo Allegro in 2/4

A performance takes approximately 17 minutes. The inclusion of two viola parts gives the work a richer, deeper sound, complementing the range of the horn soloist.

== History ==
This piece was composed in Vienna shortly after Mozart's marriage, around the same time as Die Entführung aus dem Serail. It is the first work Mozart wrote for his friend Joseph Leutgeb. Leutgeb's instrument, a natural horn, lacked the valves found in the modern French horn. The finale makes virtuosic demands on the soloist. The later horn solo pieces for an ageing Leutgeb by Mozart show lesser demands on the soloist. The Horn Quintet was first published by Breitkopf & Härtel in 1883. Since the original autograph score has been lost, modern performances are based on this first edition.

Mozart's only other known piece of chamber music written for the instrument is a composition for solo horn, written in Salzburg in 1778. This work has been completely lost, and is only known through a letter from Leopold Mozart addressed to Wolfgang and his mother, Anna Maria, on 16 February 1778. Referred to as "a little horn piece", it is mentioned in the context of its dedicatee: "Martin Grassl, Prince Bruener's valet, was buried today, Wolfg. will recall writing a little horn piece for him." The work has subsequently been entered in the Köchel catalogue as K. 33h.
