= E-flat major =

Major scale based on E♭

- Relative key: C minor
- Parallel key: E-flat minor
- Dominant key: B-flat major
- Subdominant key: A-flat major

Component pitches
- E♭, F, G, A♭, B♭, C, D

E-flat major is a major scale based on the note E♭, consisting of the pitches E♭, F, G, A♭, B♭, C, and D. Its key signature has three flats. Its relative minor is C minor, and its parallel minor is E-flat minor.

The E♭ major scale is:

The E-flat harmonic major and melodic major scales are

== Scale degree chords ==
The scale degree chords of E♭ major are:

- Tonic – E♭ major
- Supertonic – F minor
- Mediant – G minor
- Subdominant – A♭ major
- Dominant – B♭ major
- Submediant – C minor
- Leading tone – D diminished

== Characteristics ==
The key of E♭ major is often associated with bold, heroic music, in part because of Ludwig van Beethoven's usage. His Eroica Symphony, Emperor Concerto and Grand Sonata are all in this key. Beethoven's (hypothetical) 10th Symphony is also in E♭. But even before Beethoven, Francesco Galeazzi identified E♭ major as "a heroic key, extremely majestic, grave and serious: in all these features it is superior to that of C." Jean-Benjamin de La Borde in 1780 ascribed to E♭ major the quality of being "grave and very somber".

During the Baroque era, Marc-Antoine Charpentier in his Règles de composition (circa 1682) thought of this key as "cruel and hard". Johann Mattheson in the work Das neu-eröffnete Orchestre (1713) stated that E♭ major is "pathetic; concerned with serious and plaintive things; bitterly hostile to all lasciviousness".

In the mid-eighteenth century, E♭ major became associated with ombra scenes in opera seria, describing sightings of or interactions with ghosts, demons, witches, and oracles. In the hands of composers such as Niccolò Jommelli and Tommaso Traetta, there emerges a preference for accompagnato recitatives in E♭ major for such scenes, allowing further modulation to the more extreme flat minor keys for moments of heightened drama. This preference went on to influence the key choices for ombra scenes in the operas of Christoph Willibald Gluck, Joseph Haydn and even the young Mozart.

Three of Wolfgang Amadeus Mozart's completed Horn Concertos and Joseph Haydn's Trumpet Concerto are in E♭ major and so is Anton Bruckner's Fourth Symphony with its prominent horn theme in the first movement. Another notable heroic piece in the key of E♭ major is Richard Strauss's Ein Heldenleben. The heroic theme from the Jupiter movement of Gustav Holst's The Planets is in E♭ major. Mahler's vast and heroic Eighth Symphony is in E♭ and his Second Symphony also ends in this key.

However, in the Classical period, E♭ major was not limited to solely bombastic brass music. "E-flat was the key Haydn chose most often for [string] quartets, ten times in all, and in every other case he wrote the slow movement in the dominant, B-flat major." Or "when composing church music and operatic music in E♭ major, [Joseph] Haydn often substituted cors anglais for oboes in this period", and also in Symphony No. 22.

E♭ major was the second-flattest key Mozart used in his music. For him, E♭ major was associated with Freemasonry; "E-flat evoked stateliness and an almost religious character."

Edward Elgar wrote his Variation IX "Nimrod" from the Enigma Variations in E♭ major. Its strong, yet vulnerable character has led the piece to become a staple at funerals, especially in Great Britain.

Shostakovich used the E♭ major scale to sarcastically evoke military glory in his Symphony No. 9.

== Well-known compositions in this key ==
- Johann Sebastian Bach
  - Cello Suite No. 4, BWV 1010
  - Prelude & Fugue in E-flat major "St. Anne", BWV 552
- Ludwig van Beethoven
  - Septet for Strings and Woodwinds, Op. 20
  - Symphony No. 3, Op. 55 "Eroica"
  - Piano Concerto No. 5, Op. 73 "Emperor"
  - Piano Sonata No. 4, Op. 7 "Grand Sonata"
  - Piano Sonata No. 18, Op. 31/3 "The Hunt"
  - Piano Sonata No. 26, Op. 81a "Les Adieux"
  - Violin Sonata No. 3, Op. 12/3
  - Piano Trio, Op.70 No.2
  - Sextet for Horns and String Quartet, Op. 81b
  - String Quartet No. 10, Op. 74
  - String Quartet No. 12, Op. 127
- Vincenzo Bellini
  - Oboe Concerto
- Johannes Brahms
  - Intermezzo for piano op. 117/1
  - Rhapsody for piano op. 119/4
  - Clarinet Sonata op. 120/2
  - Horn trio op. 40
- Max Bruch
  - Scottish Fantasy, Op. 46
- Anton Bruckner
  - Symphony No. 4, WAB 104 "Romantic"
- Frédéric Chopin
  - Nocturne, Op. 9, No. 2
  - Étude, Op. 10, No. 11
  - Grande valse brillante, Op. 18
  - Andante spianato et grande polonaise brillante, Op. 22
  - Prelude, Op. 28, No. 19
  - Nocturne, Op. 55, No. 2
- Jan Ladislav Dussek
  - Piano Sonata, Op. 44 ("The Farewell")
- Antonín Dvořák
  - Piano Quartet Op. 87
  - String Quartet Op. 51
  - String Quintet Op. 97
- Edward Elgar
  - Variations on an Original Theme, Variation IX "Nimrod"
- Joseph Haydn
  - String Quartet Op. 33, No. 2, "The Joke"
  - Symphony No. 22, Hob.I:22 "Philosopher"
  - Symphony No. 103, Hob.I:103 "Drumroll"
  - Trumpet Concerto, Hob.VIIe:1
  - Piano Trio No. 45, Hob.XV:29
  - Piano Sonata, No. 59, Hob.XVI/49
  - Piano Sonata, No. 62, Hob XVI/52
- Franz Liszt
  - Piano Concerto No. 1, S.124
  - Transcendental Étude No. 7 "Eroica"
- Gustav Mahler
  - Symphony No. 8, "The Symphony of a Thousand"
- Felix Mendelssohn
  - Sonata for clarinet and piano
  - Octet, Op. 20
  - String Quartet (unnumbered)
  - String Quartet No. 5 Op. 44, No. 3
- Wolfgang Amadeus Mozart
  - Serenade for winds, K. 375
  - Piano Concerto No. 9, K. 271 "Jeunehomme"
  - Piano Concerto No. 10 for two pianos, K. 365/316a
  - Piano Concerto No. 14, K. 449
  - Piano Concerto No. 22, K. 482
  - Sinfonia Concertante for violin and viola, K. 364/320d
  - Symphony No. 1, K. 16
  - Symphony No. 39, K. 543
  - Piano Sonata, K. 282 (189g)
  - Divertimento for String Trio, K. 563
  - Trio for clarinet, viola and piano, K. 498
  - Piano Quartet, K. 493
  - Quintet for Piano and Winds, K. 452
  - String Quintet, K. 614
  - Horn Quintet, K. 407 (386c)
  - Horn Concerto, K. 417
  - Horn Concerto, K. 447
  - Horn Concerto, K. 495
- Camille Saint-Saëns
  - Septet, Op. 65
  - Sonata for clarinet and piano, Op. 167
  - Violin Sonata No. 2, Op. 102
- Franz Schubert
  - Impromptu, Op. 90, No. 2
  - Piano Trio No. 2
  - Mass No. 6, D. 950
- Robert Schumann
  - Symphony No. 3, Op. 97 "Rhenish"
  - Piano Quintet, Op. 44
  - Piano Quartet Op. 47
- Dmitri Shostakovich
  - Cello Concerto No. 1, Op. 107
  - Symphony No. 3, Op. 20
  - Symphony No. 9, Op. 70
- Jean Sibelius
  - Symphony No. 5, Op. 82
- John Philip Sousa
  - The Stars and Stripes Forever
- Pyotr Ilyich Tchaikovsky
  - 1812 Overture, Op. 49
  - Piano Concerto No. 3
- Richard Wagner
  - Prelude to Das Rheingold
- Carl Maria von Weber
  - Clarinet Concerto, Op. 74
  - Grand Duo Concertant, Op. 48

== Notes ==
No.	Flats		Sharps	
No.	Major	minor	Major	minor
0	C	a	C	a
1	F	d	G	e
2	B♭	g	D	b
3	E♭	c	A	f♯
4	A♭	f	E	c♯
5	D♭	b♭	B	g♯
6	G♭	e♭	F♯	d♯
7	C♭	a♭	C♯	a♯
8	F♭	d♭	G♯	e♯
