= Horn Concerto No. 1 (Strauss) =

1883 Concerto by Richard Strauss

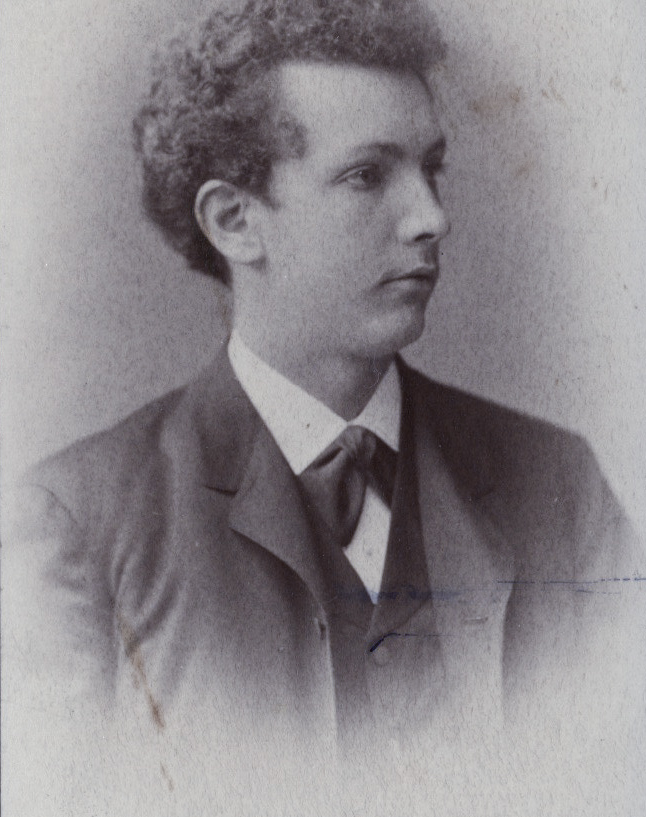
Richard Strauss in 1886

In 1882–83, Richard Strauss wrote his Horn Concerto No. 1 in E♭ major, Op. 11, TrV 117, in two versions, one for piano accompaniment and one with an orchestra. The horn part is the same. The premiere with piano accompaniment was given in 1883 at Munich, and that with orchestral accompaniment in 1885 at Meiningen. In 1942, towards the end of his life, Strauss wrote a second horn concerto.

A typical performance lasts about 15–18 minutes.

== Composition history ==
At the age of 18 whilst a philosophy student at the Ludwig-Maximilians-Universität München, having recently completed his Violin Concerto and Cello Sonata, Strauss wrote his first horn concerto. His father Franz Strauss was one of the leading horn players of his day, and the fact that Richard grew up with the sound of the horn in his house led to his exploration of the great potential of the horn as both a solo and orchestral instrument. Although he had previously written a short piece for the solo horn (Two études for horn TrV 15, 1873), the concerto was the first orchestral piece he chose to write for the horn.

The version with orchestral accompaniment is entitled "Waldhornkonzert", indicating that the concerto was to be played on the natural valveless horn (Waldhorn), which was the horn of preference played by his father (although Franz also played the valved F horn). Whilst it is technically possible to play the concerto on an E♭ natural horn, in practice it would be impossible to give a convincing performance. Alan Jefferson speculates that the title might in fact be a father-son joke. Strauss's sister Johanna wrote to the British horn player Dennis Brain that she "vividly remembered her father struggling with the solo part, which he found very tiring, even using the high B♭ crook. In particular, he seems to have found the high B♭s too daring and dangerous for performance in the concert hall".

The early public performances would have been made using the valved F single horn, which was indicated in the score in later editions (although the orchestral horns were still specified as E♭ natural horns). In practice, all of the modern performances and recordings are played on the valved F double-horn which was developed at the end of the 19th century. When the concerto was written, the use of natural horns was still common. For example, Brahms continued to write for natural horns in his symphonies (Symphony No. 3 is contemporaneous with the Horn Concerto) because he deemed the sound better. Strauss himself went on to fully exploit the possibilities of the valved horn in his tone poems starting with Don Juan, written just a few years later.

== Music ==
The concerto is in three movements which are played continuously (except very rarely):

1. Allegro
2. Andante
3. Allegro

The composition is typical of Strauss' music at this time in being Romantic in style, showing the influence of Mendelssohn. The orchestral version uses a classical orchestra: 2 flutes, 2 oboes, 2 clarinets, 2 bassoons, 2 horns, 2 trumpets, timpani, and strings.

== Premiere ==
The public premiere with piano was in 1883, shortly after the composition completed with one of Franz Strauss's pupils Bruno Hoyer as soloist. The orchestral version was premiered at Meiningen with Hans von Bülow conducting and the horn part played by the principal horn Gustav Leinhos on 4 March 1885. Strauss wrote to his father that the soloist had "Kolossaler sicherheit" (colossal sureness). Strauss conducted the work at least three times later in his life: Vienna on 7 May 1921, Mannheim on 3 November 1929, and Hannover on 9 October 1931.

== Recordings ==
There have been many recordings of this piece. The first recording was by Dennis Brain in 1947, recorded in Kingsway Hall, London, 21 May 1947 with Alceo Galliera conducting the Philharmonia Orchestra. Those currently available with orchestral accompaniment include:

CD title and release date (if known)	Horn player	Orchestra and conductor	Label and reference
Richard Strauss: Horn Concertos Nos. 1 & 2 (2006)	David Jolley	Israel Sinfonietta Be'er Sheva, Uri Mayer	Arabesque Recordings - Z6733
Horn Concertos by Strauss and Hindemith (2013)	Dennis Brain	Philharmonia Orchestra, Alceo Galliera	Regis - RRC1407
Dennis Brain: The essential collection Vol.5 (2014)	Dennis Brain	Philharmonia Orchestra, Wolfgang Sawallisch	Documents 299708
Zdeněk Tylšar: Richard Strauss / Franz Strauss / Mozart: Horn Concertos (2006)	Zdeněk Tylšar	Czech Philharmonic Orchestra, Václav Neumann	Supraphon SU 3892-2
Die schonsten Hornkonzerte (2009)	Hermann Baumann	WDR Symphony Orchestra Cologne, Gunter Wand	Profil Medien PH08075
Strauss: Horn Concertos Nos. 1 & 2 (2013)	Marie Luise Neunecker	Bamberg Symphony, Ingo Metzmacher	EMI 7235472
Richard Strauss: Horn concertos 1 and 2 (1997)	Lars-Michael-Stransky	Wiener Philharmoniker, André Previn	Deutsche Gramaphon E4534832
Strauss - The Concertos (1999)	Barry Tuckwell	London Symphony Orchestra, István Kertész	Decca E4602962
Strauss: Horn Concerto No. 1 in E flat major, Op. 11, etc.	Barry Tuckwell	Royal Philharmonic Orchestra, Vladimir Ashkenazy	Australian Eloquence: ELQ4762699
R Strauss: Horn Concertos 1 & 2, Oboe Concerto (2006)	Hermann Baumann	Gewandhausorchester Leipzig, Kurt Masur	Philips: 4769188
R. Strauss: Orchestral Works and Concertos (2014)	Myron Bloom	Cleveland Orchestra, George Szell	Sony: 88883798632
Daniel Barenboim conducts R. Strauss (2010)	Dale Clevenger	Chicago Symphony Orchestra, Daniel Barenboim	Apex 2564679408
R. Strauss: Complete Orchestral Works (2013)	Peter Damm	Staatskapelle Dresden, Rudolf Kempe	Warner Classics: 4317802

Recordings with piano accompaniment include:

CD title and release date	Horn player	Pianist	Reference
R. Strauss: Complete Chamber Music (2011)	Johannes Ritzkowsky	Wolfgang Sawallisch	Brilliant Classics 9231

== Sources ==
- Logan Bonathon, The history and practice of performances of Richard Strauss' Concerto No.1 for horn (opus 11.)
- Norman Del Mar, Richard Strauss: A critical commentary on his life and works, Volume 1. Faber and Faber, London, second edition 1985 (1961), ISBN 978-0-571-25096-7.
- Oscar Franz and Richard Strauss on the Horn in the Late Nineteenth Century, John Ericson, The Arizona State University Horn Studio.
- Richard Strauss: The Two Concertos for Horn and Orchestra, Gary A. Greene, Thesis, Butler University, January 1978.
