= Hermann Baumann (musician) =

German horn player (1934–2023)

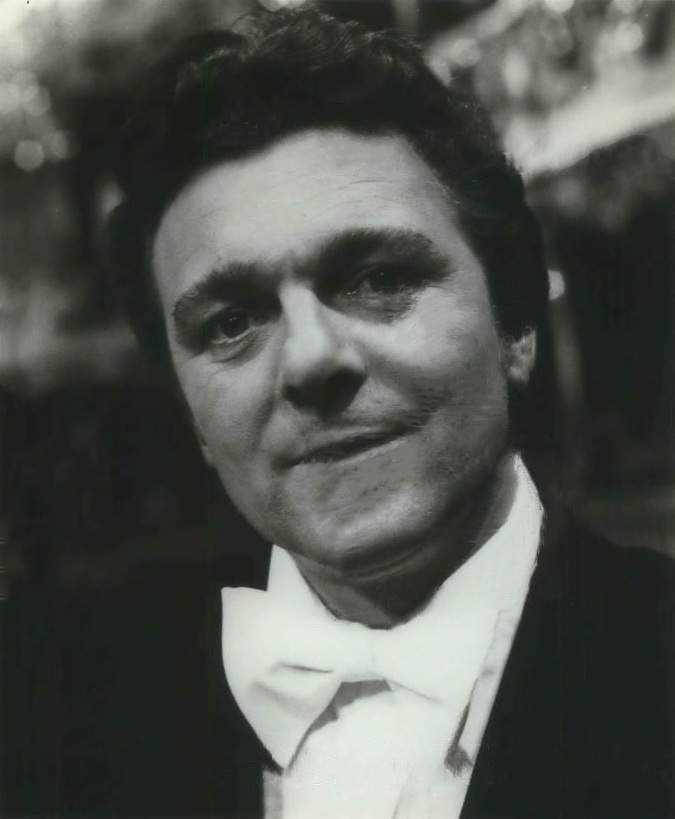
- Baumann, c. 1984
- Born: 1 August 1934; Hamburg, Germany
- Died: 29 December 2023 (aged 89)
- Occupation: Classical horn player
- Organizations: Folkwang Hochschule
- Website: hermannbaumann.de

Hermann Rudolph Michel Konrad Baumann (1 August 1934 – 29 December 2023) was a German horn player who was a pioneer of the natural horn in the revival of both Baroque and Classical period music. He was a principal hornist of leading orchestras, and made an international career as a soloist. He made recordings such as Mozart's Horn Concertos on a natural horn with Nikolaus Harnoncourt and the first recording of Ligeti's 1982 Horn Trio, which he had premiered. Baumann was professor of horn at the Folkwang Hochschule in Essen from 1969 for around 30 years.

== Biography ==
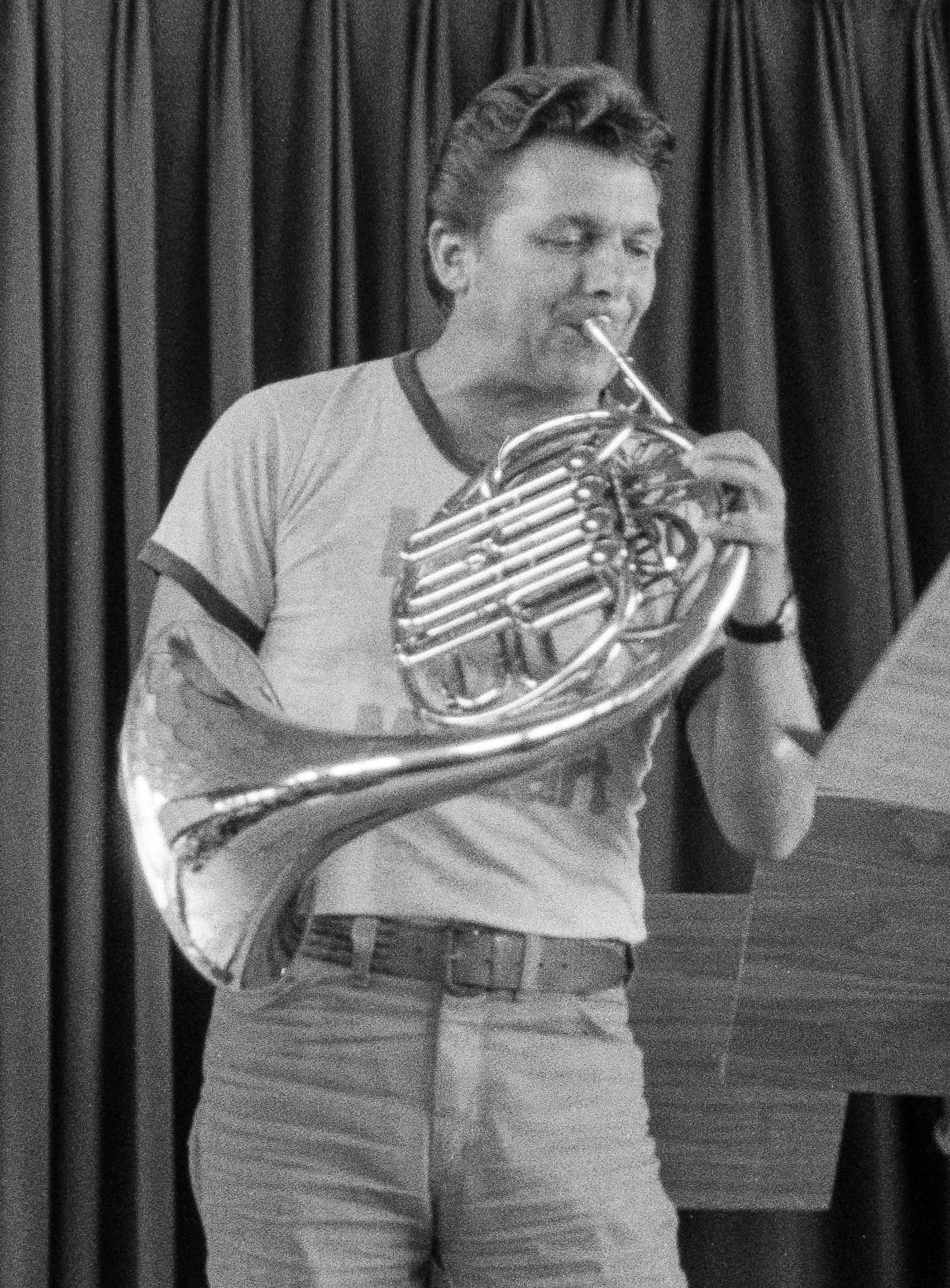
Baumann in 1980

Baumann started his musical career as a singer and jazz drummer. He switched to horn at the age of 17. He studied with Fritz Huth at the Hochschule für Musik Würzburg and then played principal horn in orchestras for 12 years, including the Dortmunder Philharmoniker and the Stuttgart Radio Symphony Orchestra, where he served from 1961 to 1967.

His career as a soloist started in 1964 when he won first prize in the ARD International Music Competition in Munich. He was a pioneer of the revival of performance on the natural horn, both the Baroque or the Classical period. In 1999, the Historic Brass Society honored him with the Christopher Monk Award for his lifelong contribution to music on historic instruments.

Baumann commissioned new compositions from Jean-Luc Darbellay, Bernhard Krol and Hans-Georg Pflüger. He played the world premiere of Ligeti's Horn Trio to the composer's approval. He composed works himself, such as Elegia for Handhorn solo.

Baumann taught at the Folkwang Hochschule in Essen from 1969 for 30 years and at horn conventions around the world. His tone was described as expressive and singing, with good and secure intonation. The quality of human singing was partly achieved by a specific vibrato, adequate in lyrical passages. He advised his students to sing a theme first before playing it on the horn.

=== Personal life ===
Baumann was born in Hamburg on 1 August 1934. He was married to Hella for forty years until her death in 1997. He suffered a stroke after a concert with the Buffalo Philharmonic. With his right side paralysed, he had to relearn to walk, speak, write and play horn. Five months after the stroke, he began to teach again.

Baumann died on 29 December 2023, at the age of 89.

== Recordings ==
Baumann was a regular hornist for Karl Richter and the Münchener Bach-Chor, for performances and recordings of Bach cantatas and his Mass in B minor, recorded in 1969.

Baumann made pioneering recordings with natural horns, such as Nikolaus Harnoncourt's 1974 recording of Mozart's Horn Concertos with the Concentus Musicus Wien, after having recorded the works on a modern horn with the Academy of St Martin in the Fields.

Baumann recorded the Horn Concerto No. 1 by Richard Strauss for the broadcaster WDR with the Kölner Rundfunk-Sinfonieorchester conducted by Günter Wand in 1975; it was later issued on CD. He recorded both Strauss Horn Concertos with Kurt Masur. His 1985 recording of Villanelle by Paul Dukas in an arrangement by Vitaly Bujanovsky, with the Gewandhaus Orchestra conducted by Masur, was included in 2002 in a collection The World of the French Horn. He was the hornist in the world premiere and first recording of Ligeti's 1982 Horn Trio, with violinist Saschko Gawriloff and pianist Eckart Besch who had commissioned the work. Some of his recordings from 1984 to 1994 were collected as Virtuoso Horn, released in 2004.

He recorded chamber music in 1977, evening songs and love songs (Abendlieder, Liebeslieder und Romanzen) sung by Klesie Kelly and Ian Partridge, and other instrumental soloists, clarinetist Dieter Klöcker, bassoonist Karl-Otto Hartmann and pianist Werner Genuit. In 1993, he recorded chamber music for horn and strings that he described as "the essential chamber works for horn and strings of the Classical and Romantic periods", such as Mozart's Horn Quintet, K. 407.
