= Joseph Leutgeb =

Austrian hornist (1732–1811)

Joseph Leutgeb (or Leitgeb; 6 October 1732 – 27 February 1811) was an Austrian horn player of the classical era, a friend and musical inspiration for Joseph Haydn and Wolfgang Amadeus Mozart.

== Life ==
Leutgeb was born in Neulerchenfeld, today a suburb of Vienna, but little is known of his early years. The composer Carl Ditters von Dittersdorf stated that Leutgeb performed in Vienna in the early 1750s for Prince Hildburghausen. During the early 1760s, Leutgeb's career flourished; according to Daniel Heartz, he "was the most prominent horn soloist in Vienna, and evidently one of the best received players on any solo instrument.". It is recorded that during the period 21 November 1761 to 28 January 1763 he performed horn concertos by Leopold Hofmann, Michael Haydn and Dittersdorf at the Burgtheater.

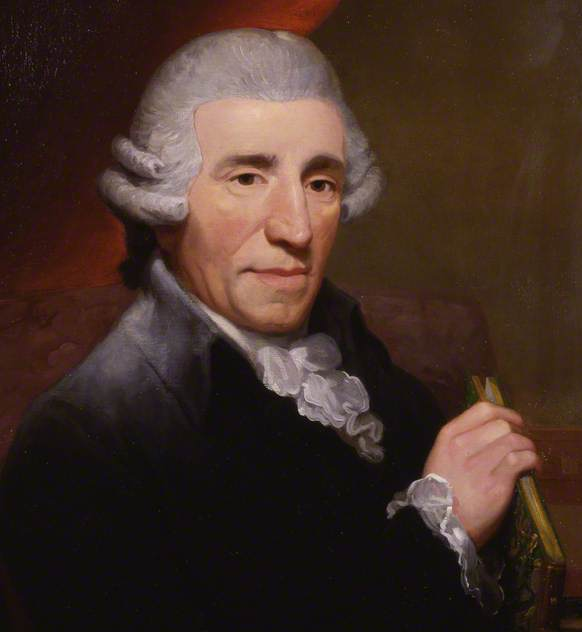
Joseph Haydn

Heartz suggests that at this time (1762) Joseph Haydn wrote his Concerto in D, Hob. VIId/3D, for Leutgeb. The two were likely friends, as on 3 July 1763 Haydn's wife served as godmother for Leutgeb's child Maria Anna Apollonia. Michael Lorenz showed that Leutgeb's signature can be found on the autograph score of Haydn's Horn concerto. In February 1763 Leutgeb was briefly a part of the musical establishment of the Esterházy family, directed at the time by Haydn. He was paid a "high yearly salary" but departed, for reasons unknown, after only one month.

In the same year Leutgeb moved to Salzburg and joined the musical establishment of the ruling Prince-Archbishop, and thus became a colleague of Leopold Mozart and (later the same year), the Konzertmeister Michael Haydn. He also made friends with a seven-year-old child prodigy, Leopold's son Wolfgang. A letter to friends from Leopold, traveling with his family on tour (20 August 1763), includes a list of people that Wolfgang told Leopold he missed; Leutgeb was one of them. Wolfgang was ultimately employed by the court music establishment and thus became Leutgeb's colleague.

Like Leopold and Wolfgang, Leutgeb took frequent leaves from his job to perform in other cities, including Paris, Vienna, Frankfurt, and cities in Italy; the three of them actually toured together in Italy in February 1773. In Milan, Wolfgang and Leopold wrote home to Salzburg about Leutgeb's reception and predicted great success for him.

In 1777, Leutgeb moved back to Vienna and bought a small house in Altlerchenfeld, assisted by a loan from Leopold; in 1782, Wolfgang, who had moved there before, wrote to Leopold about the loan, which was still unpaid: "Please have a little patience with poor Leutgeb. If you knew his circumstances and saw how he has to muddle through, you would certainly feel sorry for him. I shall have a word with him and I feel sure that he will pay you, at any rate by installments."

Leutgeb continued to work as a horn player in Vienna (see following section), but did not retire from playing in 1792. Based on Leutgeb's letter to Leopold older reference sources sometimes assert that Leutgeb ran a cheese shop; this in fact had been a sausage shop run by his father-in-law, who until his death in 1763 had worked as a "Cerveladmacher", producing Italian sausages. The sausage shop was sold in 1764. Leutgeb never owned a cheese shop. Leutgeb died in Vienna.

A press review of one of Leutgeb's performances in Paris (Mercure de France) indicates he was a fine performer: the reviewer said Leutgeb was a "superior talent", with the ability to "sing an adagio as perfectly as the most mellow, interesting and accurate voice".

== Relationship with Mozart ==
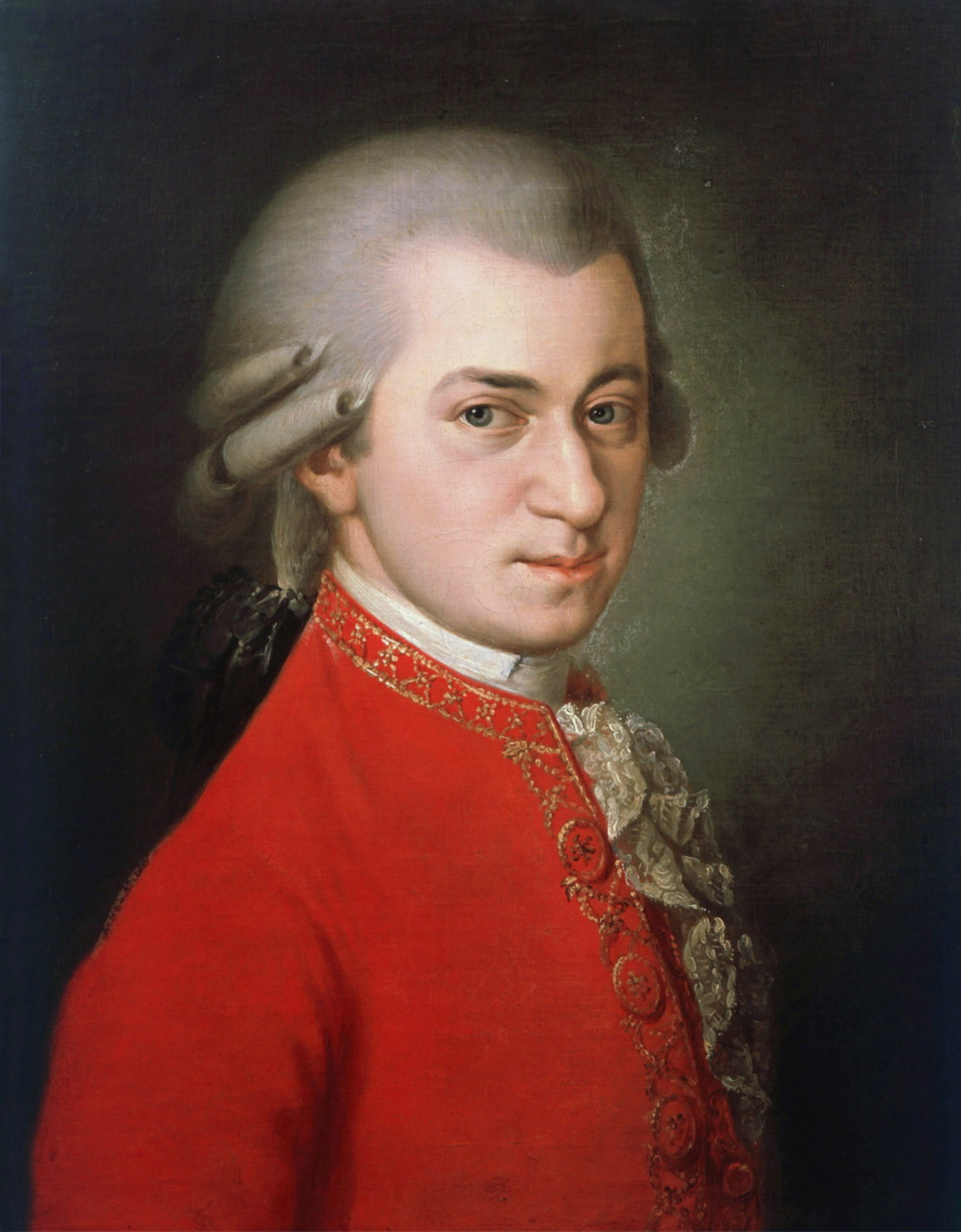
Wolfgang Amadeus Mozart

Leutgeb was most likely Mozart's favorite horn player, as a number of the composer's works were written for him. These include the Horn Concertos K. 417, K. 495 and K. 412/386b (514) and "probably" the Horn Quintet K. 407/386c. These date from Mozart's years in Vienna after his move there in 1781. The concertos are at the core of the solo horn literature and are widely performed today. These works were written for natural horn, the valved instrument not being invented until after 1814 when Heinrich Stölzel invented the valve, patented in 1818. Leutgeb thus needed to exercise great lip control, as well as using the hand-stopping technique (hand in bell) to play chromatic notes.

Mozart had a curious joking relationship with Leutgeb, seen for instance in the mocking comments he placed in Leutgeb's horn parts. K. 417 bears the mock dedication: "Wolfgang Amadé Mozart takes pity on Leutgeb, ass, ox, and simpleton, at Vienna, 27 March 1783". In one place he marks the orchestra part "Allegro" and the solo part "Adagio", perhaps mocking the tendency of horn notes to come in late, dragging the tempo. For another possible instance, see K. 412. The multicolored inks in K. 495 are often taken to be a kind of joke, though Mozart biographer Konrad Küster has claimed they had a purpose, specifically "to make some musical suggestions to the interpreters."

Letters from the end of Mozart's life suggests that Leutgeb did not mind the teasing and that the two had a good friendship. A letter by Mozart of 6 June 1791 indicates that, while his wife Constanze was away, he stayed for several nights at Leutgeb's, "because I had discharged [the maid] Leonore and I would have been all alone at home, which would not have been pleasant." Later the same year, after the highly successful premiere of his opera The Magic Flute, Mozart repeatedly took friends and relatives to performances, and wrote in a letter (8–9 October) "Leutgeb begged me to take him a second time and I did so."
