= John Zirbel =

American-born French horn player

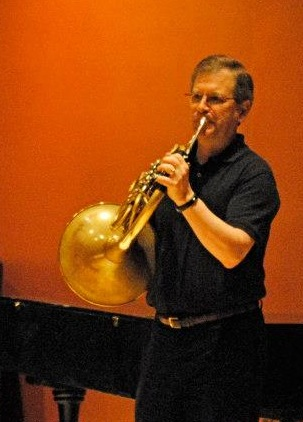
John Zirbel

John Zirbel is an American-born French horn player and teacher. He was the principal horn of the Montreal Symphony Orchestra (1978/1979–2019) and one of the principal horns at the Aspen Music Festival and School orchestra (from 2000), and also spent a season as principal horn at the San Francisco Symphony (in 2000) and the Cincinnati Symphony Orchestra (in 2005). He has also performed as a soloist in concertos and chamber works, including giving the premieres of Jacques Hétu's Sérénade Héroique (2001) and Denis Gougeon's Cor et Âme (2015). He taught at McGill University and the Aspen Music Festival and School. His awards include a prize at the Grand Concours international de Cor in Liège (1981) and the Punto Award of the International Horn Society (2023).

== Biography ==
Zirbel comes from Janesville, Wisconsin. He trained under John Iltis, and then Douglas Hill and John Barrows at the University of Wisconsin.

His first orchestral position was with the Denver Symphony (1976–79). He served as the principal horn of Montreal Symphony Orchestra (L'Orchestre Symphonique de Montréal) from 1978 or 1979 to 2019. This included touring internationally, such as a tour of Germany in 1999. In 2000 he spent a sabbatical year as principal horn to the San Francisco Symphony, under Michael Tilson Thomas, but did not achieve tenure at that orchestra, and returned to the Montreal Symphony. The San Francisco-based music critic Joshua Kosman commented that Zirbel's arrival in 1998 had been "among the most exciting personnel developments in years"; writing that he had made a "spectacularly forceful" impression in his debut performance with the orchestra, and later gave "magnificent" versions of the French horn concerto staples.

In 2000, Zirbel took up an additional position as one of the principal horns of the orchestra of the Aspen Music Festival and School. In 2005, he was the principal horn of the Cincinnati Symphony Orchestra for one season. During his career, he performed as a guest principal horn with the NHK Symphony Orchestra and the St. Paul Chamber Orchestra, as well as the orchestras of Milwaukee, San Francisco, St. Louis and Toronto. He retired from the Montreal Symphony in 2019, with his final appearances being on a two-week tour of the Americas with the conductor Kent Nagano, including concerts in the Teatro Colón, Buenos Aires, and the Symphony Center in Chicago.

In his solo career, Zirbel performed all of the standard horn concertos with Montreal Symphony Orchestra and the San Francisco Symphony. He gave the first performance of Jacques Hétu's Sérénade Héroique, a concerto which was written for him, with the Montreal Symphony Orchestra conducted by Vassily Sinaisky in 2001. In 2015, he gave the first performance of Cor et Âme by Denis Gougeon, described as a "high-speed technical catalogue of French horn sounds", with the Montreal Symphony under Bramwell Tovey.

Zirbel taught the French horn at McGill University and the Aspen Music Festival and School. In 2002, he taught at the Pacific Music Festival Academy in Japan, directed by Charles Dutoit.

== Critical appreciation ==
=== Concertos ===
In 2000, Zirbel played Richard Strauss' Horn Concerto No. 2 with the San Francisco Symphony conducted by Michael Tilson Thomas; Ulrich Allan, reviewing for the San Francisco Examiner, describes the performance as "luscious" and "ravishing", praising Zirbel's "impeccable intonation, incredible breath support and sheer elan". Kosman describes this performance as "dazzling". Zirbel played the same concerto in 1998 with the Montreal Symphony under Charles Dutoit; Ilse Zadrozny comments that he was "in top form" negotiating the "enormously difficult" part, delivering "fine tone", which was "especially ingratiating" in the second movement, and showed "enviable agility" in the finale. Eric McLean declares that he has "tamed the instrument" in a review of his 1981 "spirited and well-prepared" performance of Strauss' Horn Concerto No. 1 with the Montreal Symphony under Uri Mayer.

Zirbel's 2001 premiere of Hétu's Sérénade Héroique is described by Arthur Kaptainis as having "spot-on articulation and confident projection", with Zirbel being "first among equals" despite a strong part for the orchestral horns. In 2006 his playing of John Williams' Horn Concerto is described by Kaptainis as "masterly in both forceful and atmospheric passages."

In a 1987 review of Mozart's Horn Concerto, with the Montreal Symphony conducted by Charles Dutoit, McLean describes Zirbel's work as "a beautifully controlled performance, with the kind of nicely shaped phrasing that makes it sound easy ... which it is not!" In a 1985 review of Mozart's Sinfonia Concertante in E flat, with the Montreal Symphony under Andrew Litton, McLean writes "I was particularly struck by the way Zirbel played the French horn part, which calls for – and got – a true virtuoso." In a 1984 review of Mozart's Horn Concerto No. 4, with the Montreal Symphony under Dutoit, Carl Urquhart comments on the "fine resonance" to Zirbel's tone in the Andante, and compliments the "technique and the maturity of his ideas" in the fast movements.

=== Chamber music ===
In a 1985 review of a chamber concert, Urquhart writes that Zirbel "drew on an extraordinary array of spatial and coloristic effects" in his performance of Vitaly Bujanovsky's Sonata for Solo Horn, and likens his playing in Saint-Saens' Romance to a "graceful dolphin". Kaptainis describes Ligeti's Trio for Violin, Horn and Piano as a vehicle for Zirbel's "breath supply and tonal control at pianissimo", in a review of a 2002 performance. McLean describes Zirbel as a "musician of the first order" and praises his interpretation of Strauss' Andante in a horn-focused chamber concert in 1986, describing him as creating a "smooth and singing line, with complete confidence", but writes that some of the other pieces selected lacked imagination, and "failed to bring out Zirbel's best".

Reviewing a brass-focused chamber concert in 1998, Kaptainis writes that Zirbel gave an "ideally mellow" though "not quite note-perfect" performance of Schumann's Adagio and Allegro Op. 70, as well as creating "beautiful music" with a "robust" central part in Franz Strauss' Nocturne Op. 7. In 2008, his playing of Brahms' Horn Trio is described by Kaptainis as displaying "his habitual warmth and security."

== Awards ==
In 1981, he was awarded a prize at the Grand Concours international de Cor in Liège, Belgium. In 2023, he received the Punto Award of the International Horn Society.

== Personal life ==
His wife is the oboist Margaret Morse (as of 2006), who also played with the Montreal Symphony. His sister, Alexa Zirbel, was also an oboist with the orchestra. In 1984, he was playing a French horn by Steve Lewis (Chicago), which cost $4,800.
