= Wiener Klangstil =

"Viennese sound style" of orchestral and chamber works

The "Wiener Klangstil" (English: Viennese sound style) is the particular way in which Viennese and – to an extent – Austrian orchestras interpret orchestral and chamber works, preferring a performance style and tonal qualities markedly different from international practice. This term to describe the characteristics of the Viennese style of playing was first defined by Gregor Widholm in 2006 in the Österreichisches Musiklexikon, vol. 5.

== Origins ==
The first use of the expression "Wiener Klangstil" was in 1966 in a letter from Dr. Hans Sittner, the former president of the Vienna Akademie für Musik und darstellende Kunst (Academy of Music and Performing Arts) to the Federal ministry recommending the formation of six new scientific institutes for the academic year 1966/67. One of these was to be an institute of "Wiener Klangstil". Under the direction of Prof. Dr. Hans Hadamovsky the institute existed on paper until 1980, but was not especially active. A letter from the director to the academic board in 1971 defined for the first time the objectives of the institute, namely: to establish the fundamental principles of the Wiener Klangstil. In 1973 Dr. Hadamovsky issued privately a three-volume, handwritten work on "Der Wiener Bläserstil", which for the first time gave both description and definition of the contemporary Viennese playing tradition, though very subjective and based on contestable science. The allocation of an assistant professorship in 1980 gave the institute new impetus and led to sound scientifically based investigations into the construction, acoustics and playing techniques of the Vienna oboe, the Vienna horn and the Vienna timpani. Its use in national and above all international publications firmly established "Wiener Klangstil" as a concept at home and abroad, though still without a clear definition.

== Characteristics: Wind instruments ==
Vibrato is used sparingly and for specific expressive effect, not as a stylistic device. The preference is for instruments which can readily alter tone colour according to the played dynamic intensity. A generally brighter timbre (richer overtone spectrum) of the oboe, due to lighter reed, and of horn, trombone and tuba, due to narrower bore. The characteristic timbre of clarinet and trumpet, on the other hand, is considerably darker (fewer overtones) than for instruments in use in most other countries.

== Characteristics: Percussion ==
Drums and timpani utilise exclusively (and only in Vienna) drumheads of goat skin. Because the radial modes of vibration are stronger with these skins Vienna timpani contain a much higher proportion of tonal components. The characteristics of the skins also determine the material used for the stick heads and grip.

== Characteristics: String instruments ==
The instruments are no different from those in other international orchestras, the characteristics of the “Viennese string style” being entirely dependent on the human component. For most of these instruments there is evidence of string schools from the Viennese classical period to our day being taught by the concertmasters of the great Viennese orchestras, who passed on the musical tradition from master to pupil. Playing in a chamber music style and drawing on the Bohemian, Czech and Russian schools are also key features of the Viennese string sound.

== General characteristics ==
The Wiener Klangstil is rooted stylistically in the rules of interpretation of Viennese Classicism mixed with German Romanticism. There is a clear preference for instruments which allow the player to control tone colour within a particular musical context. Just as the individual is subject to a process of continual change, so, too, is the characteristic style and timbre of an orchestra. An example of this constant evolutionary process can be heard in the use of vibrato by the strings of the Vienna Philharmonic during the 20th century. Similarly, the “Wiener Klangstil” is not fixed, though the adherence to the fundamental principles of timbre and style does not change, and this fundamental principle of timbre governs the range of wind instruments found only in Vienna.

During the second half of the 19th century all orchestral instruments underwent modification in the interests of greater volume (sound energy). Increased technical demands also led to new designs of woodwind and brass instruments. In the end the valve trumpet and the double horn (invented by Ed. Kruspe in 1900) became the dominant forms.

What is striking is that where new designs made instruments easier to play, but at the expense of the palette of tone colour, such instruments were – and still are – rejected by the Viennese orchestras. This is especially true of the woodwind instruments. Despite the fact that Theobald Böhm’s improvements to instruments in the second half of the 19th century are in use throughout the world, the modern “Vienna oboe” is simply a modification of the instrument by the Dresden instrument maker Carl Golde (died 1873). The clarinet and bassoon are slight modifications to German designs, and only in the case of the flute did players, around 1930, gradually switch to the universally used Böhm model. One reason for this may be that, as with stringed instruments, the timbre of the flute largely depends on the player rather than the instrument.

Because variety of tone colour was considered paramount, the double horn, though easier to play and more secure, was not adopted by the Viennese orchestras. The Vienna horn is, in essence, the natural horn of the Viennese classical era with double piston valves added by the instrument maker Leopold Uhlmann (1806–1878). The trumpet, instead of having the almost universal Perinet piston valves, is the old German model with rotary valves, while the F tuba is its own instrument type. The trombone in Viennese orchestras is the usual type, although here, too, the preference is for the tonal quality of a narrower bore.

Unlike the wind instruments, 19th century modifications to the stringed instruments (stronger bass-bar, steeper angle to the fingerboard and higher bridge) had less effect on the sound produced, and was probably a reason why the new instruments were readily adopted in Vienna. Ultimately, the sound produced depends less on the instrument than on the playing technique, and therefore the player.

In 2002 M. Bertsch, with the participation around the world of over a thousand test persons, published the first scientific and statistically robust evidence to support the claim for a “Vienna sound style”. The task was a blind test to recognize the Vienna Philharmonic Orchestra using commercial CDs of the Vienna, Berlin and New York Philharmonic Orchestras with examples played to some 1,000 persons including non-playing listeners, amateur musicians, professional orchestral musicians and soloists, sound engineers, university music students and top international conductors, some of whom, like Zubin Mehta and Seiji Ozawa, were represented on the discs chosen. ″Viennese style of playing and interpretation is more important to shaping its overall sound than the unusual instruments used.″
