= List of horn makers =

The list of horn makers spans all time, and not all still exist.

- Andreas Jungwirth
- Atkinson Brass and Company
- Briz Horn Company
- Buescher Band Instrument Company
- C.G. Conn
- Christopher Cornford
- Daniel Rauch
- Dieter Otto
- Ed. Kruspe
- Engelbert Schmid
- F. E. Olds
- Finke
- Gebr. Alexander
- Hans Hoyer
- Herbert Fritz Knopf
- Holton
- Kalison
- KHS Musical Instruments
- Klaus Fehr
- Lewis & Duerk
- Lukas Horns
- Jacob Medlin, Apex, North Carolina
- Otto
- Patterson Hornworks
- Paxman Musical Instruments
- Ricco Kühn
- Stomvi
- Thein
- Woodhead Horns Ltd, UK
- Yamaha Corporation
