= Gregor Widholm =

Austrian academic and musician

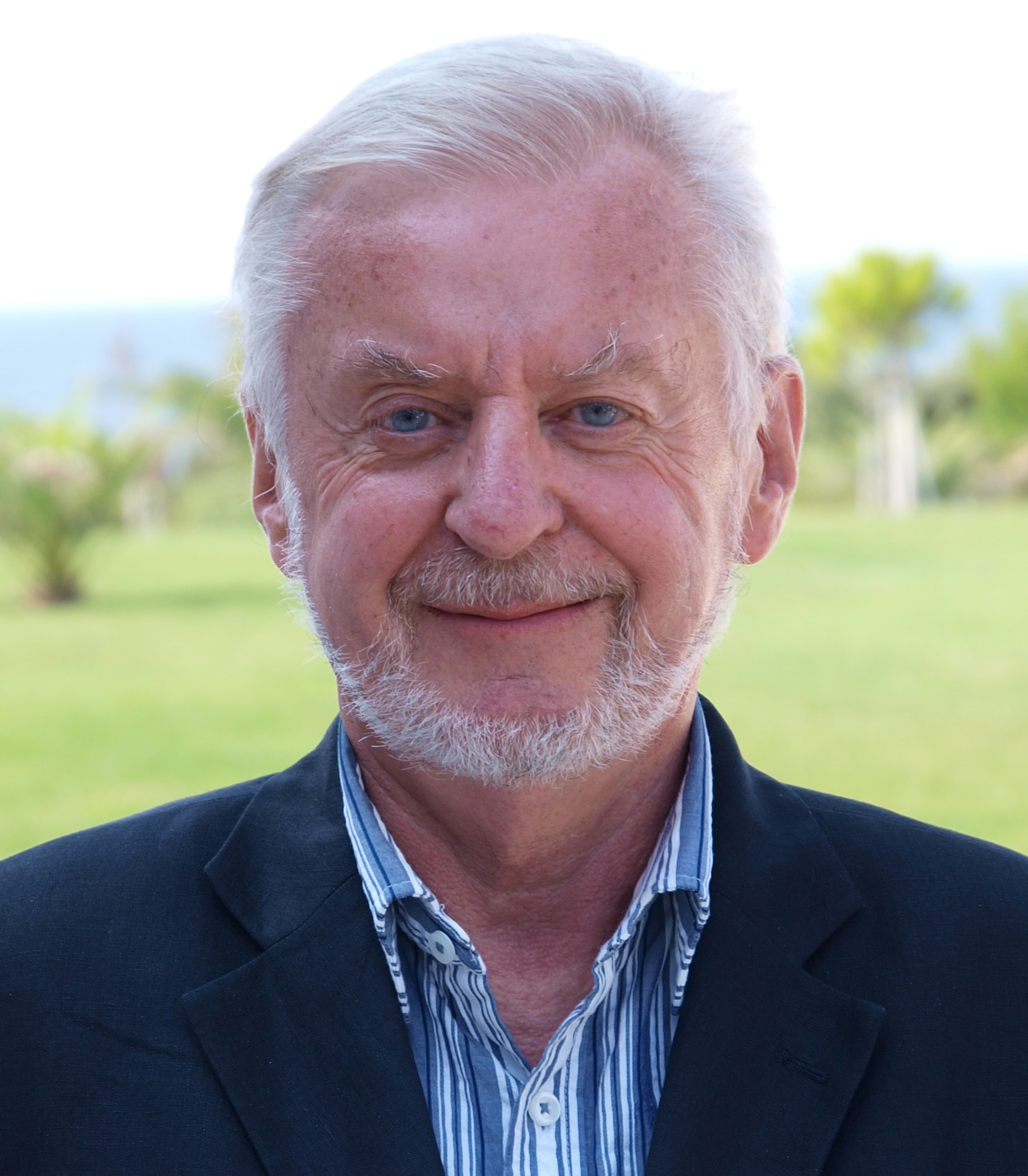

Gregor Widholm (born 1948 in Gänserndorf) is an Austrian academic and musician, and from 2007 to 2012 Vice-Rector of the University of Music and Performing Arts, Vienna (German: Universität für Musik und darstellende Kunst Wien).

== Education and career ==
Gregor Widholm studied horn with Prof. Friedrich Gabler at the University of Music and Performing Arts, Vienna (at the time: Akademie für Musik in Wien), communication technology at the Vienna University of Technology (at the time: Technische Hochschule Wien) and in 1968–1970 completed a special course in sound technology.

From 1971 to 2007 he was a member of the Symphony Orchestra of the Vienna Volksoper (German: Wiener Volksopernorchester). In 1979 he was assistant professor at the University of Music and Performing Arts Vienna, and in 1999 was appointed to the chair of musical acoustics, the first such chair in Austria. Since then he has held various academic positions in the university.

== Musical activity ==
As a member of the Vienna Volksoper he took part in some 5,000 opera and operetta performances, as well as many concerts and operas in Italy (Rome), Switzerland (Zürich), Netherlands (Amsterdam, Den Haag), USA (New York), Japan (Tokyo, Nagoya, Osaka, Kyoto, etc.), Hong Kong, Singapore, Thailand (Bangkok). Recordings included labels such as Polygram, Deutsche Grammophon, EMI, with artists such as L. Pavarotti, P. Domingo, E. Gruberova, E. Mathis.

From 1974 to 1986 he was a member of the Capella Academica Wien and the Ensemble Eduard Melkus. During this period he explored the natural horn and historically informed performance practice and techniques, mainly in chamber music and solo performance. Concerts – sometimes as soloist – in Vienna, Munich, Prague, Budapest, Rome, Milan, Venice, London, Oxford, Tokyo, Osaka, Hong Kong. Numerous recordings, sometimes as soloist, for Deutsche Grammophon, Amadeo, Nippon Columbia.

== Management activity ==
In 1978 he founded the concert association of the Orchestra of the Vienna Volksoper and was its manager until 1986. Activities included the orchestra's first concert tour to the Far East, the first appearance of a European orchestra in Singapore, the first appearance of an Austrian orchestra in Thailand; also the introduction of summer concerts by the Vienna State Opera and Volksoper and some 30 recording projects for the Orchestra of the Vienna Volksoper. In addition he was manager of the Capella Academica Wien from 1974 to 1991 for whom he arranged two complete concert series. In the academic sphere he organised numerous international academic symposiums and conferences, including the 92nd and 122nd AES Conventions in Vienna, attracting some 10,000 visitors and 200 technical presentations; he also conceived and realised numerous exhibitions and interactive computer installations.

== Research activity ==
In 1979 Gregor Widholm was invited to establish the Institut für Wiener Klangstil (IWK), as an institute of applied research in the field of musical acoustics with a focus, in particular, on the Viennese playing tradition, and on support for players and instrument makers. He was the first to apply digital measurement techniques to musical instruments and is regarded as having introduced musical acoustics in Austria. He directed development of the world's first computer system for analysing and improving the performance of brass instruments BIAS, now considered the international standard and in use worldwide. Systems for the quality evaluation of stringed and woodwind instruments followed. In 1999 The New York Times called him the musician's "Mr Wizard".

More than 80 presentations at professional conventions and symposiums, and some 90 publications in specialist national and international journals, encyclopedias and books. Several publications have been translated into French, Spanish, Portuguese, Hungarian, Polish, Japanese and Chinese language. Project director of 8 funded scientific research projects in the field of musical acoustics.

Membership of international academic and research bodies: Acoustical Society of America (ASA), European Acoustics Association (EAA), Audio Engineering Society (AES), International Commission for Acoustics (ICA), Life Member of the International Horn Society (IHS), Historic Brass Society (HBS), International Trumpet Guild (ITG), Catgut Acoustical Society (CAS), founder, president and chairman of the technical committee Musical Acoustics of the Austrian Acoustics Association (AAA); joint founder and member of the Acoustics division of the Österreichsche Physikalische Gesellschaft (ÖPG).
