= John Cerminaro =

American horn player (born 1947)

John Paul Cerminaro, Jr. (born April 7, 1947) is an American horn player who is best known for his principal tenures with two notable American orchestras, the New York Philharmonic and the Los Angeles Philharmonic. He was later principal horn of the Seattle Symphony Orchestra.

== Early life ==
Cerminaro was born in Grimes County, Texas, to John and Frances (Felder) Cerminaro, both public school music educators. He was raised in Dallas, where he studied horn with Alfred Resch. His solo debut performance came with the Dallas Symphony Orchestra at the age of 16. Following his graduation from Sunset High School in Dallas, Cerminaro studied at the Juilliard School, where he was awarded an Elsie and Walter W. Naumburg Scholarship. He was a student and later faculty member at the Aspen Music Festival.

== Career ==
In 1969 Cerminaro joined the New York Philharmonic under Leonard Bernstein. Other conductors he played under in New York include Erich Leinsdorf, Zubin Mehta and Pierre Boulez. In 1979 he accepted an offer from conductor Carlo Maria Giulini to join the Los Angeles Philharmonic; he performed there under the baton of André Previn as well. During Cerminaro's time in Los Angeles, many new compositions were written for him, including works by William Schuman, William Kraft, Rand Steiger, and Henri Lazarof. His tenure as principal horn in Seattle began in 1996 and ended in 2011. Cerminaro has been guest principal horn with a number of orchestras, including the Dallas Symphony, Milwaukee Symphony, and Houston Symphony Orchestras.

Cerminaro is a member of the International Horn Society and has contributed various articles to its periodical, The Horn Call.

He is married to Charlotte Lambert Cerminaro, who is also a professional horn player.
