= Kruspe =

Kruspe may refer to any of the following:

- Ed. Kruspe, a brass instrument manufacturer, founded by Carl Kruspe
- Carl Georg Kruspe, a German District Mayor (de)
- Richard Kruspe (born 1967), a German musician and guitarist
