= Daniel Rauch =

Norwegian builder of French horns

Daniel Rauch (born 10 April 1947) is a retired master builder of French horns located in Oslo, Norway. Horn players often consider his horns to be among the best in the world, and with only 432 horns produced in total they are very difficult to come across.
