= Douglas Hill (musician) =

American composer, author and horn soloist

Douglas Hill (born February 6, 1946) is an American composer, author and horn soloist. He was the professor of horn at the University of Wisconsin–Madison from 1974 to 2011, when he was replaced by Daniel Grabois. He has performed as a soloist with the Rochester Philharmonic, Madison Symphony Orchestra and New York City Ballet, among others, and also performs in chamber ensembles including the American Brass Quintet. He has made three solo recordings, as well as several recordings of chamber and orchestral music. Hill is one of twenty horn soloists reviewed in the book 20th Century Brass Soloists by Michael Meckna, which surveys both jazz and classical genres.

Hill served as president of the International Horn Society (IHS) from 1978 to 1981, and was elected an honorary member of the society in 2008. He also served as Chair of the Classical Music Division of the National Foundation for Advancement in the Arts. He has judged several competitions, including the Fischoff and Coleman Chamber Music Competitions, and the first International Horn Competition in Toulon, France.

== Writing and compositions ==
He has composed numerous works for the horn. He has written a number of instructional books Collected Thoughts on Teaching and Learning, Creativity, and Horn Performance, Extended Techniques for the Horn: A Practical Handbook for Students, Performers, and Composers, High Range for the Horn Player, From Trills to Tremolo to Vibrato, and Warm-ups and Maintenance Sessions for the Horn Player. The IHS calls his teaching works "classics of horn pedagogy".
