= List of horn techniques =

Some of these horn techniques are not unique to the horn, but are applicable to most or all wind instruments.

== Stopped horn ==
This is the act of fully closing off the bell of the instrument with either the right hand or a special stopping mute. This results in producing a somewhat nasal sound. When required, in the sheet music the usual notation is a '+' above the note followed by a 'o' above notes that are to be played open. For longer stopped passages, the word indicating a stopped horn is written out.

The pitch lowers gradually when the hand is placed in the bell and slowly moved inward. When the bell is completely covered (stopped), the pitch falls to a half-step above the next lower partial (harmonic). For example, playing a middle C (F-horn, open) and gradually covering the bell into stopped horn, the pitch will lower a major 3rd to A♭ (or 1/2 step above G, the next lower partial). However, playing a 3rd space C (F-horn, open) and repeating the stopped horn, the pitch will lower a half-step to a B-natural (or 1/2 step above B♭, the next lower partial). The hand horn technique developed in the classical period, with music pieces requiring the use of covering the bell to various degrees to lower the pitch accordingly. Mozart's four Horn Concertos, Concert Rondo and Morceau de Concert were written with this technique in mind, as was the music both Beethoven and Brahms wrote for the horn.

Some modern composers have incorrectly notated that the horn is to bend an open pitch upward to a stopped pitch. This is impossible. The horn pitch can only be bent downward into a stopped pitch. It is believed that players play the next harmonic higher without realising and this has given rise to this erroneous belief.

There is also an effect that is occasionally called for, usually in French music, called "echo horn", "hand mute" or "sons d'écho" (see Dukas's The Sorcerer's Apprentice) which is like stopped horn, but different in that the bell is not closed as tightly. The player closes the hand enough so that the pitch drops 1/2 step, but, especially in the middle register, this is not closed as tightly as for stopped horn. Consequently, when playing echo horn, the player fingers one half step higher.

Also, the hand can be partially inserted into the bell in such a fashion as to lower the pitch of the horn one quarter tone, an extended technique used in some modern compositions today such as Blue Shades by Frank Ticheli.

== Handhorn technique ==
Before the advent of the valve horn, a player would increase the number of playable notes beyond the normal harmonic series by changing the position of his/her hand in the bell. It is possible to use a combination of stopping, hand-muting (3/4 stopping), and half-stopping (to correct notes that would otherwise be out of tune) to play almost every note of a mid-range chromatic scale on one fingering. Most modern pieces for hand-horn tend to spend more time in the higher ranges, as there are more notes that can be played naturally (without altering hand position and maintaining pure tone) above the 8th note of any harmonic series. The most well known natural hornist virtuoso who was in the classical period was Giovanni Punto, which is said to have been able to play 'anything' on his natural horn.

== Transposition ==
Many older pieces for horn were written for a horn not keyed in F as is standard today. As a result, a requirement for modern orchestra hornists is to be able to read music directly in these keys. This is most commonly done by transposing the music on the fly into F. A reliable way to transpose is to liken the written notes (which rarely deviate from written C, D, E, F, G, and occasionally A) to their counterparts in the scale the F horn will be playing in.

Commonly seen transpositions include:

- B♭ alto — up a perfect fourth
- A — up a major third
- G — up a major second
- E — down a minor second
- E♭ — down a major second (used for horn on pitches with multiple sharps until Richard Strauss)
- D — down a minor third
- C — down a perfect fourth
- B♭ basso — down a perfect fifth

Some less common transpositions include:

- A♭ alto — up a minor third (used in Schubert's 4th symphony, 2nd movement)
- F♯ — up a minor second
- D♭ — down a major third (used in some works by Berlioz, Verdi and Strauss)
- B — down a tritone (used by Brahms and Schumann)

It has been speculated that one of the reasons Brahms wrote for horn in the awkward key of B(♮) was to encourage the horn players to use the natural horn; he did not like the sound of the new valved horns and wrote all his horn parts playable for natural horn, same as Carl Maria von Weber did.

Sometimes it is unclear as to whether a piece should be transposed up or down (i.e. B♭ alto versus B♭ basso when only B♭ is written). Various factors can be taken into account when choosing e.g. which direction keeps the music in the horn's normal range. Also the history of the composer can be used. For Haydn symphonies which include trumpet parts, the lower transposition for the horns is usually correct; otherwise, the high transposition is usually correct. Sometimes multiple pitches were used to get a greater number of available tones. This is especially true for works in minor keys to be able to play the minor third (e.g. Mozart's Symphony No. 40).

== Double and triple tonguing ==
Multiple tonguing a technique used when passages of notes are too quick for a single tongue. Normal tonguing consists of interrupting the air stream by tapping the back of the front teeth with the tongue as said in the syllables 'da', 'ta', 'doo', or 'too'. Double tonguing consists of alternating between the 'ta' and the 'ka' sounds or between the 'da' and 'ga' sounds. The tongue makes the same movement as if the player is repeatedly saying 'kitty' or 'ticket.' Triple tonguing is most used for patterns of three notes and is made with the syllables 'ta-ta-ka', 'ta-ka-ta', or 'da-ga-da.'

== Lip trill ==
A lip trill is a rapid oscillation between neighboring harmonics - used primarily for whole-step trills from second-line G up approximately an octave. Lip trills are possible both lower and higher, but much lower than E and the harmonics are too far apart for a whole step, and much higher and harmonics are too narrow. Many books give fingering charts for lip trills, but the double horn gives further options. In his book "The Horn", Barry Tuckwell also gives a fingering chart of possible 'faux' 1/2 step lip trills.

== Multiphonics ==
Multiphonics is the act of producing more than one pitch simultaneously on the horn. To do this, one note is produced as normal while another is sung. One of its earliest uses occurs in the Concertino for Horn and Orchestra by Carl Maria von Weber (Norman del Mar believed these chords to be impossible to play).

Another kind of multiphonics can be achieved by simultaneously playing two neighbouring notes of the harmonic series.

== Fake high C ==
On some horns, usually Kruspe wrap horns, a high C can sound out while pressing the first valve of the F side down halfway.
