= Engelbert Schmid =

Engelbert Schmid is a classical musician and horn maker.

After playing with the Berlin Radio Symphony Orchestra and the Berlin Philharmonic, solo-horn with the Munich Radio Orchestra for ten years, in 1980 Engelbert Schmid exhibited his Horns for the first time. In 1990 he established his own workshop. As a Master Craftsman he personally trained his present instrument makers.
