= Jagdsinfonie =

Musical work by Leopold Mozart

The Jagdsinfonie or Sinfonia da Caccia for 4 Horns and Strings is a work by Leopold Mozart in the key of G major. It is scored for corni di caccia, or hunting horns, strings, and gunshots, a naturalism not atypical of this composer. Some performances add the recorded sounds of shouts and barking dogs.

There are three movements:

1. Allegro
2. Andante più tosto un poco allegretto a gusto d'un Echo
3. Menuetto

== Sources ==
- Archive of the Gesellschaft der Musikfreunde, Vienna (ms. nr. 13/23533)
- Fürstlich Öttingen-Wallersteinsche Bibliothek in Harburg (ms. nr. III, 4°, 1/2 4 537)
