= Ed. Kruspe =

Brass instrument manufacturer

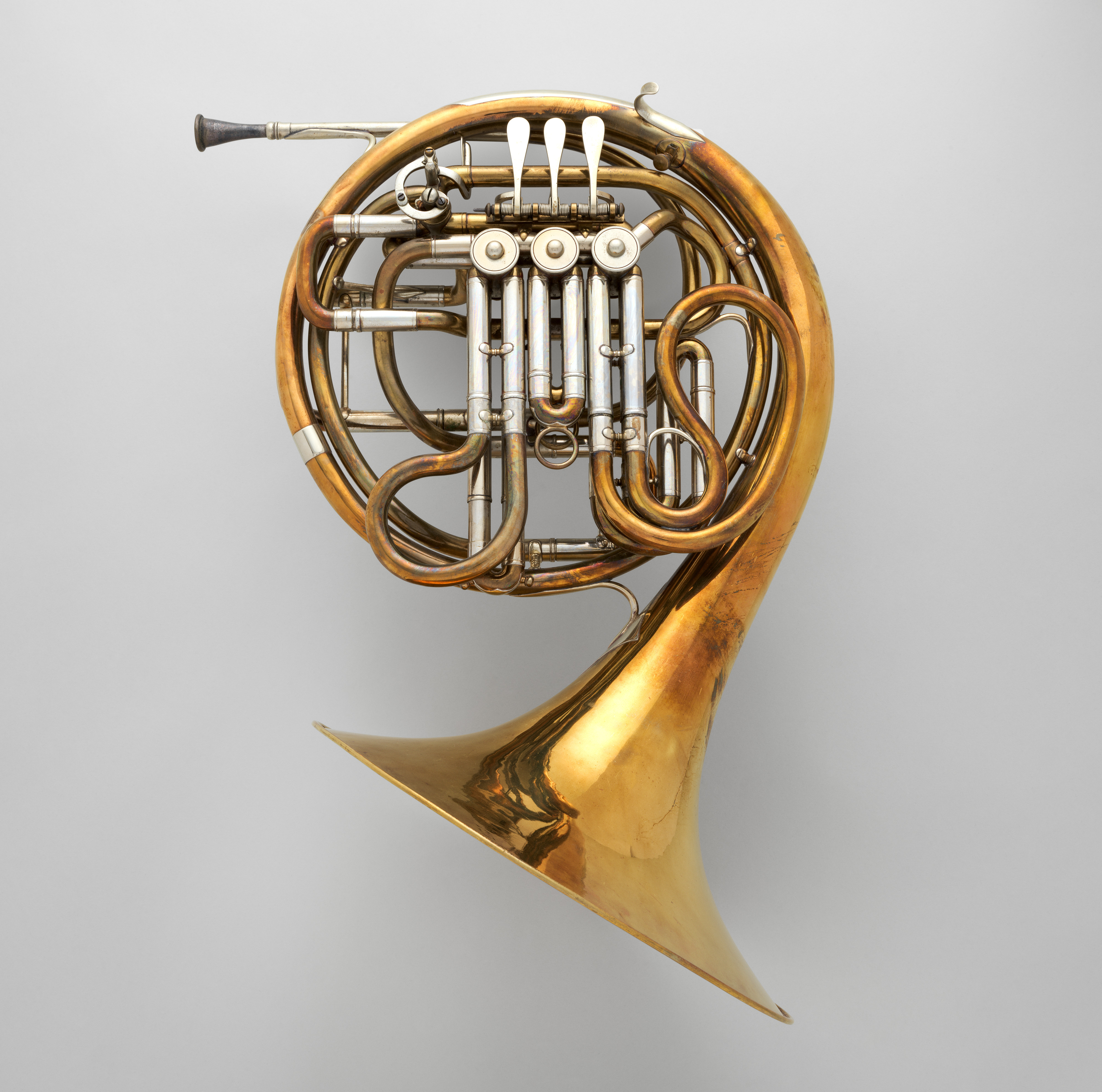
French Horn made by Kruspe, c. 1904–19.

Eduard Kruspe is a brass instrument manufacturer located near Eisenach, Germany. It was founded in 1834 by Carl Kruspe and his two sons Eduard and Friedrich (Fritz) in Erfurt, Prussia, and few years after German reunification the factory moved from Erfurt to Wutha-Farnroda near Eisenach . The factory in Wutha-Farnroda (Thuringia) closed in 2011. But the manufacture of Kruspe brass wind instruments is continued since 2012 in Prienbach (Bavaria).

Ed. Kruspe is credited with building the first prototypes of the double horn in 1897.

The double horn was conceived by Edmund Gumpert, third horn in Meiningen, and refined and patented around 1900 by Fritz Kruspe. In 1904, the Horner model was introduced for the Philadelphia Orchestra hornist Anton Horner. Later copied by C.G. Conn as Conn 8D, based on Horner model.

The Kruspe shop is also widely known for their trombones, and older specimens are often considered prime examples of the classic German Konzertposaune.
