= International Horn Society =

- Founded: 1970
- Type: Music
- Headquarters: United States
- Website: hornsociety.org

The International Horn Society (IHS) is an international organization dedicated to players of the horn founded in June 1970. Its goal is to promote horn playing, education and fellowship. The society aims to bring together horn players, educators, and enthusiasts from around the world to share knowledge and experience. It has over 3500 members from 55 countries.

The society's activities include holding workshops, lectures, and seminars that are open to the public, publishing a journal and newsletters that feature materials related to the horn. The IHS encourages composers and arrangers to write music featuring the horn, and fosters competitions for new repertoire featuring the horn, including the Meir Rimon Commissioning Assistance Grant Project. According to the academic Erin Mullen, writing in 2004, the society's efforts to encourage composition, "along with the more personal endeavors of a few enterprising composers, have greatly increased the number of high-quality works written for the horn in recent years".

It holds an annual symposium, and publishes a journal, The Horn Call. It established and maintains an archive and research facility pertaining to the horn. The society also works closely with music teachers and presents honors and recognition for distinctive service relating to the horn.

One of the first actions of the society, under the presidency of Barry Tuckwell, was to promote the use of the English word "horn" rather than "French horn" for the instrument.
