= Karl Haas (conductor) =

German musician and conductor

Karl Wilhelm Jacob Haas (27 December 1900 – 7 July 1970) was a German musician, musicologist and conductor. He was born in Karlsruhe, Germany, where he studied at the Classical College, then at the Universities of Munich and Heidelberg.

His first work was at the Dumont Theatre in Düsseldorf; then as Music advisor for Karlsruhe and Stuttgart radio stations. He escaped Nazi persecution of Jews and settled in Britain in 1939. He worked as Music Director of Old Vic in Bristol, where he composed incidental music and stage scores.

Karl was an enthusiast of Baroque music and a player of the viola d'amore. He edited works of Cherubini, Boccherini, Dittersdorf, Handel, Haydn and others. According to Lionel Salter, when Haas founded the London Baroque Ensemble in 1941 he incorporated 'Baroque' into the name "with his impish sense of humour", and an acknowledgment that the term can also mean 'bizarre'. The ensemble's repertoire extended well beyond the Baroque period.

The London Baroque Ensemble made its public debut in 1943 at the National Gallery, and continued to play until 1966. Members of the Ensemble between 1952 and 1954 included Sidney Sutcliffe, Terence MacDonagh, Natalie James (aka Natalie Caine), Roger Lord on oboe; Frederick Thurston, Jack Brymer, Gervase de Peyer, Basil Tschaikov on clarinet; Cecil James, Paul Draper, Edward Wilson on bassoons; James O'Loughlin on contra-bassoon; Dennis Brain, Neill Sanders, Ian Beers on horns; Vivian Joseph (cellist) on cello; and James Merritt on double-bass. They have accompanied keyboardists Lionel Salter, Charles Spinks and George Malcolm in works of J. S. Bach and C. P. E. Bach. They made a number of recordings of Handel, Bach, Boyce, Mozart and Dvorak, some produced by George Martin.

According to Basil Tschaikov, Karl Haas was a fine instrumentalist but a poor conductor. This was evidenced when playing the Richard Strauss Sonatina No 2 for the BBC on two occasions, as the second was by far the better performance. The difference was attributed to his taking a fall after the first, which left his arms in a sling.

A recording containing Dvořák's Serenade in D minor Op. 44, Mozart's Serenade No. 11 in E flat, K.375 and Serenade No. 12 in C minor, K.388/384a is available on the Testament label. Other recordings of the London Baroque Ensemble were made on the Westminster label, now part of Deutsche Grammophon, Parlophone, Decca and Pye.

He had been working on a book 300 Years of Military Music at the time of his death, 7 July 1970 in London.

== Bibliography ==
- The Concise Oxford Dictionary of Music (1996 edition). Michael Kennedy and Joyce Bourne, 2007, ISBN 978-0199203833
