= Albert Fransella =

Flautist (1865–1935)

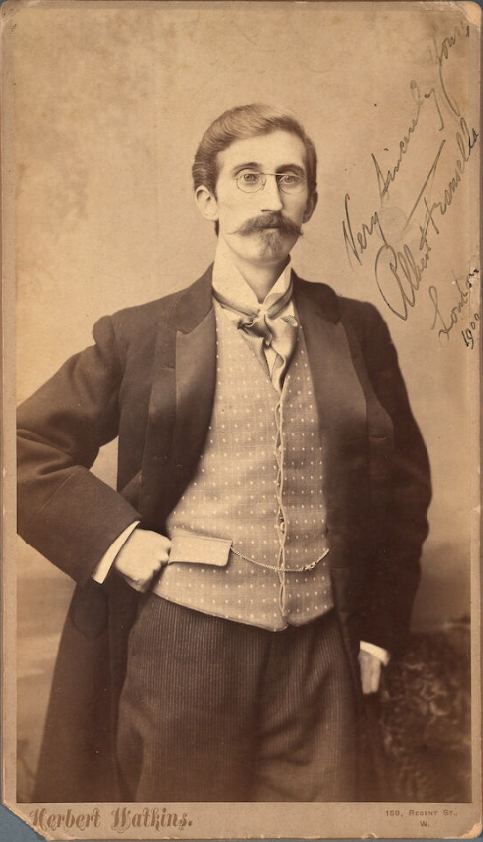

Background information
- Born: Albert Lucas Fransella; 17 March 1865; Amsterdam, The Netherlands
- Died: 7 March 1935 (aged 69) Nevern Place, Earl's Court, Kensington, Middlesex.
- Genre: Classical
- Occupations: Musician, professor
- Instrument: Flute

Albert Fransella (17 March 1865 – 7 March 1935) was a virtuoso flutist and principal flutist of Dutch and British orchestras between 1880 and 1925.

== Biography ==
Fransella was born in Amsterdam of Dutch parentage but Swiss extraction. His mother died when Fransella was just one year old. Fransella only had one lung. Despite this, he learnt to play the flute, and piano, from his father Jacob, a professor of music, and Jacques de Jong, flautist to the King of Holland. At fifteen he appeared at a concert given for Frederick Francis II, Grand Duke of Mecklenburg-Schwerin and was, at that time, second flute in one of the Amsterdam Orchestras. A year later he was appointed as first flute with the Utrecht Orchestra. In 1881 he played for Johannes Brahms, who was enthusiastic about Fransella's playing, saying that a brilliant career lay before the youth. He came to England from The Netherlands in 1884 at the age of nineteen when he was appointed as principal flautist with the Scottish Orchestra, Glasgow. He first appeared in London under Jules Riviere's Promenade Concerts at Covent Garden.

In 1888 he returned to Holland to join the newly formed Concertgebouw in Amsterdam as their first solo flautist. He performed no less than eleven times as solo flautist with the orchestra under Willem Kes, playing such repertoire as Doppler's L'oiseau des bois, op. 21, for flute and four horns, Saint-Saëns's Tarantella, Joachim Andersen's Wien Neerlands bloed, op. 35 (Fantasy on a Dutch folk hymn), and Edward de Jong's Faust Fantasy. He returned to England in late 1891.

He then became the leading player in England, replacing Oluf Svendsen when he retired as first flute in the Crystal Palace Orchestra in 1892(at the time the only full-time symphony orchestra in London), before he was invited to become first flute in Henry Wood's newly founded Queen's Hall Orchestra in 1895. He later became the principal flute of the Philharmonic Society Orchestra, playing with them until 1925 when he was succeeded by Robert Murchie. In 1893 he began teaching at the Guildhall School of Music in London. He was a professor there until 1915. He also taught at Trinity College of Music in London. Amongst his students was Gerald Jackson, who was first flute in the London Philharmonic Orchestra under Sir Thomas Beecham. He also taught Ary van Leeuwen, Emil Medicus, Marguerite de Forest-Anderson, Edgar Hunt, Joseph Emile Slater and Holger Gilbert-Jespersen.

Fransella had the distinction of being a soloist at the first Henry Wood Promenade concert on 10 August 1895, playing two movements from the Suite de Trois Morceaux by Benjamin Godard. In the same year, he commissioned the instrument makers Rudall Carte & Co., to make him a gold flute. He first used the new flute at a recital at the Queen's Hall in 1896. He played at the Promenade concerts no less than 356 times from 1895 until 1918, becoming one of the players that the audience liked to spot and personally welcome to the stage.

In 1898 Fransella organised a concert at the Queen's (small) Hall to show off four flutes which he had commissioned from Rudall Carte. At the concert, the Fransella Flute Quartet premiered two works by Thomas Harrison Frewin, a composer and the first violin in Henry Wood's Queens' Hall Orchestra. The concert also included new works by Ernesto Köhler and Albert Ketèlbey. In 1900 and 1901 as conductor, musical director and manager of the summer theatre at Ranelagh Gardens, Felixstowe, he directed his own series of promenade concerts with his own orchestra.

He played with the Queen's Hall Wind Quintet, founded in 1902 alongside Désiré Lalande (oboe), Manuel Gomez (clarinet), Frederick James (bassoon) and Adolf Borsdorf (horn).

Fransella was to give and present many first performances of works by the twentieth century's great composers. On 13 March 1899, at an Albert Fransella Chamber Concert, there was the first performance of Delius’s Seven Songs from the Norwegian, at the Queen's (Small) Hall with Minna Fischer.

Fransella gave the first English performance of Debussy's Prélude à l'après-midi d'un faune at a Promenade concert with the Queen's Hall Orchestra on 20 August 1904.

Such was his fame, that in 1906 a caricature appeared of Fransella entitled The Paganini of the Flute in the Illustrated Sporting and Dramatic News. This title was repeated in subsequent reviews. Fransella was to have many such laudations to describe his playing during his career: …no player can equal Mr. Fransella, virtuoso of the flute. Henry Wood referred to him as, 'That great flautist'. He also received high praise for his conducting and pianistic skills.

In May 1906, Fransella played at a Bach Memorial concert in the Aeolian Hall, to raise funds for the purchase of Bach's house in Eisenach and for the endowment of a Bach Museum. The following month, in June 1906, at the Broadwood Concert Room, he gave the British premiere of the York Bowen Suite for Flute and Piano, which Bowen dedicated to Fransella, with the composer at the piano. He played the work again later in the year at the Promenade Concerts at the Queen's Hall. At the June concert, Fransella also performed with his new quartet, consisting of Ferdinand Weist-Hill on violin, Jacques Renard on cello and Jacques Presburg on piano. In 1907 he co-founded the music publishers Stainer & Bell with Richard Henry Walthew a colleague at the Guildhall School of Music, Sydney Bransgrove and others. He edited several publications and published several of his own compositions via this publishing house. He premiered the 1907 Idyll by Walthew, published by Stainer and Bell, with the pianist Frederick B. Kiddle at a Queen's Hall Prom in September 1907.

In May 1908, Fransella appeared alongside the greatest performers of the age at the Albert Hall in London. The concert in aid of the League of Mercy, with invitations issued by the Prince and Princess of Wales, included such artists as Enrico Caruso, John McCormack, Efrem Zimbalist, Nellie Melba and Antonio Scotti.

On 9 September 1909 he gave the premiere of Carl Reinecke's flute concerto in London.

Fransella was the first flute player to be a named recording artist and accompanied the great sopranos Luisa Tetrazzini, Nellie Melba, Ellen Beach Yaw, Evangeline Florence, Alice Esty, Ruth Vincent, Dorothy Silk,Adelina Patti, Christina Nilsson Emma Albani, Mademoiselle Dolores and Mignon Nevada. Fransella named the fourth of his seven children Ella Melba Fransella, after the great soprano. Fransella had performed with Melba to great acclaim in a June concert in 1894.

La perle du Brésil: Charmant oiseau
This performance of 1908 includes singing by Ruth Vincent with flute obbligato by Albert Fransella (2:47).

Fransella married Ella Marie Brennen in 1889 and they had seven children. Their first son, Henri, was a fine flautist who played in the Queen's Hall Orchestra and Covent Garden and as a soloist, as well as playing alongside his father at several concerts.

In 1912 Albert and Henri accompanied the first performance of Régine Wieniawski's A Poor Young Shepherd, sung by her husband Sir Aubrey Dean Paul (under his stage name of Edward Ramsey) with Wieniawski on piano. Henri died young aged only 27.

In 1912 Albert founded the first Fransella Trio with Marjorie Hayford on violin and Winifred Christie on piano. He also played with the Hamilton Harty Trio (with Hamilton Harty, piano and J.L Fonteyne, oboe) and the Hamilton Harty Sextet. The sextet made their debut on 2 November 1911, performing the English premiere of Rimsky Korsakov's Piano and Wind Quintet, amongst other works. He was director of the London Wind sextet, the Fransella quartet and of the two Fransella Trios.

As well as his many Proms appearances, Fransella played in numerous recitals. In 1913 he presented a series of four recitals and included the best, and most popular, pieces of the flute repertoire. The performances included works by Joachim Anderson, J.S. Bach, Alfredo Casella, Cécile Chaminade, Katherine Eggar, Philippe Gaubert, Mozart, Susan Spain-Dunk, Carl Reinecke and Theodor Verhey.

Fransella, performing alongside Harry Waldo Warner on viola and Miriam Timothy on harp, gave the first public performance of Debussy's Trio for Flute, Viola and Harp at the Aeolian Hall on 2 February 1917.

On 26 March 1917, the Oriana Madrigal Society presented a concert at the Aeolian Hall which included the first performance of Arnold Bax's Elegiac Trio for Flute, Viola and Harp. Fransella, Harry Waldo Warner and Miriam Timothy were the performers. Fransella, at the same concert, gave a performance of the Four Dances for flute and piano, with Harriet Cohen, that Bax had rescued from his ballet Tamara. Later that year, Fransella gave the first performance of Dora Bright's Suite Bretonne with the Queen's Hall Orchestra and Henry Wood at the Proms.

In 1918, Fransella and a number of renowned musicians including Albert Sammons, Emile Sauret, William Murdoch, York Bowen, John Ireland, Eugène Goossens, Arnold Bax, Lionel Tertis, Felix Salmond and Walter Hyde sought to establish a new music conservatoire in London. It was to be known as the International Conservatoire of Music. The Belgian musician Emile de Vlieger was to be a co-director with Alfonso Marconi and Mrs Godfrey Isaacs as financial backers. The proposed conservatoire did not come to fruition.

Fransella was still considered the best player in England in 1919 when Gerald Jackson, the future first flute of Beecham's London Philharmonic Orchestra, became his pupil. On 6 October 1920, Fransella gave the first performance of Arthur Bliss's Rhapsody, for wordless soprano, tenor and chamber ensemble, at a Gerald Cooper Concert at the Mortimer Hall, London. The performers were: Dorothy Helmrich (soprano), Gerald Cooper (tenor), Albert Fransella (flute), Mr. Hinchcliffe (clarinet), the Wadsworth Quartet and double bass. Later that year, on 15 December 1920, Fransella gave the first performance of Arthur Bliss's Rout, for wordless soprano and chamber ensemble, at the Piccadilly (London) home of Baroness d'Erlanger. The performers were: Grace Crawford (soprano), Albert Fransella (flute), Charles Draper (clarinet), J. H. Plowman (percussion), Gwendolen Mason (harp), Philharmonic Quartet and Claude Hobday (double bass). The performance was conducted by Arthur Bliss.

Between the years 1924 and 1926, Fransella played for the British Broadcasting Company. At the Wigmore Hall on 24 March 1924, Fransella and the oboist Léon Goossens, gave the first performance of Eugene Goossens’s, Pastorale et Arlequinade for Flute, Oboe and Piano. Fransella, alongside Léon Goossens and Harry Berly gave the premiere of Gustav Holst’s Terzetto for flute, oboe and viola at the Faculty of Arts Gallery in Golden Square, London, in March 1926. The work was then given its first broadcast by the same performers in June 1926. Holst's Terzetto was dedicated to Fransella who had other works dedicated to him by Joachim Anderson (Etudes Techniques Op.63) and Leonardo De Lorenzo (The Two Virtuosos). At the Wigmore Hall in February of 1928, Fransella, with the oboist Helen Gaskell and the pianist Bertram Harrison, gave the first performance of Ethel Smyth's Variations on Bonny Sweet Robin, (Ophelia's Song) (1927) which was dedicated to Fransella.

He was the foreign correspondent in England for the American The Flutist magazine, a monthly flute journal published by Emil Medicus between 1920 and 1929.

Fransella formed the Philharmonic Trio in 1925. The pianist was firstly Geoffrey O'Connor Morris, followed soon after by Francesco Ticciati. The oboist in the trio was Léon Goossens. In 1928 Fransella's place was taken by Robert Murchie.

== Final years ==
Fransella undertook a largely unsuccessful extended tour of South Africa in 1928 and returned to England in the autumn of 1930 in straitened circumstances. In what may have been his last public concert, in February 1934 at The Ballet Club in London, as part of the Macnaghten-Lemare concert series, focusing on New works by young English composers, Fransella performed John Locke's Quintet for Flute, Oboe, Clarinet, Violin, and Cello (1932). Also performed that evening were works of the same instrumentation by Robin Milford, Christian Darnton, and Walter Leigh. The oboist that evening was Sylvia Spencer; the clarinettist was Alan Frank. Fransella made few recitals after this date and in early March 1935, just ten days before his 70th birthday, he committed suicide in London, after a severe illness.

Albert Fransella is remembered in the Musicians' Book of Remembrance in the Musician's Chapel within the Church of the Holy Sepulchre, (The Musicians' Church) in London.

== Recordings ==
=== Columbia recordings ===
- Villanelle. Ruth Vincent – Female vocal solo, with flute (Albert Fransella) and piano. Columbia 3358. (12-in.). Recorded late 1905 and March 1906
- La perle du Bresil (David): Charmant oiseau. Ruth Vincent (soprano), Albert Fransella (flute). Columbia 133 A5077.
- Handel, Sweet bird. Ruth Vincent – Soprano vocal solo, with flute obbligato. (A.Fransella) Columbia A5086 (6016). Recorded c.1908
- Handel, Sweet bird. Ruth Vincent – Soprano vocal solo, with flute obbligato. (A.Fransella) Columbia 6016. (12-in.) Recorded c.1908
- Charmant oiseau. Ruth Vincent – Soprano vocal solo, with flute obbligato. (A.Fransella) Columbia 6017. (12-in.) Recorded c.1908
- Lo! Here the gentle lark. Ruth Vincent – Soprano vocal solo, with flute obbligato. (A.Fransella) Columbia 6018. (12-in.) Recorded c.1908
- Godard's valse. Albert Fransella (flute) Columbia 27294. (10-in.) Recorded c.1911
- The Wren. Albert Fransella (flute) Columbia 27295. (10-in.) Recorded c.1911
- Weel may the keel row. Albert Fransella (piccolo) Columbia 27296. (10-in.) Recorded c.1911
- Paggi, Remembranz Napoletane. Albert Fransella (flute) Columbia 27307. (10-in.) Recorded c.1911
- Carnival of Venice, with variations. Albert Fransella (flute) Columbia 27308. (10-in.) Recorded c.1911
- Will o' the wisp. Albert Fransella (piccolo) Columbia 27309. (10-in.) Recorded c.1911

=== Other recordings ===
- Gaetano Donizetti, Lucia di Lammermoor – Mad Scene:Splendon le sacre faci. Luisa Tetrazzini, Albert Fransella. Percy Pitt (cond.) Gramophone 2176f. 053144, Victor 92018. (12-inch) Recorded 12/20/1907
- Donizetti, Spargi d’amaro pianto (Mad Scene), Lucia di Lammermoor. Tetrazzini (with flute obbl. by Albert Fransella) His Master's Voice 2-053047 (12-inch)
- Donizetti, Lucia di Lammermoor – Ardon gl' incensi. Luisa Tetrazzini (flute obbl. by Albert Fransella with Orch.) His Master's Voice DB535 (12-inch)
- Lo, hear the gentle lark. Nellie Melba – Soprano vocal solo, with piano and flute (A. Fransella) Gramophone 521c. (12-inch) Recorded 9/5/1905
- Godard, Suite de Trois Morceaux. A Fransella (flute). Gramophone 9197. Recorded 1907.
- Le Thière, Sylvia. A. Fransella (piccolo solo). Gramophone 9006 19/1/1899
- L.Bousquet, L'Oiseau Bleu. Mr. A. Fransella (flute). Gramophone – 9007 Shellac, 7", 78 RPM, S/Sided. Recorded 11/19/1899
- Vogelsang. Flute solo – A. Fransella Gramophone E9156X 19/1/1899
- Meyerbeer, L'étoile du nord. Ellen Beach Yaw, A. Fransella. Gramophone & Typewriter 33105 1657. Recorded 3/18/1899
- V.Massé, Les noces de Jeannette:Le chant du rossignol. Ellen Beach Yaw, A. Fransella. Gramophone & Typewriter 33106 1660. 3/18/1899
- Foster, Stephen Collins. Old folks at home, or, Swanee River. Fransella Flute Quartet; Albert Fransella. E. Berliner 9160. 78 rpm, mono; 7 in. Released 1 Nov 1901.
- Paderewski, Minuet. Fransella Flute Quartet; Albert Fransella. Gramophone 9192.
- Tchaikovsky, Chant sans paroles. Fransella Flute Quartet; Albert Fransella. Gramophone 9193.
- Mendelssohn, The bees’ wedding. Fransella Flute Quartet; Albert Fransella. Gramophone 9194.
- Serenade / The Swan. Alfred Kastner and A. Fransella. The Herald Gramophone Record 113. (Shellac, 10-inch) Recorded 1914
- Damare, The Wren / Sylvia. Albert Fransella. John Bull Record 40621/40622 (Shellac, 10-inch)
- The Laughing Cavalier / Valse. Harry Thornton (baritone), Mr. A. Fransella (flute). Albion Record 1126 (Shellac, 10-inch)
- Damare, The Wren; Carte, Weel May the Keel Row; Albert Fransella (Piccolo). Regal Records. G6216 10-inch.
- Demersseman, Carnival of Venice with Variations. A. Fransella, flute; Brockett, Will o’ the Wisp. A. Fransella, Piccolo. Regal Records, G6217, 10-inch.
- Donizetti, Gaetano. Lucia – Mad Scene. Luisa Tetrazzini, Albert Fransella. (Shellac, 12", S/Sided) Victor Red Seal. 89001.
- B. Godard, Valse. G. Paggi, Rimembranz Napoletane. (Shellac, 10") Columbia-Rena Record. 1674. Recorded 1911
- In Cellar Cool / Valse. Mr. A. Taylor (clarionet) / Mr. A. Fransella. (flute) (Shellac, 10-inch) Albion / Beka-Grand-Record. 236. Recorded 1910.
- B. Godard, Valse Brillante. Albert Fransella (flute). Neophone 17259. December 1906

== References and sources ==
=== Sources ===
==== Books ====
- De Lorenzo, Leonardo (1951). My Complete Story of The Flute. New York: The Citadel Press Inc.
- Elkin, Robert (1946). Royal Philharmonic. London: Rider and Company.
- Foreman, Lewis (1988). Bax: a composer and his times. Aldershot, UK: Scolar. ISBN 978-1843832096.
- Foreman, Lewis (1980). Arthur Bliss, catalogue of the complete works. Sevenoaks: Novello. ISBN 978-0853600695.
- Foster, Myles Birket (1912). History of the Philharmonic society of London 1813-1912. London: John Lane.
- Jacobs, Arthur (1994). Henry J. Wood : maker of the Proms. London: Methuen. ISBN 978-0413683908.
- Macaulay Fitzgibbon, Henry (1914). The story of the flute. London: Walter Scott.
- Powell, Ardel (2002). The Flute. New Haven: Yale University Press. ISBN 978-0300094985.
- Saxe Wyndham, H. (1913). Who’s who in Music. Boston: Small, Maynard and Company.
- Short, Michael (1974). Gustav Holst, 1874-1934 : a centenary documentation. London: White Lion.
- Strong, L.A.C. (1941). John Mccormack The Story Of A Singer. New York: The Macmillan Company.
- Thompson, Kenneth (1973). A Dictionary of Twentieth Century Composers, (1911–1971). New York: St. Martin’s Press.
- Weston, Pamela (1976). The clarinet teacher's companion. London: Hale.
- Zicari, Massimo (2022). The Voice of the Century: The Culture of Italian Bel Canto in Luisa Tetrazzini’s Recorded Interpretations. ISBN 9781800643338.

==== Journals ====
- Bigio, Robert (June 1994). "Albert Fransella – The Paganini of the Flute". Pan – The Journal of the British Flute Society. 12 (2): 19–25.
