= List of compositions by Percy Pitt =

Although most of Percy Pitt's compositions seem to have been performed during his lifetime, not everything was published; and not every published work received an opus number. Many of his works were published by Augener, who also published Bridge, Delius and Ireland. A partial list of Pitt's published compositions (both with and without opus numbers) appears in Pazdírek & 1904-1910 (34 volumes, published between 1904 and 1910). Some works appear to have been given an opus number after the volume was published some time before 1910. However, gaps still apparently remain in the sequence of opus numbers, e.g. Op. 2, 7, 12, 13 etc. (Note: Opus 32 was used for the Oriental Rhapsody, Op. 32a, and for Behold the Name of the Lord, Op. 32 no. 2, although information on Op. 32 no. 1 is not forthcoming. Op. 33 seems to have been used twice.) Nevertheless, the opus numbers seem to have been chronologically assigned in approximate composition order.

A number of works exist both in versions for orchestra and for piano reduction (solo or duet), and the dates assigned to many of the entries in this incomplete list should be treated with caution.

According to his own introduction in Pitt's biography, Henry Wood gave the first performances of most of Pitt's major works after 1896 except the G minor Sinfonietta which was written at the request of Hans Richter, who conducted it at the 1906 Birmingham Triennial Music Festival.

== List of works without opus number ==
=== Orchestra ===
- Suite in D major - Prelude & Bourrée (1891)
- Orchestral Suite (Suite d'Orchestre?) in four movements (1895)
- Overture, "Taming of the Shrew". (1898)
- Hercules March (1898)
- Incidental music for "Paolo and Francesca". (1902) (Note: Written for Stephen Phillips's tragedy after Dante. Includes No. 11 Marriage Song: Take the lilies for her hair (3 female voices); No. 19 Drinking song: Oh, I love not.)
- Incidental music to 'Flodden Field' (1902) (Note: Written for Herbert Tree's performances of Alfred Austin's play at His Majesty's Theatre)
- Incidental music to 'Richard II' (1903) (Note: Written for Herbert Tree's performances of Shakespeare's play at His Majesty's Theatre)
- Symphony (Sinfonietta) in G minor (1906) (Note: Written for Hans Richter and performed by him at the Birmingham Triennial Music Festival.)
- English Rhapsody (1910)
- Serenade for small orchestra (1911)
- Sakura suite No. 1 (1914)
- Sakura suite No. 2 (Suite de Ballet) (1915)
- Ballet Egyptien (1915)
- Suite pour petite orchestre (1915)
- Symphonic poem 'Anactoria', for viola and orchestra. (Note: A web search returns little information about this work, apart from its initial announcement in the Royal Philharmonic Society's 104th season beginning 1 Nov 1915 The Standard, 11 October 1915, p. 10)

=== Chamber works ===
- Piano Trio (1890)

=== Piano ===
- Tarantella in C, for piano. (1902)
- Improvisation, for piano. (pub. Ascherberg, 1919) (Note: "Percy Pitt's Improvisation, after beginning by calling to mind Raff's 'La Fileuse,' settles down into an extended and fluent arpeggid study." 'The Musical Times', Vol. 61, No. 923 (1 January 1920), pp. 45–47. Article Stable URL: https://www.jstor.org/stable/908488)
- Carnet de Voyage, pour piano. (1928)
  1. Prelude
  2. Souvenir
  3. Sérénade à la lune
  4. Berceuse
  5. Valse mignonne
- Five Dances - Suite in the old style, for piano, etc. (orch?) (1930)

=== Songs with orchestra ===
- Five Poems for baritone & orchestra (after Lenau, Cornelius, Dahn, Tasso, etc.? (1902) (Note: A review in The Atheneum magazine, 1902 read: "There is feeling and imagination in the music, and skill of a high order. To the orchestra is assigned, after the manner of Wagner, the most important part. The performance was not satisfactory. Mr. Davies's voice was not in the best condition; moreover, the orchestral playing was rough and too loud. Even had the rendering of them been faultless, so much thought is pressed into small space — all the five songs are brief — that they need more than one hearing. Of the poems by Lenau, Cornelius, Dahn, and Tasso there were English versions in the book from the clever pen of the vocalist.")
- Four Poems for mezzo-soprano & orchestra. (1904)
- 'Sérénade du passant' for soprano and orchestra, for Luisa Tetrazzini (1912)

=== Solo songs ===
- A Free Lance (pub. Leonard)
- Edenland (pub. Willcocks)
- Fedora - Gavotte
- For Memory's Sake (pub. Ascherberg)
- Her coming (pub. Ricordi)
- Let us forget (1928)
- Lines to his Ladye (after a 17th-century poem by H. Byatt). (1894)
- Love is a Dream (Alfred Austin). (pub. Elkin, 1903). (Note: Recorded by Louise Kirkby Lunn, 10” Red acoustic HMV DA568 [Bb3887-I/3893-I]: The Heart Worships (Holst)/Love is a Dream (Pitt).)
- Springtime (1928)
- Week before Easter (arr. Sussex folk song)
- When we two parted (pub. Ascherberg)
- Year after year (pub. Boosey)
- Yesterday and Today (Frances H. Burnett). Unpublished holograph MS dated 6 November 1892. (Note: Dedicated on the cover "à Madame Ysaÿe, souvenir d'un séjour à Bruxelles, September 1893". MS held at Yale Collection of American Literature, Beinecke Rare Book and Manuscript Library, Yale University. Worldcat.org Archivegrid)
- When I am dead, my dearest. (words, C. Rossetti) (pub. Gale, Weekes) (1896)

=== Chorus ===
- The Blessed Damozel, for chorus and orchestra.
- Schwerting the Saxon, for chorus and orchestra.
- Zephyr, stay thy vagrant flight. Glee for TTBB male voices (1894)

== List of works with opus number ==
Op. 1: Bagatelles, for Violin & Piano

1. Air de Ballet, 2. Lamento, 3. Romance, 4. Gavotte 5. Amoroso 6. Moto Perpetuo Souvenir.

Op. 2
Op. 3: Part Songs for ATBB Male Voices. (1895)

1. Sunset. 2. Serenade - While my Lady sleepeth. (Trans. J. G. Lockhart ) 3. A Cavalier's Song (G. J. Whyte-Melville)

Op. 4: Silhouettes (first set). Trois morceaux, for piano. (1895) Orch. by the composer (1907?)

1. 'Scene de Ballet' 2. Feuillet d'Album 3. Etude Mignonne

Op. 5: Hohenlinden, cantata for TTBB men's chorus and orchestra. (Words by Thomas Campbell.)(London: Novello, c1889)
Op. 6: Part songs for mixed choir:

1. A Song at Evening (S. K. Wiley), SATB. 2. Love is a Sickness full of Woes (Samuel Daniel), Madrigal in 6 parts, SSATBB. 3. The Stricken Hunter. Der traurige Jäger. A Lament. (Joseph von Eichendorff/engl. trans. C. Karlyle), SSATBB.

Op. 7
Op.8: Aquarelles, for violin & piano/orch?

1. Canzonetta. 2. Chant d'Automne. 3. Valse Oubliee.

Op. 9: Le Sang des Crépuscules: Prélude Symphonique d'après Charles Guérin. (Orch. 1900?)
Op. 10: The Sorrows of Werther. Humorous quartet for ATBB men's voices (W. M. Thackeray) (Note: In which Thackeray satirizes the plot of The Sorrows of Young Werther by Goethe).) (1901)
Op. 11: Miniatures. 3 Morceaux for piano. (London, Augener & Co., Sept 1894)

1. Gavotte et Musette. 2. Lointain passé. 3. Scherzino.

Op. 12
Op. 13
Op. 14: Pensées Fugitives, for piano.

1. En Valsant. 2. In Memoriam 3. Mélodie Intime

Op. 15
Op. 16: Impressions. Trois Morceaux pour piano. (1895)

1. Improvisation. 2. Veille de Départ. 3. Humoresque

Op. 17: Ballade for violin and orchestra (or violin & piano) (1900)
Op. 18: Three Romantic Pieces for cello & piano. (1896)

1. Petite Romance 2. Arioso 3. Feux follets

Op. 19
Op. 20: Modern Suite (Suite de Ballet) for orchestra. (1896) Also ?arr. piano as 4 Morceaux?

1. Prelude. 2. Minuetto. 3. Ballade. 4. Scherzo-Valse

Op. 21: Coronation March, for orchestra. Also arr. piano. (1896/7) (Note: Written for Queen Victoria's impending Diamond Jubilee.)
Op.22: Concertino in C minor for clarinet and orchestra. Also arr. clarinet & piano. (1897) (Note: Dedicated to Manuel Gomez (clarinettist), founder member of the London Symphony Orchestra. Source: Pitfield, Spenser S. (2000). British Music for Clarinet and Piano 1890-1945: Repertory and Performance Practice. Ph.D. Thesis, University of Sheffield. pp. 118, 125.)
Op. 23
Op. 24: Fêtes Galantes. Miniature Suite for Orchestra after Verlaine. (1896) Also arr. for piano duet, and for piano solo (at least Colombine) by the composer (1897)

1. Cortege 2. Marionettes 3. Sentimental interlude 4. Colombine (Valse) 5. Finale.

Op. 25
Op.26: Cinderella, a musical fairy tale for pianoforte duet. London, G. Ricordi & Co., 1899. Illustrated by Nelia Casella Also orchestrated by the composer. Illustrated piano duet score at imslp. Two extracts on YouTube. (Note: Two numbers for piano duet on YouTube: No. 2, Fairy Godmother No. 5, Prince Charming.)
Op. 27: Four Little Songs, for voice and piano.

1. Hildachen (E. Breck) 2. An Orchard Fancy. (K. Munkittrick) 3. The White Rose 4. Springtime (W.D. Howells)

Op. 28
Op. 29: Harmonies d'Autonne, for piano. (1899)

1. Promenade sentimentale. 2. Valse mélancolique. 3. Crépuscule

Op. 30: Part songs for miexed voices (1899/1900)

1. To Night. (John Malcolm) 2. Shepherds all and Maidens fair. (Edith Nesbit) 3. A Love Symphony. (Arthur O'Shaughnessy)

Op. 31
Op. 32 no. 2: Behold the Name of the Lord, Christmas anthem for SATB chorus. (Novello's Anthems, etc. No. 652) (1899)
Op. 32a: Oriental Rhapsody, for piano. (1903) Arranged for orchestra by the composer (1905).
Op. 33: Genre-Pictures, for piano. (1900)

1. Fughetta. 2. In an Album. 3. Serenatella. 4 Ländler. 5. Etüde-Nocturne.

Op. 33: Dance Rhythms, for orchestra. (1901) Also arr. for piano.

1. Espana. 2. Sarabanda. 3. Valse caprice

Op. 34: Trois Poésies, for voice and piano.

1. Je ne veux pas autre chose. 2. Parting. 3. Sérénade

Op. 35: Paolo & Francesca, Symphonic Impressions for orchestra, on the incidental music for Stephen Phillip's tragedy. (1902).
Op. 36: Part songs for mixed voices (1901?)

1. O Nightingale. (William Wordsworth), Five-part song. 2. ? 3. Laugh at Loving if You Will. (Francis Money-Coutts)

Op. 37: Silhouettes (second set), for piano. (London: Augener & Co., 1902)

1. Préambule. 2. Dirge. 3. Barcarolle 4. Intermezzo. 5. Caprice.

Op. 38
Op. 39: Five Sketches for piano. (1903)

1. Allegretto scherzando. 2. Alla Marcia. 3. Entr'acte. 4 Pizzicato. 5. Gavotte & Musette

Op. 39: Serenade, for small orchestra. (Note: '...the reviewer notes the "charming, daintily-scored Serenade for small orchestra by Mr. Percy Pitt" which received its first performance on October 18 and was repeated on October 20. The Musical Times, 1910, quoted at landofllostcontent.blogspot)
Op. 40: Three Old English Dances from the incidental music to King Richard II, for orchestra. (1904) Arr. for piano solo by the composer.

1. Country Dance. 2. Measure. 3. Morris Dance.

Op. 41: Three pieces for violin & piano. (Schott)

1. Air. 2. Fileuse. 3. Pensée d'Automne.

Op. 42
Op. 43
Op. 44: Three Songs, for voice and piano. (1914)

1. Let us forget. (M. Robinson.) 2. Winter. (Words by D. F. D.) 3. Thoughts at sunrise (George Meredith)

Op. 45: Four Pieces, for piano. (1907)

Book I: Prélude; Étude. Book II: Widmung; Fantasia Appassionata for 4 hands(?)

Op. 46
Op. 47
Op. 48: England’s Welcome. (1907)
Op. 49
Op. 50
Op. 51
Op. 52: Suite de ballet, for orchestra. (1901)

1. Saraband. 2. Valsette. 3. Gavotte 4.Musette.

Op. 53
Op. 54: Some Impressions and an Epilogue, for piano.

3. Aubade (Totland Bay). ?. Guitares et Mandolines.

== Piano scores and English versions of works by others ==
- Ludwig der Springer. Opera in three Acts, Op. 12. Libretto & music by Adolf Sandberger. Piano score by Percy Pitt and Wilhelm Ammermann.
- Gianni Schicchi (Puccini). Libretto by Giovacchino Forzano. English version by Percy Pitt. Vocal score (English and Italian) Milano : G. Ricordi e C. Edit. Tip., 1930
- The Vagabond and the Princess. Opera in one act by E. Poldini. Adapted from a fairy tale of Hans Christian Andersen by A.F. Seligmann; English version by Alfred Kalisch and Percy Pitt. (First performance, May 11, 1906)
