= Sidney Sutcliffe =

British oboist (1918–2001)

Sutcliffe, left with fellow oboist Terence MacDonagh centre and cor anglais player John Wolfe, c. 1969

Sidney Clement Sutcliffe (6 October 1918 – 1 July 2001) was a British oboist. He played in the London Philharmonic, Philharmonia and BBC Symphony orchestras, and was professor of oboe at the Royal College of Music in London.

== Life and career ==
Sutcliffe, known informally as "Jock", was born in Edinburgh on 6 October 1918, the son of the cellist Stanley Sutcliffe and his wife Elsie, née Hall, a pianist. He was educated at George Watson's College. He began his musical studies as a cellist, but joined the army in 1934 to earn a living as a bandsman and was assigned to the oboe. He won a Kneller Hall scholarship to the Royal College of Music (RCM) in London, where he studied for three years with Léon Goossens; he also studied the cello.

At the age of 17, while a student at the RCM, Sutcliffe made his professional debut, at the Wigmore Hall, London. In 1938 he was appointed principal oboe in the Sadler's Wells orchestra, but was recalled to the army on the outbreak of the Second World War the following year. He was due to be sent to Calais during the evacuation of Dunkirk, but was discovered to have astigmatism, and was kept on home duties. He was posted to Winchester to help to form a new band, and played the saxophone in a Dixieland group and a big band. The principal oboist of the London Philharmonic Orchestra (LPO), Michael Dobson, heard him playing and asked him to deputise for him for a recording session. This led to his replacing Dobson when the latter moved on in 1945.

At the LPO Sutcliffe spent what he called "four happy but strenuous years". The LPO, lacking public or private subsidy, had to be exceptionally hard-working. In a typical post-war season the orchestra gave more than twice as many concerts as the London Symphony Orchestra and seven times as many as the Philharmonia and Royal Philharmonic orchestras. In 1948 Sutcliffe married Thelma Roberts, one of the orchestra's secretaries.

In 1949 after turning him down once, Sutcliffe accepted Walter Legge's invitation to join the Philharmonia. The orchestra was gaining a reputation as the best in Britain except for its woodwind section, where Sir Thomas Beecham's celebrated "Royal Family" of wind players in the Royal Philharmonic was the most admired. Legge aimed to rival it with what he called his "royal flush", comprising Sutcliffe, Bernard Walton (clarinet), Gareth Morris (flute) and (from 1951) Cecil James (bassoon]. In 1964 Sutcliffe moved to the BBC Symphony Orchestra, where he remained for seven years.

Sutcliffe was a teacher at the RCM for 20 years and had ties with the National Youth Orchestra, the National Youth Orchestra of Wales and the Schools Music Association. He retired in 1983, but after his wife died, he accepted Yehudi Menuhin's invitation to return to his first instrument, the cello, and teach at the Menuhin School, which he did until his death. He died on 5 July 2001, aged 82.

== References and sources ==
=== Sources ===
- Gaster, Adrian (1980). International Who's Who in Music, and Musicians' Directory. Cambridge: International Who's Who in Music. OCLC 1035669453.
- Hill, Ralph, ed. (1951). Music 1951. Harmondsworth, England: Penguin Books. OCLC 26147349.
- Schwarzkopf, Elisabeth (1982). On and Off the Record: A Memoir of Walter Legge. London: Faber and Faber. ISBN 978-0-57-111928-8.
