= Gerald Jackson =

English flautist

Gerald Jackson (January 1900 – 1972 in Marylebone, London) was an English flautist particularly known as one of the four members of the Royal Philharmonic Orchestra's so-called "Royal Family" of woodwind players. He had earlier been principal flute of the London Philharmonic Orchestra and the BBC Symphony Orchestra.

== Life and career ==
Jackson was born in Leeds, the son of George William Jackson and his wife Mary, née Pratt. Jackson senior was a professional violinist, but he did not wish his son to become a professional player, and after leaving school Jackson worked in the offices of the Leeds city treasurer. After naval service in the First World War, he studied the flute with Albert Fransella, and supported himself by playing in a cinema orchestra.

In 1926 Jackson moved to London, where he played in cinemas and for the BBC Wireless Orchestra and later in theatre orchestras for productions by C B Cochran and Oswald Stoll. He began to secure ad hoc engagements with symphony orchestras, and in 1932 Sir Thomas Beecham appointed him principal flute of the new London Philharmonic Orchestra. After a year with Beecham, Jackson was offered better terms to move to the BBC Theatre Orchestra, where he played for four years, transferring to the BBC Symphony Orchestra in 1937.

In 1947 Beecham was assembling a new orchestra, the Royal Philharmonic (RPO). Jackson was its principal flute from its inception. He was soon joined in the woodwind section by Jack Brymer (clarinet), Gwydion Brooke (bassoon) and Terence MacDonagh (oboe). The Independent described them as "arguably the finest ever wind section ... [they] became known as 'The Royal Family'."

Jackson left the RPO in 1958 and freelanced for the rest of his career.
