= Roy Carter (oboist) =

Roy Carter is an English oboist, and musician.

== Early career ==
Carter began playing the oboe at the age of 10. He won scholarships to study with Margaret Eliot at the Royal Academy of Music (at 12) and later under Terence MacDonagh at the Royal College of Music (at 16), where he won the Joy Boughton Memorial Prize in only his second year of study.

== Musical career ==
His orchestral career began with the Philharmonia Orchestra as Co-Principal Oboe and then the English National Opera Orchestra as Principal Oboe. He joined the London Symphony Orchestra as Co-Principal Oboe in 1986 and was appointed to Principal Oboe in 1988, staying for almost twenty years before deciding to move to the Northern Sinfonia as Principal Oboe in late 2005. He moved to Trinidad and Tobago in 2009 as principal oboist, professor of oboe, and overseer of performance excellence at the University of Trinidad and Tobago and the related orchestra.

Roy featured in the performance of Beethoven's 9th Symphony featuring musicians from around the world, which took place under Leonard Bernstein on 25 December 1989, to commemorate the Berlin Wall. He and Bernstein maintained an amicable relationship until Bernstein's death in 1990. Roy was also a member of the Deutz Trio, alongside Paul Edmund-Davies (flute) and John Alley (piano), with whom he recorded four CDs. He performed both the Strauss (twice) and Mozart oboe concertos with the LSO, along with the Takemitsu concerto for Oboe d'amore and guitar with Julien Bream and the LSO. Carter performed chamber music with the Northern Sinfonia during his four-year stay with them. He also went on a concerto tour with the Queensland Philharmonic, and world premièred and recorded the Dominic Muldowney oboe concerto, which was commissioned for him, in 1994. It was released on CD the same year by NMC and was re-released with other classical recordings in 1997 in "NMC Selection 1" The recording of this concerto has recently been re-released.

== Education career ==
Carter taught at the Guildhall School of Music between 1990 and 1995, and has also taught and coached at the Royal Academy of Music and the Royal College of Music, where he was recorded for the televised 'Great Musicians of the World' series. He has also given master-classes in Italy and coached the National Youth Orchestra of Great Britain, and was on the panel for the LSO Shell Scholarship for eighteen years. He is currently Professor of Oboe in the Talent Music Master Courses programme in Brescia, Italy.

== In popular music and film ==
Carter has also played the music to numerous popular recordings and films, Including Star Wars Episodes I, II, III, and V, Harry Potter & The Chamber of Secrets, Braveheart, Nanny McPhee, and Michael Flatley's Lord of the Dance.

He plays a Howarth XL Oboe.
