= Gwydion Brooke =

English bassoonist (1912 - 2005)

Gwydion Brooke (16 February 1912 – 27 March 2005) was the principal bassoonist of the Royal Philharmonic Orchestra and a member of its "Royal Family" of wind instrumentalists, along with Jack Brymer (clarinet), Terence MacDonagh (oboe), and Gerald Jackson (flute).

Born Frederick James Gwydion Holbrooke, he was the son of the composer Joseph Holbrooke.

After the death of Sir Thomas Beecham in 1961, Walter Legge hired Brooke as the principal bassoonist of the Philharmonia Orchestra, where he remained until his retirement in 1979. His recordings include one of the Mozart bassoon concerto with Beecham and the Royal Philharmonic Orchestra, and the Weber bassoon concerto with Malcolm Sargent and the Royal Liverpool Philharmonic Orchestra. According to Christopher Palmer, the clarinettist Thea King described Brooke as "the finest bassoonist she's ever known, an artist of the first rank". Composer Elizabeth Maconchy dedicated her Concertino for Bassoon & String Orchestra (1950) to Brooke, who gave the premiere performance at The Proms on 30 July 1954, again under the baton of Sargent.
