= Cecil James =

Cecil Edwin James (10 April 1913 – 13 January 1999) was a prominent English bassoonist born in London to a musical family. His father Wilfred (1878–1941) was a bassoonist in the Queen's Hall Orchestra and professor at the Royal College of Music. His uncle Edwin (1861–1921), also a fine bassoonist, was a founding member of the London Symphony Orchestra in 1904. His uncle Frank was second trumpet with the BBC Symphony Orchestra.

Cecil studied with his father, won a scholarship to the Royal College of Music. There, in 1933, he performed the Mozart Concerto with Orchestra and shortly after was appointed to the London Symphony Orchestra. It was there he met oboist Natalie Caine whom he married in 1938. During the war, he played with the Royal Air Force Central Band alongside Gareth Morris, Leonard Brain, Dennis Brain, Norman Del Mar, Harry Blech, Fred Grinke, Leonard Hirsch, Jim Merrett and James Whitehead.

When demobbed, he joined the New Symphony, then in 1951 was appointed by Walter Legge as principal bassoonist with the Philharmonia Orchestra, playing under such conductors as Guido Cantelli, Wilhelm Furtwängler, Herbert von Karajan, Otto Klemperer and Arturo Toscanini.

He also in demand for inclusion in chamber groups such as Karl Haas's London Baroque Ensemble and the Dennis Brain Quintet, usually with musicians he admired, such as his wife Natalie, Dennis Brain, Wilfred Parry and, especially, fellow bassoonist Paul Draper.

Cecil's instrument, a Buffet-Crampon bassoon which had been presented to his father by the makers, was made to the French "Buffet" pattern – quite distinct from those of the more modern German "Heckel" system, which he derided as "mumblephones", but which were clearly taking over as instruments of choice. He always made his own reeds.

He never held a formal teaching position and only rarely took pupils; his irascible temper was legendary, though he mellowed a little with age and the desire to promote use of antique instruments.

== Sources ==
- Obituary William Waterhouse for The Independent
- Biography Gareth Morris for The Double Reed
- Obituary William Waterhouse for The Double Reed
