= Natalie Caine =

British musician (1909–2008)

Natalie Caine (6 June 1909 – 28 December 2008) was one of the first female woodwind players to establish themselves in leading British orchestras. She is frequently referred to by her married name Natalie James.

== Early life and education ==
She was born Evelyn Natalie Caine in Hoylake in Cheshire and was educated at St Felix School, in Southwold, Suffolk. She enrolled in the Royal College of Music in 1928, initially to study piano and composition, but was captivated by the oboe playing of Sylvia Spencer, a student of Léon Goossens, who promptly took her on as a student. In 1931 she won a scholarship and was soon playing solo part in Mozart's Sinfonia Concertante, conducted by Adrian Boult. Another soloist on that stage was her future husband, the bassoonist Cecil James.

== Life and work ==
Other fellow students who were to make a name for themselves were Benjamin Britten, Joy Boughton, Sidney Sutcliffe, Marjorie Trevelyan, Margaret Eliot and Evelyn Rothwell. It was to avoid confusion of names with Evelyn Rothwell (who was to become Lady Barbirolli) that she dropped her own first name.

In 1934 she and Evelyn Rothwell were engaged to play for Fritz Busch at the Glyndebourne Festival. Engagements for the two with the London Symphony Orchestra followed soon after.

In 1936 Benjamin Britten dedicated his newly composed Temporal Suite to Natalie. It received mixed reviews however, and Britten withdrew the composition. When it was eventually published (as Temporal Variations) after his death, its dedication was no longer to Natalie, a cut that hurt her deeply.

== Personal life ==
She married Cecil James in 1938. He was to spend the war as bassoonist with the Royal Air Force Central Band, so enjoyed a social life not enjoyed by many.

She combined bringing up their three daughters with a freelance musical career, working with Philharmonia Orchestra, the London Mozart Players and the London Baroque Ensemble, with all of whom her husband was also associated.

She enjoyed working with young people, working as diploma examiner and was for many years associated with the junior orchestra. She was professor of oboe at the Royal College of Music from 1964 to 1979.

== Sources ==
- Obituary in The Guardian by Sarah Francis
