= Emilia Hoving =

Finnish conductor (born 1994)

Emilia Hoving (born November 1994 in Helsinki) is a Finnish conductor.

== Life ==
The Finnish-Swedish conductor Emilia Hoving began piano lessons at the age of 6 and also learned clarinet and cello. She studied music education at the Sibelius Academy before turning to conducting in 2015. She studied with Jorma Panula, Atso Almila, Sakari Oramo, and Hannu Lintu at the Panula and Sibelius Academies, among others.

Hoving is one of the main characters in the documentary film Conductivity (Finnish title Orkesterin Edessä) about the conducting students of the Sibelius Academy.

During her time as assistant conductor with the Finnish Radio Symphony Orchestra under chief conductor Hannu Lintu, she attracted international attention in May 2019 when she stepped in live on television to conduct the Orchestre Philharmonique de Radio France in a concert featuring works by Anton Bruckner and Bernd Alois Zimmermann.

Since January 2020, Hoving has been assistant conductor of the Orchestre Philharmonique de Radio France under its chief conductor Mikko Franck.

She has appeared as a guest soloist with almost all Finnish orchestras, including the Sinfonia Lahti, the Tapiola Sinfonietta, and the Tampere Philharmonic Orchestra. In 2021, she made her debuts with the Helsinki Philharmonic Orchestra and the Royal Stockholm Philharmonic Orchestra. In 2021/22, she debuted with, among others, the Orchestre national de Lille, the Luxembourg Philharmonic Orchestra, the Iceland Symphony Orchestra, and the Orchestre Symphonique de Québec.

In 2023, she conducted the Kiel Philharmonic Orchestra at the 4th Philharmonic Concert featuring music from Finland (works by Kaija Saariaho, Magnus Lindberg, Einojuhani Rautavaara, and Jean Sibelius).

As of 2026, she holds the post of Associate Conductor with the Royal Philharmonic Orchestra.

== Prizes and awards ==
- 2021: Critics' Spurs Prize of the Finnish Critics Association.
