= Terence MacDonagh =

English oboist (1908 - 1986)

MacDonagh, centre, with fellow oboist Sidney Sutcliffe (l) and cor anglais player John Wolfe, circa 1969

John Alfred Terence MacDonagh OBE (3 February 1908 – 12 September 1986) was an English oboist and cor anglais player, particularly known as one of the four members of the Royal Philharmonic Orchestra's so-called "Royal Family" of woodwind players.

== Life and career ==
MacDonagh was born in Woolwich, London, the son of the oboist and cor anglais player James MacDonagh. He studied in Paris with Myrtile Morel, and in London with Léon Goossens. In 1926 he joined the Scottish Orchestra, and quickly moved to the British National Opera Company, with which he played from 1926 to 1929. When Adrian Boult was assembling the BBC Symphony Orchestra in 1930, MacDonagh was recruited as its cor anglais player. In 1937 he was promoted to principal oboist. He also played the oboe d'amore when needed, though he was not enamoured of the instrument: "You don't want to play that bloody thing. It's always out of tune, has a mind of its own and no bloody répertoire."

During the Second World War MacDonagh served in the armed forces. He returned to the BBC in 1945. When Sir Thomas Beecham founded the Royal Philharmonic Orchestra (RPO) in 1946 his first principal oboe was Peter Newbury, formerly of the London Philharmonic. Newbury left the following year and joined the Philharmonia Orchestra; Beecham invited MacDonagh to replace him. The RPO became celebrated for its team of woodwind principals, in which MacDonagh was joined by Jack Brymer (clarinet), Gwydion Brooke (bassoon) and Gerald Jackson (flute). The Independent described them as "arguably the finest ever wind section ... [they] became known as 'The Royal Family'."

After Beecham's death in 1961, MacDonagh, Brymer and others became unhappy with the management of the RPO, and they moved – in MacDonagh's case moved back – to the BBC Symphony Orchestra. This was MacDonagh's last orchestral position. He retired in 1973.

From 1945 to 1978 MacDonagh was professor of oboe at the Royal College of Music; his students included Neil Black, Anthony Camden, Roy Carter, Sarah Francis, Edwin Roxburgh and John Warrack. He is credited by the oboist Geoffrey Burgess with introducing a lasting French influence into English oboe playing.

MacDonagh was appointed OBE in 1979. He died in London on 12 September 1986, aged 78.

== Notes ==
Photo by Geoffrey Browne
