= Percy Pitt =

English organist, conductor and composer (1869 - 1932)

- Born: 4 January 1869
- Origin: London, England
- Died: 23 November 1932 (aged 63) London, England
- Genre: Classical
- Occupations: Organist, conductor, composer
- Instrument: Organ
- Years active: 1893–1930

Percy Pitt (4 January 1869 – 23 November 1932) was an English organist, conductor, composer, and director of music of the BBC from 1924 to 1930.

== Biography ==
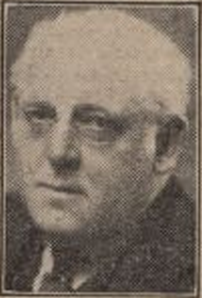
Pitt during his British National Opera Company period

A native of London, Pitt studied music in Europe at the Leipzig conservatory with Carl Reinecke and Salomon Jadassohn, then at the Royal Academy of Music in Munich with Josef Rheinberger, and for six months in Berlin.

Returning home in 1893, he became associated with the Queen's Hall which Robert Newman (an old family friend) had helped to build in 1893 and put on the first series of Promenade Concerts there in 1895. Pitt took over as accompanist at Queen's Hall in 1896 and accompanied the sung solo items at the first of Henry Wood's Prom concerts in August 1897.

He was appointed by Henry ('Harry') Higgins in late 1902 as music advisor at the Royal Opera House, Covent Garden (where André Messager was musical director), also acting as musical coach and assistant stage conductor. He was assistant to Hans Richter in 1903, preparing the chorus and orchestra for a complete 'Ring' cycle (given twice) under Richter's baton. (Note: The performances were "busting," according to Pitt in a letter to Elgar, "but I need not tell you how great Richter was..." (Chamier 1938, p. 105).) (Note: The very first complete 'Ring' in England was conducted by Anton Seidl at Her Majesty's Theatre, 5–9 May 1882 ("Wagner's music in England". Musical Times, Vol. 47, No. 763, 1 September 1906, p. 593), and Gustav Mahler gave the first at Covent Garden in 1896: (Parker 1900, p. 39). Richter had given the very first complete Ring at the Bayreuth Festival in 1876.) Richter conducted the Ring (in German) at Covent Garden in 1905, '06 and '07. Pitt became director of music at Covent Garden in 1907 after Messager's departure. In 1908, he was again Richter's assistant in a highly regarded production of Wagner's Ring of the Nibelung sung in English. His association with Richter gives special interest to his recordings of extracts from the Ring (1908 and 1921-2: all made for His Master's Voice). He remained with the company until 1915, when he joined the Beecham Opera Company as conductor. There he remained until 1920, when he became director of the British National Opera Company; he stayed with that company until 1924, when he was again associated with the Beecham Opera company.

From May 1923 he was musical director of the British Broadcasting Company (succeeding L. Stanton Jefferies, who remained with the company in another role), becoming full-time director of music in November 1924, remaining there through its 1927 transition from the commercial to public sector, as the British Broadcasting Corporation, and until he was succeeded by Adrian Boult in 1930. Pitt died in London in 1932.

== Conducting skills ==
"His conducting methods were a trifle peculiar. He had a habit of burying his head in the score and waving his arms over his head like a gesticulating stag-beetle... This habit rather detracted from the personal magnetism which great conductors exercise, owing to the orphaned orchestra seeing nothing less abstract than a baton."

== Composer ==
Pitt's reputation as a composer, strong in his early career, has been completely eclipsed, with no sign of any modern revival in interest. Henry Wood gave the first performances of most of his major works after 1896, starting with the Coronation March and the miniature suite Fêtes galantes that year. Pitt wrote a Clarinet Concerto for Manuel Gomez in 1897 and a Ballade for violin and orchestra for Eugène Ysaÿe in 1900. Pieces heard more than once at The Proms included the Air de Ballet, Op. 1 for violin and piano (1899 and 27 performance up until 1925), and the orchestral works Dance Rhythms (1901 and 1903), Oriental Rhapsody (1902, 1905, 1918, 1920) and An English Rhapsody (1911 and 1929).

His G minor Sinfonietta (or Symphony) was written at the request of Hans Richter, who conducted it at the 1906 Birmingham Triennial Music Festival. Pitt also wrote stage music, including the incidental music to Stephen Phillips's play Paolo and Francesca (1902). There are many piano pieces and songs. One of his biggest successes as a composer came with the song Sérénade du passant (1913), performed by Luisa Tetrazzini at her first Queen's Hall appearance in 1917.
