= Alfonso Marconi =

Alfonso Marconi (1865–1936) was an Italian businessman and collector of stringed instruments, most famous for assisting his younger brother Guglielmo Marconi in his pioneering work on long-distance radio transmission.

== Biography ==
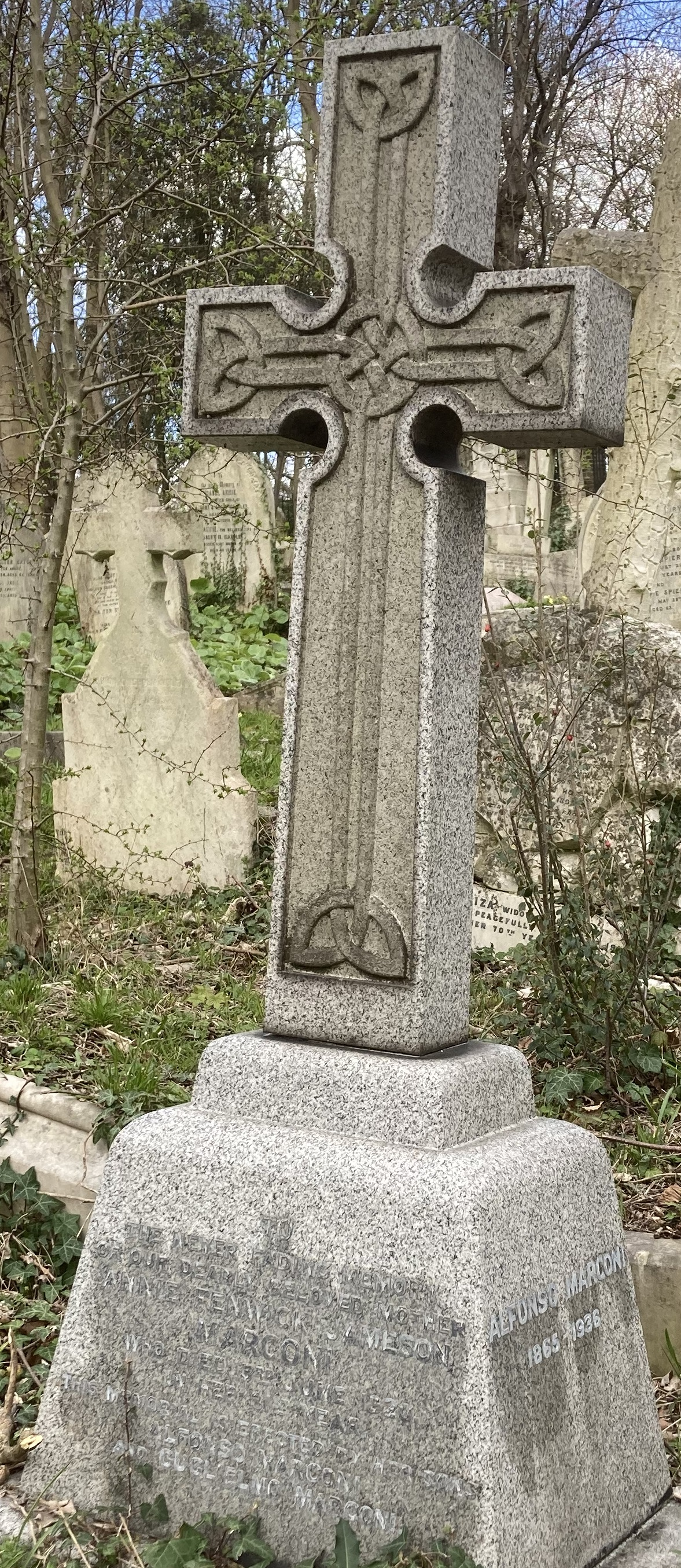
Grave of Alfonso Marconi in Highgate Cemetery

=== Early life and education ===
Alfonso Marconi was born into the Italian nobility in 1865, the first son of Giuseppe Marconi (an Italian aristocratic landowner from Porretta Terme) and of his Irish/Scots wife, Annie Jameson (daughter of Andrew Jameson of Daphne Castle in County Wexford, Ireland, and granddaughter of John Jameson, founder of whiskey distillers Jameson & Sons). Alfonso was educated at Bedford School in England and in Livorno and Florence at technical colleges.

=== Assistant to Guglielmo Marconi ===
Alfonso Marconi assisted his younger brother Guglielmo Marconi with his early experiments, and in the summer of 1895 Guglielmo moved his experimentation outdoors. After increasing the length of transmitter and receiver antennas, arranging them vertically, and positioning an antenna so that it touched the ground, Guglielmo significantly increased the range he could achieve.

Alfonso stood on one side of a hill near to the family home of Villa Griffone in Pontecchio, Italy, and fired a shot which was transmitted over the hill to Guglielmo: a distance of approximately 2.4 kilometres (1.5 mi). Guglielmo concluded that, with additional funding and research, a device could become capable of spanning greater distances and would prove valuable both commercially and militarily.

=== Later life ===
Alfonso Marconi was a director of the American International Marine Communication Company and a collector of stringed instruments.

He died suddenly at a London hotel on the evening of Friday 24 April 1936 following a heart attack (his brother died following a heart attack in 1937) and is buried with his mother on the eastern side of Highgate Cemetery.
