= Royal Philharmonic Orchestra =

British symphony orchestra

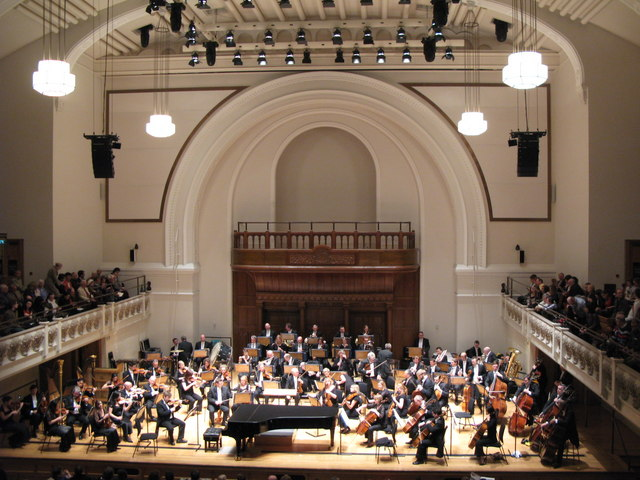
- The RPO at Cadogan Hall, its home since 2004
- Short name: RPO
- Founded: 1946; 80 years ago
- Location: London, England, UK
- Concert hall: Cadogan Hall; Royal Albert Hall
- Website: www.rpo.co.uk

The Royal Philharmonic Orchestra (RPO) is a symphony orchestra based in London, England. It was established by Thomas Beecham in 1946. In its early days, the orchestra secured profitable recording contracts and important engagements including the Glyndebourne Festival Opera and the concerts of the Royal Philharmonic Society. After Beecham's death in 1961, the RPO's fortunes declined steeply. The RPO battled for survival until the mid-1960s, when its future was secured after a report by the Arts Council of Great Britain recommended that it should receive public subsidy. A further crisis arose in the same era when it seemed that the orchestra's right to call itself "Royal" could be withdrawn.

In 2004, the RPO acquired its first permanent London base, at Cadogan Hall in Chelsea. The RPO also gives concerts at the Royal Festival Hall, the Royal Albert Hall and venues around the United Kingdom and other countries. Since the start of the 2021–2022 season, the orchestra's musical director has been Vasily Petrenko.

== History ==
=== Origins ===
Arms of the Royal Philharmonic Orchestra

In 1932, Sir Thomas Beecham had founded the London Philharmonic Orchestra (LPO), which, with the backing of rich supporters, he ran until 1940, when finances dried up in wartime. Beecham left to conduct in Australia and then the US; the orchestra continued without him after reorganising itself as a self-governing body. On Beecham's return to England in September 1944 the LPO welcomed him back and, in October, they gave a concert together that drew superlatives from the critics. Over the next months, Beecham and the orchestra gave further concerts with considerable success, but the LPO players, now their own employers, declined to give him the unfettered control he had exercised in the 1930s. If he were to become chief conductor again, it would be as a paid employee of the orchestra. Beecham responded, "I emphatically refuse to be wagged by any orchestra ... I am going to found one more great orchestra to round off my career." In 1945 he conducted the first concert of Walter Legge's new Philharmonia Orchestra, but was not disposed to accept a salaried position from Legge, his former assistant, any more than from his former players in the LPO. (Note: Of the 75 players who constituted the LPO in 1944 only 18 had been in the LPO that Beecham left in 1940.) His new orchestra to rival the Philharmonia would, he told Legge, be launched in "the most auspicious circumstances and éclat".

In 1946, Beecham reached an agreement with the Royal Philharmonic Society: his orchestra would replace the LPO at all the Society's concerts. He thus gained the right to name the new ensemble the "Royal Philharmonic Orchestra", an arrangement approved by George VI. (Note: The Society had its own orchestra from its foundation in 1813 until 1932, when it agreed with Beecham that the new LPO would play at all its concerts. The new Royal Philharmonic Orchestra was granted the right to use the name when playing for the Society or at any other performance conducted by or under the artistic control of Beecham.) Beecham arranged with the Glyndebourne Festival that the RPO should be the resident orchestra at Glyndebourne seasons. He secured backing, including that of record companies in the US as well as Britain, with whom lucrative recording contracts were negotiated. The music critic Lyndon Jenkins writes:

Naturally, it quickly became known that he was planning another orchestra, at which the cry "He'll never get the players!" went up just as it had done in 1932. Beecham was unmoved: "I always get the players," he retorted. "Among other considerations, they are so good they refuse to play under anybody but me".

=== Beecham's orchestra ===
Beecham appointed Victor Olof as his orchestral manager, and they started recruiting. At the top of their list were leading musicians with whom Beecham had worked before the war. Four had been founder members of the LPO fifteen years previously: Reginald Kell (clarinet), Gerald Jackson (flute), James Bradshaw (timpani) and Jack Silvester (double-bass). From the current LPO they engaged the oboist Peter Newbury. Beecham persuaded the veteran bassoonist Archie Camden, who had been pursuing a solo career, to return to orchestral work. The cellos were led by Raymond Clark, enlisted from the BBC Symphony Orchestra. The principal horn player was Dennis Brain, who already held the same post in Legge's Philharmonia, but managed to play for both orchestras. Jenkins speculates that as Beecham knew all Britain's orchestral leaders at first hand he decided not to try to lure any of them away. His choice was John Pennington, who had been first violin of the London String Quartet from 1927 to 1934, and had then had a career in the US as concertmaster, successively, of the San Francisco Symphony, Los Angeles Philharmonic and Paramount Pictures orchestras.

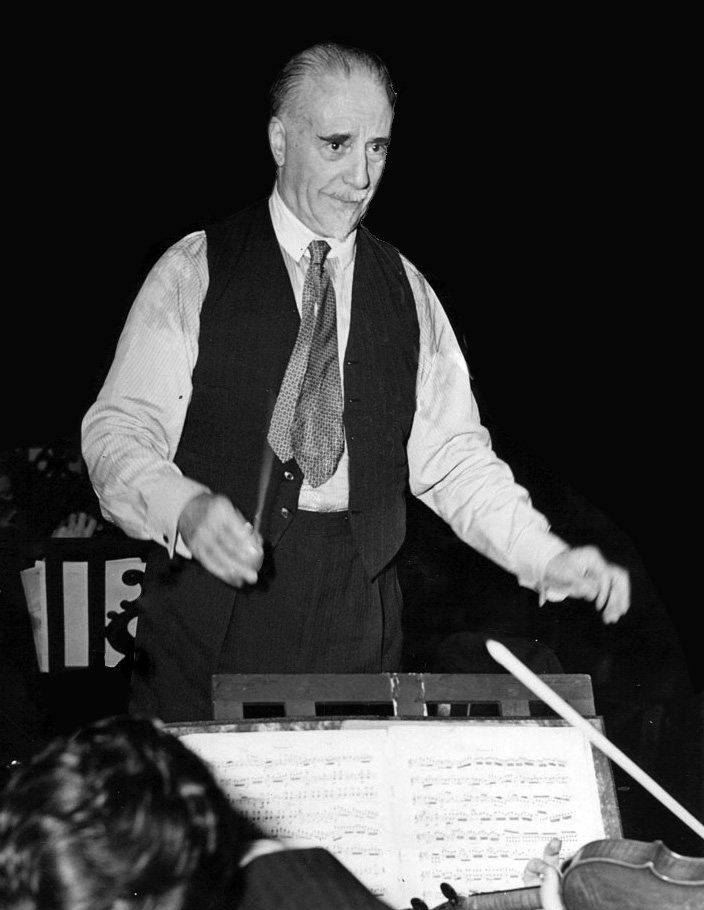
Beecham rehearsing in 1948

On 11 September 1946, the Royal Philharmonic assembled for its first rehearsal. Four days later it gave its first concert, at the Davis Theatre, Croydon. Beecham telegraphed a colleague, "Press virtually unanimous in praise of orchestra. First Croydon concert huge success". Beecham and the orchestra played a series of out-of-town engagements before venturing a first London concert on 26 October. The Times then spoke of "a hall filled with golden tone which enveloped the listener". Before its London debut the orchestra made its first recording and, within two years, had made more than 100.

Within a few months, Pennington was forced to resign when the British Musicians' Union discovered that he was not one of its members. (Note: At the time, union membership was compulsory for players in British orchestras.) He was succeeded by his deputy Oscar Lampe, "a man who eschewed most social graces but played the violin divinely", according to Jenkins. In the early days, the orchestra comprised 72 players, all on yearly contract to Beecham, giving him first call on their services, subject to reasonable notice, but not otherwise restricting their freedom to play for other ensembles. A review of the London orchestral scene of the late 1940s said of the RPO and its main rival: "The Philharmonia and Royal Philharmonic share a very serious disability: that neither is a permanently constituted orchestra. Both assemble and disperse more or less at random ... there is no style which is distinctively RPO or Philharmonia."

Brain continued to play first horn for both orchestras; otherwise, from the early 1950s, there was generally more stability of orchestral personnel. In particular, the RPO became celebrated for its regular team of woodwind principals, in which Jackson was joined by Jack Brymer (clarinet), Gwydion Brooke (bassoon) and Terence MacDonagh (oboe). The Independent described them as "arguably the finest ever wind section ... [they] became known as 'The Royal Family'." (Note: Jackson left the orchestra in 1958 and was succeeded by Geoffrey Gilbert, whom The Times called "the most influential British flautist of the twentieth century". The quartet of woodwind soloists continued to be generally known as "the Royal Family")

The RPO toured the United States in 1950, the first British orchestra to visit America since the London Symphony Orchestra (LSO) in 1912. This was a long-cherished plan of Beecham's, who had been unable to take the LPO to the US in the 1930s. He arranged 52 concerts in 45 cities in 64 days. The tour was described by Brain's biographers Gamble and Lynch as a huge success. It began on 13 October in Hartford, Connecticut and finished on 15 December in Bethlehem, Pennsylvania. The concerto soloists were the pianist Betty Humby Beecham (the conductor's second wife) and orchestral principals: David McCallum (violin), Anthony Pini (cello) and the four members of the "Royal Family". In The New York Times, Olin Downes wrote of "magnificent music-making by Sir Thomas Beecham and the Royal Philharmonic". The following year, assessing all the London orchestras, Frank Howes, music critic of The Times, concluded that the RPO "comes nearest in quality and in consistency of style to the great international orchestras".

The orchestra's first appearance at the Proms took place in August 1952, conducted by Basil Cameron. Beecham made his Proms debut two years later, conducting the RPO in a programme of music by Berlioz, Schubert and Sibelius; The Times commented on "an evening of magnificent playing". In 1957, Beecham and the RPO made a European tour, beginning at the Salle Pleyel in Paris and ending at the Musikverein in Vienna.

Beecham conducted the RPO in his last concert, given at Portsmouth Guildhall on 7 May 1960. The programme, all characteristic choices, comprised the Magic Flute Overture, Haydn's Military Symphony, Beecham's own Handel arrangement Love in Bath, Schubert's Fifth Symphony, On the River by Delius, and the Bacchanale from Saint-Saëns's Samson and Delilah, with Delius's Sleigh Ride as an encore. Beecham suffered a heart attack the following month, from which he did not recover; he died in March 1961.

=== 1961–2000 ===
Gentlemen, there are four other orchestras in London; you can always go and work for them.

— Lady Beecham to RPO members, 1963

Rudolf Kempe, who had been appointed associate conductor in 1960, became principal conductor in 1961 and music director in 1962. Beecham's widow (Note: Shirley, née Hudson, Beecham's third wife and former secretary, whom he married in 1959, a year after Betty Humby Beecham died.) ran the affairs of the orchestra as best she could, but some senior players including Brymer and MacDonagh were unhappy with the management and they left. The orchestra reorganised itself in 1963 as a self-governing limited company, but almost immediately encountered difficulties. The Royal Philharmonic Society decided not to engage the RPO for its concerts; Glyndebourne booked the LPO instead of the RPO from 1964 onwards. The RPO was also excluded from the London Orchestral Concert Board's schedule of concerts, which meant that it was denied the use of London's main concert venue, the Royal Festival Hall. Kempe resigned, although he returned shortly afterwards. Helped by strong support from Sir Malcolm Sargent, the orchestra successfully mounted its own concerts at a cinema in Swiss Cottage, 3.5 miles (5.6 km) to the north-west of the Festival Hall. A 1965 report to the Arts Council by a committee chaired by Alan Peacock recommended that all four independent London orchestras should receive adequate public subsidy.

The severance of the tie with the Royal Philharmonic Society in 1963 turned out to be temporary, (Note: The RPS resumed its association with the orchestra from the 1966–67 season.) but for three years it threatened to deprive the RPO of the "Royal" in its title. The matter was resolved in 1966, when, on the advice of Roy Jenkins who, as Home Secretary, had responsibility for such matters, the Queen conferred the title unconditionally on the orchestra.

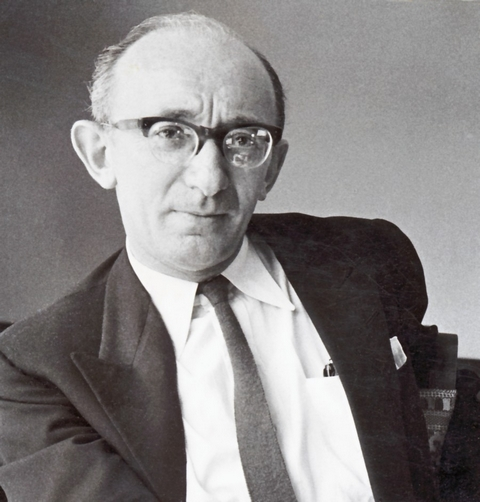
Clifford Curzon, soloist at the RPO's Silver Jubilee concert

The RPO celebrated its silver jubilee in 1971. On 15 September, the orchestra returned to Croydon, where it had made its debut 25 years earlier. The theatre in which it had first played had been demolished and the anniversary concert was therefore given at the Fairfield Halls. The programme consisted of the overture to The Marriage of Figaro, Beethoven's Emperor Concerto, and Holst's The Planets. Sir Adrian Boult conducted, and Clifford Curzon was the soloist. Five members of the original orchestra were still in the RPO for the jubilee concert: Leonard Brain (brother of Dennis), principal cor anglais; Lewis Pocock, co-principal timpani; Ernest Ineson, double bass; John Myers, viola; and Albert Pievsky, violin.

The RPO gave Kempe the title of "Conductor for Life" in 1970. Kempe stepped down from the orchestra in 1975, the year before his death. Antal Doráti succeeded Kempe as chief conductor from 1975 to 1978. As in his earlier spells with the LSO and BBC Symphony Orchestra, he was not greatly liked by his players, but raised their standard of playing and imposed discipline.

In 1984, a new threat to the orchestra emerged, where a review carried out on behalf of the Arts Council by the journalist William Rees-Mogg opined that England lacked "a great eastern symphony orchestra": the suggestion was that the RPO should move to Nottingham. Another Arts Council report of the same period recommended that the RPO should supplement the LSO as resident orchestra at the Barbican Centre; neither proposal came to fruition. During the 1980s, the British government imposed strict constraints on public spending; to make up for lost revenue, the RPO, in common with the other self-governing London orchestras, was forced into increased reliance on business sponsorship as a primary source of funds. The Grove Dictionary of Music and Musicians, recording this, comments, "Such sponsorship is, however, subject to changing circumstances and thus less secure in the long term."

Since 1993, the RPO has had a community and education programme, later given the title of "RPO Resound". It aims to increase "access to and engagement with world-class music-making." It has worked in venues including homeless shelters, hospices, youth clubs and prisons.

On 7 April 1994, the RPO, with guest leader Hugh Bean, was joined by the Cappella Giulia of Saint Peter's Basilica and the Accademia Filarmonica Romana, cellist Lynn Harrell and actor Richard Dreyfuss, in the Papal Concert to Commemorate the Shoah, conducted by Gilbert Levine. This concert was attended by Pope John Paul II, Chief Rabbi of Rome Elio Toaff, and President of Italy Oscar Luigi Scalfaro, and was broadcast throughout Europe via Eurovision and on PBS stations throughout the United States. It was released on CD by Justice Records and as video by Time-Warner.

=== 21st century ===
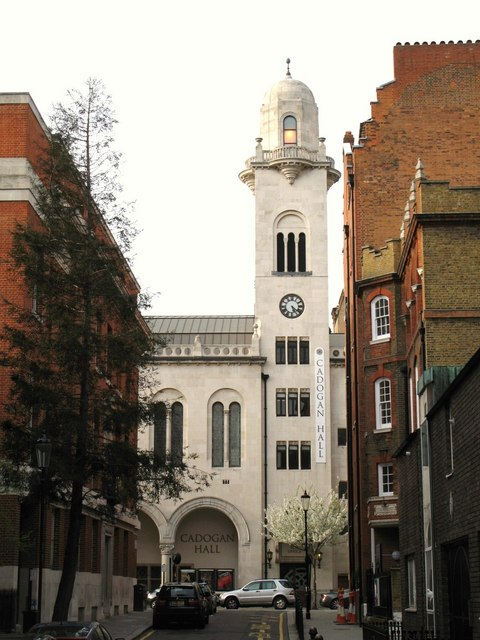
Cadogan Hall, the RPO's home since 2004

The orchestra gives an annual series of concerts at the Festival Hall and, since 2004, has had a permanent home at Cadogan Hall, a former church in Chelsea, converted into a 900-seat concert hall and rehearsal space. At the Royal Albert Hall in London, the RPO gives performances ranging from large-scale choral and orchestral works to evenings of popular classics.

The RPO returned to international television on 29 July 2005, when it was joined by the London Philharmonic Choir and soloists Bozena Harasimowicz, Monica Groop, Jerry Hadley, and Franz-Josef Selig performing Beethoven's Missa Solemnis under the baton of Gilbert Levine in Cologne Cathedral. This performance was televised by Westdeutscher Rundfunk (WDR), 3sat and PBS and was released on DVD by Arthaus Musik.

The orchestra maintains a regional touring programme, taking in venues throughout the UK, and has established residencies in Aylesbury, Crawley, Croydon, Dartford, High Wycombe, Ipswich, Lowestoft, Northampton and Reading. (Note: The number of towns and cities in which the RPO regularly plays is reflected in the sobriquet adopted in some of the orchestra's marketing: "The Nation's Favourite Orchestra".) The RPO regularly tours overseas; since 2010 it has played in Azerbaijan, Canada, China, Germany, Italy, Japan, Russia, Spain, Turkey and the US. In 2010–11 and two subsequent seasons the RPO was the resident orchestra for a series of concerts in Montreux, Switzerland. In 2010 the orchestra toured England, with a repertoire preponderantly of Beethoven, including the Violin Concerto in which Pinchas Zukerman was both soloist and conductor. In the same year, another tour featured Maxim Shostakovich conducting the music of his father, Dmitri Shostakovich. The RPO continues to feature at the Proms. In December 2015, RPO gave a concert with Sezen Aksu at Zorlu PSM. In November 2019, the Royal Albert Hall announced the RPO as its official associate orchestra, with an initial contract of 5 years.

The orchestra's community and education activities have continued into the 21st century. In May 2013, six youth ensembles from London boroughs and a 3,500-strong choir of children from local primary schools were given the chance to perform alongside members of the RPO at the Albert Hall. They played a piece composed by participants from all six musical ensembles.

In November 2022, three performances by the orchestra were released on streaming service On Air. Recorded at BBC Television Centre, performances of The Rite Of Spring, The Firebird and Petrushka by Igor Stravinsky were captured. In 2023, RPO musicians were selected to play at the coronation of Charles III and Camilla.

In March 2024, the RPO announced the appointment of Sarah Bardwell as its next managing director, in succession to James Williams.

As of 2026, the RPO's Associate Conductor is Emilia Hoving, a graduate of the Sibelius Academy.

== Players and conductors ==
Among the well-known musicians who have been RPO principals in the mid-1950s and later, string players include Steven Staryk (leader, 1957–1959), Raymond Cohen (leader, 1959–1966), Alan Loveday (leader, 1967–1971), Erich Gruenberg (leader, 1972–1976), Barry Griffiths (leader, 1976–1989), Jonathan Carney (leader, 1991–1994), Clio Gould (leader, 2002-2016) and Frederick Riddle (viola, 1953–1977). Among the woodwind principals have been Geoffrey Gilbert (flute, 1957–1961), James Galway (flute, 1967–1969), Antony Pay (clarinet, 1968–1978) and Michael Chapman (bassoon, 1978–1999). Principals in the brass section have included Alan Civil (horn, 1952–1955), Philip Jones (trumpet, 1956–1960), Elgar Howarth (trumpet, 1963–1969) and Martin Owen (horn, 1998–2008).

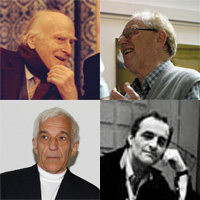
Clockwise from top left: Menuhin, Mackerras, Dutoit and Ashkenazy

Chief conductors since Dorati have been Walter Weller (1980–1985), André Previn (1985–1992), Vladimir Ashkenazy (1987–1994), Yuri Temirkanov (1992–1998) and Daniele Gatti (1996–2009). Charles Dutoit was artistic director and principal conductor from 2009 until January 2018, when he resigned after allegations of sexual misconduct.

From 1992 to 2000, Peter Maxwell Davies was associate conductor and composer to the RPO. Other conductors with close ties to the orchestra have included Sir Charles Groves, Vernon Handley, Sir Charles Mackerras, Yehudi Menuhin, Gennady Rozhdestvensky and Leopold Stokowski. Pinchas Zukerman became the RPO's principal guest conductor in 2009. In January 2015, after several guest conducting appearances, Alexander Shelley was appointed Principal Associate Conductor of the Royal Philharmonic Orchestra, taking over the position from Grzegorz Nowak, who had served in the role since 2008.

Vasily Petrenko first guest-conducted the RPO in March 2016. In July 2018, the RPO announced the appointment of Petrenko as its new music director, with an initial contract of five years from the 2021–2022 season. In April 2024, the RPO announced the appointment of Joe Hisaishi as its next composer-in-association. In April 2024, the RPO announced the extension of Petrenko's contract as its music director through the 2029-2030 season.

== Recordings ==
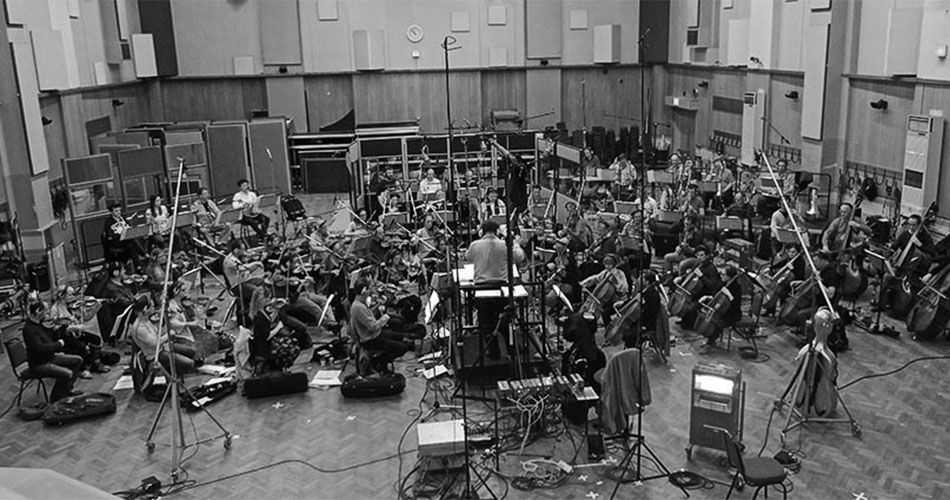
The Royal Philharmonic Orchestra recording a special classical segment for TV, film and advertising at Abbey Road Studios

From the RPO's earliest days to the end of Beecham's life, they made numerous recordings for His Master's Voice, CBS and RCA Victor. Among the works they recorded EMI chose several to be reissued at the end of the twentieth century in its "Great Recordings of the Century" series. They included a Delius programme; a Grieg programme; French ballet music; short works by Bizet, Chabrier, Fauré and Saint-Saëns; Tchaikovsky's Symphony No 4 and Nutcracker Suite; Mozart's Jupiter Symphony, Clarinet Concerto (Brymer) and Bassoon Concerto (Brooke); and Schubert's 3rd, 5th and 6th Symphonies.

After Beecham's death, the RPO made many recordings for Decca, sometimes under pseudonyms such as the "Beecham Symphony Orchestra", the "London Festival Orchestra" and the "Metropolitan Symphony Orchestra". In the 1960s, the RPO also recorded commercially with such conductors as Sir John Barbirolli, Fritz Reiner, Charles Munch, Georges Prêtre, Kempe, Previn and Stokowski. Soloists included Earl Wild, Shura Cherkassky, Alan Civil and Luciano Pavarotti.

Igor Stravinsky recorded his opera The Rake's Progress with the RPO in 1964. Colin Davis made some of his earliest recordings with the orchestra, including Mozart and Rossini overtures, Beethoven's Seventh Symphony, and Stravinsky's Oedipus rex. From 1964 to 1979 the RPO was engaged by Decca to record Gilbert and Sullivan operas with the D'Oyly Carte Opera Company. The orchestra has also recorded for Deutsche Grammophon, Lyrita, Philips, Pye and Unicorn-Kanchana.

In 1986, the orchestra launched RPO Records, claimed to be "the world's first record label to be owned by a symphony orchestra". Recordings available on the RPO label in 2013 ranged from core symphonic repertoire and Tchaikovsky ballet scores to film music by various composers, light music by Burt Bacharach and Richard Rodgers, and an album called "Symphonic Rock", described as "Over 3 hours of classic rock anthems and pop tracks with an orchestral twist".

== Non-classical work ==
As well as performing works from the classical repertoire, the RPO has recorded a number of film scores, including those for Powell and Pressburger's The Red Shoes and The Tales of Hoffmann. Other scores recorded by the RPO are Olivier's Richard III, The Bridge on the River Kwai, and The Private Life of Sherlock Holmes.

With Tony Bremner, Royal Philharmonic Orchestra rerecorded symphonic suites from various episodes of Star Trek: The Original Series. These recordings were released in 1985 under Label "X" in two volumes.

In 1987, the RPO established a sister ensemble, the Royal Philharmonic Concert Orchestra, which plays lighter classics. It succeeded a similar group, the Royal Philharmonic Pops Orchestra. In 1989, the RPO recorded the flamenco album Soy Gitano ("I am a gipsy man") with Camarón de la Isla.

RPO players have been involved with many performances away from the classical repertory. In the 1960s, they pioneered the "mixed media" concert, appearing with The Nice rock band. Later non-classical ventures included Yanni Live at the Acropolis, a concert held in Greece in 1993, conducted by Shahrdad Rohani; In 1992 UEFA commissioned the orchestra and the Academy of St Martin in the Fields chorus to record the UEFA Champions League Hymn. Jamaican reggae singers John Holt and Freddie McGregor performed with the orchestra in 2003 at the Hammersmith Apollo in London.

== Notes and references ==
Notes

Sources

- Blyth, Alan (1972). Colin Davis. London: Ian Allan. OCLC 675416.
- Cardus, Neville; et al. (1971). 25 Years of the Royal Philharmonic Orchestra. London: Fabbri. OCLC 22592704.
- Golding, Robin; Brendan Beales (1994). Notes to Grieg Piano Concerto in A minor and Lyric pieces. London: Tring. OCLC 36052553.
- Hill, Ralph, ed. (1951). Music 1951. Harmondsworth, England: Penguin Books. OCLC 26147349.
- Jenkins, Lyndon (2000). Notes to Bizet Symphony in C and L'Arlésienne Suites. London: EMI. OCLC 271816594.
- Jenkins, Lyndon (2005). While Spring and Summer Sang: Thomas Beecham and the music of Frederick Delius. Aldershot: Ashgate. ISBN 0-7546-0721-6.
- Lucas, John (2008). Thomas Beecham: An Obsession with Music. Woodbridge: Boydell Press. ISBN 978-1-84383-402-1.
- Morrison, Richard (2004). Orchestra. London: Faber. ISBN 0-571-21584-X.
- Osborne, Richard (1998). Herbert von Karajan: A Life in Music. London: Chatto and Windus. ISBN 1-85619-763-8.
- Peacock, Alan (chairman) (1970). Report on Orchestral Resources in Great Britain. London: Arts Council of Great Britain. ISBN 0-11-981062-X.
- Potts, Joseph E (1967). The Royal Philharmonic Orchestra, 1946–67. London: RPO. OCLC 9215763.
- Reid, Charles (1961). Thomas Beecham: An Independent Biography. London: Victor Gollancz. OCLC 500565141.
- Reid, Charles (1968). Malcolm Sargent: a biography. London: Hamish Hamilton. ISBN 0-8008-5080-7.
