= Jack Brymer =

English clarinettist

- Brymer in the 1950s

Background information
- Born: John Alexander Brymer; 27 January 1915; South Shields, County Durham, England
- Died: 16 September 2003 (aged 88) Redhill, Surrey, England
- Occupation: Musician

John Alexander Brymer OBE (27 January 1915 – 16 September 2003) was an English clarinettist and saxophonist. The Times called him "the leading clarinettist of his generation, perhaps of the century". He was largely self-taught as a player and he performed as an amateur before being invited by Sir Thomas Beecham to join the Royal Philharmonic Orchestra in 1947. He remained with the orchestra until 1963, two years after Beecham's death.

Brymer played in the BBC Symphony and London Symphony Orchestras. He was also associated with several chamber music ensembles, and maintained a lifelong pleasure in playing jazz. He held professorships during most of the period from 1950 to 1993, first at the Royal Academy of Music, then at the Royal Military School of Music and finally at the Guildhall School of Music. He was a regular broadcaster, as a player and presenter and made recordings of solo works and with orchestras and smaller ensembles. He published two volumes of memoirs and a book about the clarinet.

== Biography ==
=== Early years ===
Brymer was born in South Shields, County Durham, in the North East of England, the son of John Alexander Brymer, a builder, and his wife, Mary, née Dixon. Brymer senior played the clarinet, and his son started to attempt to play the instrument at the age of four. He had no formal instruction as a clarinettist, but discovered music and worked out an instrumental technique for himself. The Guardian wrote of him, "Struggling with an inadequate instrument (a sharp-pitch A clarinet with a bit sawn off in the school woodwork room) and playing in local bands and amateur orchestras with people much older than himself, he learned his craft in the most practical way." While still a boy he encountered, and appreciated, a wide range of musical styles from jazz and light music to brass-bands and circuses. He later insisted that all these genres had been of great value to him professionally.

Brymer was educated at Westoe Secondary School, South Shields, excelling at rugby football. He hankered after a musical career, but as a profile in The Gramophone put it, "The virtual collapse of the orchestral profession when sound entered the cinema, and musicians were thrown out of work by the hundred turned his thoughts elsewhere." From 1933 Brymer trained at Goldsmiths College, London University as a generalist teacher. He joined the teaching staff of Heath Clark School, Croydon, and in his spare time played in amateur musical ensembles. Among his fellow students at the college, and later his colleague in the amateur groups, was a string player, Joan Richardson. They married in 1939 when they were both 24. There was one son of the marriage.

Although he had no formal tuition as a clarinettist, Brymer maintained that nobody was entirely self-taught: "I learnt from everyone I heard play. Frederick Thurston and Reginald Kell unwittingly betrayed their methods to me, but I also decided that I wanted to play in certain ways that they had never done. The ability to play the clarinet is the ability to overcome the imperfections of the instrument. There's no such thing as a perfect clarinet, never was and never will be." Other clarinettists whose technique Brymer observed and learned from were Charles Draper and Haydn Draper. Brymer wrote of his predecessors, "They would have been astounded at the things they taught me, without a penny piece changing hands."

During the Second World War Brymer served in the Royal Air Force. After his basic training he was promoted to corporal and posted to Morecambe on the north west coast of England as a physical training instructor. When not on RAF duty he frequently played in the Morecambe Central Pier dance band dressed in his corporal's uniform. Among those he met in the Air Force was the horn player, Dennis Brain, who admired Brymer's playing, and who later had a decisive influence on his career.

=== Royal Philharmonic ===
In 1946, Sir Thomas Beecham founded the Royal Philharmonic Orchestra. Among his principal players were Kell and Brain. The following year Kell announced his forthcoming resignation, and Brain suggested to Beecham that Brymer would be a suitable replacement. Brymer had returned to his teaching post after being demobilised from the RAF, and was incredulous at receiving a telephone call from Beecham inviting him to audition. Brymer's first reaction was to think it was a practical joke, with one of his musical friends impersonating Beecham's familiar lordly drawl. Having realised that it was indeed Beecham calling, Brymer accepted the invitation to audition. Having heard him play, Beecham appointed him to succeed Kell. [4] His first appearance with the RPO was a week of broadcasting with them in Berlioz's opera "The Trojans". Subsequently, he had the good fortune to appear in Strauss' "Don Quixote" with the composer present. Brymer recalled "an old man in a raincoat leaning over my shoulder advising me of how to play the delicate clarinet solo which comes immediately after Don Quixote has died". – Richard Strauss in the last year of his life".[5] Many years later Brymer crossed swords with the conductor, Norman Del Mar over interpreting Strauss. A historian of the London Symphony Orchestra wrote, "Rehearsing Don Quixote, Del Mar had the temerity to admonish Brymer for playing a phrase too loudly: 'Just a memory, Jack, just a memory,' Del Mar called out. 'Why are you playing it mezzo-forte?' 'Because Strauss told me to,' Brymer retorted. 'And I'm surprised that you don't remember, Norman, because you were playing second horn at the time.'"

The Times said of Brymer in this period, "After his appointment to the RPO in 1947, the balding, affable Brymer was certainly Great Britain's pre-eminent clarinettist, … whose mellifluous playing style and unruffled platform manner charmed even those usually impervious to classical music." In the RPO, Brymer joined Beecham's starry line-up of wind players, Terence MacDonagh (oboe), Gerald Jackson (flute) and Gwydion Brooke (bassoon); collectively they became known to colleagues and audiences as "the Royal Family". A clarinettist of a later generation, Alan Hacker, wrote that the sound produced by Brymer and his colleagues was "expressive and instantly recognisable, even in just one solo note." With Beecham and the RPO, Brymer made the first of his three recordings of Mozart's Clarinet Concerto in 1958. When the recording was reissued on compact disc in 2001, The American Record Guide said,

The Clarinet Concerto has never been recorded better. Jack Brymer has the purest, most beautiful tone you will ever hear from a clarinet – never boxy, reedy, woody. Phrase after phrase you will marvel at the sheer beauty of his playing and his sound. He and Sir Thomas set a wonderful leisurely tempo for [the second movement], so it just unfolds, one gorgeous line at a time. They are luxuriating in some of the most beautiful music ever written; they refuse to drive it.

=== BBC, LSO, chamber music and jazz ===
After Beecham's death in 1961 Brymer and other members of the RPO including MacDonagh became unhappy about the management of the RPO. The BBC's controller of music, William Glock, invited Brymer and MacDonagh to move to the BBC Symphony Orchestra. Brymer was the orchestra's co-principal clarinettist from 1963 to 1971. He also began to play more often in chamber music. When Pierre Boulez became chief conductor of the BBC SO in 1971, the sound he sought from his players, "avant garde, harsher, more cutting in its edge", did not appeal to Brymer. He accepted an invitation to join the London Symphony Orchestra as co-principal with Gervase de Peyer. An example of Brymer's sound in his LSO years can be heard in a 1972 recording of Rachmaninoff's Symphony No 2, conducted by André Previn. The Gramophone praised Brymer's "distinctively refined tone-colour … breathtakingly expressive" in the slow movement.

In the classical chamber repertory, Brymer was associated with several groups. At various times in his career he was a founder-member of the Wigmore Ensemble, the Prometheus Ensemble and the London Baroque Ensemble. He was director of the London Wind Soloists, and a member of the Tuckwell Wind Quartet and the Robles Ensemble. Throughout his career Brymer enjoyed an interest in mainstream jazz. He performed as a soloist with many of the leading British and American jazz players of the post-war decades. When the RPO was in New Orleans on an American tour, Brymer improvised with local jazz stars, including Alphonse Picou.

=== Teaching, recording, broadcasting and later years ===
As a teacher, Brymer was professor at the Royal Academy of Music (1950–58), the Royal Military School of Music at Kneller Hall (1969–73), and the Guildhall School of Music (1981–93). Among his pupils at the Royal Academy was Alan Hacker, who like many players of the generation after Brymer was less attracted by the rich sound developed by Brymer, favouring instead more radical techniques propounded by Bruno Bartolozzi, and playing styles harking back to an earlier, less mellifluous, style of playing.

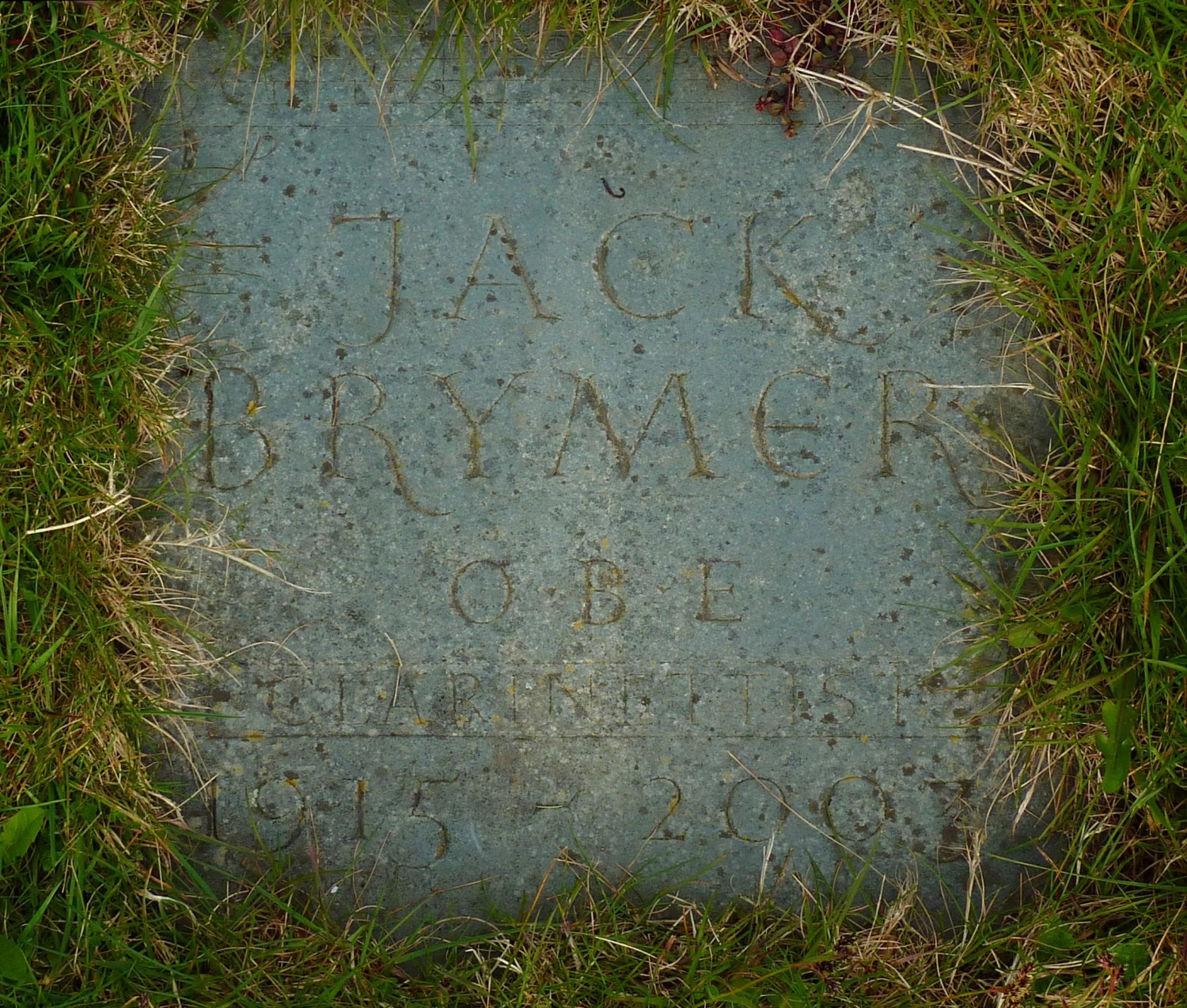
Jack Brymer's grave at St Peter's Church in Limpsfield, Surrey.

During his career Brymer made gramophone recordings of all Mozart's works for wind solo and ensemble. Several works were written for him, including Three Pieces and a Clarinet Quintet by Cecil Armstrong Gibbs; Roundelay by Alan Richardson; and a Clarinet Concerto by Guy Woolfenden. Brymer was also a well-known broadcaster. His biographer, Raymond Holden, writes, "his easy manner before the microphone meant that the radio programmes that he presented for the BBC, such as 'At Home', were popular favourites".

The LSO paid Brymer the unusual tribute of mounting a special concert to mark his 70th birthday, and another to mark his 75th. By the time of the latter he had retired from full-time orchestral playing, but he continued to perform, and played at a concert given by the English Chamber Orchestra to mark his 80th birthday, at which he played Mozart's Clarinet Concerto and Clarinet Quintet, and Weber's Clarinet Concerto No 1.

Brymer's last public concert was on 18 July 1997 at the Wigmore Hall in London where he performed Mozart's Clarinet Quintet with the Gabrieli Quartet. Before the performance, Brymer told the audience that the Quintet held a special importance for him and he thought it appropriate that this music should mark his farewell to the concert platform.

Brymer died in Redhill, Surrey at the age of 88. His ashes were interred a short distance away in the churchyard of St Peter's, Limpsfield, close to the grave of Beecham.

== Publications ==
=== Books ===
- Clarinet (Yehudi Menuhin Music Guides). London: Macdonald and Jane's. 1976. ISBN 0-356-08414-0. (also published in French and German editions)
- From Where I Sit. London: Cassell. 1979. ISBN 0-304-30313-5.
- In the Orchestra. London: Hutchinson. 1987. ISBN 0-09-168450-1.

=== Video ===
- Play the Clarinet. London: Novello and Co. 1990. OCLC 25931787.
