= BBC Symphony Orchestra =

British orchestra based in London

- Orchestra
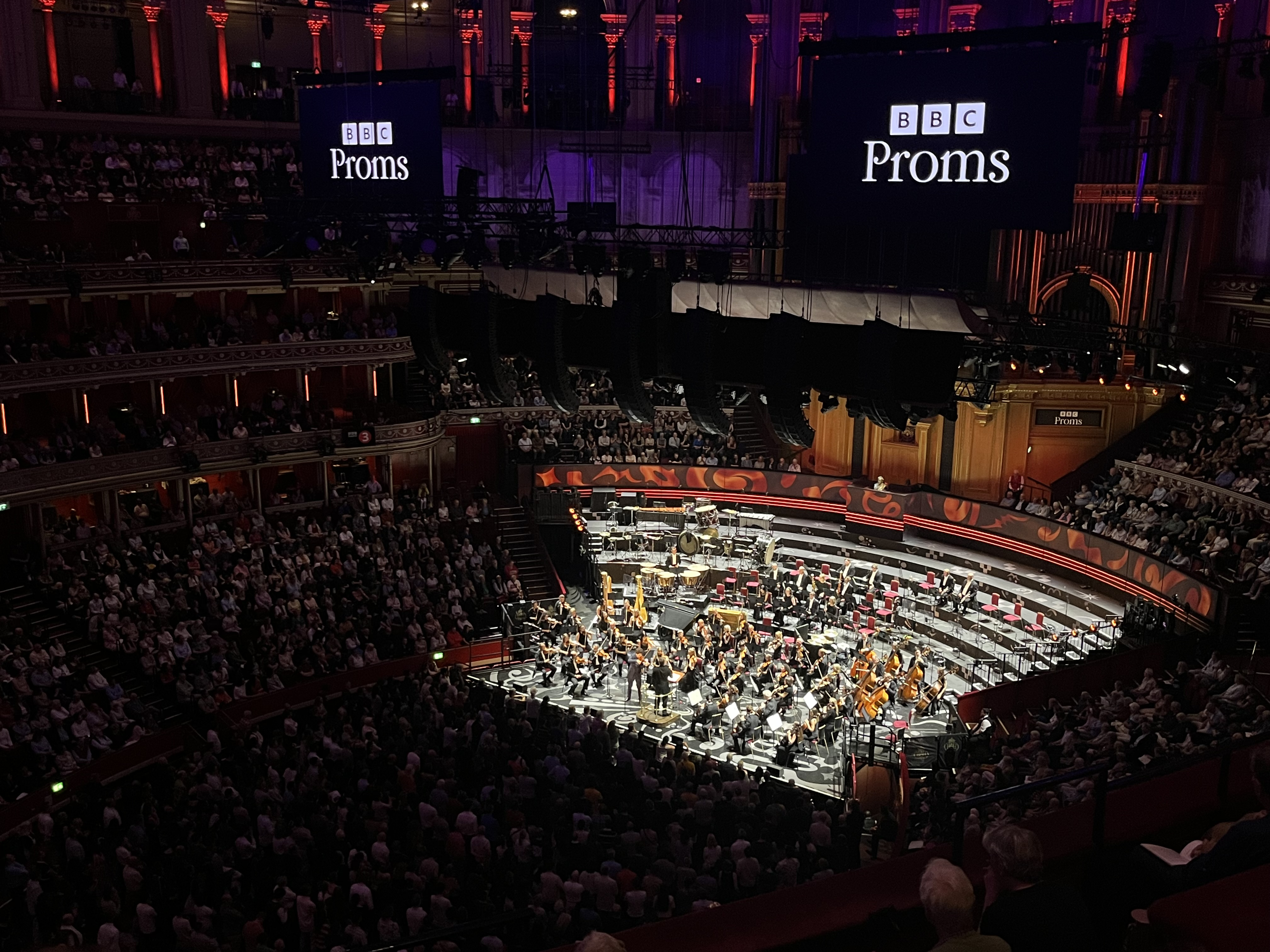
- BBC Symphony Orchestra at the Royal Albert Hall
- Short name: BBC SO
- Founded: 1930 (96 years ago)
- Location: London, United Kingdom
- Concert hall: Barbican Centre; Royal Albert Hall; Maida Vale Studios
- Principal conductor: Sakari Oramo
- Website: www.bbc.co.uk/symphonyorchestra

The BBC Symphony Orchestra (BBC SO) is a British orchestra based in London. Founded in 1930, it was the first permanent salaried orchestra in London, and is the only one of the city's five major symphony orchestras not to be self-governing. The BBC SO is the principal broadcast orchestra of the British Broadcasting Corporation (BBC).

The orchestra was originally conceived in 1928 as a joint enterprise by the BBC and the conductor Sir Thomas Beecham, but the latter withdrew the next year and the task of assembling and training the orchestra fell to the BBC's director of music, Adrian Boult. Among its guest conductors in its first years was Arturo Toscanini, who judged it the finest orchestra he had ever conducted. During and after the Second World War, Boult strove to maintain standards, but the senior management of the post-war BBC did not allocate the orchestra the resources to meet competition from new and well-funded rivals.

After Boult's retirement from the BBC in 1950, the orchestra went through a fallow period. Boult's successor, Sir Malcolm Sargent, was popular with the public but had poor rapport with his players, and orchestral morale dropped. Sargent's successor, Rudolf Schwarz, made relatively little impact, and although the BBC appointed high-profile chief conductors in the 1960s and 1970s – Antal Doráti, Colin Davis, Pierre Boulez and Gennady Rozhdestvensky – the BBC SO remained underfunded. However, because it was the sole symphony orchestra in London that offered its players full-time contracts, players of high repute, including Alan Civil (horn) and John Wilbraham (trumpet), enrolled as regular members.

As a result of initiatives begun in the 1960s by the BBC controller of music William Glock, performing standards rose appreciably. Under Andrew Davis in the 1990s and Jiří Bělohlávek in the 2000s, the orchestra prospered. By the second decade of the 21st century, the BBC SO was regarded by critics as of first-class status. From the outset, the orchestra has been known for pioneering new music, and it continues to do so, at the Proms, in concerts at the Barbican Centre, and in studio concerts from its base at BBC Maida Vale studios.

== History ==
=== Background ===
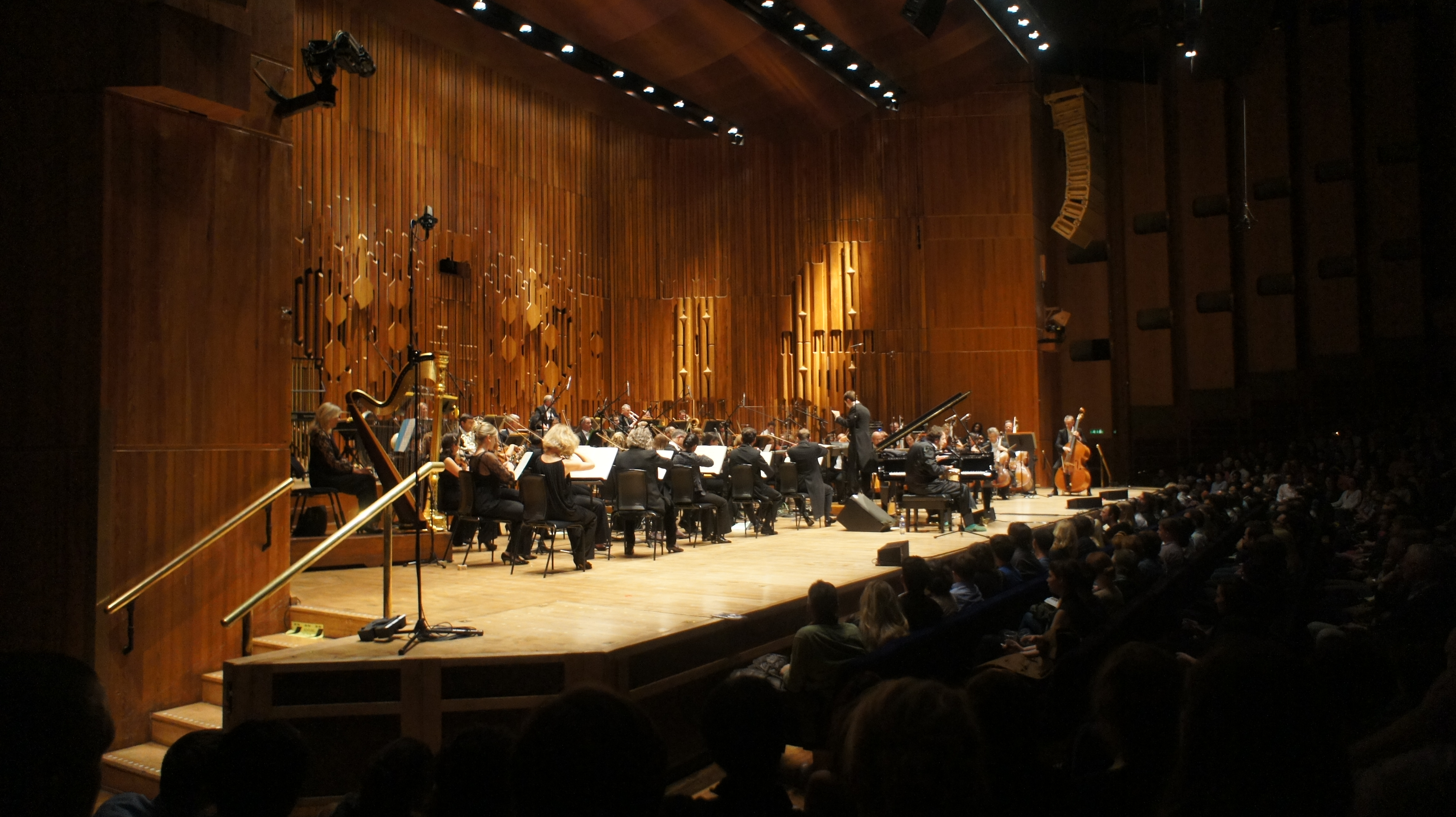
The BBC Symphony Orchestra at the Barbican in October 2012

Almost from its beginning in November 1922, the BBC had started broadcasting from its "2LO" transmitter with its own musical ensembles. The first such groups were the "2LO Dance Band", the "2LO Military Band", the "2LO Light Orchestra", and the "2LO Octette", all of which began broadcasting in 1923. No concert promoter would co-operate with the BBC, regarding it as a dangerous competitor, but the British National Opera Company allowed broadcasts of its performances from the Royal Opera House. John Reith, the general manager of the BBC, invited the opera company's musical director, Percy Pitt, to become the BBC's part-time musical adviser from May 1923. Later in the same year, Pitt conducted the BBC's first broadcast symphony concert, which included Dvořák's New World Symphony and works by Saint-Saëns, Elgar and Weber.

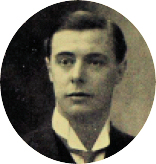
Percy Pitt, the BBC's first director of music

Pitt expanded the regular eight-piece studio ensemble to form The Wireless Orchestra of 18 players, augmented to 37 for important broadcasts. The augmented "Wireless Orchestra" conducted by Sir Landon Ronald made its first commercial recording in July 1924 by the acoustical process for His Master's Voice, Schubert's Rosamunde overture, which was issued in the following October. There was no thought at this stage that the BBC would maintain a full-scale symphonic orchestra of up to 100 players. With Reith's approval, Pitt engaged various orchestras for a BBC concert series in 1924 at the Methodist Central Hall Westminster. Pitt and Landon Ronald conducted the Royal Albert Hall Orchestra; Eugene Goossens conducted the London Symphony Orchestra; and Hamilton Harty and Sir Edward Elgar conducted the orchestra of the Royal Philharmonic Society.

In 1924, the Wireless Orchestra, by then comprising 22 players, was contracted for six concerts a week. The following year, Pitt, by now working full-time for the BBC, as its director of music, augmented the ensemble to form the "Wireless Symphony Orchestra" for a new series of concerts broadcast from Covent Garden, conducted by Bruno Walter, Ernest Ansermet and Pierre Monteux; at this time Reith also allowed Pitt and the Wireless Symphony Orchestra to contract with the Columbia Graphophone Company to make a substantial series of electrically recorded discs, most of which were recorded in the Methodist Central Hall Westminster which the BBC had previously used for concerts. In 1927 the BBC and Covent Garden collaborated in a series of public concerts with an orchestra of 150 players under conductors including Richard Strauss and Siegfried Wagner. Although the orchestra was large, it was not good. The BBC attempted to stop its contracted players sending deputies to rehearsals and even to concerts, but was unsuccessful. (Note: Despite the efforts of Sir Henry Wood, Sir Thomas Beecham and others, the "deputy system" remained a traditional part of the London orchestral scene. A player booked for a concert could accept a better-paid engagement and send a substitute in his stead. The treasurer of the Royal Philharmonic Society described the system thus: "A, whom you want, signs to play at your concert. He sends B (whom you don't mind) to the first rehearsal. B, without your knowledge or consent, sends C to the second rehearsal. Not being able to play at the concert, C sends D, whom you would have paid five shillings to stay away.") In January 1928 The Musical Times protested:

The B.B.C. has been blamed for devoting too much time to the classics, and also for not giving them all that is due to them; it has been held responsible for the inferiority of the apparatus of the listener-in; it has been censured on a variety of trifling points, but never for the one heinous offence it has committed, and goes on committing: for this corporation, with all its assured and conspicuous wealth, has given and is giving us the worst orchestral performances ever heard in London. … This year at Queen's Hall they have assembled an orchestra which sounds as if it were composed in great part of "substitutes".

In 1927, the BBC took over the responsibility for the Promenade Concerts, widely known as "the Proms". At first Henry Wood, the founding conductor, persuaded the corporation to engage his Queen's Hall Orchestra for each Prom season; from 1930 onwards, the BBC provided the orchestra.

The inadequacy of the BBC's players, and also of the established London orchestras, was shown up by the Berlin Philharmonic, under Wilhelm Furtwängler, in two concerts in 1927. A historian of the Queen's Hall, Robert Elkin, writes, "At this period the standard of orchestral playing in London was distinctly low, and the well-drilled efficiency of the Berliners under their dynamic conductor came as something of a revelation." These, and later concerts by the same orchestra, gained plaudits from the public and music critics at the expense of the London orchestras. The chief music critic of The Times, Frank Howes, later commented, "the British public ... was electrified when it heard the disciplined precision of the Berlin Philharmonic... This apparently was how an orchestra could, and, therefore, ought to sound". After the Berliners, London heard a succession of major foreign orchestras, including the Amsterdam Concertgebouw Orchestra under Willem Mengelberg and the Philharmonic-Symphony Orchestra of New York under Arturo Toscanini.

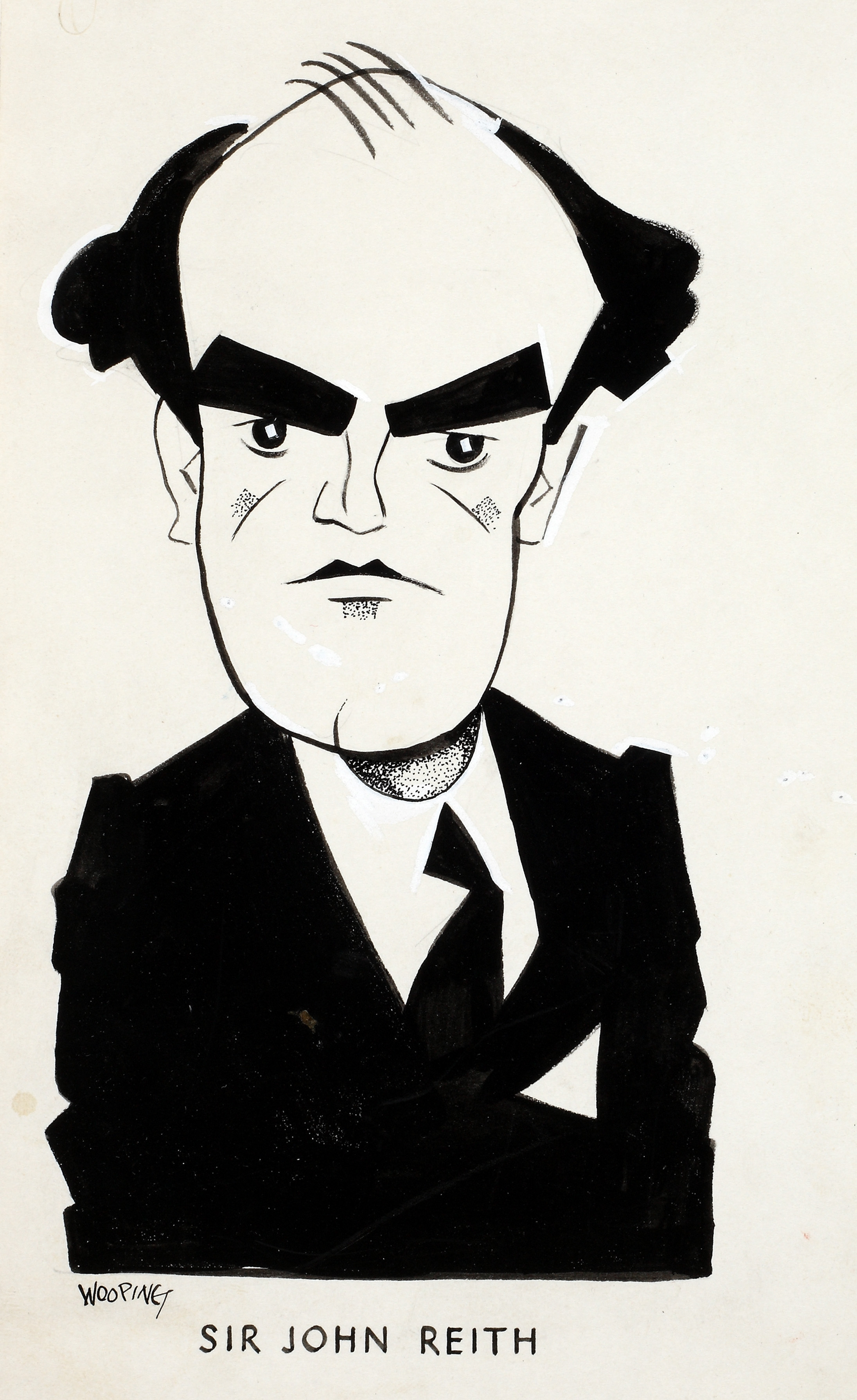
John Reith, Director-General of the BBC

Among those determined that London should have a permanent orchestra of similar excellence were Reith and the conductor Sir Thomas Beecham. The latter aimed at setting up a first-rate ensemble for opera and concert performances and, though no admirer of broadcasting, he was willing to negotiate with the BBC if this gave him what he sought. Reith's concern was that the BBC should have a first-rate radio orchestra. The critic Richard Morrison writes:

Reith's BBC of the 1920s was ... imbued with an almost religious zeal for "enlightening" the public through the magical medium of the wireless. An orchestra, and particularly one that was unencumbered by commercial constraints and thus free to deliver the highest of highbrow programmes, would fit very well into that idealistic philosophy.

Landon Ronald brought Reith and Beecham together in April 1928; negotiations and preliminary arrangements continued for more than 18 months until it became clear that the corporation and the conductor had irreconcilable priorities for the proposed new ensemble. Beecham withdrew and, as described by Nicholas Kenyon:

With the collapse of the Beecham scheme, the way was open for the BBC's music department to design an orchestral scheme truly suited to broadcasting needs – a plan for a 114-piece orchestra that could split into four different smaller groups, which had been devised in the autumn of 1929 by Edward Clark and Julian Herbage – and to place that orchestra's fortunes under the direction of the man who was to guide it with the utmost distinction for the next 20 years, the BBC's new director of music, Adrian Boult.

=== Foundation ===
By the time Adrian Boult succeeded Pitt as director of music for the BBC, the violinist Albert Sammons and the violist Lionel Tertis had scouted for new talent around the country on behalf of the corporation. Twenty-seven players had been offered positions in the new orchestra. Among those who joined were Aubrey Brain, Arthur Catterall, Eugene Cruft, Sidonie Goossens, Lauri Kennedy and Frederick Thurston. Although many of the principals were stars recruited from the LSO, the Hallé and other ensembles such as the British Symphony Orchestra which Boult had conducted from 1920 to 1923 (with Sammons as leader and Cruft as principal bass), a high proportion of the rank and file members were fresh from music colleges. Boult wrote, "a brilliant group of young and inexperienced players came to sit behind the well-known old stagers."

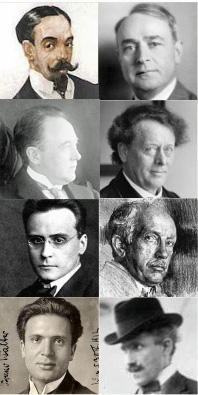
Guest conducting the BBC SO in the 1930s: from top left, clockwise, Beecham, Koussevitzky, Mengelberg, Richard Strauss, Toscanini, Walter, Webern, Weingartner

A substantial number of the players performed at the 1930 Promenade Concerts under Wood, and the full BBC Symphony Orchestra gave its first concert on 22 October 1930, conducted by Boult at the Queen's Hall. The programme consisted of music by Wagner, Brahms, Saint-Saëns and Ravel. Of the 21 programmes in the orchestra's first season, Boult conducted nine and Wood five. (Note: The other concerts were divided between Ansermet, Hermann Scherchen, Oskar Fried, Landon Ronald and Albert Coates)

The reviews of the new orchestra were enthusiastic. The Times wrote of its "virtuosity" and of Boult's "superb" conducting. The Musical Times commented, "The boast of the B.B.C. that it intended to get together a first-class orchestra was not an idle one", spoke of "exhilaration at the playing", and called another concert later in the season "an occasion for national pride". The Observer called the playing "altogether magnificent". After the initial concerts Reith was told by his advisers that the orchestra had played better for Boult than anyone else. Reith asked him if he wished to take on the chief conductorship, and if so whether he would resign as director of music or occupy both posts simultaneously. Boult opted for the latter.

During the 1930s, the orchestra became renowned for its high standard of playing and for performing new and unfamiliar music. The pioneering work of Boult and the BBC SO included an early performance of Schoenberg's Variations, Op. 31, British premieres, including Berg's Wozzeck and Three Movements from the Lyric Suite, and world premieres, including Vaughan Williams's Symphony No. 4 in F minor. Anton Webern conducted eight BBC SO concerts between 1931 and 1936.

During the 1930s the orchestra presented rarely heard large-scale works from the past, including Berlioz's Grande Messe des morts and Grande symphonie funèbre et triomphale. Mahler's Eighth and Ninth Symphonies, and Purcell's King Arthur.

The excellence of the orchestra attracted leading international conductors. In its second season guest conductors included Richard Strauss, Felix Weingartner and Bruno Walter, followed, in later seasons, by Serge Koussevitzky, Beecham and Mengelberg. Arturo Toscanini, widely regarded at the time as the world's leading conductor, conducted the BBC SO in 1935 and later said that it was the finest he had ever directed. He returned to conduct the orchestra in 1937, 1938 and 1939, and declared, "This is the orchestra I would like to take round the world."

=== Second World War and postwar ===
On the outbreak of war in September 1939 the BBC put into effect its contingency plans to minimise disruption of broadcasting. The corporation withdrew from responsibility for the Proms, with which Wood went ahead, backed by the Royal Philharmonic Society, with the LSO replacing the BBC SO. The BBC SO was relocated from London to Bristol. More than 40 players were released for active service, including the 30 youngest members; the orchestra was reduced to a complement of 70, although it was increased to 90 later in the war. During 1940 and 1941 Bristol suffered devastation from German air-raids, and the BBC decided to move the orchestra again. In September 1941 the BBC SO took up residence in Bedford, where it remained, giving live broadcasts and making recordings until it returned permanently to its London base at the BBC's BBC Maida Vale studios in 1945. The BBC resumed its support for the Proms in 1942, with the BBC SO returning temporarily to London during the Proms seasons of 1942–45. For the rest of the year, the orchestra played in the hall of Bedford School, and after the launch of the V-1 raids in 1944 the remaining broadcast concerts of that year's Proms season were performed at the Bedford Corn Exchange.

Boult had striven to maintain the orchestra's standards and prestige during the war; as an instance of its prowess in the 1940s Kennedy cites a His Master's Voice recording of Elgar's Second Symphony released in January 1945: "a performance that blazed with excitement and passion and is documentary evidence of the excellence of the orchestra in 1944". With Reith long gone from the post of director-general, Boult found that the top management of the BBC was less concerned for the status of its Symphony Orchestra. The new director-general, Sir William Haley, was unwilling to approve the funding needed to keep the orchestra competitive with new rivals – Walter Legge's Philharmonia and Beecham's Royal Philharmonic. Some younger players felt that many BBC SO principals were past their best. Steuart Wilson, the new Director of Music who had previously been married to Boult's wife Ann, engineered Boult's retirement in 1950, Wilson had neglected to secure a successor of similar eminence to take over the orchestra. His efforts to recruit Sir John Barbirolli and Rafael Kubelík were unsuccessful, and he was obliged to offer the post to his third choice, Sir Malcolm Sargent, on whatever terms Sargent demanded.

=== 1950s ===
Sargent, an immensely popular figure with the public, was not at all popular with orchestral players, because of what a historian of the Proms has called his "autocratic and prima-donna attitude towards orchestral players". He offended the BBC SO players by demanding that they all stand up when he came on to the platform – which they firmly declined to do. He rapidly became equally unpopular with the BBC music department, ignoring its agenda and pursuing his own. He refused to join the staff of the BBC, and insisted on remaining a freelance, taking numerous external engagements to the detriment of his work with the BBC SO. A senior BBC manager wrote:

Except when a Barbirolli or a Kletzki has been in charge for a few days, the Orchestra is inferior, as an artistic instrument, to the Hallé or Philharmonia... [Sargent] is indifferent to the morale and welfare of the Orchestra and to the individual temperaments of his players as artists or as human beings.

It did not help that Sargent was universally acknowledged to be at his finest in choral music. His reputation in big works for chorus and orchestra such as The Dream of Gerontius, Hiawatha's Wedding Feast and Belshazzar's Feast was unrivalled, and his large-scale performances of Handel oratorios were assured packed houses. However, his regular programming of such works did nothing to lift the spirits of the BBC SO: orchestral musicians regarded playing the instrumental accompaniment for large choirs as drudgery.

In the 1950s, the BBC SO, in common with the rest of the BBC's musical organisation, suffered from stagnation. In the words of the critic Peter Heyworth, "the Corporation's music department had become a byword for its narrow-mindedness and lassitude". Boult had been followed as director of music by a series of successors between 1944 and 1959 who either lacked his commitment to modern music or were actively hostile to it. Richard Howgill, who held the post from 1952 to 1959, took the view that although Webern "might have been a small composer of some significance, Schoenberg wasn't really a composer at all." In addition to working under a conductor it disliked, the BBC SO found its role as a pioneer of progressive music gone, and its performances of the standard classics criticised as under-rehearsed (particularly during Proms seasons) compared with those given by Legge's Philharmonia and others. Sargent's contract was not renewed in 1957, although he continued as chief conductor of the Proms until his death ten years later. Howgill appointed Rudolf Schwarz as chief conductor of the BBC SO. Schwarz failed to restore orchestral standards to pre-war levels, and lacked Sargent's box-office appeal. Under Schwarz, BBC SO concerts other than the Proms drew poor houses – as low as 29 per cent of capacity in the 1959–60 season. The manager of the Royal Festival Hall, Ernest Bean, spoke of "an inherited aura of mediocrity about BBC concerts which keeps people away". Schwarz's five-year contract was not renewed when it expired.

=== 1960s to 1980s ===
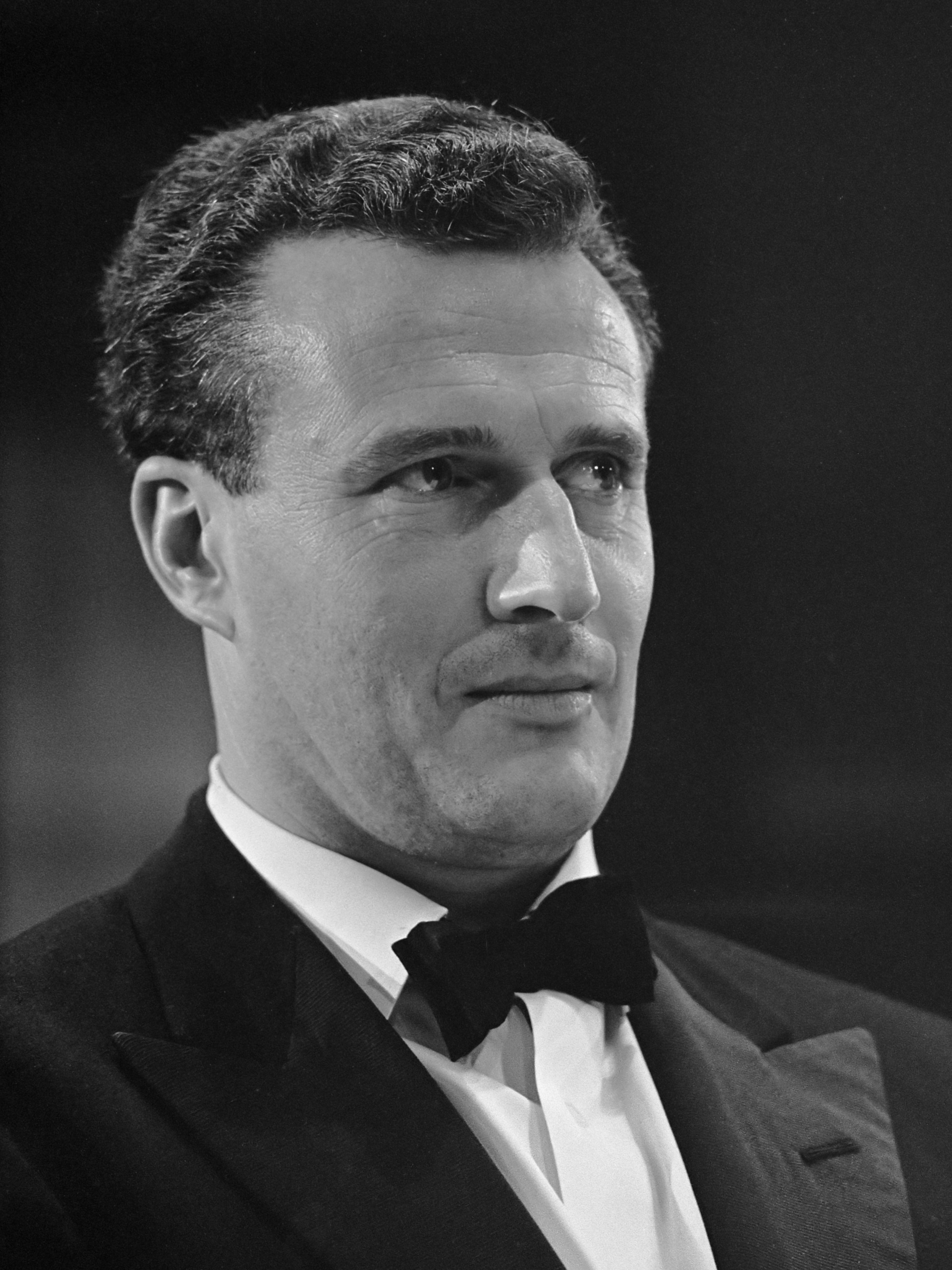
Colin
Davis

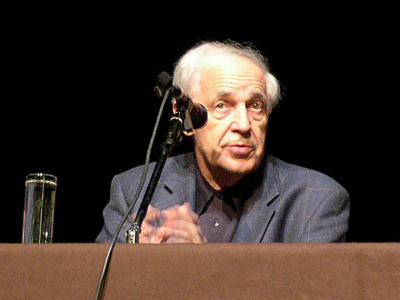
Pierre
Boulez

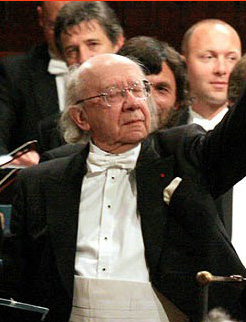
Gennady
Rozhdestvensky

In 1959, the BBC appointed William Glock as controller of music. During Glock's tenure, the profile and fortunes of the BBC SO began to rise. Glock engaged Antal Doráti as the orchestra's principal conductor. Heyworth judged that Doráti raised standards of playing and brought new vigour to the programmes in his four years in charge (1962–1966). Doráti was convinced that the orchestra was stultified by concentrating on studio broadcasts, as it did except during the Proms season. He strove to free players from "slavery to the microphone", and Glock promoted a regular series of concerts at the Festival Hall. The music critic Tom Sutcliffe later wrote that Doráti and his successors, Colin Davis (1967–71), Pierre Boulez (1971–75) and Gennady Rozhdestvensky (1978–81) had been partly successful in improving playing standards, but had not brought the orchestra up to its original level of distinction.

By 1962, Glock had persuaded the BBC management to increase the orchestra's budget to allow for joint principals in the string sections, to attract top musicians who could play in the BBC SO without having to give up their solo or chamber careers. The following season, he was able to engage joint principals for the wind section, including Jack Brymer and Terence MacDonagh, formerly members of Beecham's celebrated "Royal Family" in the RPO. The problem remained that recruiting rank-and-file string players was difficult: although the BBC offered secure employment and a pension, it did not pay as well as its London rivals. After 1964, the BBC SO was the only one of the five London symphony orchestras that was not self-governed, (Note: The LSO had been self-governing from its foundation in 1904, and the other three followed suit when their founders withdrew (or died): the LPO in 1940, the RPO in 1961 and the (New) Philharmonia in 1964.) and some musicians felt that the BBC SO's constitution as a body of salaried employees, with no say in the management or repertory of the orchestra, attracted an unadventurous type of player. A former member of the BBC SO said in 1979,

I felt I was getting too secure ... [in] the BBC Symphony you can be a poor player, but if you're on time and never moan at the conductor … you'll have no trouble... I think the BBC Symphony lost some good young players because the management got their priorities wrong.

Glock was well known as a proponent of music of the Second Viennese School and their successors; earlier in his career he had been dismissed as music critic of The Observer for such views as "no great composer has ever cared how 'pleasant' his music sounds". Under his administration, the BBC SO gave world premieres of works by composers including Roberto Gerhard, Peter Maxwell Davies and Michael Tippett, and UK premieres of works by, among others, Luciano Berio, Boulez and Edgard Varèse. The policy of commissioning works, and giving UK premieres of new compositions was continued under Glock's successors. World or UK premieres in the 1970s included works by Elliott Carter, György Ligeti, Witold Lutosławski, Olivier Messiaen, Luigi Nono, Arvo Pärt and Karlheinz Stockhausen. BBC commissions premiered by the BBC SO in the 1980s included Alfred Schnittke's Second Symphony, Harrison Birtwistle's Earth Dances, and John Tavener's The Protecting Veil.

Although Glock restored the orchestra's reputation as Britain's leading modern music ensemble, the balance of programming affected the players' capacity in the mainstream repertoire. The principal horn, Alan Civil, recalled:

"We did about eighty percent modern and twenty percent classical. The awful tragedy, for the orchestra, was that eventually we were not able to play the standard classics. We could sight-read the most fearsome contemporary piece, but a Brahms symphony – embarrassing!"

The bassoon player William Waterhouse who joined the BBC SO from the LSO found the BBC's repertory refreshing, but the music making less impressive: "

There were no potboilers, but also, I'm afraid, no world-ranking soloists either."

John Pritchard was principal conductor from 1982 to 1989. In The Times, Paul Griffiths wrote:

"Sir John's seven-year period with the orchestra has been marked by growing orchestral confidence and many memorable performances." Principal guest conductors in the 1970s and 1980s included Sir Charles Mackerras (1977–1979), Michael Gielen (1978–1981), Günter Wand, Mark Elder (1982–1985) and Péter Eötvös (1985–1988).

=== 1990s and 21st century ===
Pritchard's successor was Andrew Davis, beginning in 1989. He held the post until 2000, the longest-serving chief conductor since Boult. He was at the helm for what John Allison in The Times called "the valuable Barbican weekends that each January investigate another major but not fully understood 20th-century composer." Noting that modern music was central to the work of Davis and the orchestra, Allison added that under Davis the orchestra took part in "once-in-a-lifetime projects such as Anthony Payne's completion of Elgar's Third Symphony." Upon Davis's departure, the orchestra appointed him its first conductor laureate.

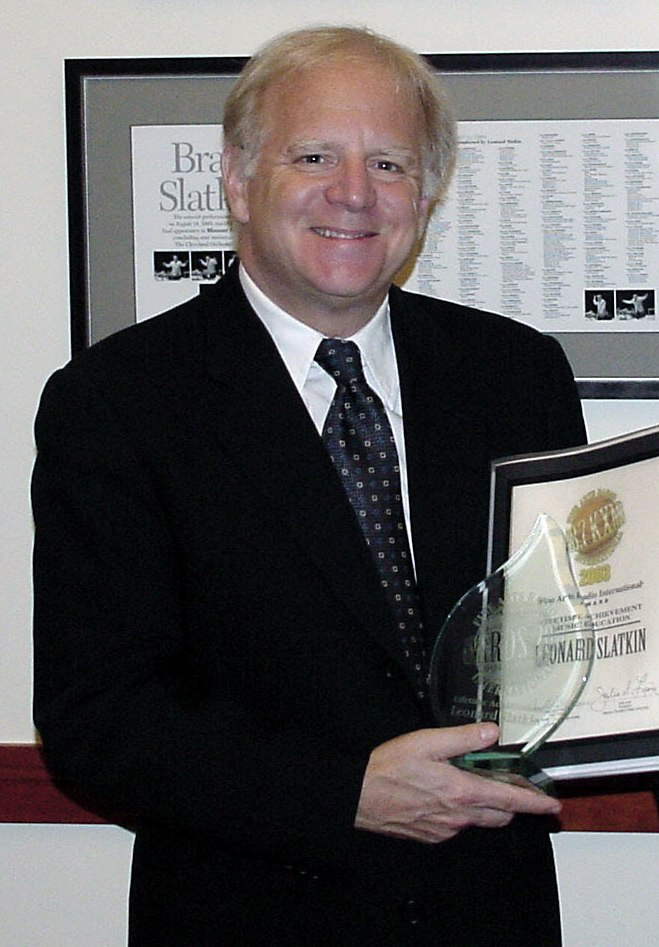
Leonard Slatkin

Leonard Slatkin succeeded Davis as chief conductor, from 2000 to 2004. His relationship with the players was reported to be uneasy, and his choice of repertoire received criticism. In February 2005, Jiří Bělohlávek was named the orchestra's next chief conductor, effective with the 2006 Proms season. He was principal guest conductor of the orchestra from 1995 to 2000, and was the first past principal guest conductor of the orchestra to be named its chief conductor. The classical repertory was regarded as one of Bělohlávek's strengths, but he had no reputation for conducting new works, which remained a core part of the orchestra's remit. He welcomed the fact that the orchestra's new principal guest conductor was David Robertson, a new-music expert and a protégé of Boulez. The orchestra was seen by some as "a bolshie lot" and "grumpy", but its relations with Bělohlávek were harmonious. Under Bělohlávek the orchestra won glowing reviews: The Times referred to its "superb musicians", Michael Kennedy in The Sunday Telegraph referred to a "rich and opulent [score] magnificently played by the BBC Symphony Orchestra" under Bělohlávek, and another Telegraph critic praised the BBC SO's "virtuoso form".

In addition to Bělohlávek and Robertson, other principal guest conductors of the orchestra from this period included Alexander Lazarev (1992–1995) and Jukka-Pekka Saraste (2002–2005). Robertson's tenure as principal guest conductor concluded in 2012. In October 2011, Sakari Oramo made his first guest conducting appearance with the BBC SO, his first guest-conducting engagement with any London orchestra. On the basis of this concert, in February 2012, Oramo was named the orchestra's 13th Chief Conductor, with an initial contract of 3 years, effective with the First Night of the 2013 Proms season. In September 2015, the BBC SO announced the extension of his contract to the 2019–2020 season. In May 2018, the BBCSO indicated a further extension of Oramo's contract through 2022. In October 2020, the BBC SO announced a further extension of Oramo's contract as chief conductor through September 2023, the scheduled conclusion of the 2023 Proms season. In April 2022, the BBC SO announced an additional extension of Oramo's contract as chief conductor through the close of the 2025–2026 season. In September 2024, the BBC SO announced a further extension of Oramo's contract as chief conductor to 2030. Oramo is currently the longest-serving chief conductor of the orchestra since Adrian Boult.

In August 2012, the BBC SO announced the appointment of Semyon Bychkov to a newly created conducting post with the orchestra, the Günter Wand Conducting Chair. In January 2019, the BBC SO announced the appointment of Dalia Stasevska as its next principal guest conductor, the first woman ever to be named to the post and the second female conductor ever to be given a titled post with a BBC orchestra. In January 2025, the BBC SO announced the most recent extension of Stasevska's contract as principal guest conductor, through September 2027.

=== Function in the 21st century ===
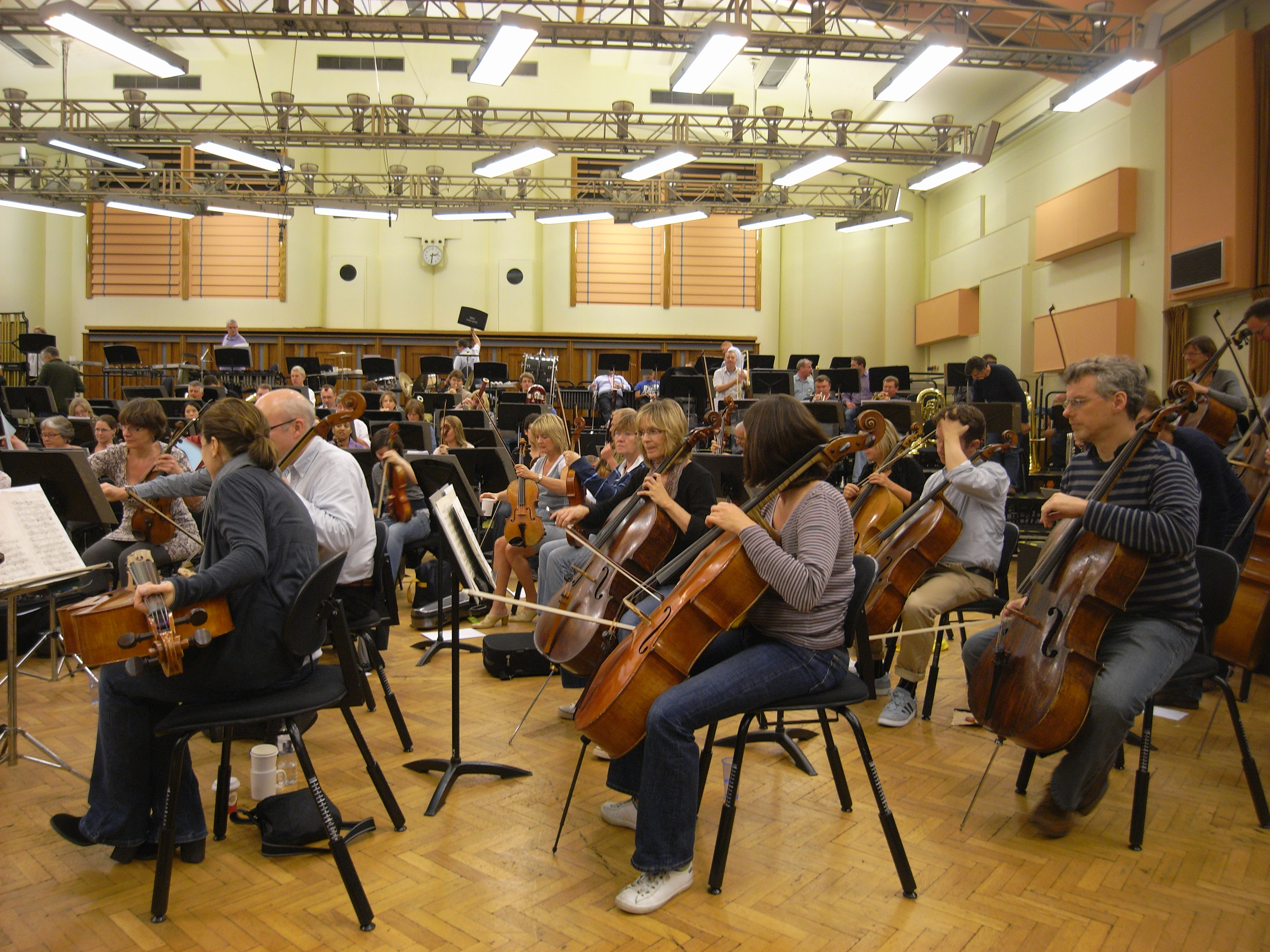
BBC SO rehearsing for the Last Night of the Proms in September 2011

The BBC SO is the associate orchestra of the Barbican Centre in London, where it gives an annual season of concerts. These seasons include series of concerts devoted to individual modern composers, who have included John Cage, James MacMillan, Elliott Carter, Sofia Gubaidulina, Michael Tippett, George Benjamin, Roberto Carnevale and Thomas Adès.

The orchestra remains the principal orchestra of the Proms, giving about a dozen concerts each season, including the first and last nights. Most of its concerts are broadcast on BBC Radio 3, streamed online and available as podcasts for a month after broadcast, and a number are televised: the orchestra's website claims that this gives the BBC "the highest broadcast profile of any UK orchestra". The orchestra continues to make studio recordings for Radio 3 at the Maida Vale studios; some recording sessions are free for the public to attend.

In common with other orchestras, the BBC SO engages in educational work. According to the orchestra's website: "Among ongoing projects are the BBC SO Family Music Intro scheme, introducing families to live classical music, BBC SO Student Zone and the highly successful BBC SO Family Orchestra, alongside work in local schools. Total Immersion composer events also provide rich material for education work."

In 2000, the orchestra appointed its first associate composer, Mark-Anthony Turnage. John Adams became the BBC Symphony Orchestra's artist in association in June 2003. The composer and conductor Oliver Knussen took up the post of artist-in-association in July 2009. The orchestra's commitment to new music continues. In 2013, the music journalist Tom Service wrote, "I've heard the BBC Symphony give concerts that I don't think any other orchestra in the world could do as brilliantly … That supreme virtuosity in new music makes them unique among London's big orchestras."

== Recordings ==
From their first years the BBC SO and its predecessor the BBC Wireless SO were active in commercial recording studios. Under Percy Pitt the Wireless SO recorded mostly shorter works and some that were abridged, but represented composers as diverse as Glazunov, Tchaikovsky (the entire Nutcracker Suite on six 78 rpm sides, for instance), Mendelssohn, Wolf-Ferrari, Puccini, Rimsky-Korsakov, Rossini, and Grieg, as well as a few recordings with the BBC Wireless Singers directed by Stanford Robinson. Under Boult the BBC Symphony Orchestra recorded a wide range of music from Bach to Mozart and Beethoven, Brahms, Wagner and Elgar. In the 1950s and 1960s it recorded a range of music with Sargent, mostly British but with several Sibelius discs in addition. With Doráti the orchestra made recordings of works by Bartók, Gerhard and Messiaen. Under Colin Davis it made its first opera sets: Mozart's Idomeneo and The Marriage of Figaro, and Berlioz's Benvenuto Cellini, as well as works by Beethoven and Tippett. Under Boulez the orchestra recorded mostly twentieth century music – works by Bartók, Berg, Schoenberg and Boulez himself – and also Berlioz. Andrew Davis has recorded extensively with the orchestra for the Teldec label and others. Under Bělohlávek the orchestra has recorded Martinů's complete symphonies, and also his The Epic of Gilgamesh.

With guest conductors, the BBC SO has recorded Elgar and Vaughan Williams under the composers, Beethoven under Toscanini, Bruno Walter and Barbirolli, and Sibelius under Beecham and Koussevitsky.

== See also ==
- BBC Scottish Symphony Orchestra

== Sources ==
- Aldous, Richard (2001). Tunes of Glory: The Life of Malcolm Sargent. London: Hutchinson. ISBN 0-09-180131-1.
- Boult, Adrian (1973). My Own Trumpet. London: Hamish Hamilton. ISBN 0-241-02445-5.
- Briggs, Asa (1995). The History of Broadcasting in the United Kingdom. Oxford: Oxford University Press. ISBN 0-19-212967-8.
- Cox, David (1980). The Henry Wood Proms. London: BBC. ISBN 0-563-17697-0.
- Doctor, Jenny; et al. (2007). Jenny Doctor; David Wright; Nicholas Kenyon (eds.). The Proms: A New History. London: Thames & Hudson. ISBN 978-0-500-51352-1.
- Elkin, Robert (1944). Queen's Hall, 1893–1941. London: Rider. OCLC 636583612.
- Glock, William (1991). Notes in Advance. Oxford and New York: Oxford University Press. ISBN 0-19-816192-1.
- Hill, Ralph (1951). Music 1951. Harmondsworth: Penguin Books. OCLC 26147349.
- Jacobs, Arthur (1994). Henry J. Wood: Maker of the Proms. London: Methuen. ISBN 0-413-69340-6.
- Kennedy, Michael (1987). Adrian Boult. London: Hamish Hamilton. ISBN 0-333-48752-4.
- Kenyon, Nicholas (1981). The BBC Symphony Orchestra – The First Fifty Years, 1930–1980. London: British Broadcasting Corporation. ISBN 0-563-17617-2.
- Morrison, Richard (2004). Orchestra. London: Faber and Faber. ISBN 0-571-21584-X.
- Peacock, Alan (1970). A Report on Orchestral Resources in Great Britain. London: Arts Council of Great Britain. OCLC 150610520.
- Previn, André (1979). Orchestra. London: Macdonald and Jane's. ISBN 0-354-04420-6.
- Reid, Charles (1961). Thomas Beecham – An Independent Biography. London: Victor Gollancz. OCLC 500565141.
- Shore, Bernard (1938). The Orchestra Speaks. London: Longmans. OCLC 499119110.
