= Manuel Gomez (clarinettist) =

Spanish clarinettist (1859 - 1922)

Manuel Gomez (1859–1922) was a Spanish clarinettist and founding member of the London Symphony Orchestra. Gomez is believed to have been responsible for introducing the Boehm system to the United Kingdom.
