= Henry Holst String Quartet =

Danish musical ensemble

The Henry Holst String Quartet was founded by the Danish violinist Henry Holst in 1931. Holst had studied at the Royal Danish Conservatory under Axel Gade and Carl Nielsen. In 1923, he was appointed leader of the Berlin Philharmonic Orchestra, but in 1931 he moved to Manchester as a Professor at the Royal Manchester College of Music.

The move to Manchester led to the formation of the Henry Holst String Quartet with Charles Taylor (second violin), Herbert Downes (viola) and Anthony Pini (cello). The ensemble was recognised as fine quartet, touring extensively in the UK and broadcasting on BBC Radio. They played a number of times in Liverpool for the Rodewald Concert Society in the 1934 and 1937 seasons.

Ernest Element (2nd violin) and Frank Venton (viola) also sometimes played for the quartet. Herbert Downes left to lead his own quartet in 1935. Charles Taylor also left to found his own quartet and was replaced by Reginald Stead as second violin. Reginald Stead later became the leader of the BBC Northern Orchestra. Anthony Pini joined the London Philharmonic Orchestra in 1932 and was replaced by John C Hock as cellist. The Henry Holst Quartet finally disbanded when Henry Holst formed the Philharmonia Quartet in 1941 at the instigation of Walter Legge to record for Columbia Records.
