= Philharmonia Quartet =

The Philharmonia Quartet was an English string quartet musical ensemble founded during the early 1940s out of the Liverpool Philharmonic Orchestra, though some of its members had collaborated during the 1930s in earlier ensembles. The formal career of the quartet ended in 1952. It is not to be confused with the Philharmonia Quartet Berlin, founded by Daniel Stabrawa and other members of the Berlin Philharmonic Orchestra in 1985 (often referred to as the Philharmonia Quartet), nor with the Philharmonic Quartet.

== Personnel ==
- 1st violin: Henry Holst
- 2nd violin: Ernest Element - Wise
- viola: Herbert Downes - Riddle
- violoncello: Anthony Pini

== Origins ==
The gathering of these four very distinguished musicians resulted in some of the most dynamic chamber concertizing immediately at the end of the war. Henry Holst (b. 1899), a pupil of Axel Gade, had been leader of the Berlin Philharmonic Orchestra from 1923 to 1931. By 1931, Herbert Downes (1909-2004), a student of Paul Beard and Carl Flesch, held the viola desk in the Henry Holst Quartet. In 1935, Downes was leading his own quartet. Anthony Pini (1902-1989) had recorded the Schubert C major Quintet and the Brahms B flat major Sextet (No. 1) with the Pro Arte Quartet (for His Master's Voice) during the 1930s. In 1940 Herbert Downes moved to the BBC Scottish Orchestra and from there to the Liverpool Philharmonic Orchestra, and from 1945 to 1974 became principal viola of the Philharmonia Orchestra. Henry Holst and Anthony Pini were together with Louis Kentner in a 1941 Columbia Records account of the Dvořák Dumky Trio, and again with Solomon in the Beethoven Archduke Trio in 1943. The Philharmonia Quartet was performing at Manchester in 1945 (the year in which Holst began teaching at the Royal College of Music). It gave the premiere of the William Walton A minor Quartet at the Prague Spring Festival in 1947, and thereafter repeated it at home (e.g. Aberdeen Chamber Society, February 1948). Its performance in the Brahms F minor Quintet with Clifford Curzon was considered 'exhilarating'. Its 1945 Columbia Records 78 rpm recording of the Mozart clarinet quintet with Reginald Kell (the earlier of Kell's versions) was highly praised. Columbia recording 78 rpm Beethoven Quartet op.59 n°1 members Holst-Wise-Riddle-Pini.

== Recordings ==
(Columbia Records, 78 rpm)

- Mozart: Clarinet Quintet, with Reginald Kell (DX 1187–90). (5.2.45)
- Mozart: Quartet in C major K 465 (DX 1524–1526). (11.6.46)
- Mozart: Quartet in B flat major K 458 (DX 1025–1027). (7.8.41)
- Schubert: Quartet in D minor 'Death and the Maiden'. (DX 1089–1092) (29.7.42)
- Schubert: Quartet in A minor op 29 (DX 1349–52). (18.12.46)
- Beethoven: Quartet op 59 no 1 (DX 1067–71). (5.1.42)
- (more)

== Sources ==
- C. Fifield, Ibbs and Tillett, The Rise and Fall of a Musical Empire (Ashgate Publishing, 2005).
- T. Potter, Herbert Downes - Obituary, The Guardian, 26 January 2005.
- E. Sackville-West and D. Shawe-Taylor, The Record Year 2 (Collins, London 1953).
- Aberdeen chamber concert 1 Feb 1948
