= Ernest Element =

British musician

Ernest Element (5 January 1909 - 12 October 1990) was a British violinist and string quartet leader.

== Career ==
=== Early education ===
Ernest Element was born in Wolverhampton and educated at Ocker Hill School, Dudley. He studied at Birmingham School of Music with Arthur Hytch and later with Paul Beard, Henry Holst and Carl Flesch, he was awarded the Carl Flesch prize. He tutored many pupils including Howard Davis who led the Alberni String Quartet.

=== Orchestral involvement ===
He played the Elgar Violin Concerto in the old BSM buildings to Elgar himself.

With Herbert Downes he played Bach's Concerto for Two Violins in D minor at the Students' Twenty-Eighth Annual Orchestral and Vocal Concert in Birmingham Town Hall on Wednesday 12 June 1929.

He was deputy leader of the BBC Midland Orchestra and was offered the deputy leadership of the London Philharmonic Orchestra under Sir Thomas Beecham. He declined and became leader of the second violins.

For nine years he was a member of the Philharmonia String Quartet with Henry Holst, Herbert Downes and Anthony Pini. The Quartet recorded, travelled frequently and were the first musicians to venture behind the Iron Curtain after the war, playing in the British Embassy in Prague in 1947. William Walton accompanied them.

Musicians from the BBC Midland Orchestra were posted to regional orchestras after the outbreak of war and he was moved to Manchester and played with the BBC Northern and Halle Orchestras; he also joined the Laurance Turner quartet.

In 1928 he joined the City of Birmingham Orchestra under Dr Adrian Boult, as No.3 in the second violins. When Boult was invited to go to London to found the BBC Symphony Orchestra in 1930, the new man at the helm of the CBO, Leslie Heward, promoted Ernest to Deputy Leader, to sit alongside Paul Beard. He remained there until he left in 1940 on his move to Manchester. George Weldon persuaded him to re-join the CBO in 1944 when it went full-time towards the end of the World War II. He stayed until March 1946 when ever-increasing demands were made on him for teaching and quartet playing.

He was a chamber music player of international status, playing with such artists as Schnabel, Szigetti, Pierre Fournier and William Primrose and deputising for the Amadeus. As leader of the Element Quartet, he gave many broadcasts on BBC radio and recordings on EMI. In the late 1950s Ernest spent a lot of time with the Quartet playing live on BBC radio, sometimes weekly.

He joined the staff of Birmingham School of Music in 1947, and became principal string teacher in 1970 and co-director of the chamber music department with Frank Downes. His association with BSM lasted for over fifty-five years.

In 1947 he assembled as part of a group to perform in England and on the continent with violinist Joseph Szigeti, cellist Pierre Fournier, violist William Primrose and bassist James Merrett. The first programs were given in Edinburgh, followed by a Brahms-Schubert festival in London; all of these concerts were broadcast throughout Europe by the several national radio networks.

In 1953, he and Dorothy Hemming performed the Bach Double Concerto at the London Promenade Concerts (the Proms) under the baton of Adrian Boult and also in Birmingham Town Hall as part of the Birmingham Proms. Ernest had a close association with composer Robert Simpson, whose First Violin Concerto was dedicated to him and which he premièred in Birmingham Town Hall in 1960. The dedication of the new concerto runs: "To Ernest Element—profound artist and irreplaceable friend." Simpson also dedicated his first three String Quartets to him and the Element Quartet. Among the many conductors he played under were Sir Henry Wood, Sir Edward Elgar, Sir Thomas Beecham, Felix Weingartner, Bruno Water, Herbert von Karajan, Sir Adrian Boult, Sir Malcolm Sargent, Leslie Heward and Harold Gray.

Ernest Element was awarded a Birmingham School of Music Honorary Fellowship in 1979.

=== Death and commemoration ===
He died in Bournemouth on 12 October 1990 The violinist Herbert Downes wrote in The Guardian on 12 November 1990:

"The violinist Ernest Element was a first-class fiddler who rarely settled for less.... Eventually he formed his own Quartert in Birmingham, the 'Element' and they had great success. He still could have had an orchestral leaders job, but refused several tempting offers in order to concentrate on chamber music. Who could blame him? After all, the repertoire is incomparable."

Robert Simpson wrote:

All musicians who worked with Ernest Element agree that he was a great artist.... But most of all I remember what this man showed me without effort – the supreme value of selflessness in art. This is what made him great".
