= Testore =

Testore is an Italian surname.

Among the most famous Testore was a family of violin makers, active from the late seventeenth to the end of the eighteenth century in Milan. Their reputation at the time was not high, as their instruments were known for being made quickly and using average materials, but they are more highly esteemed today. Their works often feature the emblem of an eagle (Al segno dell'Aquila).

- Carlo Giuseppe Testore (1665–1716), Milanese luthier and father of Carlo Antonio and Paolo Antonio
- Carlo Antonio Testore (1693–1765), Milanese luthier and son of Carlo Giuseppe
- Paolo Antonio Testore (c.1690–c.1760), Milanese luthier and son of Carlo Giuseppe
- Pietro Testore (1732–c. 1800), Milanese luthier, son of Paolo Antonio
