= Grancino =

Grancino is the surname of the following people from Milan:

- Andrea Grancino (1626–1698), Italian violin maker
- Gianbattista Grancino (also Giovanni Battista Grancino; 1673–c. 1730), Italian violin maker
- Giovanni Battista Grancino (1637–1709), Italian violin maker
- Francesco Grancino, Italian violin maker (brother of Giovanni Battista Grancino; same name as their grandfather)
- Michelangelo Grancini (sometimes Grancino, of Milan), (c. 1605–1669), Italian organist, conductor, and composer
- Paolo Grancino (1655–after 1692), Italian violin maker
