= Gianbattista Grancino =

Milanese luthier (1673 - c.1730)

Gianbattista Grancino or Giovanni Battista Grancino (born c. 1673 – died ca.1730) was a member of the family of luthiers Grancino (in German). Other members included Giovanni Grancino, Andrea Grancino, Francesco Grancino and Paolo Grancino.

Their instruments were played by Yehudi Menuhin (violin), Donald Hazelwood (violin), Ladislav Černý (viola), Siegfried Palm (cello) and Adrian Beers (double bass), among others.

== See also ==
- Grancino
- Giovanni Grancino
- Paolo Grancino
