= Anthony Pini =

Argentinian-born cellist (1902 - 1989)

Carlos Antonio Pini OBE (15 April 1902 – 1 January 1989) was a cellist, known as a soloist, orchestral section leader and chamber musician. He was principal cellist of five major British orchestras between 1932 and 1976, and a teacher at the Royal College of Music and the Guildhall School of Music and Drama.

== Life and career ==
Pini was born in Buenos Aires, Argentina, the son of a Scottish mother and an Argentine father. The family was musical; Pini's younger brother Eugene achieved success as the leader of a tango band popular in the 1930s and 1940s. When Pini was ten he moved with his mother to Glasgow. He was educated there, and then joined a local orchestra, playing under Landon Ronald. He moved to London, playing in the Queen's Hall Light Orchestra. In 1926 he made the first of many broadcasts for the BBC, in Mozart's String Quartet, K 458.

In 1932 Sir Thomas Beecham invited Pini to lead the cello section of his new London Philharmonic Orchestra. In 1939 Pini moved to the BBC Symphony Orchestra and in 1943 he joined the Liverpool Philharmonic Orchestra. When Beecham set up the Royal Philharmonic Orchestra in 1947 he again invited Pini to be his principal cellist. Pini remained in the position for the rest of Beecham's life. In 1953 he was selected by Sir Adrian Boult to play in the orchestra for the Coronation of Elizabeth II. In 1964 he took his final orchestral post, leading the cellos in the orchestra of the Royal Opera House, Covent Garden, retiring in 1976.

Pini was a member of several chamber ensembles during his career, including the Brosa and Philharmonia string quartets. Grove's Dictionary of Music and Musicians rates the Philharmonia recordings of Schubert's Death and the Maiden and Mozart's Hunt quartets as classics, and similarly rates Pini's recordings of Elgar's Cello Concerto (with the London Philharmonic and Eduard van Beinum) and Beethoven's Archduke Trio with Solomon and Henry Holst.

In later years Pini taught at the Royal College of Music and the Guildhall School of Music and Drama, where, in the words of The Times, "he passed on the classical virtues of his discreet but distinct style". His own instrument was a Grancino cello of 1696.

Pini was awarded the OBE in 1976. His son Carl became a well-known violinist, and led the New Philharmonia Orchestra in the 1970s.

Pini died at the age of 86 on New Year's Day 1989, in Barcombe, East Sussex.
