= Philharmonia Orchestra =

Orchestra based in London

- Orchestra
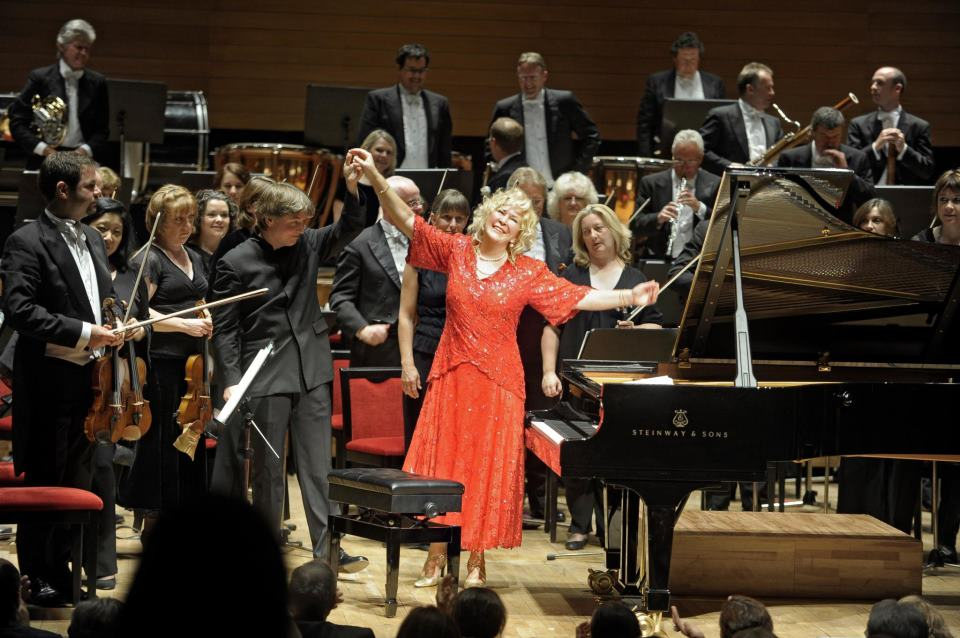
- Philharmonia Orchestra, Esa-Pekka Salonen, Gülsin Onay, 2011
- Founded: 1945
- Location: London
- Concert hall: Royal Festival Hall
- Principal conductor: Santtu-Matias Rouvali
- Website: philharmonia.co.uk

The Philharmonia Orchestra is a British orchestra based in London. It was founded in 1945 by Walter Legge, a classical music record producer for EMI. Among the conductors who worked with the orchestra in its early years were Richard Strauss, Wilhelm Furtwängler and Arturo Toscanini; of the Philharmonia's younger conductors, the most important to its development was Herbert von Karajan who, though never formally chief conductor, was closely associated with the orchestra in the late 1940s and early 1950s. The Philharmonia became widely regarded as the finest of London's five symphony orchestras in its first two decades.

From the late 1950s to the early 1970s, the orchestra's chief conductor was Otto Klemperer, with whom the orchestra gave many concerts and made numerous recordings of the core orchestral repertoire. During Klemperer's tenure, Legge attempted to disband the orchestra in 1964, citing the difficulty of maintaining the orchestra's high standards. However, the players, backed by Klemperer, formed themselves into a self-governing ensemble as the New Philharmonia Orchestra. After thirteen years under this title, they negotiated the rights to revert to the original name.

In Klemperer's last years, the orchestra suffered a decline, both financial and artistic, but recovered under his successor, Riccardo Muti, who revitalised the orchestra in his ten-year term from 1972 to 1982. The orchestra's standards remained high throughout the controversial chief conductorship of Giuseppe Sinopoli from 1984 to 1994, and the more orthodox tenure of Christoph von Dohnányi between 1997 and 2008. Esa-Pekka Salonen was principal conductor from 2008 to 2021. Santtu-Matias Rouvali became principal conductor in 2021.

The Philharmonia has had many celebrated players in its ranks and has commissioned more than 100 compositions. It gives more than 160 concerts a year, tours widely, and from its inception has been known for its many recordings.

== History ==
=== Background ===
The name "Philharmonia" was adopted by the impresario and recording producer Walter Legge for a string quartet he brought together in 1941, comprising Henry Holst, Jean Pougnet, Frederick Riddle and Anthony Pini. The name was taken from the title page of the published score Legge used for the first work they recorded. (Note: The work was Mozart's Quartet no. 17 in B flat, K 458: The Hunt, published in the Philharmonia Pocket Scores series. The recording was issued on EMI's Columbia label.) Temporarily augmented to a septet, the ensemble gave its first concert in the Wigmore Hall, the main item being Ravel's Introduction and Allegro. With several changes of personnel the quartet continued to play in concert and in the recording studio during the Second World War. In 1942 the editor of The Gramophone, Compton Mackenzie, wrote that he had no hesitation in calling the Philharmonia the best string quartet in the country.

During the war, Legge was in charge of the music division of the Entertainments National Service Association (ENSA), which provided entertainment for British and allied armed forces. In this role he was in close touch with many first-rate musicians in the armed services, from whom he intended to draw when creating a new orchestra after the end of the war. He later set out his guiding principles:

- There are enough first-class musicians in Britain to make one orchestra at least equal and in certain sections, superior, to the best European orchestras. All these players must be in one orchestra – the Philharmonia.
- I would make an orchestra of such quality that the best instrumentalists would compete for privilege of playing in it.
- No "passengers". One inferior player can mar an orchestra's ensemble and intonation.
- An orchestra consisting only of artists distinguished in their own right can give its best only with the best conductors.
- No permanent conductor. An orchestra working with only one conductor, no matter how gifted he may be, inevitably bears the mark of its permanent conductor's personality, his own particular sonority and his approach to music. The Philharmonia Orchestra must have style, not a style.

Before the war, Legge had been assistant to Sir Thomas Beecham at the Royal Opera House, Covent Garden. Both men wrongly assumed that they would be able to resume their control of the opera house after the war, and Legge conceived of a new orchestra based there, operating on the lines of the Vienna Philharmonic – playing in the pit for the opera and also giving concerts and making records on its own account. The committee appointed by the British government to re-establish opera and ballet at Covent Garden abandoned the pre-war system of opera seasons, in favour of a permanent year-round company. Neither Beecham nor Legge was invited to run it. Legge nevertheless decided to go ahead with his plans to form an orchestra. Although London already had three permanent symphony orchestras – the London Symphony Orchestra (LSO), BBC Symphony Orchestra (BBC SO) and London Philharmonic (LPO), their personnel and standards had declined during the war and he was convinced he could do better.

=== First concerts ===
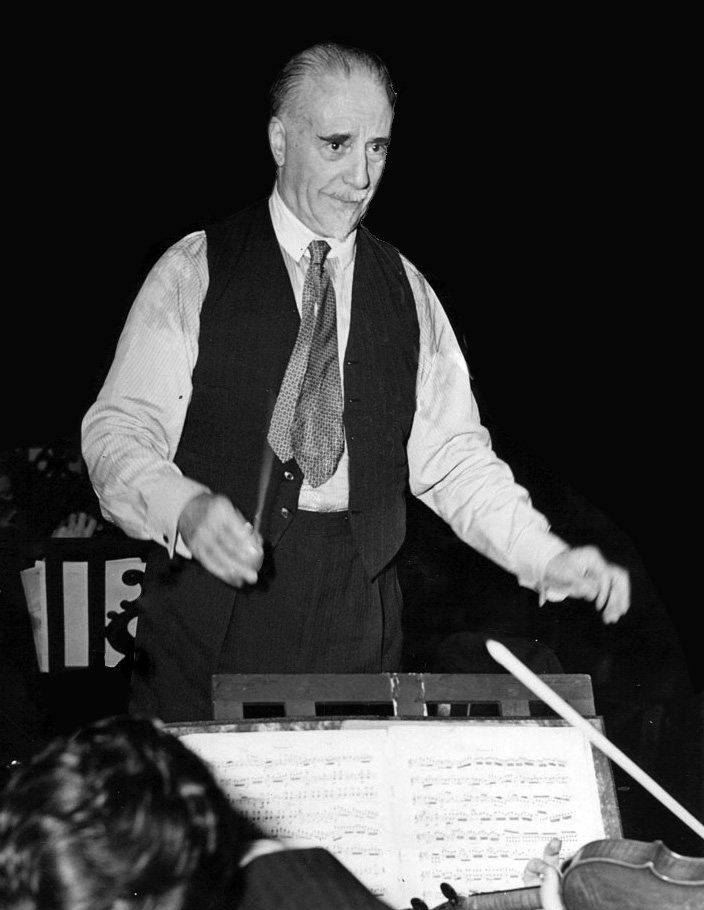
Sir Thomas Beecham, conductor of the Philharmonia's first concert in 1945 (image from 1948)

Legge secured the services of many talented young musicians still serving in the armed forces. He first assembled a "Philharmonia String Orchestra" for recordings in 1945, composed of musicians from the RAF orchestra. He then recruited wind and percussion players, including some of the country's top instrumentalists who had been playing in other orchestras during the war. At the Philharmonia Orchestra's first concert, on 27 October 1945, more than sixty per cent of the players were still officially in the services. Beecham conducted the concert (for the fee of one cigar), but as he refused to be Legge's employee and Legge refused to cede control of the orchestra, they went their separate ways. Beecham founded the Royal Philharmonic Orchestra (RPO) the following year.

Unlike the existing London orchestras, but like Beecham's Royal Philharmonic, the early Philharmonia was not a permanent ensemble: it was convened ad hoc from available players on Legge's list. Several of those players were also on Beecham's list, and were able to play for both orchestras, including the horn player, Dennis Brain, the clarinettist Reginald Kell and the timpanist James Bradshaw. Although this gave both orchestras access to the finest players, a review of the London orchestral scene of the late 1940s commented, "The Philharmonia and Royal Philharmonic share a very serious disability: that neither is a permanently constituted orchestra. Both assemble and disperse more or less at random ... there is no style which is distinctively RPO or Philharmonia." It was widely felt in musical circles that the Philharmonia was essentially a recording orchestra that also gave concerts, although Legge firmly denied this. (Note: As late as 2001 the Grove Dictionary of Music and Musicians described the early Philharmonia as "primarily an EMI recording orchestra".) Nevertheless, the orchestra played far fewer concerts than the older London orchestras: in 1949–50 the Philharmonia gave 32 concerts compared with 55 by the BBC SO, 103 by the LSO, and 248 by the LPO.

From its early years the orchestra played under prominent conductors including Richard Strauss for a single concert in 1947, and from 1948 onwards, Wilhelm Furtwängler and Herbert von Karajan for concerts and recordings. Until the opening of the Royal Festival Hall in 1951, London lacked a suitable hall for symphony concerts. (Note: The Queen's Hall, regarded as an excellent concert venue, had been destroyed by bombing during the war.) Filling the vast Royal Albert Hall was difficult, except for such sell-out performances as Strauss's concert, a cycle of the Beethoven piano concertos with Artur Schnabel as soloist (1946), or the world premiere of Strauss's Four Last Songs with Kirsten Flagstad as soloist and Furtwängler conducting (1950). For other, less popular, concerts in the orchestra's early years Legge was partly dependent on financial support from a musical benefactor, the last Maharaja of Mysore.

=== 1950s: Karajan and Toscanini ===
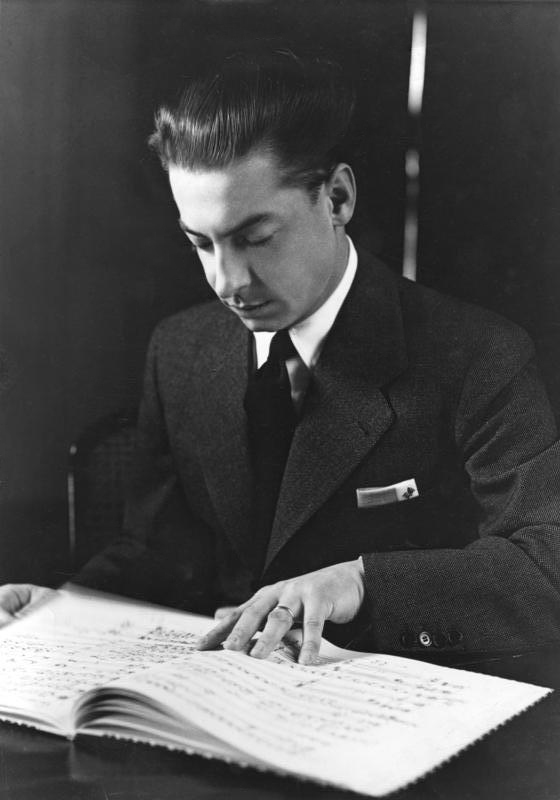
Herbert von Karajan (1938 photograph)

By the early 1950s the conductor most associated with the orchestra was Karajan, although he was not, officially or even unofficially, its chief conductor. He chose to work mainly with the Philharmonia and came to London for long spells twice or three times a year giving concerts and making recordings. Legge's practice of tying concerts in with studio recordings ensured longer than usual rehearsal time, paid for by EMI. (Note: A typical example occurred in late 1956, when Legge scheduled three Brahms symphonies for recording by Klemperer and the Philharmonia days before their live performances of the same works at the Festival Hall, ensuring that EMI would effectively subsidise the rehearsals for the concerts.) In the early years, Karajan's concerts were criticised in the press for their unadventurous programming; (Note: The music critic of The Times called it "a virtuoso conductor's procession of chevaux de bataille".) but a financially hazardous tour of Europe in 1952 necessitated programmes that were box-office attractions. Karajan told the orchestra that he felt it his duty to show Europe "the exceptional qualities of tone, aristocracy and vitality" of the Philharmonia's playing. The violinist Joseph Szigeti commented that the Philharmonia "showed the Continent for the first time all the qualities of perfect chamber-music playing raised to the power of a great symphony orchestra."

While the orchestra was in Italy it so impressed Arturo Toscanini that he offered to come to London to conduct it. His two concerts at the Festival Hall in September 1952 (the four symphonies of Brahms) were a critical and commercial success. In the same year, Furtwängler conducted the orchestra and soloists headed by Flagstad in a recording of Tristan und Isolde that has remained in the catalogues ever since. Legge realised that Furtwängler was in declining health and that sooner or later Karajan would succeed him as chief conductor of the Berlin Philharmonic and Salzburg Festival and be lost to the Philharmonia. Legge began to seek out suitable successors.

=== 1950s: Karajan to Klemperer ===
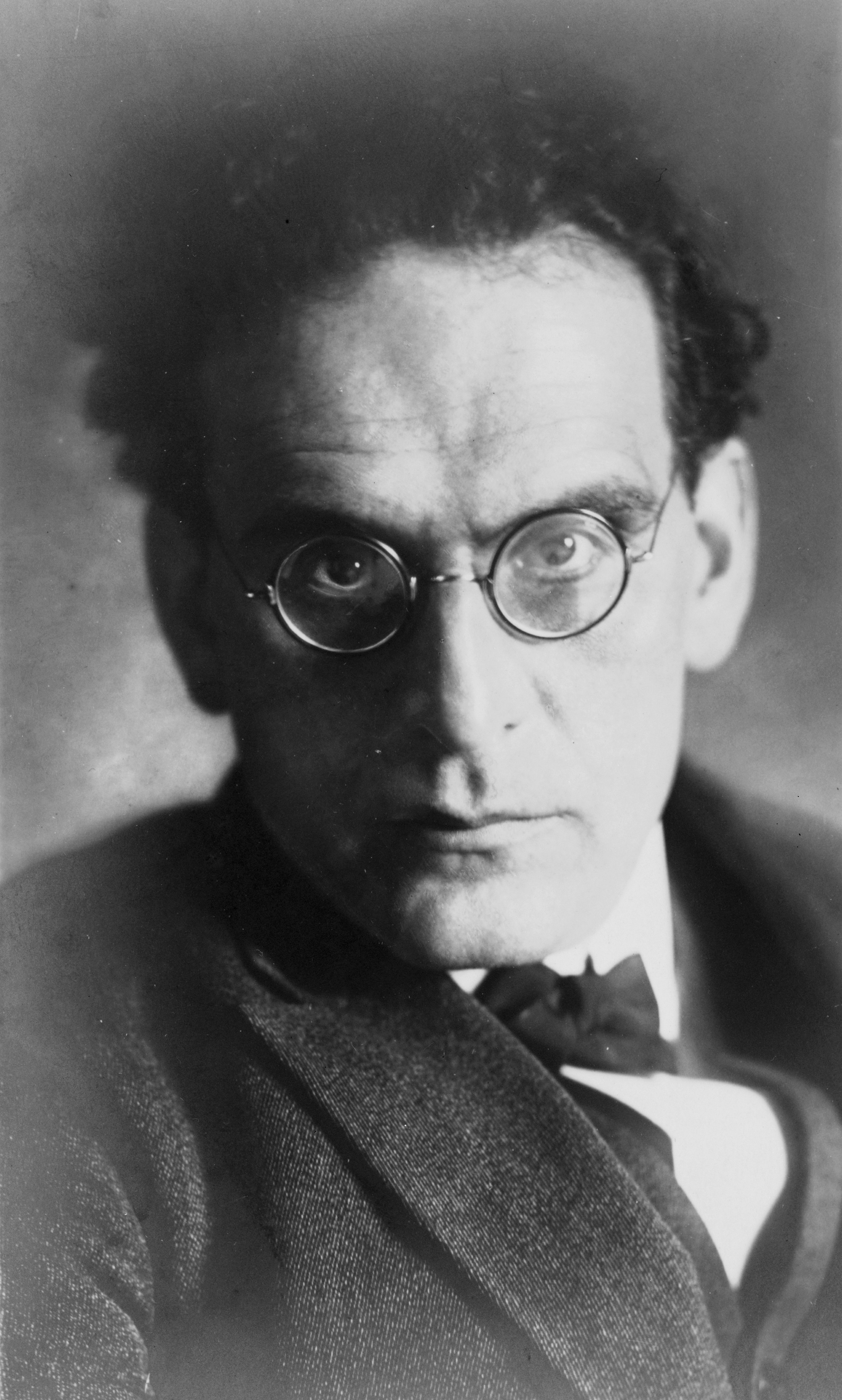
Otto Klemperer, first principal conductor of the Philharmonia

As Legge had expected, Karajan succeeded to the Berlin and Salzburg positions after Furtwängler died in 1954. (Note: It was generally seen as a foregone conclusion that Karajan would succeed Furtwängler, although protracted contractual negotiations meant that Karajan did not formally take over until April 1956.) Karajan remained under contract to EMI, but he quickly reduced his commitments to the Philharmonia. Among alternatives favoured by Legge and the orchestra was Guido Cantelli, who conducted some well-received recordings and concerts; his death in a plane crash in 1956 at the age of thirty-six deprived the Philharmonia of a potential replacement for Karajan. Another of Legge's protégés, Carlo Maria Giulini, seemed promising, but had not at that point established himself with the orchestra or the public, and had a restricted repertory. Legge gradually built up a strong relationship with the veteran Otto Klemperer, who was admired by the players, the critics and the public.

The year after Cantelli's death, the orchestra suffered a still worse blow with the death in a car crash of Dennis Brain, not only a supremely gifted player, but the most popular member of the orchestra among his colleagues. He was succeeded as principal horn by his deputy, Alan Civil.

In 1957, Legge launched the Philharmonia Chorus, an amateur body with a stiffening of professionals when needed. The chorus made its debut in Beethoven's Choral Symphony conducted by Klemperer, and won extremely favourable reviews. In The Observer Peter Heyworth wrote that with so fine a choir and "our best orchestra" and a great conductor, Legge had given London "a Beethoven cycle that any city in the world, be it Vienna or New York, would envy". In 1959 Legge abandoned his policy that the orchestra should have no permanent conductor, and appointed Klemperer "conductor-for-life".

=== 1960–1964 ===
In the early 1960s, the Philharmonia continued to be widely regarded as London's best orchestra. The RPO went through difficult times after Beecham's death in 1961; neither the BBC SO or the LPO had yet regained its pre-war excellence; and the LSO was only in the early stages of its return to eminence. The Philharmonia entered into a new three-year contract with EMI on advantageous terms in 1960; the number of players applying to join the orchestra was increasing; its records sold well; and its concerts under Klemperer, Giulini, Sir John Barbirolli and others (occasionally including Karajan, who made his last appearance with the orchestra in 1960) were well received by the public and the critics. Unknown to the public, and to a considerable extent the players, a combination of factors beyond the orchestra's control was leading to a crisis. First, to avoid clashes of repertoire the Festival Hall management set up a committee to co-ordinate programming by the London orchestras. Secondly, at EMI a similar rationalisation was taking place, with an internal committee deciding which works producers, including Legge, could schedule. Legge, an autocrat by temperament, resented any curtailment of his personal control, and found committees intolerable. Finance also started to become a problem. The Philharmonia's lucrative recording contract depended on regular work in the studio, and having by now recorded most of the standard repertoire first in mono and again in stereo the orchestra's prospects for recording were diminishing. This meant that Legge's scope for having concert rehearsals subsidised by EMI was also shrinking.

Although few agreed with him, Legge contended that the quality of the orchestra was declining. Looking back in 1975 at the heyday of his orchestra, he singled out for particular mention not only Brain and Civil, Kell and Bradshaw, but also Clement Lawton (tuba), Arthur Gleghorn (piccolo), Gareth Morris (flute), Sidney Sutcliffe (oboe), Frederick Thurston and Bernard Walton (clarinets), Gwydion Brooke (bassoon), and two leaders, Manoug Parikian and Hugh Bean. Legge maintained retrospectively that in the absence of enough recording work to attract the finest new orchestral players to follow such stars he had no alternative to disbanding the Philharmonia.

In March 1964, with no advance warning to the orchestra, Legge issued a press statement announcing that "after the fulfilment of its present commitments the activities of the Philharmonia Orchestra will be suspended for an indefinite period." The historian of the orchestra Stephen Pettitt comments, "If Legge thought that by suspending the Philharmonia Orchestra he was killing it, he had reckoned without the players". They formed themselves into a self-governing company, led by Bernard Walton, the principal clarinet, and adopted the name New Philharmonia Orchestra (NPO). Hitherto, the players had been technically freelance, paid by Legge for each performance, but they now became employees of the company they collectively owned, with security of employment. (Note: By 1964 this was the norm for the London orchestras other than the BBC SO. The LSO had been a self-governing co-operative from its inception in 1904; the LPO, originally privately owned by Beecham, reorganised itself on similar lines in 1940; and the RPO, similarly Beecham's private domain, formed itself into a self-governing ensemble in 1963, two years after his death.)

Klemperer, Giulini and Barbirolli gave the new orchestra their strong backing, as did Sir Adrian Boult, who incensed Legge by addressing the audience at a Philharmonia concert a few days later: "Do you want to see this great orchestra snuffed out like a candle? It must not be allowed to die!" He urged the public to support the orchestra by going to all its concerts, whatever the programmes. The music critic of The Times commented that Boult's point was underlined by "the resplendent, intense sound he drew from choir and orchestra during the concert."

=== 1964–1977: New Philharmonia ===
In its early years as an independent body, the New Philharmonia flourished, in the concert hall and the recording studio. As well as its existing regular conductors, the orchestra worked with Ernest Ansermet, Pierre Boulez, Benjamin Britten and James Levine and many others. It reciprocated Klemperer's loyalty and appointed him its president and chief conductor, but this led to a decline in orchestral discipline and standards as Klemperer grew older, frailer and less in command. Giulini became disillusioned and began to distance himself; Barbirolli remained firmly loyal until his death in 1970. Klemperer's decline led to a diminution in recording sessions, and the orchestra's finances became difficult by the late 1960s and early 1970s. There were serious but inconclusive discussions about a merger with the LPO, which was also in some difficulties at the time. The NPO was rescued from financial disaster by two musical philanthropists, one anonymous and the other Ian Stoutzker, a prominent banker, who offered either to buy the orchestra outright or, as occurred, to underwrite its finances.

Leading players of the early 1970s included Raymond Cohen, Desmond Bradley, Carlos Villa (violins), Herbert Downes (viola), Gareth Morris (flute), John McCaw (clarinet), Gwydion Brooke (bassoon) and Nicholas Busch (horn). The Philharmonia was ahead of some of its London rivals in admitting female players. (Note: The RPO did not admit women until after Beecham's death; the LSO elected its first woman member in 1975.) By 1972, seventeen of the sixty-six string players were women, although the other three sections remained exclusively male, except for the veteran harpist, Sidonie Goossens.

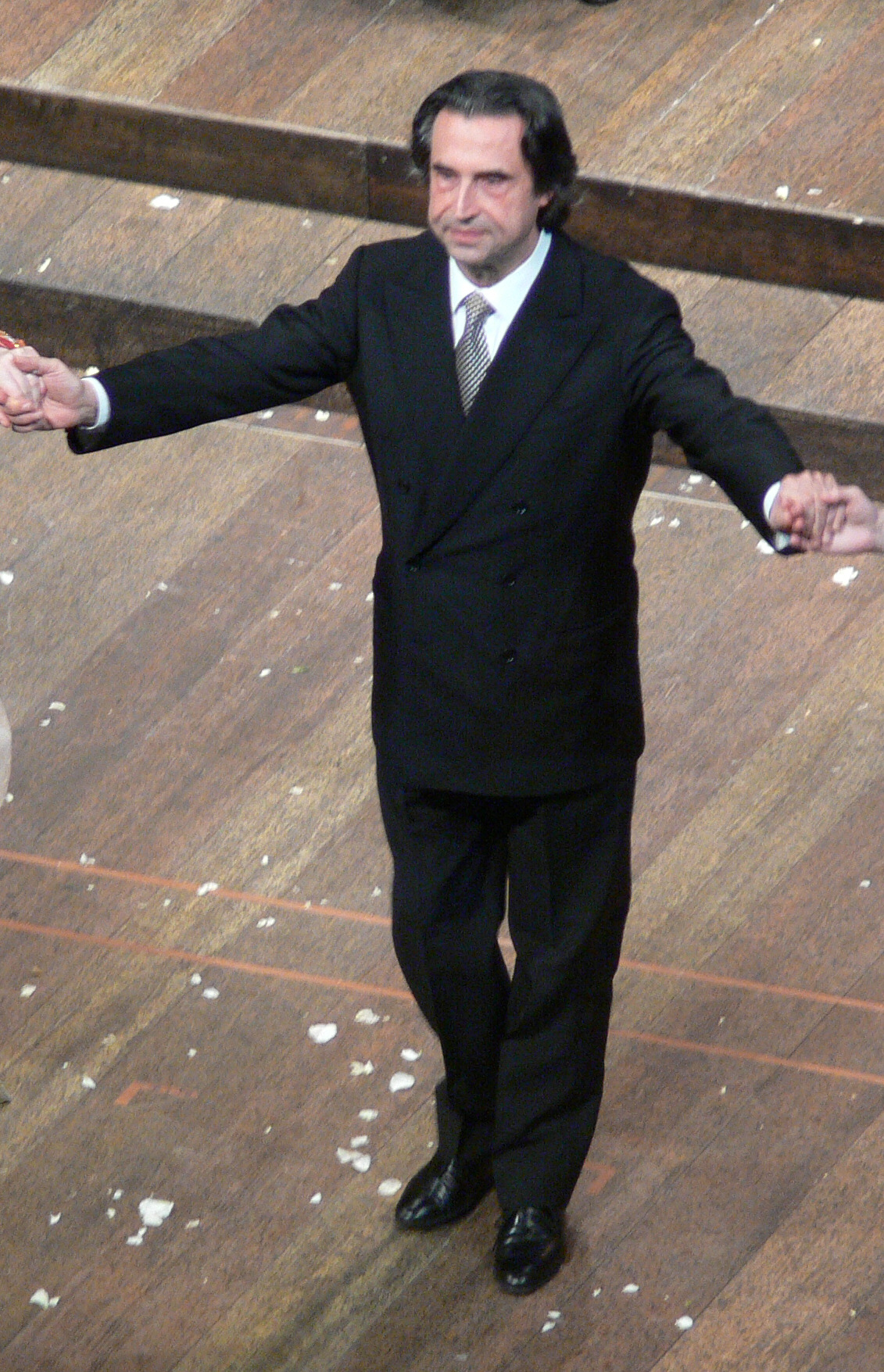
Riccardo Muti (2008 photograph), chief conductor from 1972 to 1982

In Klemperer's later years, the orchestra appointed Lorin Maazel, nominally as "associate principal conductor", from 1970, although in practice his role was more like a chief conductorship, with Klemperer as a figurehead, albeit one still capable of inspiring magnificent performances on occasion. Maazel sought more control than the self-governing orchestra was willing to concede, and resigned from his post in early 1972, although he continued to accept invitations to conduct the orchestra. Shortly afterwards, Klemperer announced his retirement; he died, aged 88, the following year. The orchestra recognised that a strong chief conductor was needed to restore its standards and finances, but there was no immediately obvious candidate. Although Legge no longer had any stake in the orchestra he watched its progress benevolently, and having spotted the potential of Riccardo Muti he recommended him to the New Philharmonia's general manager, Terence McDonald. Other potential candidates were considered, but Muti was appointed as the orchestra's chief conductor from 1973.

Muti, although he disclaimed such a description, was a firm disciplinarian, and under his conductorship the orchestra restored its standards. Richard Morrison later wrote in The Times that in his ten years in charge, Muti turned a struggling orchestra into "a great ensemble". Critics at the time commented on the orchestra's "superb performance", "immense virtuosity", its "astoundingly delicate" string playing and "woodwind phrasing even more magical than their Berlin colleagues". Muti was under contract to EMI, which brought the orchestra much valuable studio work. With Muti the orchestra recorded opera (Aida, 1974; Un ballo in maschera, 1975; Nabucco, 1977; I puritani, 1979; Cavalleria rusticana, 1979; La traviata, 1980; Orfeo ed Euridice, 1981; and Don Pasquale, 1982); a wide range of the symphonic repertoire including Schumann and Tchaikovsky cycles; concertos with soloists including Sviatoslav Richter, Andrei Gavrilov, Anne-Sophie Mutter and Gidon Kremer; and choral music by Cherubini and Vivaldi. After Legge's departure the orchestra was no longer exclusively tied to EMI, and made more than seventy recordings for Decca, starting in December 1964. Later Decca sessions were conducted by Boult, Britten, Giulini, Maazel, Claudio Abbado, Vladimir Ashkenazy, Charles Munch, Leopold Stokowski, and in 1967 Christoph von Dohnányi, who three decades later became the orchestra's chief conductor. (Note: Dohnányi conducted a work by his grandfather, Ernst von Dohnányi, the Variations on a Nursery Song, Op. 25, with Earl Wild as the piano soloist.)

During Muti's tenure, the orchestra recovered its original title, after prolonged and complex negotiations. From September 1977 the "New" was dropped, and the orchestra has been the Philharmonia since then. Walter Legge died in 1979, and the orchestra dedicated a Tchaikovsky symphony cycle at the Festival Hall to his memory; reviewing one of the concerts in The Guardian, Edward Greenfield commented that Muti had brought the orchestra's playing "within reach of that earlier peerless example".

=== Late 20th century ===
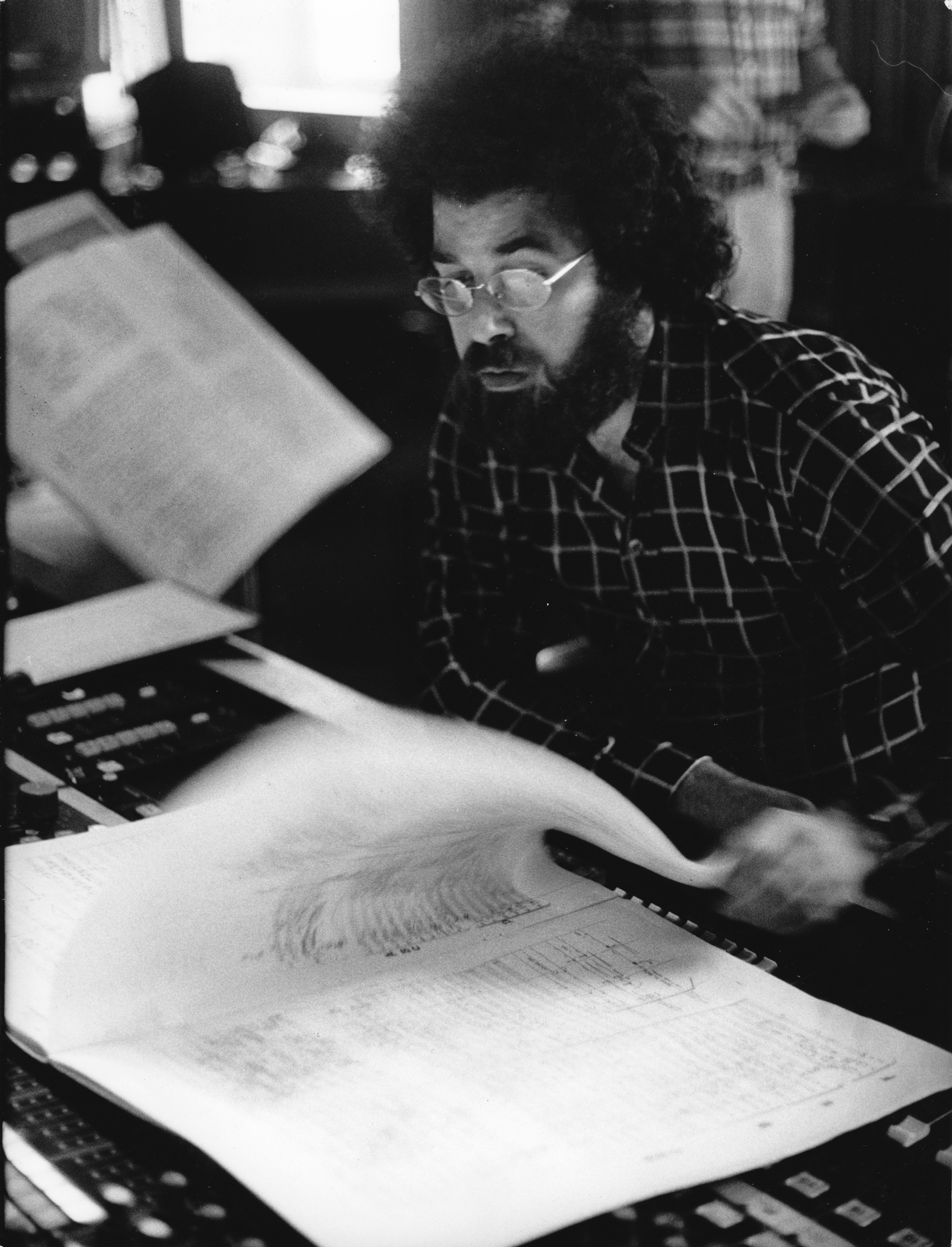
Giuseppe Sinopoli, chief conductor from 1984 to 1994

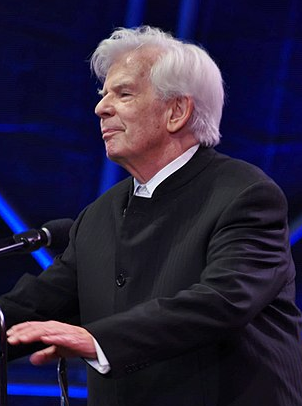
Christoph von Dohnányi, chief conductor from 1997 to 2008

Leading members of the orchestra in the later years of Muti's tenure included Raymond Ovens (leader), Gordon Hunt (oboe), Adrian Leaper (horn), John Wallace (trumpet) and David Corkhill (percussion). Clement Relf, singled out for praise by Legge in his memoirs, remained the orchestral librarian as he had been since 1945. In 1980 the orchestra received royal recognition when the Prince of Wales accepted an invitation to be the Philharmonia's honorary patron.

Muti stepped down as chief conductor in 1982. Giuseppe Sinopoli succeeded him in 1984 and, like Muti, served for ten years. Although the orchestra's standards remained high during Sinopoli's tenure, the conductor had what David Nice described in The Guardian as "a love-hate relationship" with the public and critics, because of his "slow speeds and mannered, sometimes lifeless phrasing". The same writer continues that the Philharmonia players did not take to "Sinopoli's peculiarly Italian brand of intellectualism; London musicians never like too much talk, let alone an analytic seminar on the work in question". By 1990 it was far from certain that Sinopoli's appointment would last until 1994 as scheduled, but he brought to the orchestra a lucrative recording contract with Deutsche Grammophon and tours to countries including Japan and Germany where the conductor was held in very much higher regard than in Britain. Although Sinopoli's Philharmonia performances of works such as Elgar's Second Symphony attracted much disparaging criticism, he was felt to be more successful in opera. Nice comments that the Philharmonia players "lent an unprecedented degree of tonal beauty" to their opera recordings with Sinopoli; they included Manon Lescaut, 1983; La forza del destino, 1985; Madama Butterfly, 1987; Cavalleria rusticana, 1990; and Tosca, 1992.

In 1995, the orchestra celebrated its 50th anniversary and launched its UK and international residency programme, with residencies at the Southbank Centre, London, and the Corn Exchange, Bedford. The orchestra developed further long-term partnerships, beginning with De Montfort Hall in Leicester (from 1997). Further partnerships followed in later decades.

It was three years before the Philharmonia recruited a chief conductor to replace Sinopoli: Christoph von Dohnányi took up the position in 1997. The music critic Andrew Clements commented that the Philharmonia's players had "maintained their coherence remarkably well through the long interregnum", but that securing "a conductor of Dohnányi's pedigree" was a major achievement, and that the conductor's skill as an orchestral trainer, combined with his excellence in interpretation augured well for the orchestra's future. Dohnányi's conducting was regarded as reliable and musically admirable, although sometimes rather cool. His commitment to modern music influenced the orchestra's programming and won approval from the press. With Dohnányi the Philharmonia played in Vienna, Salzburg, Amsterdam, Lucerne and Paris. For several seasons they were in residence at the Théâtre du Châtelet, where they took part in new productions of six operas: Arabella, Die Frau ohne Schatten, Die schweigsame Frau, Moses und Aron, Oedipus Rex and Hänsel und Gretel.

In 1999, the orchestra took part in what was described as a "fly-on-the-wall" television documentary, giving the public glimpses of day-to-day orchestral life. It showed the efforts to which individual players went to secure sponsorship for the orchestra, and the heavy workload they sustained. In 2000, under the direction of Gilbert Levine, the Philharmonia Orchestra and Chorus performed Haydn's The Creation in a series of concerts in Baltimore, London, and Rome, including televised concerts in Baltimore and at the Vatican, as part of the "Millennium Creation Series"

=== 21st century ===
In a 2006 survey of British orchestras, Morrison described the current Philharmonia as "a serious, high-quality orchestra". He praised its "astute and canny" management, and commented that the orchestra had a large, loyal following in London, and had gained additional support elsewhere in Britain by extending its touring programme while the Festival Hall was closed for renovation between 2005 and 2007. Since 2000 the orchestra has established further residencies: at The Anvil, Basingstoke (from 2001), the Marlowe Theatre, Canterbury and the Three Choirs Festival. Dohnányi's final tour with the orchestra as chief conductor was of the US, where they gave concerts in Miami, Los Angeles, San Francisco and Costa Mesa, California.

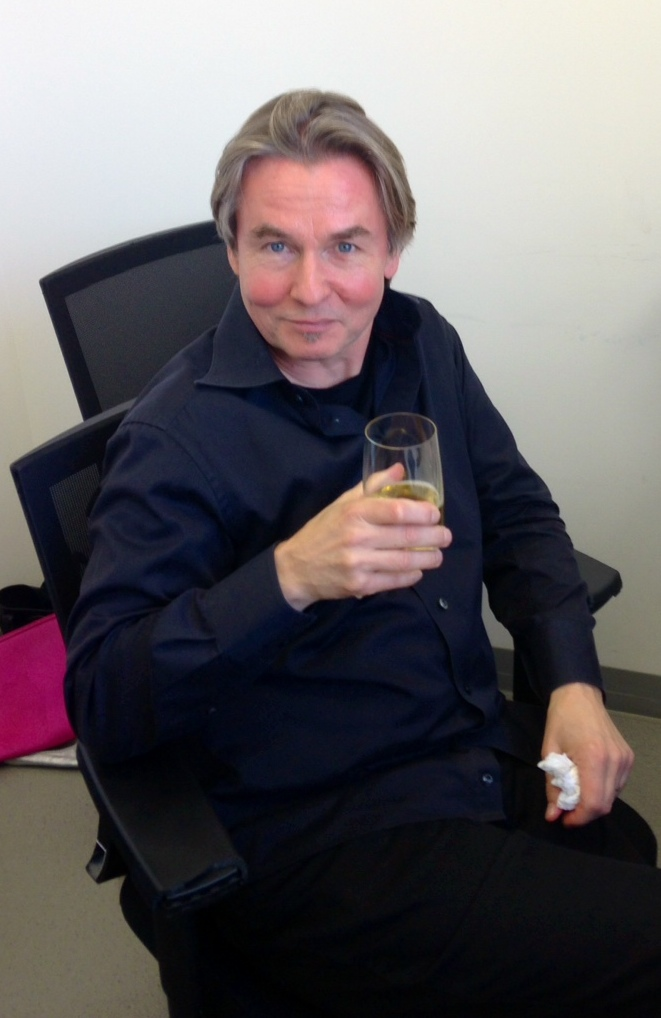
Esa-Pekka Salonen, principal conductor of the Philharmonia from 2008–2021

In 2008, Esa-Pekka Salonen became the Philharmonia's fifth principal conductor. He first conducted the orchestra in 1983 at the age of 25, as a last-minute stand-in for Michael Tilson Thomas in Mahler's Third Symphony. Salonen later recalled "I had never heard it in my life and had never seen the score." The orchestra were so impressed they invited Salonen to become their principal guest conductor, a position he assumed from 1985 to 1994. Vladimir Ashkenazy is the orchestra's conductor laureate; Dohnányi is its honorary conductor for life. From 2017 Jakub Hrůša and Santtu-Matias Rouvali have been the orchestra's principal guest conductors. The orchestra's website reported in 2018 that Salonen and the orchestra had experimented in "groundbreaking ways to present music". The examples quoted were:

the first major virtual reality production from a UK symphony orchestra; [the] RE-RITE and Universe of Sound installations, which have allowed people all over the world to conduct, play, and step inside the orchestra through audio and video projections, and [the] app for iPad, The Orchestra, which allows the user unprecedented access to the internal workings of eight symphonic works.

The Philharmonia performs more than 160 concerts a year, more than 35 of them at the Festival Hall. It has commissioned more than a hundred works. It also records music for films, computer games and commercial CD releases. Under Salonen the orchestra has taken part in a series of projects at the Festival Hall: "City of Light: Paris 1900–1950" (2015), "City of Dreams: Vienna 1900–1935" (2009), "Bill Viola's Tristan und Isolde" (2010), "Infernal Dance: Inside the World of Béla Bartók" (2011), "Woven Words", a centenary celebration of Witold Lutosławski (2013) and "Myths and Rituals", a five-concert festival of music by Igor Stravinsky (2015–17). In recent years the Philharmonia's extensive international touring schedule has included appearances in China, the Czech Republic, France, Germany, Iceland, Spain, Sweden and Switzerland. Since 2017, the Philharmonia has been a resident orchestra at the Garsington Opera festival.

Salonen concluded his principal conductorship after the 2020–2021 season, and Helen Sprott stood down as its managing director. Santtu-Matias Rouvali was appointed as the next principal conductor, effective with the 2021–2022 season, with an initial contract of 5 years. Salonen took the title of conductor emeritus and became an honorary member of the orchestra.

In 2023, members of the orchestra were selected to play at the coronation of Charles III and Camilla.

The Philharmonia Orchestra marked its 80th anniversary during the 2025-2026 season with a programme exploring the theme of Music and Identity. The season included more than 25 performances at the Royal Festival Hall in London, featuring Principal Conductor Santtu-Matias Rouvali, Principal Guest Conductor Marin Alsop, Featured Artist Víkingur Ólafsson and Featured Composer Gabriela Ortiz. Other artists appearing during the season included Bruce Liu, Nicola Benedetti, Alisa Weilerstein, Rafael Payare, Fazıl Say and Maxim Vengerov. Alongside its London season, the orchestra continued its residency programme in Bedford, Leicester, Canterbury and Basingstoke. Anniversary initiatives included the launch of Philharmonia Social, which comprised a volunteer programme, player-led pre-concert talks and the provision of 80 free tickets for first-time attendees at classical concerts.

In February 2026, the orchestra returned to Mauritius, having become the first international orchestra to create a Festival of orchestral music on the island in 2024. The anniversary season also included a tour of the United States, culminating in two performances at Carnegie Hall. These concerts featured works performed on the Philharmonia's first US tour in 1955, conducted by Herbert von Karajan, which coincided with the orchestra's tenth anniversary. The season concluded with a recreation at the Royal Festival Hall of a historic 1947 Philharmonia concert conducted by Richard Strauss, linking the orchestra's anniversary celebrations to its founding years.

In September 2026, the orchestra announced simultaneously the scheduled conclusion of Rouvali's tenure as principal conductor at the close of the 2027–2028 season, and the appointment of Manfred Honeck as its seventh principal conductor, effective with the start of the 2028–2029 season in September 2028.

== Recordings ==
The orchestra's first recording, a Sinfonia by J. C. Bach, made in July 1945, was never released. Wolf's Italian Serenade recorded at the same sessions, was the Philharmonia's first published record. It was conducted by Walter Susskind, who made many recordings with the orchestra over the next fifteen years. In the same period, others who worked regularly with the orchestra were Alceo Galliera and Paul Kletzki. For Viennese operettas, Lovro von Matačić and Otto Ackermann were Legge's favoured conductors.

Many of the orchestra's highest-profile releases were operas. Within days of its inauguration the Philharmonia played in a complete recording of Purcell's Dido and Aeneas conducted by Constant Lambert. Among the opera sets in which the orchestra played in the 1950s were the 1952 Tristan und Isolde mentioned above, and six sets conducted by Karajan: Hansel and Gretel (1953), Così fan tutte (1954), Ariadne auf Naxos (1954), Die Fledermaus (1955), Der Rosenkavalier (1956) and Falstaff (1956). Later sets from the 1950s were The Barber of Seville (Galliera, 1957); Capriccio (Sawallisch, 1957); Lucia di Lammermoor (Serafin, 1959), Le nozze di Figaro and Don Giovanni (both Giulini, 1959).

Other recordings by the Philharmonia in the 1940s and 1950s include Leonard Bernstein as soloist and conductor in Ravel's Piano Concerto in G, a series of Walton's major works, conducted by the composer, Schumann's Piano Concerto with Dinu Lipatti as soloist and Karajan conducting (his first recording with the orchestra), Mozart's Horn Concertos with Brain as soloist and Karajan conducting, and cycles of Beethoven and Brahms symphonies conducted by Klemperer.

In the 1960s and 1970s, the orchestra made many recordings. Of those made for EMI, the company later reissued many in the series "Great Recordings of the Century". They include piano concertos by Beethoven with Emil Gilels and Daniel Barenboim as soloists, Chopin with Maurizio Pollini and Mozart with Annie Fischer; symphonies by Bruckner and Mahler conducted by Barbirolli and Klemperer; orchestral music by Debussy (conducted by Giulini) and Wagner (Klemperer); choral works including Bach's Mass in B minor, St Matthew Passion, Beethoven's Missa solemnis and Brahms's German Requiem under Klemperer, and Verdi's Requiem under Giulini; Mahler's orchestral songs sung by Christa Ludwig and Janet Baker; and in the operatic repertoire Così fan tutte conducted by Karl Böhm and Fidelio and Der fliegende Holländer conducted by Klemperer.

In the 1980s, in addition to the recordings made with its chief conductors, mentioned above, the orchestra recorded extensively. Recordings from this decade include the symphonies of Elgar, Vaughan Williams and Walton, conducted by Bernard Haitink for EMI; a Sibelius symphony cycle conducted by Ashkenazy and the Mozart piano concertos with Ashkenazy directing from the keyboard, for Decca; Madama Butterfly with Maazel (CBS) and Fauré's Requiem with Giulini (DG). In the last decade of the 20th century and the first decade of the 21st, the orchestra's recordings included more discs conducted by Ashkenazy, including symphonies by Beethoven and Tchaikovsky for Decca; Beethoven and Schumann symphonies with Christian Thielemann for DG, and a series of recordings of the major works of Stravinsky, and another of those of Schoenberg, conducted by Robert Craft, released on the Naxos label.

External audio
- Charles Dutoit conducts the Philharmonia Orchestra performing works by Tchaikovsky: Piano Concerto No. 1 in B flat minor, Op. 23, with Pascal Devoyon; Violin Concerto in D, Op. 35, with Pierre Amoyal in 1991 – via Internet Archive

Live recordings of some of the orchestra's early concerts have been issued on CD, including Strauss conducting the Sinfonia Domestica, Furtwängler and Flagstad in the first performance of the Four Last Songs, and Toscanini's Brahms cycle. A later live recording was the last concert conducted by Klemperer (September 1971: Beethoven Overture: King Stephen, and Fourth Piano Concerto with Daniel Adni; and Brahms's Third Symphony).

In 2009, the orchestra began a collaboration with the record label Signum, with the release of a live recording of Schoenberg's Gurrelieder; later recordings by the Philharmonia on Signum have ranged from the symphonic repertoire (including symphonies by Beethoven, Berlioz, Brahms, Elgar, Mahler, Rachmaninoff, Schubert and Tchaikovsky) to opera and ballet (Bartók's Duke Bluebeard's Castle and The Miraculous Mandarin).

=== Film scores ===
The British Film Institute lists more than a hundred films with soundtrack scores played by the Philharmonia. They include The Life and Adventures of Nicholas Nickleby (1946); Hamlet, Oliver Twist and Scott of the Antarctic (1948); Kind Hearts and Coronets and Passport to Pimlico (1949); "The Elusive Pimpernel" (1950); The Cruel Sea (1953); Battle of the Bulge (1965); Lady Caroline Lamb (1972); King David (1985); The King and I (1999); Great Expectations (2012); and The Lady in the Van (2015).

=== Voyager Golden Record ===
In 1977, a recording of the first movement of Beethoven's 5th Symphony by the Philharmonia Orchestra conducted by Klemperer was selected by NASA to be included on the Voyager Golden Record, a gold-plated copper record that was sent into space on the Voyager space craft. The record contained sounds and images which had been selected as examples of the diversity of life and culture on Earth.

== Notes, references and sources ==
=== Sources ===
- Haltrecht, Montague (1975). The Quiet Showman: Sir David Webster and the Royal Opera House. London: Collins. ISBN 978-0-00-211163-8.
- Hill, Ralph (1951). Music 1951. Harmondsworth: Penguin. OCLC 635928181.
- Hunt, John (1996). Makers of the Philharmonia. London: John Hunt. ISBN 978-0-9525827-6-2.
- Hunt, John; Pettitt, Stephen (2009). Philharmonia Orchestra: Complete Discography 1945–1987. London: Travis and Emery. ISBN 978-1-906857-16-5.
- Kennedy, Michael (1987). Adrian Boult. London: Hamish Hamilton. ISBN 978-0-333-48752-5.
- Kenyon, Nicholas (1981). The BBC Symphony Orchestra – The First Fifty Years, 1930–1980. London: British Broadcasting Corporation. ISBN 978-0-563-17617-6.
- Morrison, Richard (2004). Orchestra. London: Faber and Faber. ISBN 978-0-571-21584-3.
- Osborne, Richard (1998). Herbert von Karajan. London: Chatto & Windus. ISBN 978-0-7011-6714-1.
- Peacock, Alan (1970). Report on Orchestral Resources in Great Britain. London: Arts Council of Great Britain. ISBN 978-0-11-981062-2.
- Pettitt, Stephen (1985). Philharmonia Orchestra: A Record of Achievement 1945–1985. London: Robert Hale. ISBN 978-0-7090-2371-5.
- Pirouet, Edmund (1998). Heard Melodies are Sweet – A History of the London Philharmonic Orchestra. Hove: Book Guild. ISBN 978-1-85776-381-2.
- Pound, Reginald (1959). Sir Henry Wood. London: Cassell. OCLC 603264427.
- Previn, André (1979). Orchestra. London: Macdonald and Jane's. ISBN 978-0-354-04420-2.
- Reid, Charles (1968). Malcolm Sargent: A Biography. London: Hamish Hamilton. ISBN 978-0-241-91316-1.
- Robinson, Paul; Surtees, Bruce (1976). Karajan. London: Macdonald and Janes. ISBN 978-0-354-04031-0.
- Schwarzkopf, Elisabeth (1982). On and Off the Record: A Memoir of Walter Legge. London: Faber and Faber. ISBN 978-0-571-11928-8.
