= Giovanni Grancino =

Milanese luthier (1637 - 1709)

Giovanni Grancino (1637–1709), son of Andrea Grancino, was one of the early Milanese luthiers, and may have worked with his brother, Francesco.

== Background ==
Giovanni was the most prominent member of the family of luthiers Grancino. Other members included Andrea Grancino, Francesco Grancino, Gianbattista Grancino (or Giovanni Battista Grancino) and Paolo Grancino. Their instruments were played by Yehudi Menuhin (violin), Siegfried Palm (cello) and Adrian Beers (double bass), among others.

Grancino's workshops were all located on Contrada Larga, now Via Larga in Milan. His instruments bear the characteristic segno della corona (mark of the crown).

== Instruments ==
Although the luthiers of Milan created instruments of varying quality, Grancino's violins, violas, cellos and double basses are considered superior. Grancino used a varnish which was a finely textured clear yellow to pale brown color.

Grancino's early instrument patterns and designs were influenced by Niccolò Amati of Cremona, whose impressive works influenced many Italian luthiers of the period. However, Grancino's later productions show flatter arching and narrower form under the influence of Stradivari. Grancino's cellos tend to be larger than others, yet with a clear sound characteristic of the Italian luthiers.

The Grancino manufactory was continued by members of the Testore family. The eldest of them, Carlo Giuseppe Testore, built a violin for Grancino which is now housed in the National Music Museum on the campus of the University of South Dakota.

Among Grancino's students may have been the Milanese luthier Giovanni Vasallo, although recent scholarship questions this.

== Recordings made with string instruments by Grancino ==
- Sigiswald Kuijken, Luc Devos. Mozart. The Sonatas for Fortepiano and Violin. Label: Accent. Violin from ca. 1700.

== Fictional roles ==
Grancino's violins play an interesting role in fiction. Canadian author, Emily-Jane Hills Orford's (born Toronto, 1957) novel, "Spring" (PublishAmerica 2005), features a Grancino violin with a mystery to unravel. American Harold Decker's self-published novel, "I, Giulia: The View Through F-Holes," recounts the life of his treasured Grancino violin. Canadian children's performer, Peggy Hills, (born Toronto 1950) also featured a Grancino violin in her children's recording, "Peggy's Violin", which was nominated for a Juno in 2007.
