= Reginald Kell =

English clarinettist (1906–1981)

Kell c. 1950s

Reginald Clifford Kell (8 June 1906 – 5 August 1981) was an English clarinettist. He was noted especially for his career as a soloist and chamber music player. He was the principal clarinettist in leading British orchestras, including the London Philharmonic, Philharmonia, and Royal Philharmonic, and was also active as a solo recording artist.

Kell was influential as one of the first clarinettists to employ continuous vibrato to enhance the expressive quality of the instrument. He was also a noted teacher, serving two different appointments at his alma mater, the Royal Academy of Music in London. In 1948 Kell moved to the United States where he pursued a solo career and taught, with pupils including the jazz clarinettist Benny Goodman.

== Career ==
=== Early years ===
Born in York, England, Kell was awarded a scholarship to the Royal Academy of Music in London in 1929, where he studied with Haydn Draper until 1932. While still a student he was engaged as principal clarinettist of the orchestra of the Royal Philharmonic Society. After graduation he was Sir Thomas Beecham's choice as first clarinet for the London Philharmonic when the orchestra was formed in 1932. He left the LPO in 1936 and was succeeded as first clarinet by Bernard Walton. Kell was Arturo Toscanini's principal clarinettist in the Lucerne Festival Orchestra in 1939, and was invited, but declined, to take the same position in Toscanini's NBC Symphony Orchestra.

In addition to his orchestral work Kell taught at the Royal Academy between 1935 and 1939, and played in chamber music. His solo repertoire extended from Corelli and earlier to twentieth century works. He was the first prominent clarinettist to apply vibrato consciously and consistently to his tone, in which respect he modelled himself on the oboist Léon Goossens. (Kell's contemporary Jack Brymer was another pioneer of vibrato on the clarinet, but came to prominence later than Kell.) Inspired by the great singers with whom he came in contact, notably Kirsten Flagstad, Kell sought to emulate their warm expressive sounds on the clarinet.

During the Second World War Kell was principal clarinettist of the Liverpool Philharmonic Orchestra, at a time when its members included many of the country's leading players. When Walter Legge founded the Philharmonia Orchestra in 1945 Kell became its principal clarinettist. At its first concert, conducted by Beecham, Kell was the soloist in Mozart's Clarinet Concerto. The following year Beecham founded the Royal Philharmonic Orchestra and as the Philharmonia in its early days played few concerts, working mostly in the recording studio, Kell was able to serve as principal in both orchestras, as did the horn player Dennis Brain. In 1948 Kell gave up both positions; he was succeeded at the Philharmonia by Walton, and at the Royal Philharmonic by Brymer.

=== Later years ===
Kell moved to the United States in 1948, making a successful concert and recording career. He was also a noted teacher, his best-known pupil being Benny Goodman, who approached him for lessons in 1948–49. Kell initially refused, considering that any necessary changes would initially have an adverse effect on Goodman's playing before improving it; he did not want the American public to view him as "the man who ruined our Benny Goodman." Goodman persisted and Kell accepted him as a student in 1952 and taught him until his return to England. Kell's other pupils included the soloist and conductor Alan Hacker, and Peanuts Hucko. From 1951 to 1957, Kell was trustee and professor at the Aspen Music School in Colorado.

Kell returned to England in 1958, taking up an appointment at the Royal Academy of Music. Among his pupils was Harrison Birtwistle. Kell retired from playing in his early fifties, and returned to the US in 1959, where he was director of Boosey & Hawkes's band instrument division from 1959 to 1966. He retired in 1966 and died in Frankfort, Kentucky, in 1981.

In 2007, the Deutsche Grammophon label issued a multi-CD box set of all of Kell's recordings for the American Decca company (CD set 477 5280).

== Discography ==
As a conductor Kell directed recordings of the two Mozart wind serenades, in C minor, K.388 and E♭ major (1951, Decca DL 9540), with the "Kell Chamber Players". The following table lists some of his recordings as a soloist.

| Composer | Title | Other players | Date and Cat No| |
|---|---|---|---|
| Bartók | Contrasts | Melvin Ritter, violin, Joel Rosen, piano | 1953, DL 9740 |
| Beethoven | Trio for Piano, Clarinet and Violoncello in B♭ major, Op. 11 ("Gassenhauer") | Frank Miller, cello, Mieczyslaw Horszowski, piano | 1950, DL 9543 |
| Benjamin | Jamaican Rumba | Brooks Smith, piano | 1957, DL 9926 |
| Brahms | Clarinet Quintet in B minor, Op. 115 | Busch Quartet | 1938, DB 8471-4 |
| Brahms | Clarinet Quintet in B minor, Op. 115 | Fine Arts Quartet | 1951, DL 9532 |
| Brahms | Sonata for Clarinet and Piano in F minor, Op. 120 No.1 | Joel Rosen, piano | 1953, DL 9639 |
| Brahms | Sonata for Clarinet and Piano in E♭ major, Op. 120 No.2 | Joel Rosen, piano | 1953, DL 9639 |
| Brahms | Trio for Clarinet, Cello and Piano in A minor, Op. 114 | Frank Miller, cello, Mieczyslaw Horszowski, piano | 1950, DL 9732 / 7524 |
| Corelli | Giga (from Recorder Sonata in C major, Op. 5 No.9) (transcr. Kell) | Brooks Smith, piano | 1957, DL 9926 |
| Debussy | Première rhapsodie for Clarinet and Piano | Joel Rosen, piano | 1951, DL 9570 |
| Debussy | Petite Piece | Brooks Smith, piano | 1957, DL 9926 |
| Debussy | La plus que lente (arr. Kell) | Salvatore Camarata and his Orchestra | 1953, DL 7550 |
| Debussy | La fille aux cheveux de lin (arr. Kell) | Salvatore Camarata and his Orchestra | 1953, DL 7550 |
| Debussy | Rêverie (arr. Kell) | Salvatore Camarata and his Orchestra | 1953, DL 7550 |
| Debussy | Le petit berger (arr. Kell) | Salvatore Camarata and his Orchestra | 1953, DL 7550 |
| Godard | Berceuse (from Jocelyn) | Brooks Smith, piano | 1957, DL 9926 |
| Handel | Siciliana and Gigue (from Recorder Sonata in F major, HWV 369) (transcr. Kell) | Brooks Smith, piano | 1957, DL 9926 |
| Handel | Adagio (from Violin Sonata in F major, HWV 370) (transcr. Kell) | Brooks Smith, piano | 1957, DL 9926 |
| Handel | Allegro (from Oboe Sonata in F major, HWV 363a) (transcr. Kell) | Brooks Smith, piano | 1957, DL 9926 |
| Hindemith | Sonata for Clarinet and Piano in B♭ | Joel Rosen, piano | 1951, DL 9570 |
| Kreisler | Rondino uber ein Thema von Beethoven | Brooks Smith, piano | 1957, DL 9926 |
| Kreisler | Caprice Viennois Op. 2 | Salvatore Camarata and his Orchestra | 1953, DL 4077 |
| Kreisler | Liebesleid | Salvatore Camarata and his Orchestra | 1953, DL 4077 |
| Kreisler | Liebesfreud | Salvatore Camarata and his Orchestra | 1953, DL 4077 |
| Kreisler | Stars in My Eyes | Salvatore Camarata and his Orchestra | 1953, DL 4077 |
| Kreisler | Schön Rosmarin | Salvatore Camarata and his Orchestra | 1953, DL 4077 |
| Milhaud | Suite Op. 157b | Melvin Ritter, violin, Joel Rosen, piano | 1953, DL 9740 |
| Mourant | Ecstasy | Salvatore Camarata and his Orchestra | 1953, DL 7550 |
| Mourant | The Pied Piper | Salvatore Camarata and his Orchestra | 1953, DL 7550 |
| Mourant | Blue Haze | Salvatore Camarata and his Orchestra | 1953, DL 7550 |
| Mozart | Clarinet Concerto in A major, K.622 | Zimbler Sinfonietta | 1950, DL 7500 |
| Mozart | Quintet for Clarinet and String Quartet in A major, K.581 | Fine Arts Quartet | 1951, DL 9600 |
| Mozart | Trio for Piano, Clarinet and Viola in E♭ major, K.498 "Kegelstatt" Trio | Lillian Fuchs, viola, Mieczyslaw Horszowski, piano | 1950, DL 9543 |
| Porter-Brown | Dance of the Three Old Maids | Salvatore Camarata and his Orchestra | |
| Ravel | Piece en forme de habanera | Brooks Smith, piano | 1957, DL 9926 |
| Richardson | Roundelay | Brooks Smith, piano | 1957, DL 9926 |
| Saint-Saëns | Sonata for Clarinet and Piano in E♭ major, Op. 167 | Brooks Smith, piano | 1957, DL 9941 |
| Schumann | Fantasiestücke, Op. 73 | Joel Rosen, piano | 1953, DL 9744 |
| Stravinsky | Three Pieces for Solo Clarinet | | 1951, DL 9570 |
| Szalowski | Sonatina for Clarinet and Piano | Brooks Smith, piano | 1957, DL 9941 |
| Templeton | Pocket-size Sonata No.1 for Clarinet and Piano | Brooks Smith, piano | 1957, DL 9941 |
| Vaughan Williams | Six Studies in English Folksong | Brooks Smith, piano | 1957, DL 9941 |
| Weber | Grand Duo concertant in E♭ major, Op. 48 | Joel Rosen, piano | 1953, DL 9744 |
