= Donald Hazelwood =

Australian violinist (1930–2025)

Donald Leslie Grant Hazelwood AO OBE (1 March 1930 – 8 March 2025) was an Australian violinist and concertmaster.

== Background ==
His first wife Anne Menzies was a clarinetist with the Sydney Symphony Orchestra for 26 years until 1994. Their daughter Jane Hazelwood is a violist. Their son-in-law was the violinist Carl Pini. After Anne Menzies' death, Donald remarried in 2000 to Helen Phillips.

He played a Giovanni Baptista Grancino violin made in 1716.

Hazelwood died in Sydney on 8 March 2025, at the age of 95.

== Career ==
Donald Hazelwood first played with the Sydney Symphony Orchestra in 1952, as a second violinist under Eugene Goossens.

In 1965, he was appointed co-concertmaster with Robert Miller, later becoming concertmaster, a position he held for 33 years until his retirement in 1998.

From 1988 to 1989, Hazelwood was artistic director of the National Ensemble at the Sydney Conservatorium of Music.

From 1989 to 1991, and in 1996, he was Director of the Australian Youth Orchestra National Music Camp.

He was a life member of Australian Youth Orchestra.

In 1997, Hazelwood had a tribute concert at the Sydney Opera House, where he performed Dvorak's Romance in F minor with the Sydney Symphony.

In 1998, he retired as concertmaster after 33 years with the Orchestra.

A biography, From Farmer to Fiddler: The Story of Donald Hazelwood Concert Master Emeritus by Helen Bunday, was published in 2007.

== Works ==
=== Individuals ===
- Flautist James Galway (Bach's Brandenburg concertos Nos. 4 & 5 in 1990)

=== Groups ===
==== Spokane Symphony Orchestra ====
Donald Hazelwood represented Australia at the 1974 Expo in Spokane, Washington by performing Tchaikovsky's Violin Concerto in D with the Spokane Symphony Orchestra.

==== World Philharmonic Orchestra ====
Donald Hazelwood was one of two Australian musicians chosen to participate in the performance of the World Philharmonic Orchestra in Stockholm in 1985.

==== Austral String Quartet ====
Hazelwood was leader of the Austral String Quartet and made two world tours with the group.

==== Hazelwood Trio ====
Donald Hazelwood made four tours of Asia with the Hazelwood Trio, a group including his wife, Anne Menzies and pianist Rachel Valler. The final tour was made in 1997.

==== ABC Orchestra ====
Donald Hazelwood performed as a soloist with the Australian Broadcasting Corporation orchestras on many occasions, including:

- Barry Conyngham's work Ice Carving for Violin Solo and Strings
- Peter Sculthorpe's Irkanda IV (released on CD)
- Violin concertos by Elgar (B minor) and Bruch (No. 1 in G minor)
- Solo appearances at Under the Stars in 1992 and 1995.

== Awards ==
Donald was appointed an Officer of the Order of the British Empire (OBE) in 1976 and was made an Officer of the Order of Australia (AO) in 1988 for his services to music.

=== Bernard Heinze Memorial Award ===
The Sir Bernard Heinze Memorial Award is given to a person who has made an outstanding contribution to music in Australia.

Year	Nominee / work	Award	Result
1997	Donald Hazelwood	Sir Bernard Heinze Memorial Award	awarded
