= Bernard Walton =

British classical clarinettist (1917–1972)

Bernard Walton (24 March 1917 – 3 June 1972) was a British classical clarinettist.

== Biography ==
Walton was born into a musical family. His grandfather was a cellist with the Hallé Orchestra under the eponymous founder Charles Hallé, and his father played in the Queen's Hall Orchestra. He studied at the Royal College of Music with George Anderson, the principal clarinettist at the founding of the London Symphony Orchestra in 1904. He was made a Fellow of the Royal College of Music (FRCM) in 1968.

In 1937, shortly before his 20th birthday, Walton was appointed principal clarinettist of the London Philharmonic Orchestra, joining his father, uncle, and brother as members of that orchestra. He served as principal clarinettist of Walter Legge's Philharmonia from 1953 to 1964. When Legge attempted to disband the orchestra in 1964, Walton tried unsuccessfully to dissuade him, and when that failed Walton took the lead in establishing the New Philharmonia Orchestra as a self-governing body. He served as its first chairman.

After leaving the orchestra in April 1966, Walton rejoined the London Philharmonic, and devoted more time to chamber music, forming the Music Group of London with Hugh Bean, Eileen Croxford, and David Parkhouse. He also played in the Virtuoso Chamber Ensemble with Léon Goossens and others. Along with the other leaders of the woodwind section of the Philharmonia – Gareth Morris, Sidney ("Jock") Sutcliffe, and Gwydion Brooke – Walton formed what Legge liked to call "Legge's Royal Flush". In addition to his work as a performer, Walton was professor of clarinet at the Royal College of Music from 1954 until his death.
