= Paolo Antonio Testore =

Milanese luthier (1700 - 1767)

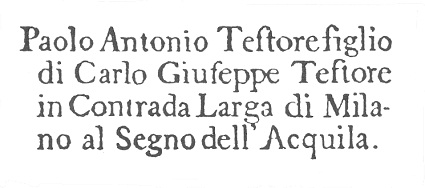
Violin label from Paolo Antonio Testore

Paolo Antonio Testore (born 1700 - died 1767) was a Milanese luthier. He was born in Milan, the second son of Carlo Giuseppe Testore, also a noted luthier, and worked out of the family's workshop under the "Sign of the Eagle" on Contrada Larga in Milan. He was one of the three finest instrument-makers from the Testore family, but a distinctive characteristic of Paolo Antonio's work is that he often omitted purfling and sometimes used lower quality wood.

Testore's brother Carlo Antonio Testore was also a luthier, and their sons Giovanni, son of Carlo, and Gennaro(?), son of Paolo, continued the family business in Milan during the 1760s.
