= Carlo Giuseppe Testore =

Italian luthier (c. 1665 – 1738)

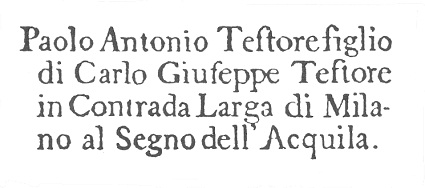
Violin label from Paolo Antonio Testore

Carlo Giuseppe Testore (c. 1665–1738) was an Italian luthier, who worked in his later life in Milan.

== Biography ==
Testore was born in Novara. A student of Giovanni Grancino, he went to Milan in 1687 and set up his workshop at the Sign of the Eagle ("All'aquila") in the Contrada Larga in Milan. His two sons, Carlo Antonio Testore (1688 – after 1764) and Paolo Antonio Testore (1690 – after 1760), students of their father, also worked as luthiers in Milan. Giovanni, son of Carlo, and (?Genn)-aro, son of Paolo, continued the workshop in Milan during the 1760s.

== Testore instruments today ==
Carlo Giuseppe Testore is especially valued for his double basses. Currently, Russian violist Yuri Bashmet plays a Paolo Antonio Testore instrument. National Arts Centre Orchestra's former principal cellist Amanda Forsyth uses a Testore cello, manufactured in 1699, as does solo cellist Jacob Shaw with a cello of unknown date, belonging to the Royal Danish Academy of Music collection. Clifford Spohr, principal emeritus of the Dallas Symphony Orchestra double bass section, currently owns and uses a double bass made by Carlo Giuseppe Testore; this instrument was built in Milan in the year of the maker's death; it has five strings, plus a low C extension by Winterhalter, giving it a range greater than normal.
