= Hugh Bean =

British musician

External audio
- You may hear Hugh Bean performing Vaughan Williams' The Lark Ascending with Sir Adrian Boult conducting the New Philharmonia Orchestra in 1966 at the Internet Archive

Hugh Cecil Bean CBE (22 September 1929 – 26 December 2003) was an English violinist.

He was born in Beckenham. After lessons from his father from the age of five, he became a pupil of Albert Sammons (and Ken Piper) when he was nine years old. Later, he attended the Royal College of Music (RCM), where at age 17 he was awarded the principal prize for violin. A further year's study with André Gertler at the Brussels Conservatory on a Boise Foundation travelling award brought him a double first prize for solo and chamber music playing, and with two other prizewinners he formed the Boise Trio. In 1951, he was awarded second place in the Carl Flesch International Violin Competition.

He was appointed professor of violin at the RCM at the age of 24 and became a freelance London orchestral player, until he was made sub-leader and then leader (1956–67) of the Philharmonia Orchestra. He was co-leader of the BBC Symphony Orchestra from 1967 to 1969, when he resigned to concentrate on an independent career, but retained his membership (1966–76) of the Music Group of London. In 1989, he returned to the Philharmonia Orchestra as co-leader, and became Leader Emeritus.

Hugh Bean performed concertos with many leading orchestras, both in the UK and abroad. As a soloist his playing was distinguished by lyrical feeling and warmth of expression in addition to technical command. He recorded Edward Elgar's Violin Concerto for EMI with the Royal Liverpool Philharmonic and Sir Charles Groves, and with the Philharmonia Orchestra he recorded Vivaldi's The Four Seasons with Leopold Stokowski, and Vaughan Williams' The Lark Ascending with Sir Adrian Boult. He made many recordings of chamber music with the Music Group of London, and together they toured extensively both performing and teaching in Europe, Scandinavia, The Middle and Far East (including four visits to China), Canada and North and South America.

During his thirty-seven years as Professor of Violin at the Royal College of Music, over fifty of his pupils found positions in London orchestras, including several as leaders. He was appointed FRCM in 1968, was awarded the Cobbett Gold Medal for chamber music in 1969 and created a Commander of the Order of the British Empire (CBE) in 1970.

Bean contributed several accounts of the nature of conducting and especially of working with Otto Klemperer when Bean was leader of Klemperer's Philharmonia orchestra. These accounts can be seen on the DVD programme "The Art of Conducting."

Bean played a violin by Pietro Guarneri (Venice 1734), on extended loan from Amy Haswell-Wilson, and owned one by Carlo Tononi dated 1716. He was survived by his wife Mary, and one daughter.
