= Carlo Antonio Testore =

Milanese luthier (1687–1765)

Carlo Antonio Testore (1687–1765) was a Milanese luthier.

== Life and career ==
Carlo Antonio Testore was born in Milan, the son of Carlo Giuseppe Testore, also a noted luthier, and worked in the family's workshop under the "Sign of the Eagle" on Contrada Larga in Milan. The workmanship and appearance of his instruments is considered rough, but the tonal quality is excellent. One of his basses was owned and played by the noted bassist Giovanni Bottesini. He was prolific, and most active as a luthier from 1715 to 1745. His violincellos are highly prized.

Testore's brother Paolo Antonio Testore was also a luthier, and their sons Giovanni, son of Carlo, and Gennaro(?), son of Paolo, continued the family business in Milan during the 1760s. Jiří Panocha of the Panocha Quartet plays a 1743 violin by Carlo Antonio Testore.
