= London Philharmonic Orchestra =

Permanent symphony orchestra in London

- Orchestra
- Short name: LPO
- Founded: 1932
- Location: London, England
- Concert hall: Royal Festival Hall
- Principal conductor: Edward Gardner
- Website: www.lpo.org.uk

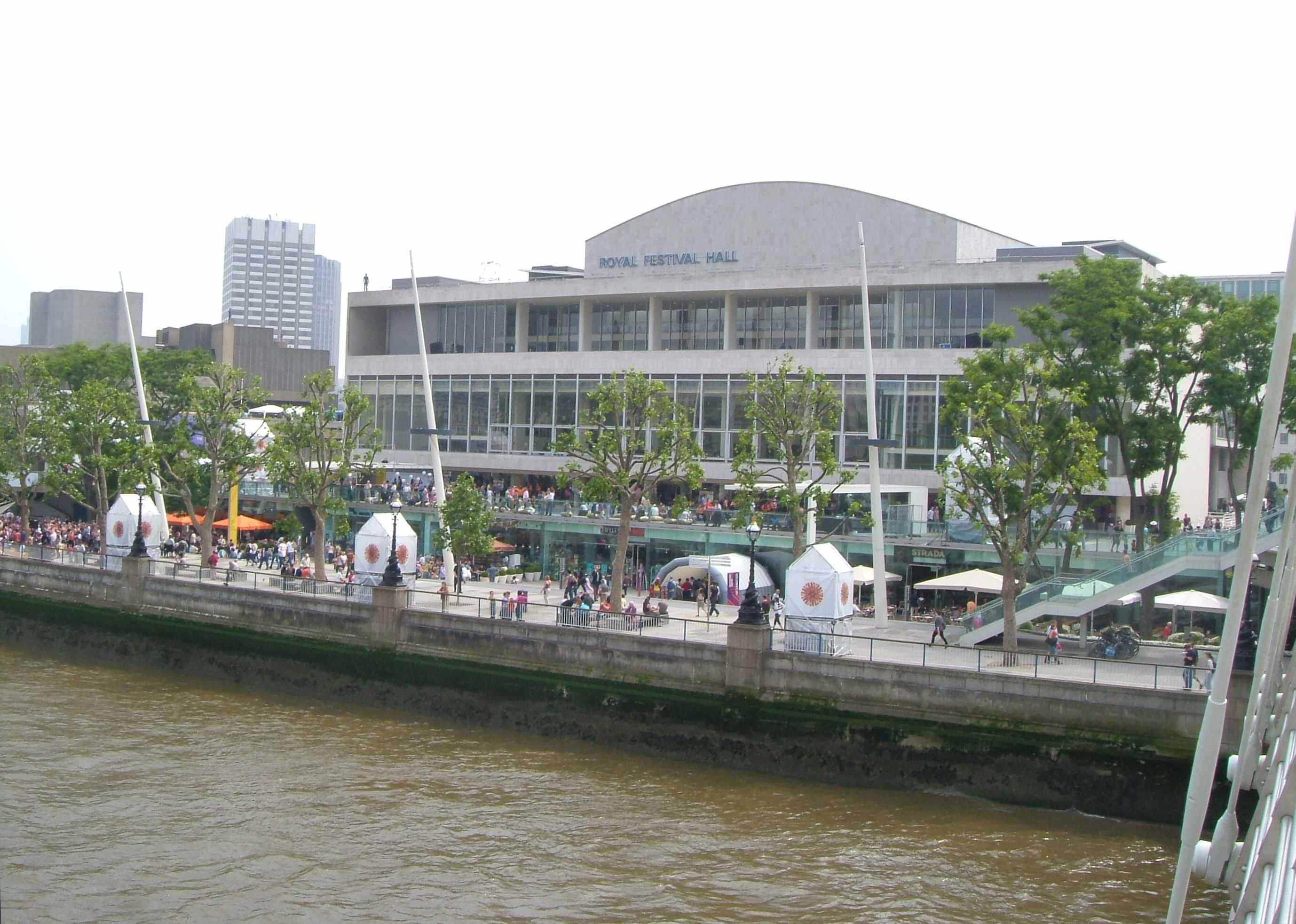
The Royal Festival Hall, London, the main base of the orchestra

The London Philharmonic Orchestra (LPO) is a British orchestra based in London. One of five permanent symphony orchestras in London, the LPO was founded by the conductors Sir Thomas Beecham and Malcolm Sargent in 1932 as a rival to the existing London Symphony and BBC Symphony Orchestras.

The founders' ambition was to build an orchestra the equal of any European or American rival. Between 1932 and the Second World War the LPO was widely judged to have succeeded in this regard. After the outbreak of war, the orchestra's private backers withdrew and the players reconstituted the LPO as a self-governing cooperative. In the post-war years, the orchestra faced challenges from two new rivals, the Philharmonia and the Royal Philharmonic. Founded respectively in 1945 and 1946, these orchestras achieved a quality of playing not matched by the older groups, including the LPO.

By the 1960s, the LPO had regained its earlier standards, and in 1964 it secured a valuable engagement to play in the Glyndebourne Festival during the summer months. In 1993 it was appointed resident orchestra of the Royal Festival Hall on the south bank of the Thames, one of London's major concert venues. Since 1995 the residency has been jointly held with the Philharmonia. In addition to its work at the Festival Hall and Glyndebourne, the LPO performs regularly at the Congress Theatre, Eastbourne and the Brighton Dome, and tours nationally and internationally.

Since Beecham, the orchestra's principal conductors have included Sir Adrian Boult, Bernard Haitink, Sir Georg Solti, Klaus Tennstedt and Vladimir Jurowski. The orchestra's current principal conductor is Edward Gardner, since 2021. The orchestra has been active in recording studios since its earliest days, and has played on hundreds of sets made by EMI, Decca and other companies. Since 2005 the LPO has had its own record label, issuing live recordings of concerts. The orchestra has played on numerous film soundtracks, including Lawrence of Arabia (1962) and the Lord of the Rings trilogy (2001–03).

== History ==
=== Background ===
In the 1920s, the London Symphony Orchestra (LSO) was the city's best-known concert and recording orchestra. Others were the Royal Albert Hall Orchestra, the orchestra of the Royal Philharmonic Society, the BBC's Wireless Symphony Orchestra and Sir Henry Wood's Queen's Hall Orchestra. All except the last of these were essentially ad hoc ensembles, with little continuity of personnel, (Note: Despite the efforts of Wood, Beecham and others, the deputy system remained a traditional part of the London orchestral scene. A player booked for a concert could accept a better-paid engagement and send a substitute in his stead. The treasurer of the Royal Philharmonic Society described the system thus: "A, whom you want, signs to play at your concert. He sends B (whom you don't mind) to the first rehearsal. B, without your knowledge or consent, sends C to the second rehearsal. Not being able to play at the concert, C sends D, whom you would have paid five shillings to stay away.") and none approached the excellence of the best continental and American orchestras. This became obvious in 1927 when the Berlin Philharmonic, under Wilhelm Furtwängler, gave two concerts at the Queen's Hall. The chief music critic of The Times later commented, "the British public ... was electrified when it heard the disciplined precision of the Berlin Philharmonic ... This apparently was how an orchestra could, and, therefore, ought to sound". After the Berliners, London heard a succession of major foreign orchestras, including the Concertgebouw Orchestra of Amsterdam under Willem Mengelberg and the Philharmonic-Symphony Orchestra of New York under Arturo Toscanini.

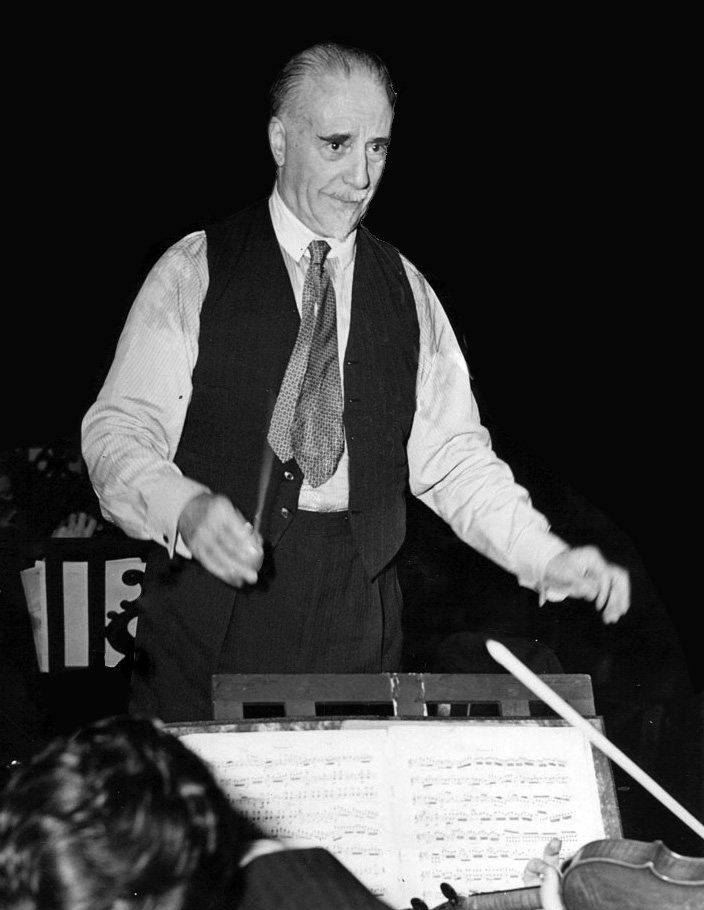
Sir Thomas Beecham, founding father and first conductor of the LPO

Among those determined that London should have a permanent orchestra of similar excellence were Sir John Reith, director-general of the British Broadcasting Corporation (BBC), and the conductor Sir Thomas Beecham. In 1928 they opened discussions about jointly setting up such an ensemble, but after 18 months of negotiations it became clear that the corporation and the conductor had irreconcilable priorities. Beecham demanded more personal control of the orchestra and repertoire than the BBC was willing to concede, and his priorities were the opera house and the concert hall rather than the broadcasting studio. The BBC went ahead without him, and under its director of music, Adrian Boult, launched the BBC Symphony Orchestra in October 1930, to immense acclaim.

In 1931, Beecham was approached by the rising young conductor Malcolm Sargent with a proposal to set up a permanent, salaried orchestra with a subsidy guaranteed by Sargent's patrons, the Courtauld family. Originally Sargent and Beecham envisaged a reshuffled version of the LSO, but the orchestra, a self-governing body, balked at weeding out and replacing underperforming players. In 1932, Beecham lost patience and agreed with Sargent to set up a new orchestra from scratch. With the BBC having attracted a large number of the finest musicians from other orchestras, many in the musical world doubted that Beecham could find enough good players. He was fortunate in the timing of the enterprise: the depressed economy had severely reduced the number of freelance dates available to orchestral players. Moreover, Beecham himself was a strong attraction to many musicians: he later commented, "I always get the players. Among other considerations, they are so good they refuse to play under anybody but me." In a study of the foundation of the LPO, David Patmore writes, "The combination of steady work, occasionally higher than usual rates, variety of performance and Beecham's own magnetic personality would make such an offering irresistible to many orchestral musicians."

Beecham and Sargent had financial backing from leading figures in commerce, including Samuel Courtauld, Robert Mayer and Baron Frédéric d'Erlanger, and secured profitable contracts to record for Columbia and play for the Royal Philharmonic Society, the Royal Choral Society, the Courtauld-Sargent Concerts, Mayer's concerts for children, and the international opera season at Covent Garden.

During his earlier negotiations with the BBC, Beecham had proposed the title "London Philharmonic Orchestra", which was now adopted for the new ensemble. With the aid of the impresario Harold Holt and other influential and informed contacts he recruited 106 players. They included a few young musicians straight from music college, many established players from provincial orchestras, and 17 of the LSO's leading members. During the early years, the orchestra was led by Paul Beard and David McCallum, and included leading players such as James Bradshaw, Gwydion Brooke, Geoffrey Gilbert, Léon Goossens, Gerald Jackson, Reginald Kell, Anthony Pini and Bernard Walton. Holt became the LPO's business manager, and the management board included the orchestra's principal benefactors: Courtauld, Mayer and d'Erlanger.

=== Early years ===
Programme of the first LPO concert (modern reconstruction of unavailable original)

After twelve rehearsals, the orchestra made its debut at the Queen's Hall on 7 October 1932, conducted by Beecham. (Note: In earlier years Beecham had been notoriously late for rehearsals, usually arriving an hour after the appointed time, but now he assumed a new seriousness, always arriving punctually.) After the first item, Berlioz's Roman Carnival Overture, the audience went wild, some of them standing on their seats to clap and shout. In The Sunday Times Ernest Newman wrote, "Nothing so electrifying has been heard in a London concert room for years. The tone was magnificent, the precision perfect, the reading a miracle of fire and beauty, and the enthusiasm of the audience could not have been greater." In The Times H C Colles said that the LPO was "as fine an instrument as could be wished for"; Neville Cardus wrote in The Manchester Guardian, "nothing more sumptuous and daring in orchestral playing could be heard in more than three other cities between New York and Vienna"; and W J Turner, of The Illustrated London News, praised the orchestra's "youthful dash and virtuosity ... at last we have an independent orchestra which rivals the BBC Symphony Orchestra".

In its first season, the LPO played at eighteen concerts in the Courtauld-Sargent series; ten Royal Philharmonic Society concerts; fifteen "International Celebrity Tours" and sixteen Sunday afternoon concerts for Holt's agency, as well as Robert Mayer's children's concerts, Royal Choral Society evenings and other engagements. Soloists in the first season included the singer Eva Turner and the pianists Harriet Cohen and Clifford Curzon. In November 1932 the sixteen-year-old Yehudi Menuhin played a programme of violin concertos; those by Bach and Mozart were conducted by Beecham, and the Elgar concerto was conducted by the composer.

During the next eight years, the LPO appeared nearly a hundred times at the Queen's Hall for the Royal Philharmonic Society, played for Beecham's opera seasons at Covent Garden, and made more than 300 gramophone records. (Note: This figure refers to discs rather than whole works. The 78 rpm recordings then in use required several discs to accommodate a symphony or concerto of even moderate length.) The total number of works, as opposed to discs, recorded by the LPO and Beecham was less than a hundred. There were a few guest conductors for the Sunday concerts, but most were conducted by Beecham. In the Courtauld-Sargent series the LPO played not only under Sargent but under many guests including Bruno Walter, George Szell, Fritz Busch and Igor Stravinsky.

In addition to London engagements, the orchestra played regularly in the larger provincial cities and towns. Its first tour, in March and April 1933, started in Bristol and ended in Manchester, taking in thirteen other venues in England, Ireland and Scotland. After the last concert, The Manchester Guardian's reviewer wrote:

Never before in our experience of concert-going in Manchester have we heard orchestral playing which, throughout a whole programme, combined such nobility of style and brilliancy of execution – not the brilliancy that stops when it has made outward forms sparkle, but a quality that seems to work from within and to suffuse everything with a rich and glowing tone-colour.

=== First recording on magnetic tape ===
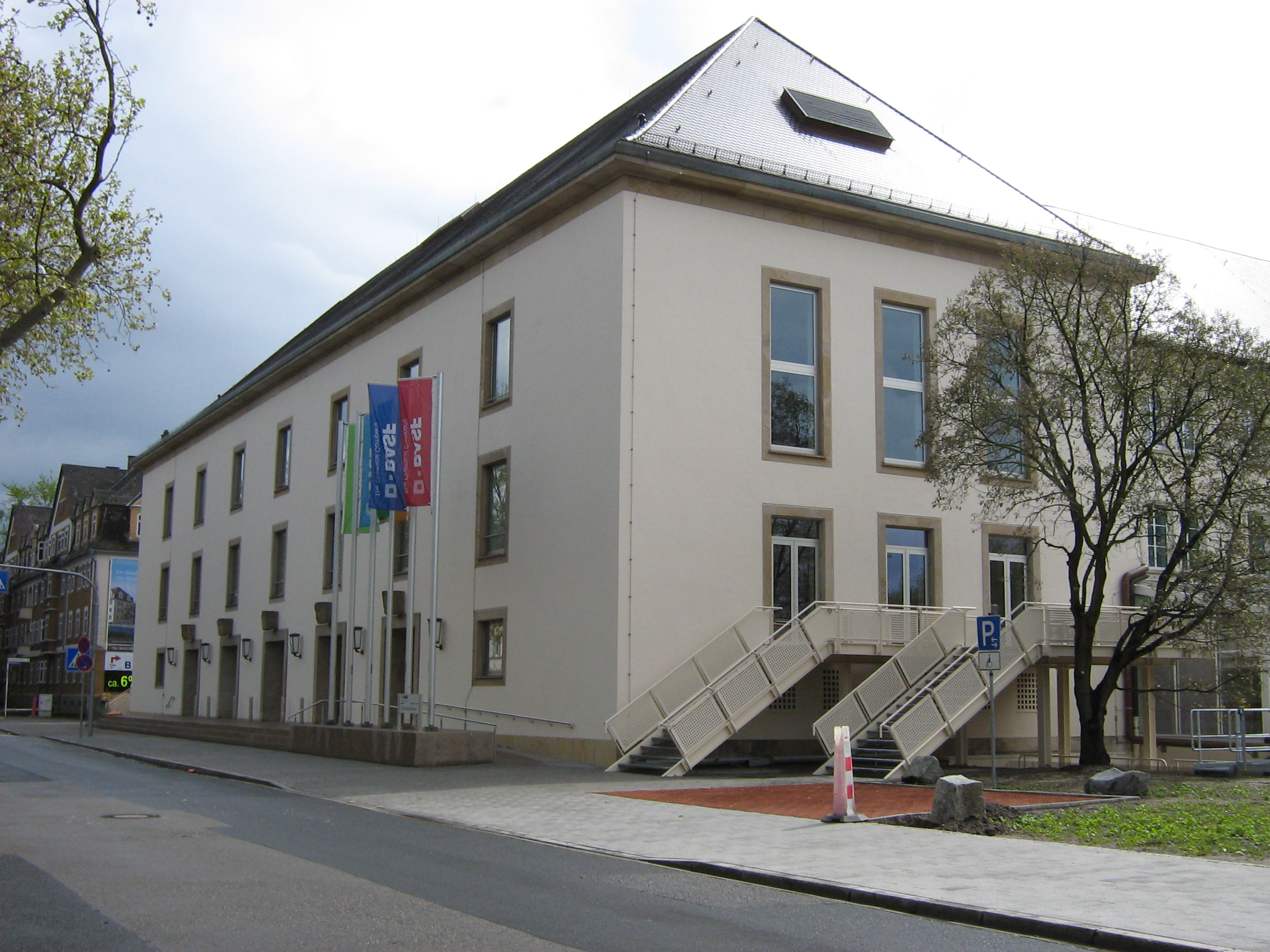
BASF Feierabendhaus

Beecham took the orchestra on a controversial tour of Germany in 1936. Throughout the tour, the orchestra ignored the custom of playing the Nazi anthem before concerts, but Beecham yielded to pressure from Hitler's government not to play the Italian Symphony by Mendelssohn, taboo to Nazi anti-Semites. There was disquiet among some of the players that their presence in Germany gave the Nazi regime a propaganda coup.

On this 1936 tour, the orchestra inadvertently made the first recognised full sound recording on magnetic tape on 19 November 1936, at the BASF Feierabendhaus (the company auditorium), but the sound was not as good as wax transcription discs, due to DC bias. The orchestra played Symphony No. 39 (Mozart) and Delius's On Hearing the First Cuckoo in Spring.

After a renovation of the BASF building in 2011, the orchestra performed at the reopening, in Germany, on 27 November 2011, with Vladimir Jurowski. It was 75 years after that first recording.

=== War and post-war years ===
As his sixtieth birthday approached in 1939, Beecham was advised by his doctors to take a year's break from conducting, and he planned to go abroad to rest in a warm climate, leaving the orchestra in other hands. The outbreak of war on 3 September 1939 obliged him to postpone his plans for several months, while he strove to secure the future of the orchestra, whose financial guarantees had been withdrawn by its backers when war was declared. The original LPO company was liquidated and Beecham raised large sums of money for the orchestra, helping its members to form themselves into a self-governing body.

Queen's Hall, destroyed, with many LPO instruments, by bombing in 1941

During the war, the LPO played in the capital and on continual tours of Britain, under Sargent and other conductors, including 50 under Richard Tauber, bringing orchestral concerts to places where they had rarely if ever been given. Many of the players' instruments were lost when the Queen's Hall was destroyed by German bombing in May 1941; an appeal was broadcast by the BBC, the response to which was enormous, with instruments donated by the public enabling the orchestra to continue.

On Beecham's return to England in 1944, the LPO welcomed him back, and in October they gave a concert together that drew superlatives from the critics. Over the next months Beecham and the orchestra gave further concerts with considerable success, but the LPO players, now their own employers, declined to give him the unfettered control that he had exercised in the 1930s. If he were to become chief conductor again it would be as a paid employee of the orchestra. Beecham, unwilling to be answerable to anybody, left the LPO and in 1946 founded a rival orchestra, the Royal Philharmonic Orchestra (RPO).

Among the conductors making guest appearances in the early post-war period were Walter, Furtwängler, Victor de Sabata and Sergiu Celibidache. Such starry events were the exception; as a rule the orchestra worked with less eminent conductors, giving an unprecedented number of performances. In 1949–50 they gave 248 concerts, compared with 103 by the London Symphony Orchestra and 32 each by the Philharmonia Orchestra and RPO. After a seven-year interregnum, the LPO engaged a new principal conductor, Eduard van Beinum, in 1947. He was initially able to work with the orchestra for only six months of the year, because of restrictions on work permits for foreign nationals. Guest conductors stood in during his absences. In 1947, the London Philharmonic Choir was founded as the chorus for the LPO.

=== 1950s ===
Van Beinum's poor health obliged him to resign in 1950. Sir Adrian Boult accepted an invitation from the LPO's managing director, Thomas Russell, to take up the principal conductorship. With Boult the LPO began a series of commercial recordings, beginning with Elgar's Falstaff, Mahler's Lieder eines fahrenden Gesellen with the mezzo-soprano Blanche Thebom, and Beethoven's First Symphony. The work of the new team was greeted with approval by reviewers. Of the Elgar, the reviewer in The Gramophone wrote, "I have heard no other conductor approach [Boult's] performance. ... His newly adopted orchestra responds admirably".

In January 1951, Boult and the LPO made a tour of Germany, described by Boult's biographer Michael Kennedy as "gruelling", with twelve concerts in as many days. (Note: Kennedy states that there were 11 concerts, but Boult lists 12 dates and venues.) The symphonies they played were Beethoven's Seventh, Haydn's London, No 104, Brahms's First, Schumann's Fourth and Schubert's Great C major. The other works were Elgar's Introduction and Allegro, Holst's The Perfect Fool ballet music, Richard Strauss's Don Juan, and Stravinsky's Firebird. Conductors of the 1951–52 season other than Boult included Ralph Vaughan Williams, Benjamin Britten and William Walton.

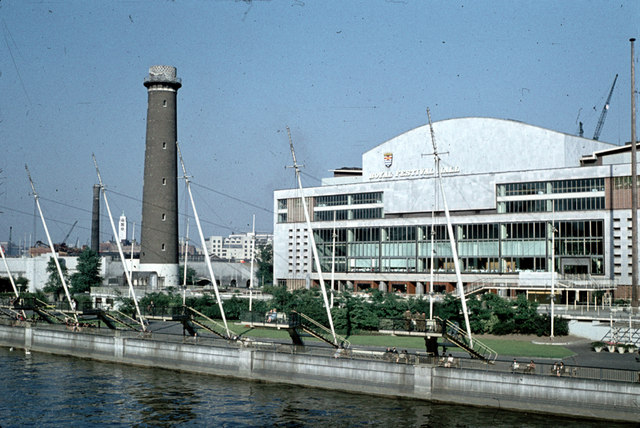
The Royal Festival Hall in the 1950s: the LPO was among the orchestras striving for residency

In 1952, the LPO negotiated a five-year contract with Decca Records that was unusually rewarding for the orchestra, giving it a 10 percent commission on most sales. On top of this, Boult always contributed his share of the recording fees to the orchestra's funds. In the same year, the LPO survived a crisis when Russell was dismissed as its managing director. He was an avowed member of the Communist party; when the Cold War began, some influential members of the LPO felt that Russell's private political affiliations compromised the orchestra, and pressed for his dismissal. Boult, as the orchestra's chief conductor, initially stood up for Russell, but when matters came to a head Boult ceased to protect him. Deprived of that crucial support, Russell was forced out. Kennedy speculates that Boult's change of mind was due to a growing conviction that the orchestra would be "seriously jeopardized financially" if Russell remained in post. A later writer, Richard Witts, suggests that Boult sacrificed Russell because he believed doing so would enhance the LPO's chance of being appointed resident orchestra at the Royal Festival Hall. (Note: Witts concludes that it was not Russell but Boult – regarded by some as past his peak – who cost the LPO the Festival Hall residency.)

The following year, the orchestra celebrated its 21st birthday, giving a series of concerts at the Festival Hall and the Albert Hall in which Boult was joined by guest conductors including Paul Kletzki, Jean Martinon, Hans Schmidt-Isserstedt, Georg Solti, Walter Susskind and Vaughan Williams. In 1956 the LPO toured the Soviet Union, the first British orchestra to do so; the conductors were Boult, Anatole Fistoulari and George Hurst, and the soloists were Alfredo Campoli and Moura Lympany. After the tour Boult retired as principal conductor, but remained closely associated with the orchestra, and was made its President in 1965. Most of his stereophonic recordings for EMI were made with the LPO.

Through the middle and late 1950s, the LPO worked with new conductors including Constantin Silvestri and Josef Krips. This was a bad period financially for the orchestra, and it was forced to abandon fixed contracts for its players with holiday and sick pay and pensions, and revert to payment by engagement. Financial disaster was averted thanks to an anonymous benefactor, generally believed to be Boult. A historian of the orchestra, Edmund Pirouet, writes that having been on an upward curve in the 1940s, by the mid-1950s the orchestra "was at best marking time".

In 1958, the LPO appointed William Steinberg, also music director of the Pittsburgh Symphony Orchestra, as chief conductor. He was a noted orchestral trainer, and did much to restore playing standards to their former levels. Steinberg resigned the LPO post after two seasons, advised by his doctor to restrict his activities.

=== 1960s and 70s ===
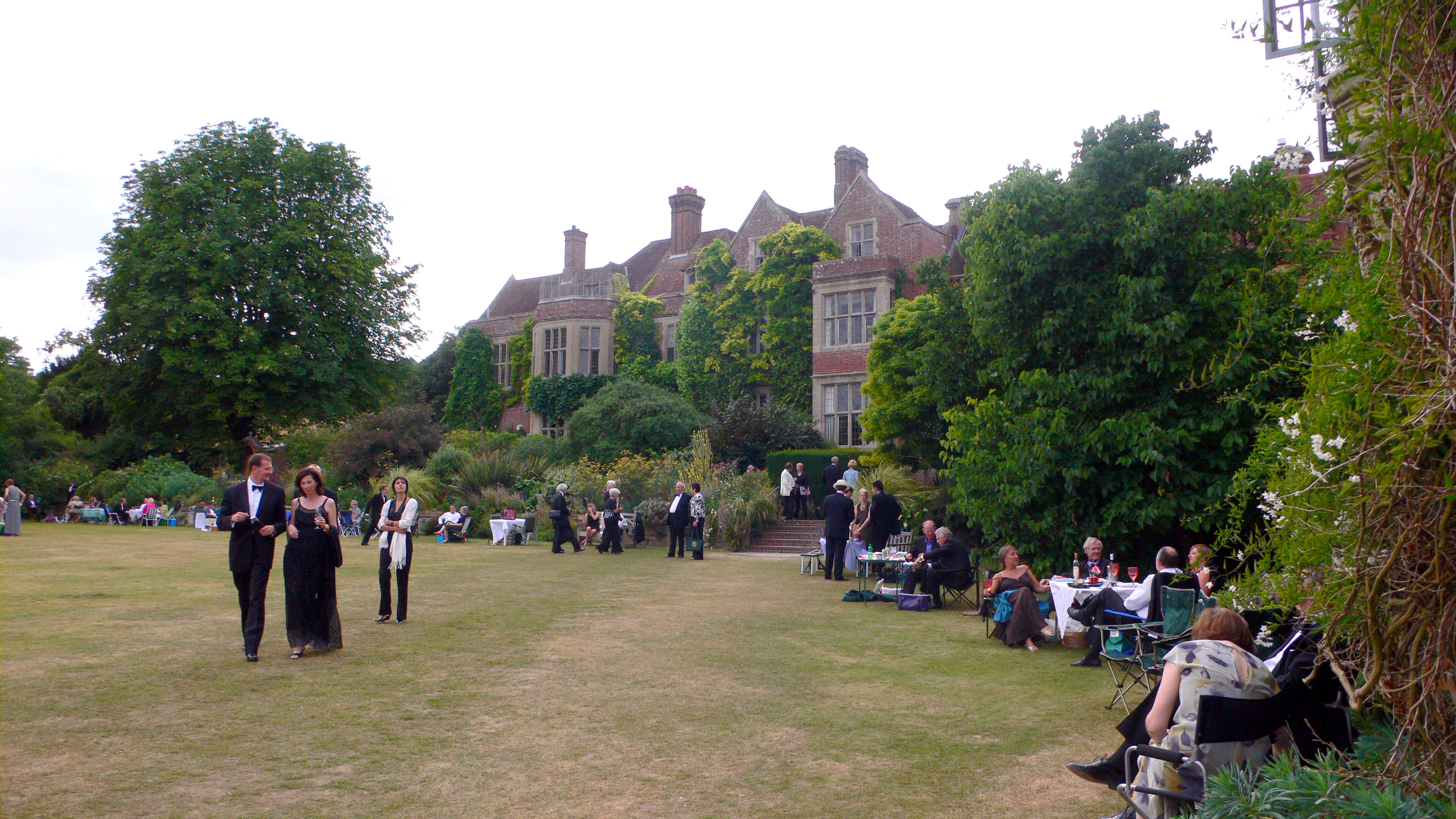
Glyndebourne, where the LPO took over as resident orchestra in 1964

In 1962, the LPO undertook its first tour of India, Australia, and the Far East. The conductors were Sargent and John Pritchard. The latter was appointed the LPO's chief conductor in 1962, presiding over what one player described as "an era of supremely good taste". From its outset in 1932, harpists (traditionally female) excepted, the orchestra had maintained Beecham's "men only" regime; in 1963 the rule was dropped, the first woman violinist was recruited, and within two years female players achieved equal conditions of membership with their male colleagues.

Pritchard was also music director of Glyndebourne Festival Opera in Sussex, and it was partly due to his influence that in 1964 the LPO replaced the RPO as Glyndebourne's resident orchestra, providing the players with stable guaranteed work in the slack summer months. The number of LPO concerts in the provinces fell during the 1960s, and ceased to be a major factor in the orchestra's finances. During the 1960s the orchestra gave fund-raising concerts in which guests from outside the world of classical music appeared, including Danny Kaye, Duke Ellington and Tony Bennett. Its regular complement at the end of the decade was 88 players.

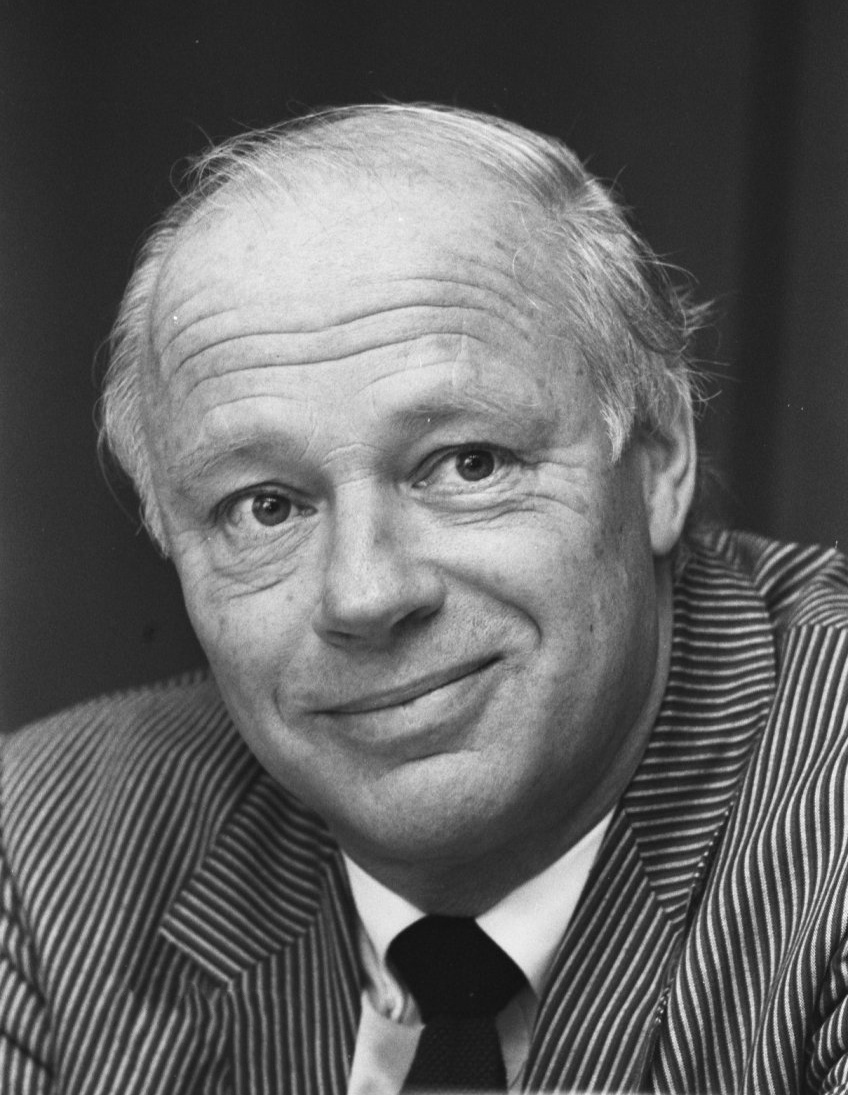
Bernard Haitink, principal conductor, 1967–79

In 1967, the LPO appointed Bernard Haitink as its principal conductor. He remained with the orchestra for twelve years, to date (2018) the longest tenure of the post. His concerts made a strong impression with the public, and within months the LPO was playing to ninety per cent capacity audiences at the Festival Hall, far outstripping the other London orchestras. Among the composers with whom Haitink was associated were Bruckner and Mahler, whose symphonies featured frequently in the LPO's concerts during the Haitink period, as did those of Shostakovich, particularly the Tenth, which Pirouet describes as the calling card of the orchestra and conductor. With Vladimir Ashkenazy, Haitink and the LPO gave a six-concert cycle of the Beethoven symphonies and piano concertos, for which the Festival Hall was full to capacity. In The Times, Joan Chissell described the orchestra's playing as "worthy of any festival". There was some discontent within the LPO that Haitink's prolific recordings were almost always with the other orchestra of which he was the chief conductor, the Amsterdam Concertgebouw. Pirouet comments that as Haitink recorded exclusively for the Dutch firm Philips it was to be expected that the Amsterdam orchestra would be preferred, and in any case the LPO was recording extensively with Boult, Solti, Daniel Barenboim and many others. In the 1970s international tours continued, with itineraries taking in the US, Western Europe, the Soviet Union, and, in 1972, China, long inaccessible to Western musicians, where the orchestra met an enthusiastic welcome.

In 1973, the LPO was caught up in a recurring phenomenon of London orchestral life: the conviction in official circles that having four independent orchestras is too much for one city, and that two or more of the existing ensembles should merge. On this occasion the targets were the LPO and the New Philharmonia; the latter, a self-governing body formed under its new name when the Philharmonia was disbanded in 1964, was going through a bad patch, professionally and financially. The proposed merger would inevitably have led to redundancies, and the player-owners of both orchestras rejected the plan.

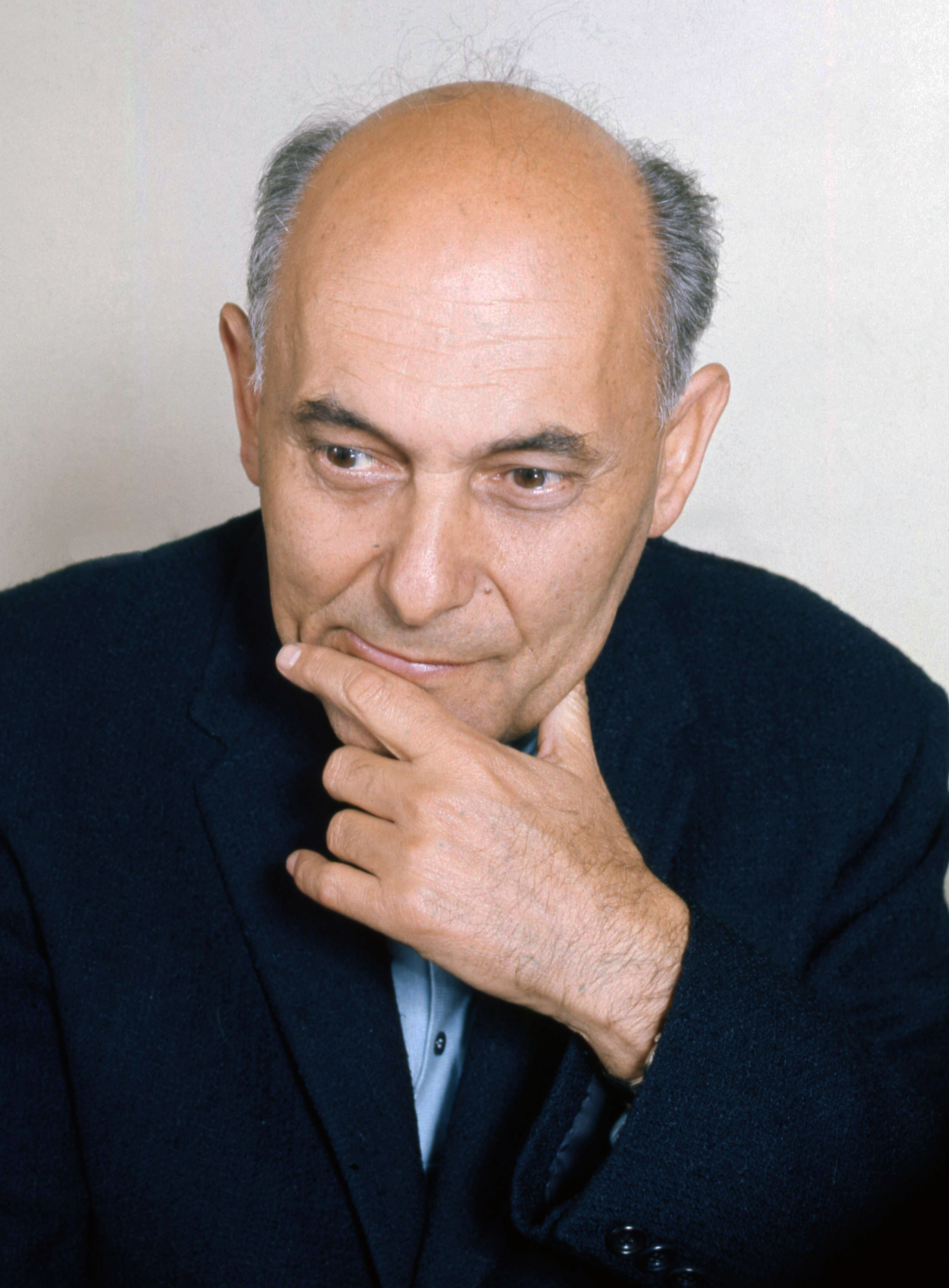
Sir Georg Solti, principal conductor, 1979–83

One of the constant difficulties of London orchestras was the lack of good rehearsal space and facilities. In 1973, acting jointly with the LSO, the LPO acquired and began restoring a disused church in Southwark, converting it into the Henry Wood Hall, a convenient and acoustically excellent rehearsal space and recording studio, opened in 1975.

Guest conductors in the 1970s included Erich Leinsdorf, Carlo Maria Giulini, Eugen Jochum, Riccardo Chailly, Klaus Tennstedt and Solti. When Haitink announced in 1977 that he would step down as principal conductor at the end of the 1978–79 season, Solti, who had been principal guest conductor since 1971, agreed to succeed him.

=== 1980s and 90s ===
In 1982, the orchestra celebrated its golden jubilee. (Note: A contemporaneous book listed the many famous soloists who had worked with the LPO in its fifty years. Among them were sopranos and mezzos such as Janet Baker, Victoria de los Ángeles, Kirsten Flagstad, Leontyne Price, Elisabeth Schumann, Joan Sutherland and Eva Turner, tenors including Beniamino Gigli, Luciano Pavarotti and Richard Tauber; the cellists Pablo Casals and Jacqueline du Pré; the violinists Jascha Heifetz, Fritz Kreisler and David Oistrakh, and the pianists Alfred Brendel, Clifford Curzon, Wilhelm Kempff, Arturo Benedetti Michelangeli, Maurizio Pollini and Arthur Rubinstein.) At the anniversary concert Solti conducted the programme with which Beecham had inaugurated the LPO. Pirouet comments that with the exception of Delius's Brigg Fair, the music was as ideally suited to Solti's musical persona as to Beecham's. In The Guardian, Edward Greenfield wrote, "I doubt if the LPO has ever played so beautifully, even in the days of Beecham".

Solti stepped down at the end of the jubilee season, and was succeeded by Klaus Tennstedt, of whom The Times commented, "Tennstedt found the orchestra sensitive and flexible, and his players regarded him with a warmth that is by no means universally extended by musicians to their conductors". His time as chief conductor (1983–87) was celebrated for its musical achievements, but was marked by his failing health and frequent cancellations. As with Haitink and Solti, Bruckner and Mahler were prominent in the LPO's concerts with Tennstedt. Unlike his two predecessors Tennstedt preferred to record with the LPO rather than major continental or American orchestras; among the many sets they made together was a complete cycle of Mahler's symphonies for EMI. In 1984 the LPO and the Philharmonia (Note: The New Philharmonia had bought back the rights to the original title in 1977.) began negotiations that went on for years following an Arts Council proposal to name one London orchestra as the principal resident orchestra of the Festival Hall, with concomitant extra funding. The two orchestras were interested in making a counter-proposal for a joint residency, but the matter was not resolved until 1995 when their plan was finally implemented. From the outset of the LPO's existence as a self-governing co-operative in 1939, its chief executive had always been appointed from within the orchestra's ranks. In 1985 this tradition was broken with the recruitment of John Willan, a qualified accountant as well as an alumnus of the Royal Academy of Music and a successful recording producer for EMI.

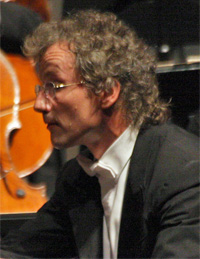
Franz Welser-Möst, principal conductor, 1990–96

In August 1987 Tennstedt, taken ill at a rehearsal, felt so unequal to continuing in his post that he resigned on the spot. He continued to appear with the LPO as a guest, with the title of "conductor laureate"; in 1989 Richard Morrison of The Times wrote that the LPO still played better for Tennstedt than for anyone else. Tennstedt's resignation was a severe blow to the orchestra, and there was no obvious successor: Morrison observed that the best-known conductors – Barenboim, Riccardo Muti and Simon Rattle – with whom the orchestra was then associated were committed to other projects until the 1990s, and those possible contenders such as Semyon Bychkov and Franz Welser-Möst were largely unknown in London. No successor was appointed until 1990 when Welser-Möst was named as the new principal conductor. His tenure was controversial; he received the nickname "Frankly Worse than Most" and many harshly critical reviews. He brought with him a recording contract with EMI, but management turnover, financial stresses, and political disputes at the Southbank Centre at the time contributed to the difficulty of the working atmosphere in the orchestra. There were complaints that the orchestra's high standards of playing were not consistently maintained.

Welser-Möst's period as principal conductor coincided with the installation of the LPO as the sole resident orchestra of the Festival Hall. This proved a mixed blessing: the Southbank Centre management now had a say over concert programming, and insisted on the inclusion of works by obscure composers (Note: Pirouet singles out Nikolai Roslavets as the most extreme example.) which did severe damage to box-office receipts. In 1993 another official attempt to create a "super-orchestra" at the expense of one or more of the existing London ensembles briefly damaged relations between the LPO and the Philharmonia, but the idea was quickly abandoned, and in 1995, with the consent of the Arts Council, the two orchestras agreed to share the residency at the Festival Hall.

In 1993, with the government of South Africa now moving towards majority rule, the orchestra accepted an invitation to tour there. Welser-Möst concluded his LPO tenure in 1996, after what The Guardian called "a fraught few years in which the high hopes placed in him were somehow not fulfilled."

=== 21st century ===
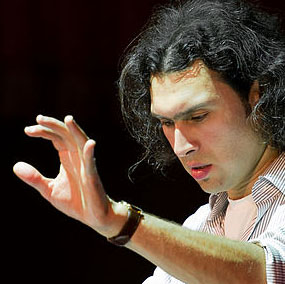
Vladimir Jurowski, principal conductor from 2007 to 2021

After the departure of Welser-Möst, the LPO was without a principal conductor for four years. During the interregnum, the orchestra inaugurated its "Roots Classical Fusions" series, which aimed to combine musical traditions from around the world; this was part of an education and community programme launched by the orchestra. Kurt Masur was the LPO's principal conductor from 2000 to 2007. Under Masur, known for his performances of the German symphonic repertoire, the orchestra regained its musical form, and the critic Richard S Ginell commented that Vladimir Jurowski, who took over in 2007 "has inherited an LPO in splendid technical shape, probably having been drilled to a fare-thee-well under Masur".

In 2000, the LPO performed Beethoven's Ninth Symphony under Gilbert Levine, joining the Berlin Philharmonic under Bernard Haitink, the New York Philharmonic under Kurt Masur, and the Concentus Musicus Wien under Nikolaus Harnoncourt, in a gala series of concerts celebrating the reign of Krakow as the European Cultural Capital in the Millennium Year. The concert was broadcast internationally including on PBS marking the orchestra's television debut in the United States.

Jurowski had first conducted the LPO at the Royal Festival Hall in December 2001, as an emergency substitute for Yuri Temirkanov. Jurowski became principal guest conductor in 2003, and conducted the orchestra in June 2007 during the concerts marking the re-opening of the refurbished Festival Hall. In September 2007, Jurowski became the LPO's eleventh principal conductor. Like his LPO predecessors Pritchard and Haitink, Jurowski also served as music director of Glyndebourne (2001–2013), where he conducted the LPO there in operas by Britten, Mozart, Puccini, Richard Strauss, Verdi, Wagner, and others. During Jurowski's LPO tenure, principal guest conductors of the LPO have included Yannick Nézet-Séguin and Andrés Orozco-Estrada. David Burke joined the LPO in 2009 as its general manager, and became its chief executive in 2020. Jurowski concluded his LPO tenure at the close of the 2020-2021 season, and now has the title of conductor emeritus of the LPO.

In 2003, Edward Gardner first guest-conducted the LPO. In July 2019, the LPO announced the appointment of Gardner as its next principal conductor, effective with the 2021-2022 season, with an initial contract of five years. In October 2018, Karina Canellakis first guest-conducted the LPO. In April 2020, the LPO announced the appointment of Canellakis as its new principal guest conductor, the first female conductor ever named to the post, effective from September 2020. In February 2024, the LPO announced the extension of Canellakis' contract as principal guest conductor for an additional three years. In September 2024, the LPO announced the extension of Gardner's contract as principal conductor for an additional two years. Gardner is scheduled to conclude his tenure as principal conductor of the LPO at the close of the 2027-2028 season.

In March 2026, the LPO announced the appointment of Paavo Järvi as its next chief conductor and artistic advisor, effective with the 2028-2029 season, with an initial contract of five seasons. In June 2026, the LPO announced the extension of Canellakis' contract as principal guest conductor through the close of the 2029–2030 season.. Also in June 2026, the LPO announced that Burke is to stand down as its chief executive at the close of 2026.

== Recordings ==
In its early years, the LPO recorded exclusively for Columbia, a division of EMI. The orchestra's first gramophone set was made before its debut concert; with Sargent and the Royal Choral Society the LPO recorded choruses from Messiah and The Creation at Kingsway Hall in September 1932. The first Abbey Road recording was in October, under Sir Henry Wood. Beecham's first discs with the orchestra were made in January 1933, with his ballet suite The Origin of Design, arranged from music by Handel. From then until his last LPO recording in December 1945 Beecham recorded ninety-nine 78-rpm sets with the orchestra. Other conductors who worked in the EMI studios with the orchestra in its early years included Elgar, Felix Weingartner, John Barbirolli, and Serge Koussevitzky. Soloists in concerto recordings included the pianists Artur Schnabel and Alfred Cortot and the violinists Fritz Kreisler and Jascha Heifetz.

In 1946, the orchestra began recording for Decca, EMI's rival. The LPO's first recording for the label, Stravinsky's Petrushka, conducted by Ernest Ansermet, was followed by a large number of sessions as the company rebuilt its catalogue after the war. Among those who recorded with the orchestra for Decca were van Beinum, Sargent, de Sabata, Furtwängler, Charles Munch, Clemens Krauss, Hans Knappertsbusch, Erich Kleiber and the young Solti. The orchestra's first stereophonic recording was made for Decca in 1956, with Boult in Vaughan Williams's Eighth Symphony.

Unlike its London rivals, the RPO and the Philharmonia (both of whom recorded for many years only for EMI and its associates, with the rarest of exceptions), the post-war LPO was not exclusively associated with one company, and as well as Decca it recorded for Philips, CBS, RCA, Chandos and many other labels. For some years in the 1950s and 1960s the orchestra was contracted to two companies at once, and consequently appeared under the name "the Philharmonic Promenade Orchestra" in some of its recordings. In the 1960s and 1970s the orchestra was particularly associated with Lyrita, an independent company specialising in neglected British repertoire. In most LPO recordings for Lyrita the conductor was Boult; in the same period he also recorded extensively for EMI, with the LPO his preferred orchestra.

The LPO plays on many opera recordings, some taped live at Glyndebourne and the Festival Hall and others in the studios of Decca and EMI. They range from early works such as Cavalli's L'Ormindo (recorded 1968) and Glydebourne's staging of Handel's Theodora (1996) to central repertoire such as Così fan tutte (1974), Carmen (1975 and 2002) and Die Meistersinger (2011), and première recordings of 20th-century works including Vaughan Williams's The Pilgrim's Progress (1972), Shostakovich's Lady Macbeth of Mtsensk (1979) and Eötvös's Love and Other Demons (2008).

In a discography of the LPO published in 1997, Philip Stuart listed 280 recordings made at Kingsway Hall and 353 at Abbey Road. By the early 2000s the late 20th-century boom in classical recordings had ended, and with studio work in decline for all orchestras, the LPO set up its own CD label in 2005, featuring recordings taken mainly from live concerts. With the exception of Steinberg, all the orchestra's principal conductors from Beecham to Jurowski are represented in the label's releases. The orchestra lists among its best-selling recordings Mahler's Eighth Symphony, conducted by Tennstedt, and works by Rachmaninoff and Tchaikovsky with Jurowski.

=== Film scores and other non-classical recordings ===
Although not rivalling the LSO's total of more than 200 film score recordings, the LPO has played for a number of soundtracks, starting in 1936 with Whom the Gods Love. The orchestra played for ten films made during the Second World War, and then did little soundtrack work until the 1970s, with the major exception of Lawrence of Arabia (1962). Later scores have included those for Antony and Cleopatra (1972), Jesus Christ Superstar (1973), Disney's Tron (1982), The Fly (1986), Dead Ringers (1988), In the Name of the Father (1993), the Lord of the Rings trilogy (2001–03) and most of the music for the three films derived from The Hobbit (2012–14). In 2013, the LPO recorded several new arrangements of rock songs by Japanese rock star Yoshiki on his studio album Yoshiki Classical.

The orchestra has made many non-classical recordings, including such titles as Hawaiian Paradise (1959), Evita (1976), Broadway Gold (1978), Folk Music of the Region of Asturias (1984), Academy Award Themes (1984), Japanese Light Music (1993), The Symphonic Music of Pink Floyd (1994) , The Symphonic Music of The Who (1995). and an ongoing collaboration with symphonic metal band Nightwish since 2004. In May 2011 the orchestra recorded the 205 national anthems to be used at medal ceremonies at the Olympic and Paralympic Games in London the following year. The LPO performed a version of "Move Closer to Your World" by WPVI-TV for a brief period in 1996.

== Sources ==
- Aldous, Richard (2001). Tunes of Glory – The Life of Malcolm Sargent. London, England: Hutchinson. ISBN 0091801311.
- Elkin, Robert (1944). Queen's Hall, 1893–1941. London, England: Rider. OCLC 636583612.
- Hill, Ralph, ed. (1951). Music 1951. Harmondsworth, England: Penguin Books. OCLC 26147349.
- Jenkins, Lyndon (2005). While Spring and Summer Sang – Thomas Beecham and the Music of Frederick Delius. Aldershot: Ashgate. ISBN 0754607216.
- Kennedy, Michael (1987). Adrian Boult. London, England: Hamish Hamilton. ISBN 0333487524.
- Kenyon, Nicholas (1981). The BBC Symphony Orchestra, 1930–1980. London, England: British Broadcasting Corporation. ISBN 0563176172.
- Lucas, John (2008). Thomas Beecham – An Obsession with Music. Woodbridge: Boydell Press. ISBN 9781843834021.
- Moore, Jerrold Northrop (1982). Philharmonic – Jubilee 1932–1982. London, England: Hutchinson. ISBN 0091473004.
- Morrison, Richard (2004). Orchestra –The LSO: A Century of Triumph and Turbulence. London, England: Faber and Faber. ISBN 057121584X.
- Peacock, Alan (chairman) (1970). Report on Orchestral Resources in Great Britain. London, England: Arts Council of Great Britain. ISBN 011981062X.
- Pirouet, Edmund (1998). Heard Melodies are Sweet – A History of the London Philharmonic Orchestra. Hove: Book Guild. ISBN 1857763815.
- Reid, Charles (1968). Malcolm Sargent – A Biography. London: Hamish Hamilton. ISBN 0800850807.
- Reid, Charles (1961). Thomas Beecham – An Independent Biography. London, England: Victor Gollancz. OCLC 500565141.
- Sackville-West, Edward; Shawe-Taylor, Desmond (1955). The Record Guide. London, England: Collins. OCLC 474839729.
- Simeone, Nigel; Mundy, Simon (1980). Sir Adrian Boult – Companion of Honour. London, England: Midas Books. ISBN 0859362124.
- Stuart, Philip (1997). The London Philharmonic discography. Westport, CT: Greenwood Press. ISBN 0313291365.
- Watt, Laurie (2025). My Other Family. Los Angeles: Book Publishing Pros. ISBN 978-1-917613-78-1.
