= Paolo Grancino =

Italian luthier

Paolo Grancino is a 17th-century violin maker of obscure origin and unverifiable existence. He is thought to have been a student of Andrea Guarneri. Instruments which appear to have been made by him are of a recognizable "Grancino" style which also appears in the work of later Grancinos, yet his instruments are of an earlier date (1680 to 1730) and more delicate style than the well known work of Giovanni Grancino. These instruments have a fine oil varnish and a character, which is clearly related to that of Andrea Guarneri. They are often labeled or attributed to one or another of the well known Cremonese makers.
