= Henry Holst =

Danish violinist (1899–1991)

Henry Holst (25 July 1899 – 19 October 1991) was a Danish violinist. In his early career he was leader of the Berlin Philharmonic Orchestra under Wilhelm Furtwängler. From the 1930s to the mid-1950s he was based in England, as a soloist and teacher. From 1940 until 1944 he was the leader of the Liverpool Philharmonic Orchestra. He held professorships at the Royal Manchester College of Music and the Royal College of Music in London. After 1954 he was based in his native Denmark, where he was professor of violin at the Royal Danish Academy of Music.

== Life and career ==
Holst was born in Sæby, Denmark, the son of Jens Christian Holst (1856–1907) and Elvira Kath Inga Alexandra, née Jakobsen (1864–1943). Holst senior was a schoolmaster and organist, and the household was a highly musical one. In 1913 Holst was admitted to the Royal Danish Academy of Music where he studied the violin with Axel Gade and the piano and harmony under Carl Nielsen. He made his concert debut at the age of 18 playing Vieuxtemps' first violin concerto and Brahms's first violin sonata. At Gade's instigation he then studied for a year with Emil Telmányi. He moved to Berlin to study with Willy Hess.

In 1921 Holst attracted favourable notice when he played three concertos at one concert with the Berlin Philharmonic Orchestra. Two years later, when the post of leader of the orchestra became vacant, Holst won the open competition to fill it. He remained with the orchestra for eight years, playing under Wilhelm Furtwängler and guest conductors including Bruno Walter and Willem Mengelberg.

Holst moved to England in 1931. He founded the Henry Holst String Quartet and took up the post of professor of violin at the Royal Manchester College of Music, a position once held by his former teacher, Hess. Holst was professor of violin at the RMCM from 1931 to 1946, and again from 1950 to 1954. Holst accepted invitations to play as a soloist with the Hallé and other orchestras. In a profile written in 1948 the author referred to:

that memorable occasion in 1933 when with the Hallé Orchestra under Sir Thomas Beecham, he gave one of the finest performances of the Sibelius Concerto we have ever been privileged to hear. Then there was the first European performance of the Walton Concerto in 1941, which he gave with the Royal Philharmonic Society. This concerto, by the way, he has now played over twenty-five times.

In addition to his work as a soloist and teacher, Holst led the Philharmonia Quartet, which was formed in 1941 to make recordings for Columbia. In 1945 he moved from Manchester to London to take up a professorship at the Royal College of Music.

In December 1950, at the Royal Albert Hall in London, he gave the first performance in Great Britain of Bohuslav Martinů’s second violin concerto with the London Symphony Orchestra, conducted by Richard Austin.

In 1954 Holst moved back to Denmark, taking over the violin class at his alma mater, the Royal Danish Academy of Music. From 1961 to 1963 he gave masterclasses at the National University of Fine Arts and Music in Tokyo.

Holst married Else Werner of Copenhagen in 1926. They had two daughters. Holst died in Copenhagen at the age of 92.
