= String Quartet No. 17 (Mozart) =

1784 composition by W. A. Mozart

- The Hunt
- by W. A. Mozart
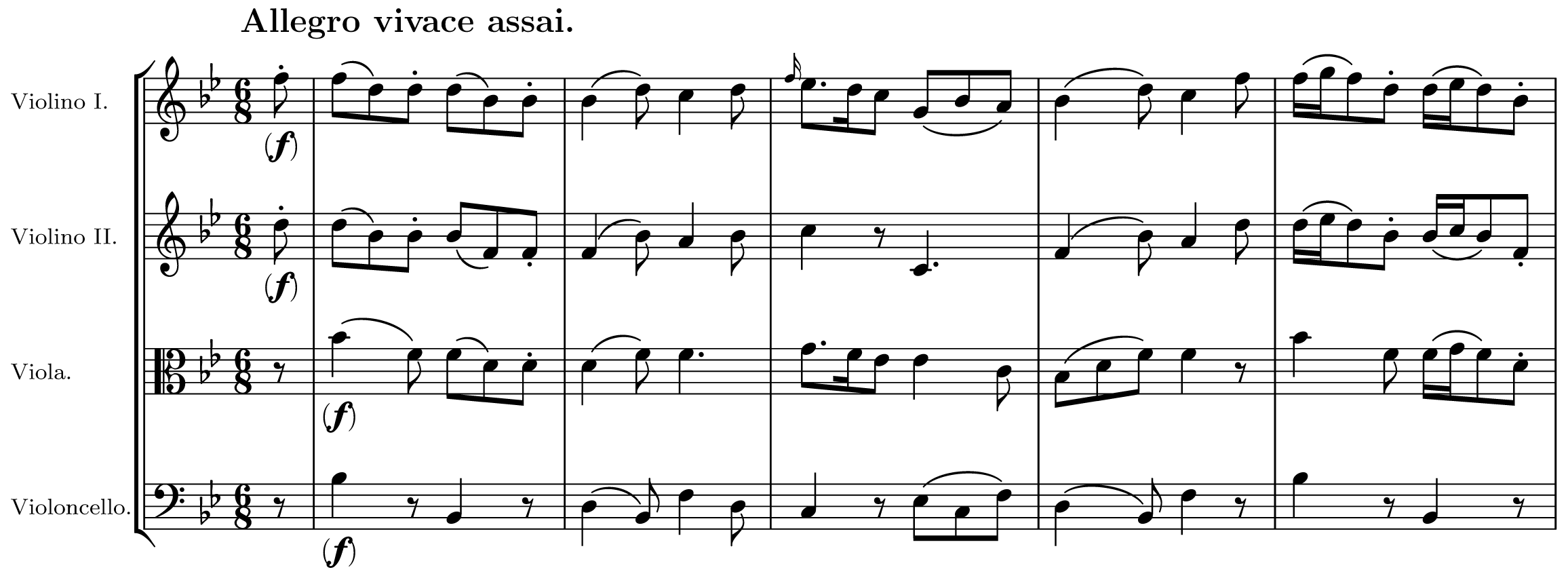
- The opening five measures of the first movement
- Key: B♭ major
- Catalogue: K. 458
- Composed: 1784
- Dedication: Joseph Haydn
- Publisher: Artaria
- Movements: 4
- Scoring: 2 violins; viola; cello

Wolfgang Amadeus Mozart's String Quartet No. 17 in B♭ major, K. 458, nicknamed "The Hunt", is the fourth of the quartets dedicated to Haydn. It was completed in 1784. It is in four movements:

1. Allegro vivace assai
2. Menuetto and Trio. Moderato
3. Adagio, in E♭ major
4. Allegro assai

II. Menuetto – Moderato

III. Adagio
Performed by Budapest String Quartet in 1926

Neither Mozart nor Artaria (the publisher) called this piece "The Hunt". "For Mozart's contemporaries, the first movement of K.458 evidently evoked the 'chasse' topic, the main components of which were a 6/8 time signature (sometimes featuring a strong upbeat) and triadic melodies based largely around tonic and dominant chords (doubtless stemming from the physical limitations of the actual hunting horns to notes of the harmonic series)." According to Irving, Mozart's first intention was to conclude with a polonaise and sketched 65 bars (p. 17).
