= Axel Gade =

Danish violinist, composer, and conductor

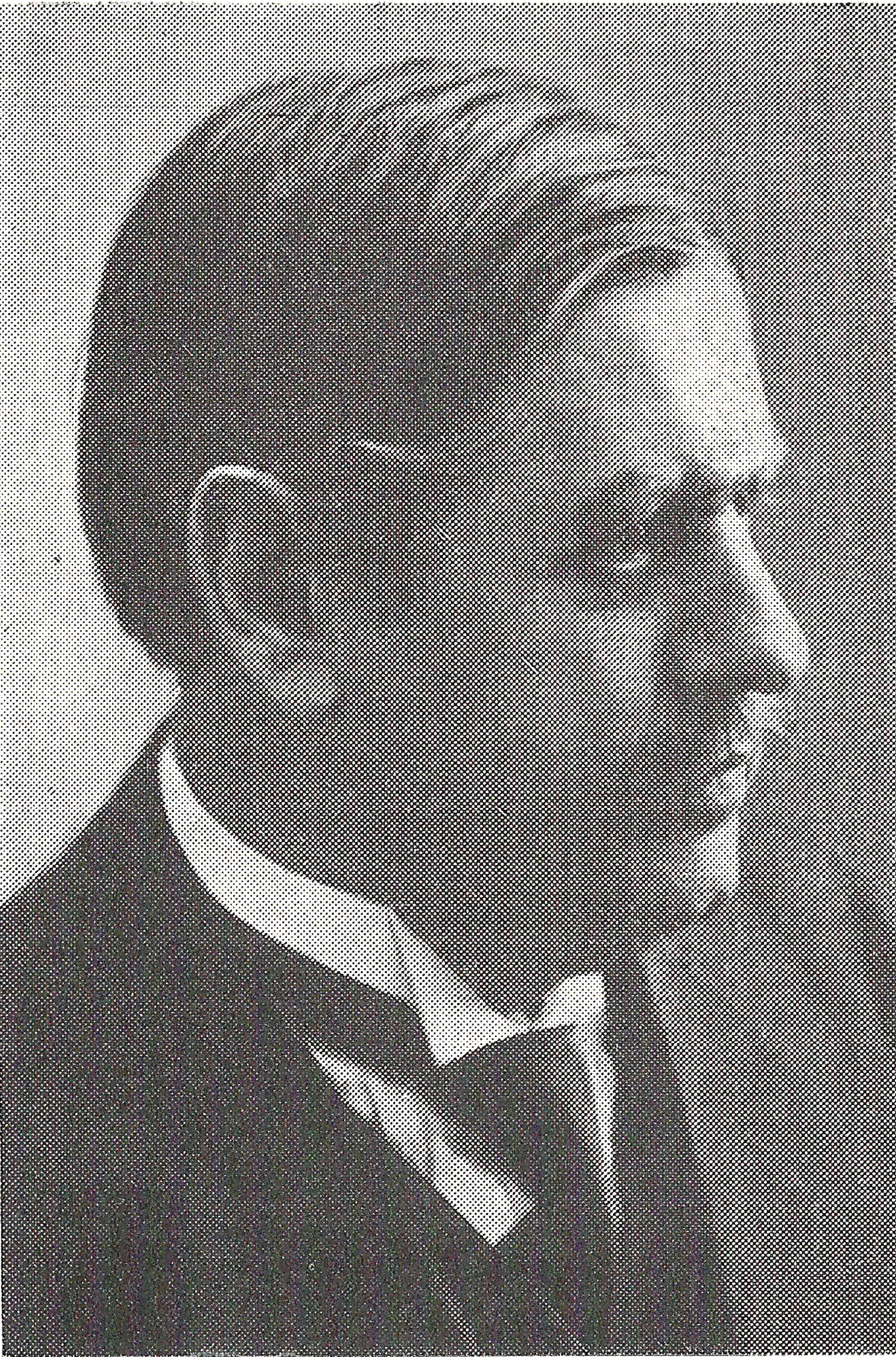

Axel Gade (28 May 1860 – 9 November 1921) was a Danish violinist, composer, and conductor. He was the son of Niels Wilhelm Gade.

== Notable works ==
- Violin concerto No. 1 in D minor (1889)
- Violin concerto Op. 10, No. 2 in F major (1899)
- Venezias Nat (opera 1919)
- Lisette (opera 1921)
- Trio in c minor for piano, violin and cello
- Sonata in G major for piano and violin
- David's 23rd psalm
- music for oboe
- some songs

== See also ==
- List of Danish composers

== Sources ==
- This article was initially translated from the Danish Wikipedia.
