= Paul Wiancko =

American cellist and composer (born 1983)

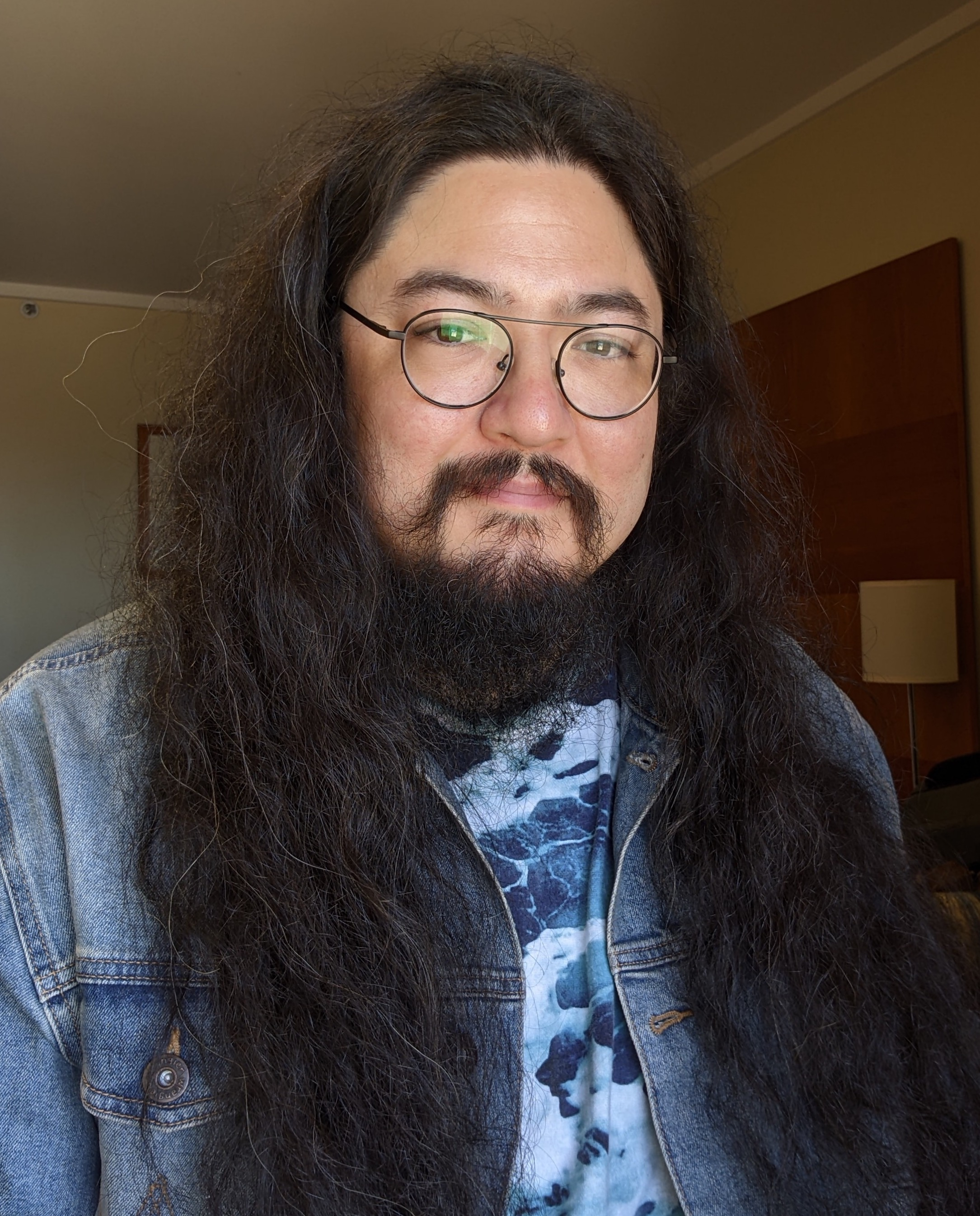
- Paul Wiancko in Adelaide, 2023

Background information
- Born: 1983 (age 42–43); San Clemente, California, U.S.
- Genres: classical; experimental; avant-garde; new music; jazz; indie; postminimalism
- Occupations: Composer, cellist
- Years active: 1988–present
- Member of: Kronos Quartet, Owls, Ayane & Paul
- Formerly of: Harlem Quartet
- Website: paulwiancko.com

Paul Wiancko (born 1983) is an American composer and cellist who performs with the Kronos Quartet.

== Early life and education ==
Paul Kenji Wiancko was born in San Clemente, California. He began playing the cello at age 5 and composed his first piece at age 8. After high school, he moved to Los Angeles to freelance while earning cello performance degrees with Ronald Leonard from the University of Southern California and the Colburn School. While in school, Wiancko converted his dormitory room into a production studio, where he arranged and recorded strings for bands like Yellowcard and Veruca Salt. From 2009 to 2011, Wiancko attended the Marlboro Music Festival where he performed with Richard Goode, Mitsuko Uchida, and members of the Juilliard and Guarneri Quartets.

== Career ==
Wiancko came to international attention in 2007 when he tied for 2nd Prize in the Lutoslawski International Cello Competition, which led to his playing the Witold Lutosławski Cello concerto with the Polish National Radio Symphony Orchestra. In 2009, Wiancko moved to New York City and shortly thereafter joined the Harlem Quartet, with whom he performed for three years. During that time, Wiancko toured extensively with Chick Corea, and appears on Corea's albums The Continents and Hot House, the latter of which won a Grammy in 2013. Wiancko also performed with Etta James at the Hollywood Bowl and Stanley Clarke at the Montreal Jazz Festival.

From 2009 to 2023, Wiancko appeared as guest cellist with Eighth Blackbird, Mark Morris Dance Group, Metropolis Ensemble, TAK ensemble, Roomful of Teeth, Parker Quartet, NOVUS NY, and East Coast Chamber Orchestra. Wiancko is a member of the American Contemporary Music Ensemble, and has collaborated extensively with Jóhann Jóhannsson and Max Richter, including giving the North American premiere of Richter's Sleep at SXSW in 2018.

In 2011, Wiancko founded Big Purple Box, a recording studio in Brooklyn, New York, where he arranged and recorded strings for numerous artists, including Norah Jones and Wye Oak.

In October 2023, Wiancko was named Spoleto Festival USA's next Charles E. and Andrea L. Volpe Director of Chamber Music, debuting in the role in the 2024 season. Wiancko's appointment marks the first time in the Festival's history that the standing director is both a performer and composer.

=== Owls ===
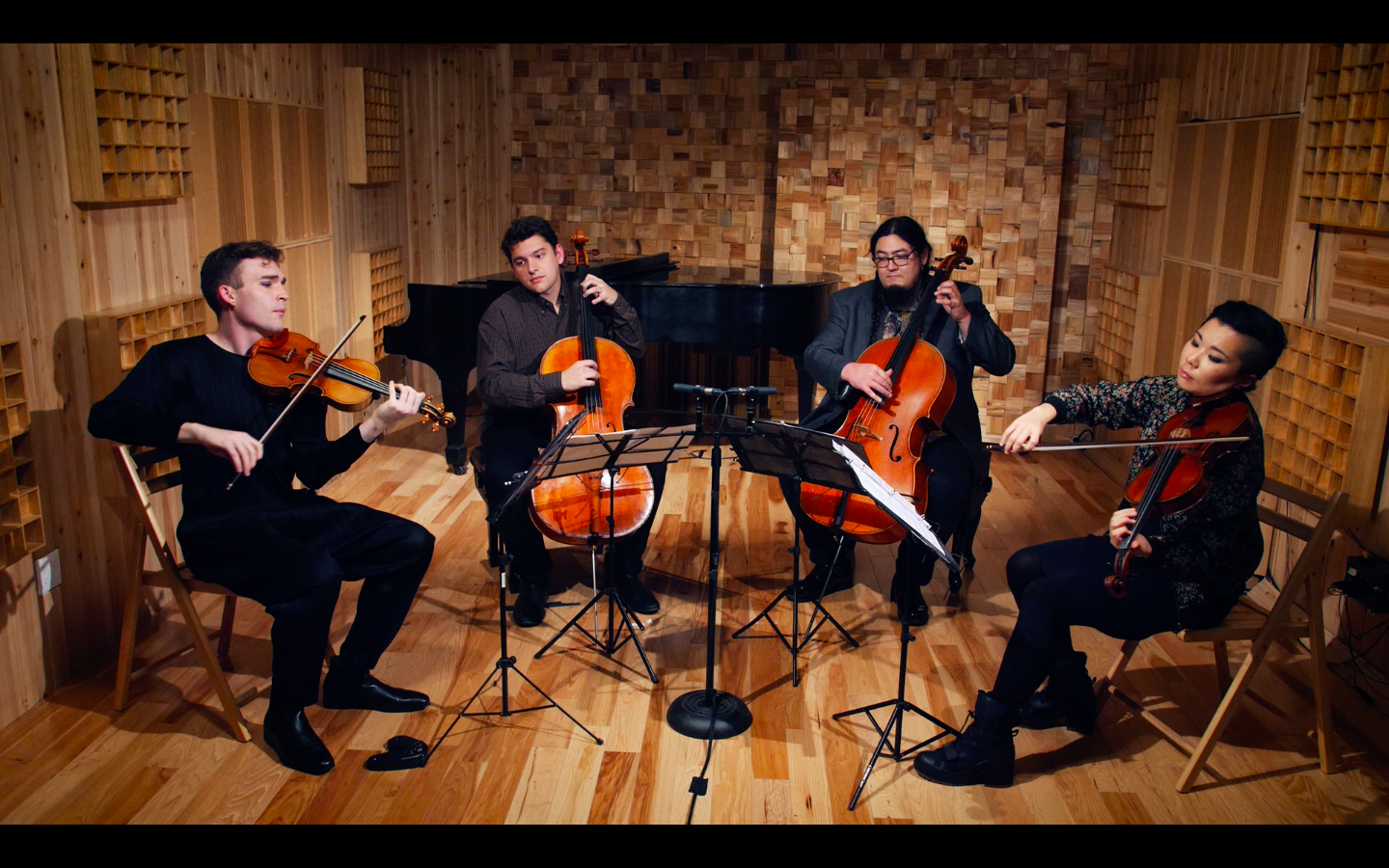
Owls recording in New York City, 2021

In 2019, Wiancko—along with violinist Alexi Kenney, violist Ayane Kozasa, and cellist Gabriel Cabezas—founded Owls, a quartet-collective described as a "dream group" by The New York Times and noted for its "unusual" make up, consisting of two cellists instead of two violinists.

=== Kronos Quartet ===
In 2023, Paul Wiancko became the newest member of the Kronos Quartet, succeeding cellist Sunny Yang. Kronos' Artistic Director David Harrington stated of the transition, "We look forward to soaring into the future with the catalytic, super-charged vitality of Paul’s playing. It will be so much fun to explore the vast world of music together with Paul." Wiancko first collaborated with the quartet in 2018, when Kronos commissioned Wiancko to compose a work for their 50 for the Future initiative. From 2019 to 2020, Wiancko served as Kronos' guest cellist during Yang's maternity leave.

== Composition ==
In 2013, the Parker Quartet commissioned Wiancko's first concert work, Strange Beloved Land. Wiancko has since composed works for the Kronos Quartet, St. Lawrence String Quartet, Aizuri Quartet, Attacca Quartet, Calder Quartet, Susanna Phillips, Alisa Weilerstein, Ayane Kozasa, yMusic, Alexi Kenney, and others. In 2016, Wiancko composed the score for the crime drama feature film Heartlock, as well as a Mars exploration-based work for solo piano commissioned by scientist and NASA project leader Peter Smith.

Wiancko has been composer-in-residence at Spoleto Festival USA, Music from Angel Fire, Twickenham Fest, Portland Chamber Music Festival, Newburyport Chamber Music Festival, Caramoor Center for Music and the Arts, and the Methow Valley Chamber Music Festival. In 2018, Wiancko received the S&R Foundation Washington Award for his work as a composer. In 2022, he was named one of The Washington Post's "22 for '22: Composers and Performers to Watch."
