= Yehuda Gilad =

Yehuda Gilad may refer to:

- Yehuda Gilad (musician), American professor of the clarinet
- Yehuda Gilad (politician), Israeli rabbi and politician
