= Carl Flesch International Violin Competition =

The Carl Flesch International Violin Competition (also known as the International Competition for Violinists "Carl Flesch" and the City of London International Competition for Violin and Viola (Carl Flesch Medal)) was an international music competition for violinists, and later viola players, held between 1945 and 1992 in London. Founded in honour of the Hungarian violinist Carl Flesch, it was originally organised by the Guildhall School of Music and Drama and after 1968 formed part of the City of London Festival. Particularly in the City of London Festival era, it was regarded as among the "most prestigious" competitions for string players, and "one of the most important testing grounds for aspiring soloists up to the age of 32."

== History ==
The competition was founded in 1945 in honour of the Hungarian violinist Carl Flesch (1873–1944), who was particularly noted as a violin teacher. It was founded in the form of the "Flesch Medal" by Max Rostal and Edric Cundell of the Guildhall School of Music and Drama; Rostal had been a pupil of Flesch. Flesch's son, Carl F. Flesch, was also instrumental in the competition's foundation, and commissioned a commemorative medal portraying his father from Benno Elkan to be presented to the winners. The early competitions were organised by the Guildhall School. Initially they were held annually in October, around the date of Flesch's birthday. From the start they were open to international entrants, with an age cut-off of thirty years. In addition to the medal, the original prize included a concert as a soloist with the London Philharmonic Orchestra. The first competition was won by the British violinist Raymond Cohen; his win was said to have "launched him on to the world stage".

At that date there were relatively few international music competitions; a slightly earlier violin competition is the French Marguerite Long–Jacques Thibaud Competition, which was founded in 1943 but did not attract international competitors until 1946. After the Second World War, the number of competitions increased rapidly. In 1949, the Carl Flesch competition was described by The Musical Times as "the premier international award for violinists under thirty years of age". By 1956, three British orchestras offered solo concerts to the winners: the London Philharmonic, Liverpool Philharmonic and City of Birmingham Orchestra. By the 1960s the final was held at the Wigmore Hall in November.

In 1968, the Carl Flesch competition was one of three international music competitions hosted in England, with a global total of sixteen competitions judging solely instrumentalists. Egon Kraus, in a 1968 review of international music competitions, commented that English violinists had been awarded eight of twelve prizes in the competition in 1956–66, including four overall winners, while considering all competitions Russian violinists performed much better. He noted that a similar skew towards the home nationality was apparent in the results of some other competitions.

In 1968, the competition joined the City of London Festival, an arts festival held in July, and the frequency changed to every two years. By then, the age limit had been raised to thirty-two years. In addition to the Carl Flesch Medal, a first prize of £1000 was offered, with a second prize of £750, third prize of £500 and fourth prize of £250. Yfrah Neaman, a pupil of both Flesch and Rostal, was the director and chair from 1968; he increased the competition's standing by recruiting Yehudi Menuhin and others to serve on the jury. It became a member of the World Federation of International Music Competitions in 1969. In 1970 the remit broadened to include viola players, with the first overall violist winner being Csaba Erdélyi in 1972. The formal title became the City of London International Competition for Violin and Viola (Carl Flesch Medal). According to Grove's, it was then "one of the most important testing grounds for aspiring soloists up to the age of 32." The music journalist Norman Lebrecht described it in 2002 as "one of the toughest violin contests".

From the 1970s specially composed test pieces were employed, which derived from a composers' competition organised by the Society for the Promotion of New Music; these include Michael Blake Watkins' The Wings of Night, Edward McGuire's Rant, Helen Roe's Notes towards a Definition and Michael Finnissy's Enek. An audience award began in 1972, and the total prize money increased during the 1970s and 1980s; in 1976, the first prize was worth £1250, with a second prize of £1000, third prize of £750, and three further prizes totalling £800. In 1988 and 1990, the winner received £5000 and the other awards (in 1990) came to £10,000. A gold-mounted bow was also awarded to the winner. In the 1980s and 1990s the finals were held in the Barbican Hall, with six finalists each performing a classical and a romantic or 20th-century concerto over several days in some years.

In 1992, the City of London ceased to fund the competition. Flesch tried unsuccessfully for many years to gather financial support to resurrect it, but the final competition was held that year. The loss of the Carl Flesch competition was described in 2003 by Malcolm Layfield, director of the strings department at the Royal Northern College of Music, as "a gap in the UK's contribution". It is not related to the competition in Hungary first held in 1985 under the title National Carl Flesch Violin Competition, and later as the Carl Flesh International Violin Competition.

=== Events ===
A partial list of individual competitions follows. For the winners, see the following section, which lists all the years in which the competition was held.

Year	Dates	Location	Judges	Competition details	Awards	Refs
1945	October	Guildhall School	Cundell, Rostal, Jean Pougnet, Albert Sammons		Medal	
1949	7 November	Guildhall School	Cundell, Rostal, Nicolai Malko, David Wise		Medal	
1950			Cundell, Rostal, Adrian Boult, Bernard Shore, Reginald S. Thatcher		Medal	
1951	November	Guildhall School	Cundell, Rostal, Leonard Isaacs, Frederick Riddle, Hugo Rignold	One runner up	Medal	
1953	10 November	Guildhall School	Cundell, Rostal, Frederick Grinke, Maurice Johnstone, Joseph Shadwick		Medal	
1954	2 November	Guildhall School	Cundell, Rostal, Paul Beard, Bernard Shore, Scott Goddard	Two runners up	Medal	
1955	8 November	Guildhall School	Cundell, Rostal, Arthur Benjamin, David Martin, Joseph Shadwick	One runner up	Medal	
1956	12–13 November	Guildhall School	Cundell, Antonio Brosa, Frederick Grinke, Seymour Whinyates, David Wise	One runner up	Medal	
1957	11–12 November	Guildhall School		Around 18 competitors	Medal	
1960	November			Repertoire Bach solo sonata and "standard violin concerto"		
1964	5 November	Final at Wigmore Hall				
1965	15 November	Final at Wigmore Hall				
1966	16 November	Wigmore Hall	Rostal, Adrian Boult, Manoug Parikian, Allen Percival, Ruth Railton			
1968	8–12 July				Medal, £1000 1st prize, three further prizes	
1972	9–14 July	Final in the Guildhall	Chaired by Yehudi Menuhin; included Luigi Dallapiccola	Finalists played with the BBC Training Orchestra conducted by Meredith Davies.	Medal, £1000 1st prize, Corporation of London (2nd) prize, four further prizes	
1974	25 June – 1 July			35 competitors from 19 countries	Medal, $2,300 1st prize; prizes for 2nd, 3rd and 4th places; Bach prize	
1976	9–15 July			Age limit 30 years	Medal, £1250 1st prize, £1000 2nd prize, £750 3rd prize; prizes for 4th, 5th, 6th places (£4300 total prize money)	
1978	20–27 July			Age limit 30 years	Medal, £6250 in prizes	
1980	10–17 July			Age limit 30 years	Medal, £3500 1st prize	
1982	7–15 July	Finals in the Barbican Hall		Age limit 27 or 28 years. Six finalists played a Beethoven or Brahms sonata, and one of the Beethoven, Brahms, Elgar or Mendelssohn concertos with the Royal Philharmonic Orchestra conducted by Charles Groves.	Medal, £4500 1st prize; other prizes including one for non-finalist	
1984	18–26 July			Age limit 30 years	Medal; £15,300 in prizes	
1986	Finals 15–17 July	Finals in the Barbican Hall		Six finalists played a Mozart concerto with the London Mozart Players conducted by Jane Glover, and one of the Beethoven, Berg, Brahms, Mendelssohn, Stravinsky and Tchaikovsky concertos with the Royal Philharmonic Orchestra conducted by James Loughran.		
1988	Finals 17–19 October	Finals in the Guildhall Old Library and Barbican Hall		Six finalists played a Mozart concerto with the City of London Sinfonia conducted by Richard Hickox, and one of the Bartók No. 2, Beethoven, Brahms, Mendelssohn, Sibelius and Tchaikovsky concertos with the Philharmonia Orchestra conducted by Louis Frémaux.	Medal, gold-mounted bow, £5000 1st prize	
1990	11–19 July	Early rounds in the Barber-Surgeon's Hall; finals in the Guildhall Old Library and Barbican Hall	Ida Haendel, Zakhar Bron, Herman Krebbers, Ricardo Odnoposoff, Cicash Tanaka, Berl Senofsky, Devy Erlih, Rodney Friend, Emanuel Hurwitz	Six finalists played a Mozart concerto with the City of London Sinfonia conducted by Richard Hickox, and one of the Bartók No. 2, Beethoven, Brahms, Mendelssohn, Tchaikovsky and Walton concertos with The Philharmonia conducted by Bryden Thomson.	Medal, gold-mounted bow, £5000 1st prize	
1992	Finals 15–16 July	Finals in the Barbican Hall				

== Winners ==
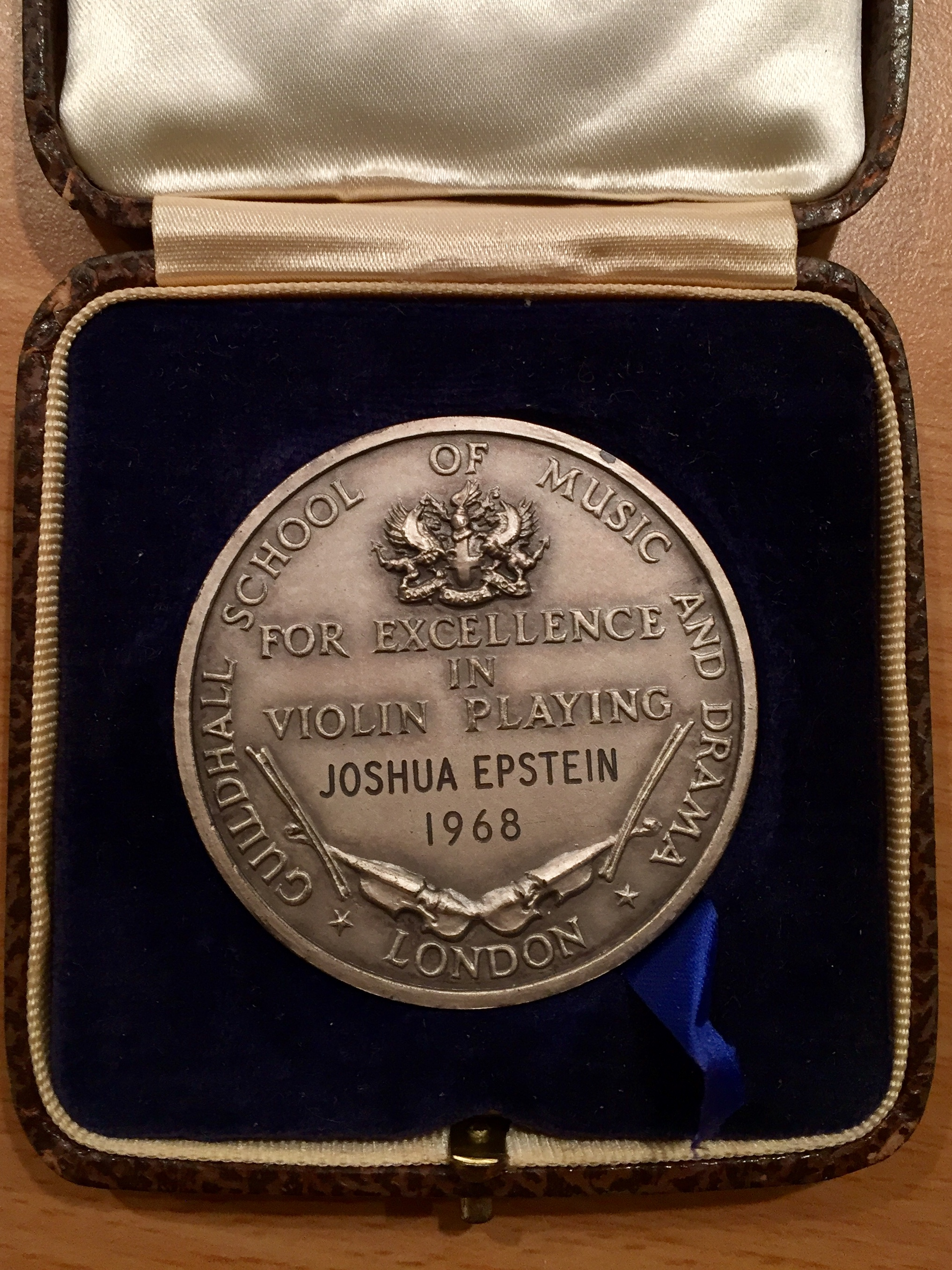
Carl Flesch Medal from 1968

A partial list of award winners in the competition; the instrument is violin unless otherwise stated:

- 1945: Raymond Cohen (UK)
- 1946: Norbert Brainin (Austria–UK)
- 1947: Erich Gruenberg (Austria)
- 1948: Gabriella Lengyel (Hungary)
- 1949: John Glickman
- 1950: Eugene Prokop (Czechoslovakia)
- 1951: Igor Ozim (Yugoslavia). Runner up: Hugh Bean (UK)
- 1952: Pierre Jetteur (Belgium). Runner up: Clarence Myerscough (UK)
- 1953: Betty-Jean Hagen (Canada)
- 1954: Maria Vischnia (Uruguay). Runners up: Jack Rothstein (Poland–UK), Trevor Williams (UK)
- 1955: Dénes Kovács (Hungary). Runner up: Agnes Vadas (Hungary)
- 1956: Ladislav Jasek (Czechoslovakia). Runner up: Steve Staryk (Canada)
- 1957: Michael Davis
- 1958: Wilfred Lehmann (Australia)
- 1959: Ronald Keith Thomas (Australia)
- 1960: Antoine Goulard (France)
- 1961: Marie Renaudie
- 1962: Jean-Jacques Kantorow (France)
- 1963: Ana Chumachenco (Italy)
- 1964: Eva Zurbrügg (Switzerland)
- 1965: Eszter Boda
- 1966: Andreas Röhn (Germany). Runners up: 2nd: Mariko Takagi (Japan); 3rd: Peter Michalica (Czechoslovakia); 4th: Hervé le Floch (France)
- 1968: Joshua Epstein (Israel)
- 1970: Stoika Milanova (Bulgaria). Runners up: 2nd: Luigi Bianchi (viola; Italy); 3rd: Csaba Erdélyi (viola; Hungary)
- 1972: Csaba Erdélyi (viola; Hungary), the first violist to win. Runners up: 2nd: Atar Arad (viola; Israel); 3rd: Gonçal Comellas (Spain); 4th: Mincho Minchev; 5th: Michael Bochmann (UK); 6th: Otto Armin (Canada). Audience award: Minchev or Comellas
- 1974: Mincho Minchev (Bulgaria). Runners up: 2nd: Dong-Suk Kang (Korea); 3rd: Isaac Shuldman (Israel); 4th: Gottfried Schneider (W. Germany); J. S. Bach prize: Elizabeth Wallfisch
- 1976: Dora Schwarzberg. Runners up: 2nd and Beethoven sonata prize: Andrew Watkinson; 3rd: Magdalena Rezler-Niesiolowska
- 1978: Eugene Sârbu (Romania). Runner up: 2nd: Takashi Shimizu (Japan)
- 1980: Barbara Górzyńska
- 1982: Adelina Oprean. Runners up: 2nd: Krzysztof Smietana; 3rd: Evgenia Popova; 4th: Michelle Makarski (United States); 5th: Kyoko Kimura; 6th: Takumi Kubota.
- 1984: Masayuki Kino (Japan)
- 1986: Xue Wei (China) Runner up: 3rd: Mieko Kanno
- 1988: Sungsic Yang (Korea) Runners up: 2nd and Mozart Prize: Suzy Whang; 3rd: Vasko Vassilev; Worshipful Company of Musicians Prize: Jean-Marc Phillips. Also a laureate: Vesko Eschkenazy (Bulgaria)
- 1990: Maxim Vengerov (Russia–Israel)
- 1992: Benjamin Schmid (Austria)

== See also ==
- List of classical music competitions
- Henryk Wieniawski Violin Competition
- Paganini Competition
