= Jose Gonzalez Granero =

Spanish clarinetist and composer (born 1985)

José González Granero (born February 11, 1985) is a Spanish clarinetist and composer. Since 2010, he is the Principal Clarinet for the San Francisco Opera.

== Early life and education ==
Granero was born in Iznatoraf, Spain to a family of musicians. His father, Pedro González, is the director of the local music band in Iznatoraf. When José was only 6 years old, his father taught him to play the Caja, which is similar to a Snare Drum. Then he learned to play the Saxophone at the Conservatorio Elemental de Música de Cazorla. Later on, he also studied Clarinet and Piano at the Conservatorio Profesional de Música de Jaén.

Granero completed undergraduate studies at the Granada Superior Conservatory (Spain) and the Milan Conservatory. In 2007, he moved to Los Angeles to attend the USC Thornton School of Music and the Colburn School for studies with Yehuda Gilad.

== Career ==
In 2010, Granero joined the San Francisco Opera as principal clarinetist. He was selected from over 249 applicants and 129 finalists. Following the 2011 season, he was offered tenure. Besides his participation with the Opera Orchestra, he has also been invited to perform in guest appearances with the San Francisco Ballet and the San Francisco Symphony. He has also performed as guest principal clarinet with the Norwegian Radio Orchestra, Odense Symphony Orchestra, Orquesta Sinfónica de Galicia and the City of Granada Orchestra among others.
