= Margaret Tracey =

American ballet dancer and educator (born 1967)

- Born: March 28, 1967 (age 59); Pueblo, Colorado, U.S.
- Education: School of American Ballet
- Occupations: ballet dancer; educator
- Spouse: Russell Kaiser (m. 1996)
- Children: 2
- Career
- Current group: Colburn School
- Former groups: New York City Ballet; Boston Ballet School

Margaret Tracey (born March 28, 1967) is an American ballet dancer and educator. She joined the New York City Ballet in 1986, was promoted principal dancer in 1991, and retired in 2002. She served as the director of the Boston Ballet School between 2007 and 2021, dean of the Colburn School's Trudl Zipper Dance Institute since 2023, and slated to become the artistic director of Canada's National Ballet School in 2024.

== Early life and training ==
Margaret Tracey was born on March 28, 1967, in Pueblo, Colorado, to a judge father and dance teacher mother. Her younger sister, Kathleen, would also be a New York City Ballet dancer. Tracey has two older brothers. She started dancing at a young age, trained by her mother and other local teachers. At age fourteen, she traveled to Denver to audition for Susan Hendl, for the School of American Ballet's summer program, and was soon offered a scholarship. She moved to New York and started the program in 1982, and remained in the school full-time. Her teachers include Stanley Williams and Suki Schorer. During her training, she had performed in the school workshop performances, dancing Bournonville's William Tell pas de deux and Konservatoriet. In New York, she also completed high school through Professional Children's School, and graduated in three years. She won a Princess Grace Award scholarship in 1985, and graduated from the School of American Ballet the following year.

== Career ==
Tracey joined the New York City Ballet in June 1986. Six months later, Peter Martins chose her to dance in his new ballet, Les Petits Riens. Soon, she was also spotted by Jerome Robbins, who cast her in Afternoon of a Faun and as the pink girl in The Goldberg Variations. In 1989, she won a Princess Grace Statue Award. She was named principal dancer in 1991.

She had lead roles in ballets by Balanchine, including "Rubies" from Jewels, Apollo, Symphony in C, Vienna Waltzes, Square Dance, Theme and Variations in Tschaikovsky Suite No. 3, (Note: At the New York City Ballet, the composer's last name is spelled "Tschaikovsky" rather than "Tchaikovsky" as he used the former spelling during a visit to New York in 1891.) Harlequinade, Western Symphony, Agon, Concerto Barocco, Scotch Symphony, and as Swanilda in Balanchine and Danilova's Coppélia. She also performed works by Robbins and Martins, and as Princess Aurora in The Sleeping Beauty. She also created roles in Robbins' Ives, Songs, Forsythe's Herman Schmerman, Martins' Zakouski, Fearful Symmetries, Les Petits Riens and Reliquary.

In 1996, she performed Balanchine's Sylvia pas de deux alongside Angel Corella for President Bill Clinton and First Lady Hillary Clinton, when former New York City Ballet principal dancer Maria Tallchief received a Kennedy Center Honor. Whilst an active dancer, she had also taught at School of American Ballet and Central Pennsylvania Youth Ballet.

In 2002, at age 34, Tracey retired from the New York City Ballet, as she intended to spend more time with her family. In her final performance, she performed Martins' Zakouski. The same night, she also replaced an injured Jenifer Ringer in Balanchine's Scotch Symphony. After she retired from performing, she joined the faculty of Ballet Academy West in New York.

In 2005, she was invited by Mikko Nissinen, the artistic director of the Boston Ballet to teach at the Boston Ballet School summer program. She returned the following year. In 2007, she became the director of the school. In her first year, she developed a syllabus for three levels of the elementary division of the classical ballet division. She also started the Next Generation Program, with professional division students working with a local youth orchestra and female and BIPOC choreographers. In fall 2020, the high school pre-professional programs of Boston Ballet School and Walnut Hill School merged, with Tracey becoming the latter's director of dance.

Tracey stepped down from the Boston Ballet School in 2021, with short-term plans to teach and consult on a freelance basis, focusing on curriculums and faculty development. Tracey served as the jury president of Prix de Lausanne in 2022.

In August 2023, Tracey became the dean of the Colburn School's Trudl Zipper Dance Institute. She is slated to become the artistic director of Canada's National Ballet School in 2024.

== Personal life ==
In 1996, Tracey married Russell Kaiser, a fellow New York City Ballet dancer. They have two children.
