= Robert Lipsett =

American violin teacher

Robert Crawford Lipsett Jr. (born October 23, 1947) is an American violin teacher in Los Angeles, California. He holds the Jascha Heifetz Distinguished Violin Chair at the Colburn School. He also serves on the faculty at the Aspen School of Music and previously taught at the USC Thornton School of Music. He has given master classes at major schools around the world.

Lipsett was born in Louisville, Kentucky. He had a younger brother named Stephen James Lipsett, a successful real estate investor/broker who lived on Lake Granbury, Texas. As a child, he moved with his family to Dallas, Texas, where he began violin study with Zelman Brounoff and Ruth Lasley. The family subsequently lived in Saint Louis, Missouri, where Lipsett's violin instructor was Melvin Ritter. He graduated from the Cleveland Institute of Music and later studied with Ivan Galamian at The Juilliard School and with Endre Granat. He also earned a B.A. in Music from California State University, Northridge.

Lipsett's students have consistently won top prizes at important competitions including the International Tchaikovsky Competition, Queen Elisabeth Competition, International Yehudi Menuhin Violin Competition, International Joseph Joachim Violin Competition, Irving M. Klein International Competition, and several have received highest honors from the National Association for the Advancement of the Arts, and been recognized as Presidential Scholars. He is a recipient of the Distinguished Teachers Award from the White House Commission for Presidential Scholars. He is also a freelance commercial musician in motion pictures, television and the recording industry.

== Notable students ==
- Danielle Belen, Associate Professor of Violin at the University of Michigan
- Hahn-Bin, concert artist
- Aubree Oliverson, concert artist
- Robert Chen, Concertmaster of the Chicago Symphony Orchestra
- Steven Copes, Concertmaster of the Saint Paul Chamber Orchestra
- Lindsay Deutsch, concert artist
- Jennifer Frautschi, concert artist
- William Hagen, concert artist
- Ken Hamao, member of the Parker Quartet
- Felicity James, Associate Concertmaster of the Cincinnati Symphony Orchestra
- Leila Josefowicz, concert artist
- Mayumi Kanagawa, concert artist
- Tamaki Kawakubo, concert artist
- Fabiola Kim, Assistant Professor of Violin at the University of Michigan
- Michelle Kim, Assistant Concertmaster of the New York Philharmonic
- Sean Lee, concert artist
- Kevin Lin, Concertmaster of the Indianapolis Symphony Orchestra
- Ryan Meehan, member of the Calidore String Quartet
- Jeffrey Myers, member of the Calidore String Quartet
- Avi Nagin, member of the Amernet String Quartet
- Aubree Oliverson, concert artist
- Elizabeth Pitcairn, concert artist and Artistic Director of the Luzerne Music Center
- Grace Park, concert artist
- Simone Porter, concert artist
- Blake Pouliot, concert artist
- Ilana Setapen, Associate Concertmaster of the Milwaukee Symphony Orchestra
- Sheryl Staples, Principal Associate Concertmaster of the New York Philharmonic
- Stephen Tavani, Assistant Concertmaster of the Cleveland Orchestra
