= Frautschi =

Frautschi is a surname. Notable people with the surname include:

- Angela Frautschi (born 1987), Swiss ice hockey player
- Jennifer Frautschi (born 1973), American violinist
- Steven Frautschi (born 1933), American theoretical physicist
