= Stoika Milanova =

Bulgarian violinist (1945–2024)

- Стойка Трендафилова Миланова
- Milanova in the 1970s
- Born: 5 August 1945; Plovdiv, Bulgaria
- Died: 25 September 2024 (aged 79); Madrid, Spain
- Occupations: Classical violinist; Academic teacher
- Organizations: State Conservatory of Venezuela; National Academy of Music

Stoika Trendafilova Milanova (also Stoyka; (Note: Additionally transliterated in accented forms: Stoïka and Stoĭka.) Bulgarian: Стойка Трендафилова Миланова; 5 August 1945 – 29 September 2024) was a Bulgarian classical violinist who had an international career.

Milanova was taught by her father using a method that he developed, and later by the violinist David Oistrakh. After placing second in the Queen Elisabeth Competition (1967) and winning the Carl Flesch Competition (1970), Milanova began an international career as a soloist and recitalist, which was at its height during the 1970s and early 1980s. She taught at the State Conservatory of Venezuela and held the chair of violin at the State Academy of Music of Sofia.

== Early life and education ==
Milanova was born in Plovdiv on 5 August 1945, to Trendafil Milanov (1909–1999) and his wife, Yovka. Her father was a violinist and violin teacher who co-founded a music school in Plovdiv and headed a music school in Sofia, a decade after the family moved there in 1950. Her older sister Dora (1940–1995) was a pianist.

Milanov taught Milanova between the ages of three or four and eighteen. In books of 1958 and 1981, he published a tutorial method, now known as the "Milanov method", based partly on his experiences of teaching her; the first book is illustrated with photographs of a young Milanova demonstrating technique. She studied violin at the State Academy of Music, Sofia, and then at the State Tchaikovsky Conservatory in Moscow (1964–1969), where she was a pupil of David Oistrakh. She won the gold medal of the 8th World Festival of Youth and Students in Helsinki (1962).

== Career ==
Milanova achieved the second prize of the international Queen Elisabeth Competition in Brussels (1967). beating Gidon Kremer, among others. She appeared in 1968 at the Bath Festival, where she played with Yehudi Menuhin and the pianist Clifford Curzon. In 1970, she won the Carl Flesch International Violin Competition in London, and made her London concert debut that year.

She appeared during the 1970s as a soloist with major orchestras, initially in the UK and then in the rest of Europe. She made her Proms debut in 1971, playing Mendelssohn's Violin Concerto with the BBC Symphony Orchestra, conducted by Sir Colin Davis, and made two further Proms appearances, of Beethoven's Violin Concerto conducted by Sir Andrew Davis (1972) and of Mozart's Sinfonia Concertante, alongside violist Csaba Erdélyi and conducted by James Lockhart (1973). She toured in Japan with the Yomiuri Nippon Symphony Orchestra in 1975 or 1976, and appeared as a soloist at the Hong Kong Arts Festival with The Hallé (1976). In 1976, she made a particularly successful tour of Australia, and first appeared in the United States and Canada in 1978.

Her performing career reached its height in the 1970s and early 1980s; she continued to perform frequently into the 2000s, and was still giving recitals in the mid-to-late 2010s. Her duo partners included the pianists Radu Lupu and Malcolm Frager, as well as her sister Dora, and, from the 1980s, her daughter Yova, also a violinist. A recital with Lupu of Schubert and Franck in Bath in 1971 was described as "beautiful" by Hugo Cole, who commented, however, that it was Lupu who gave the performance "new ideas and emotional depth." A performance of Prokofiev's Violin Concerto No. 1 in Birmingham in 1975 was described by Anthony Cross as "displaying considerable technical wizardry" but "somewhat handicapped by a small tone". She played a Guarneri del Gesù "Consolo", dated 1733.

From 2005 until 2010, Milanova taught at the State Conservatory of Venezuela. In 2016 she was appointed professor, chair of violin, at the State Academy of Music in Sofia. She gave masterclasses in various European cities as well as in Venezuela, passing on her father's violin teaching method.

She and her sister were documented in a short film, The Milanova Sisters, of around 1975, and in 1988, Milanova was the subject of a Bulgarian film, directed by Andrei Altuparmakov. She was awarded the "People's Artist" title in Bulgaria (1978) and also won the Rome Saggitario D'Oro (1979). According to her biography in Grove's, Milanova is the only Bulgarian violinist to be discussed in The Great Violinists by Margaret Campbell (1980).

Milanova died in Madrid on 29 September 2024 after a long illness, at the age of 79.

== Recordings ==
Some of Milanova's notable recordings include:

- Prokofiev Violin Concerto No. 1 and No. 2 (Balkanton); awarded a Grand Prix du Disque by the Académie Charles Cros, Paris (1972 or 1973)
- Schumann and Brahms Violin Sonatas, with Malcolm Frager
- Shostakovich Violin Concerto No. 1, with the Bulgarian RTVO
- Vivaldi Concerto Grosso for two violins, cello, and strings, Op. 3/1, with Yova Milanova
- Mozart Violin Concerto No. 5 and Mendelssohn Concerto in D minor for violin, piano and strings (Balkanton; 2009)
- Franck Violin Sonata, with Radu Lupu (1972)
