= Ida Levin =

American musician

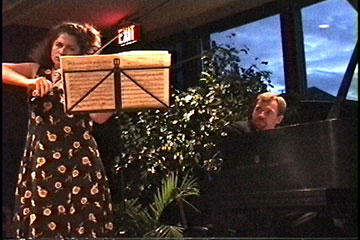
Ida Levin, violinist, performing Elgar's Violin Sonata, in a 1999 program at Bargemusic, Brooklyn, NY, with Anton Nel, piano

Ida Levin (1963 – 19 November 2016) was an American concert violinist. Levin taught at the Sander Vegh International Chamber Music Academy in Prague and was a former faculty member of Harvard University, the Colburn School and the European Mozart Academy.

== Biography ==
Born in Santa Monica, California, Levin began studying the violin at the age of three and made her professional debut performing with the Los Angeles Philharmonic at the age of ten. In 1981, aged 18, Levin was invited by the pianist Rudolf Serkin to perform with him at the White House for President and Nancy Reagan. The performance was part of a series involving experienced musicians introducing promising younger artists, and was recorded and broadcast on PBS. She went on to garner an Avery Fisher Career Grant and made her New York City debut as a soloist with the American Symphony Orchestra at Carnegie Hall. She returned to New York several times, notably playing as a soloist on a number of occasions with the New York String Orchestra under Alexander Schneider at both Carnegie Hall and the Kennedy Center.

An active concert performer and recitalist, Levin performed throughout the world at such venues as the 92nd Street Y, London's Wigmore Hall, the Morgan Library, and Avery Fisher Hall. Internationally, she performed in England, France, the Netherlands, Germany, Italy, Switzerland, Hungary, Poland, the Czech Republic and Israel. She was also an active performer of chamber music and a member of the Boston Chamber Music Society. She also regularly played in Open Chamber Music in Cornwall, Seattle Chamber Music Society, Chamber Music Society of Lincoln Center, the Philadelphia Chamber Music Society and Da Camera of Houston. Levin frequently performed at the Marlboro Music School and Festival, and at the 2002 festival she and pianist Jeremy Denk performed the premiere of a piece composed by Leon Kirchner in memory of the violinist Felix Galimir.

Levin recorded for labels Philips, EMI, Dynamic, Music Masters, and Nonesuch, as well as Stereophile, and wrote articles for Strings magazine.

Levin died of leukemia on 19 November 2016 at the age of 53.
