= Tamaki Kawakubo =

Tamaki Kawakubo 川久保 賜紀
- Born: October 10, 1979 (age 46); Los Angeles, California, U.S.
- Genres: Classical
- Occupation: Musician
- Instrument: Violin
- Website: Tamaki KAWAKUBO

Tamaki Kawakubo (川久保賜紀) (born October 10, 1979) is a Japanese-American violinist. A recipient of an Avery Fisher Career Grant, she won the silver medal at the 2002 International Tchaikovsky Competition and the First Prize at the 2001 Sarasate International Violin Competition.

== Early years ==
Tamaki was born in Palos Verdes, California. She began violin studies at the age of five in Los Angeles. She studied with Robert Lipsett at the Colburn School in Los Angeles. Following this she studied with Dorothy DeLay and Masao Kawasaki at the Juilliard School of performing arts. In 1997, she received an Avery Fisher Career Grant and moved to Zürich to study with Zakhar Bron.

== Career ==
Kawakubo won the silver medal, ex aequo, at the 2002 International Tchaikovsky Competition. This was the highest prize awarded that year. Tamaki has also won first prize at the 2001 Pablo de Sarasate International Violin Competition.

After collaborating with Michael Tilson Thomas and the New World Symphony, Kawakubo began her 2002/03 season in the United States with the San Francisco Symphony. Since then she has appeared as a soloist with many leading orchestras including the Baltimore Symphony Orchestra, Cincinnati Symphony Orchestra, Cleveland Orchestra, Detroit Symphony Orchestra, Houston Symphony Orchestra, Los Angeles Philharmonic, MDR Leipzig Radio Symphony Orchestra, NHK Symphony Orchestra and the Tokyo Metropolitan Symphony Orchestra.

Previously, Kawakubo played the La Cathedrale violin, a Stradivarius on loan from the Mandell Collection.

== Recordings ==
Avex Classics released in 2003 a debut CD of concertos by Mendelssohn and Tchaikovsky. In May 2007 her second CD called Recital! was released receiving high praise from many music magazines.

== Film ==
Tamaki Kawakubo performed the Chaconne from John Corigliano's soundtrack to the film The Red Violin with the New York ensemble Eos Orchestra. She is also featured on the soundtrack for the cartoon series Little Amadeus.
