= William Hagen (musician) =

American classical violinist

William Hagen is an American violinist. He has performed as soloist with the Seattle Symphony, San Francisco Symphony, Chicago Symphony Orchestra, Frankfurt Radio Symphony, Chamber Orchestra of Europe, Belgian National Orchestra and Amsterdam Sinfonietta.

He was the third prizewinner of the 2015 Queen Elisabeth Competition in Brussels, Belgium and second prizewinner in the 2014 Fritz Kreisler Competition in Vienna, Austria.

== Biography ==
Born in Salt Lake City, Hagen started playing the violin at age 4 and made his orchestral debut with the Utah Symphony at age 9. He studied at the Colburn School with Robert Lipsett, the Juilliard School with Itzhak Perlman, and Kronberg Academy with Christian Tetzlaff.

As a recitalist and chamber musician, Hagen has performed at the Louvre, Wigmore Hall, Beethoven House, and Santa Fe Chamber Music Festival.

Hagen currently performs on the 1732 Arkwright Lady Rebecca Sylvan Stradivarius violin, loaned from the Rachel Barton Pine Foundation.

Hagen played varsity baseball in high school and hit 23 career home runs. He was diagnosed with Type 1 diabetes at a young age.
