= City of London Festival =

Annual arts festival in the City of London, England

The City of London Festival was an annual arts festival that took place in the City of London, England, over two to three weeks in June and July. The Festival was strongly geared towards classical music, but also offered a programme that included jazz, world music, opera, film screenings, lectures and guided tours. Performances were usually held within local venues including some of London's ornate churches, St Paul's Cathedral and Livery Company Halls.

In 2016 the festival announced it was closing, stating:

"However over the years the funding landscape has become ever more competitive and despite achieving support from a range of valued sponsors and supporters it has become increasingly difficult to attract the level of funding necessary to stage the annual festival."

Many events were free with the aim being to make the arts accessible to a larger proportion of the City's population. These were often held outdoors in the City's streets, squares and gardens. These venues included the Guildhall Yard, Liverpool Street Station, St Paul's Cathedral steps and Finsbury Circus Gardens. Another part of the programme of the Festival was educational; primary and secondary schools from around the City were involved in a variety of culturally enriching projects which were then showcased within the main Festival programme.

The City of London Corporation provided the main support for the festival and as a result of its close ties to major businesses within the Square Mile many companies became involved in sponsoring and supporting the festival since its inception in 1962.

Some Festivals looked at London's links with important international trading centres. 2005 saw a Dutch theme, 2006 highlighted Japanese culture and 2007 showed the City's connections to France's trading centres, whilst also exploring the 200th Anniversary of the parliamentary Abolition of the slave trade in the United Kingdom.

In 1968 the long-established Carl Flesch Violin Competition was brought under the aegis of the City of London Festival to create the City of London International Violin Competition. In 1992, the Festival withdrew its support for the competition, which has not been held since.

In 2004 a free winter concert series was established which ran annually with performances from mid-January until late March, its last concerts being held in 2016.

In 2009 (with Sing London), 2010, 2011 and 2012 City of London Festival produced and presented the street pianos project Play Me, I'm Yours. 125 pianos were placed across London streets, squares and gardens, reaching audiences estimated at 3.5 million.
