= La Cathedrale (Stradivarius violin) =

La cathédrale is a 1707 violin made by Antonio Stradivari. The Associated Press reported that the instrument was named La Cathedrale for the "majesty of its tone". It fetched a record $483,000 at Sotheby's auction in 1984, the highest for any musical instrument sold at auction. The record was subsequently usurped by Luigi Alberto Bianchi, who acquired The Colossus for $726,000 in 1987.

Nigel Kennedy played La Cathedrale early in his career, but later purchased the Lafont, an instrument made by Guarneri del Gesù. For a time La Cathedrale was part of the Mandell Collection; antique violins from this collection were loaned to young students. In 2014, the Los Angeles Times reported that the Mandells had sold La Cathedrale to raise funds for the purchase of additional instruments for Mandell Artists. Before the Mandells sold the instrument, La Cathedrale was loaned to Tamaki Kawakubo, who won the 2002 International Tchaikovsky Competition.

== See also ==
List of Stradivarius instruments#Celli
