= Dong-Suk Kang =

South Korean violinist (born 1954)

- Born: April 28, 1954 (age 72); Seoul
- Occupation: Violinist

Korean name
- Hangul: 강동석
- Hanja: 姜東錫
- RR: Gang Dongseok
- MR: Kang Tongsŏk

Dong-Suk Kang (born April 28, 1954) is a South Korean violinist.

== Biography ==
Kang was born in Seoul, and played his first concert at the age of eight. He went to New York in 1967 to study at the Juilliard School and completed his education with Ivan Galamian at the Curtis Institute of Music. In 1971 he won the San Francisco Symphony Foundation Competition and the Merriweather Post Competition in Washington D.C.

He has played with renowned orchestras in several continents such as the Philadelphia Orchestra, the Cleveland Orchestra and the Montreal Symphony Orchestra in America, the Royal Philharmonic, the London Philharmonic, the Royal Scottish National Orchestra and the Leipzig Gewandhaus Orchestra in Europe, the Tokyo Metropolitan Symphony Orchestra, and the Hong Kong Philharmonic Orchestra in Asia, the orchestras of the Australian Broadcasting Corporation in Australia among many others.

Kang has worked with conductors such as Charles Dutoit, Kurt Masur, Yehudi Menuhin and Seiji Ozawa among many others.

He prefers to play "chamber music that is smaller in scale but warmer in mood than grandiose orchestral music". His wide-ranging repertoire includes all the standard works as well as many unusual and neglected works.

His recordings include award-winning performances of the Elgar, the Walton, the Nielsen and the Sibelius violin concertos, and the complete chamber music of Honegger and Alkan.

In his book "The Book of the Violin" the music critic Dominic Gill describes Dong-Suk Kang as "already one of the world’s great violinists. His flawless technique and perfect bow arm certainly produce one of the most beautiful violin tones to be heard anywhere today".

Kang is married and the father of two children. He has taught at Yonsei University since 2003, and has held the "Concert of Hope" to combat hepatitis every year since 2000.

== Awards and distinctions ==
- Korean Dong-A Music Competition, 1966
- San Francisco Symphony Competition, 1971
- Merriweather Post Competition, 1971
- Carl Flesch International Violin Competition, second prize, 1974
- Montreal International Music Competition, second prize, 1975
- Queen Elisabeth Music Competition, third prize, 1976
- Grand Prix du Disque, Académie Charles Cros
- Grand Prix Nouvelle Académie du Disque
- CD of the month, Gramophone magazine 2000 (for Walton's Violin Concerto)

== Selected discography ==
- Beethoven, Triple Concerto for Violin, Cello and Piano [Naxos, 8.554288, released in 1998]
- Debussy, Sonata for Violin and Piano in G minor [Naxos, 8.550276, released in 1990]
- Elgar, Concerto for Violin in B minor [Naxos, 8.550489, released in 1991]
- Fauré, Sonatas for Violin and Piano 1 and 2 [Naxos, 8.550906, released in 1995]
- Grieg, the three Sonatas for Violin and Piano [BIS, CD-647, released in 1994]
- Halvorsen, Air Norvegienne, Op. 7 [Naxos, 8.550329, released in 1990]
- Nielsen, Concerto for Violin [BIS, CD-370, released in 1987]
- Saint-Saëns, Concerto for Violin No.3, Introduction and Rondo Capriccioso, Sonata for Violin and Piano No. 1 [Naxos, 8.550752, released in 1994]
- Sibelius, Concerto for Violin, Humoresques for Violin and Orchestra [Naxos, 8.550329, released in 1990]
- William Walton, Concerto for Violin in B minor [Naxos, 8.554325, released in 1999]
