= Silas Farley =

American ballet dancer

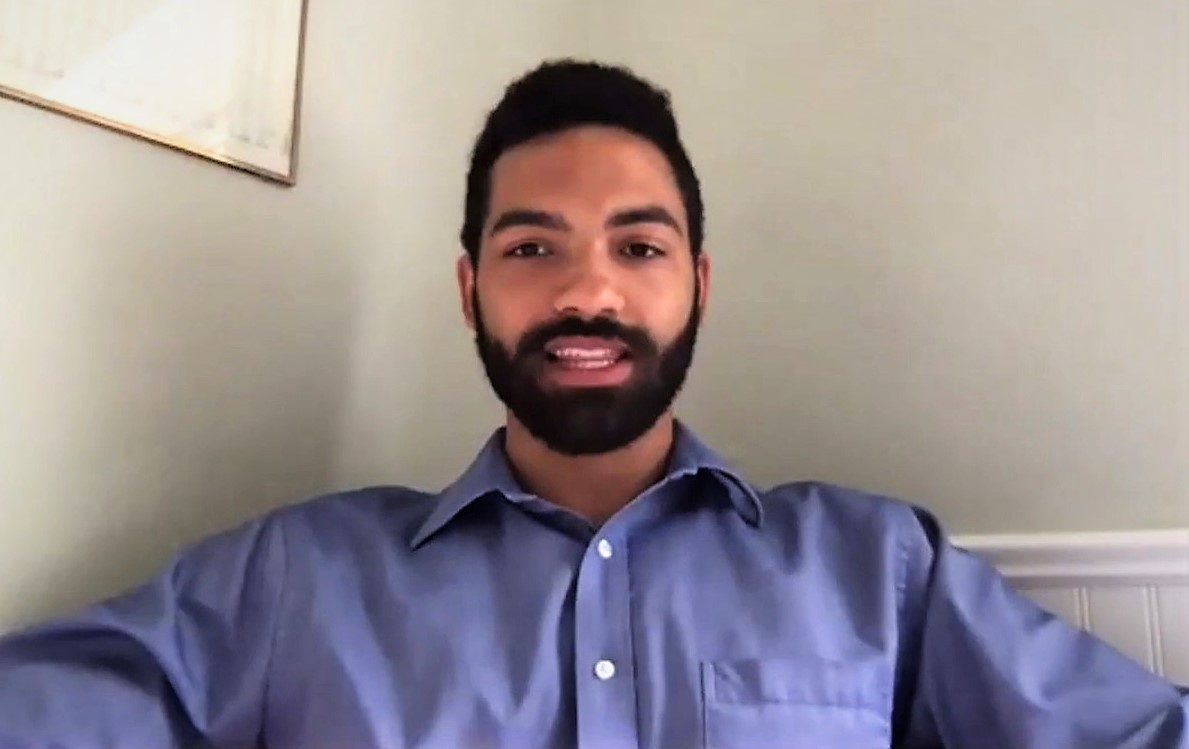
- Farley speaks to the Church of the Heavenly Rest in 2020
- Born: 1994 or 1995 (age 31–32)
- Education: School of American Ballet
- Occupations: ballet dancer; choreographer; educator
- Organization: New York City Ballet
- Spouse: Cassia Wilson
- Family: Matthias Farley (brother)

Silas Farley (born 1994 or 1995) is an American ballet dancer, choreographer and educator. He danced at the New York City Ballet between 2013 and 2020, and choreographed outside the company. Between 2021 and 2023, he was the dean of Colburn School's Trudl Zipper Dance Institute.

== Early life and training ==
Farley was raised in Charlotte, North Carolina, the youngest of seven children. One of his brothers, Matthias Farley, is a football player. Silas Farley started dancing at age seven. He later joined a program for young male dancers at the North Carolina Dance Theatre School of Dance, where he was taught by the school's then-director, Darleen Callaghan, as well as former New York City Ballet principal dancers Patricia McBride and Jean-Pierre Bonnefoux. At age eleven, he made his choreographic debut at a student workshop in Charlotte. At thirteen, he started teaching other students at the encouragement of Callaghan.

At age fourteen, Farley entered the School of American Ballet (SAB). At the time, since he was too young to choreograph at the student workshop there, he served as the unofficial ballet master and "the cheerleader with a notebook" for a piece by 18-year-old Lauren Lovette. Farley did so for another year, then choreographed for the workshop for two consecutive years. Farley attended SAB with scholarship and graduated after four years of training. After he graduated high school, he was accepted to Harvard University on full scholarship, but opted to pursue a career in dance first.

== Career ==
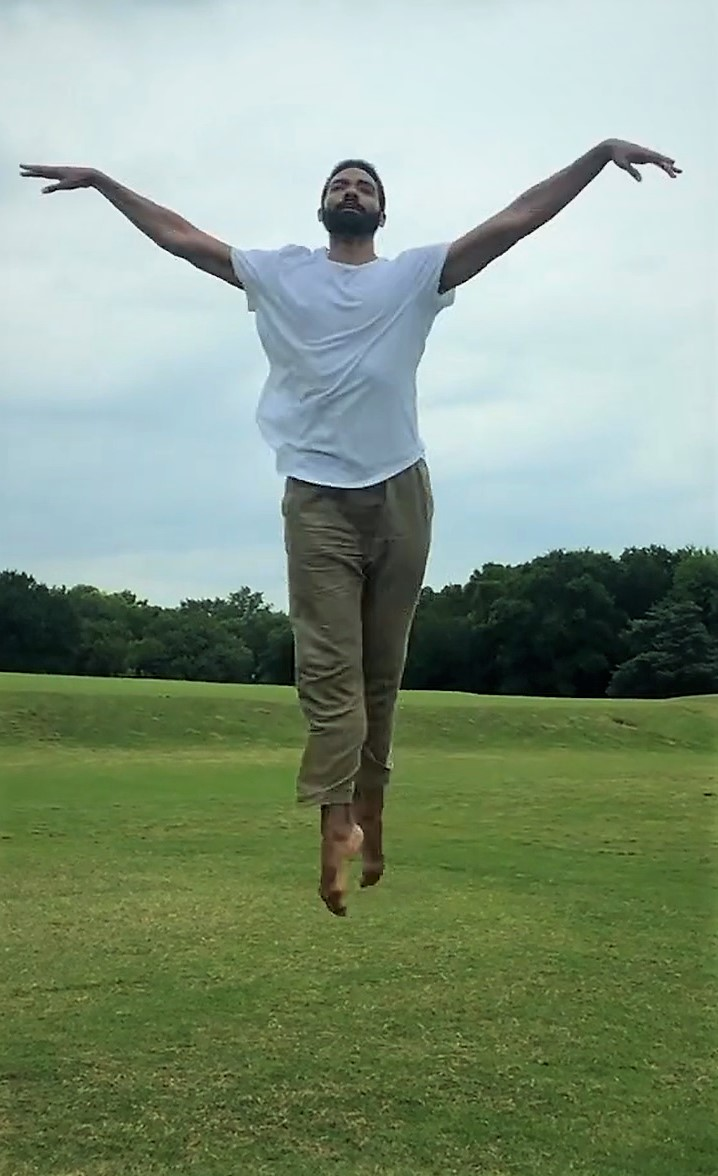
Farley dances for the Church of the Heavenly Rest in 2020

In 2012, Farley became an apprentice with the New York City Ballet, and was chosen to be a teaching fellow at SAB. He joined the corps de ballet the following year. Lead roles he performed include the Cavalier in Balanchine's The Nutcracker and Prince Ivan in Firebird. Throughout his time in the company, he was one of the few African American dancers in the company. He also hosts the segment "Hear the Dance" of the company podcast.

In 2013, Farley choreographed for the SAB Winter Ball. In 2019, he made Songs From the Spirit, a piece about prison life that was performed at the Metropolitan Museum of Art, in collaboration with the podcast Ear Hustle. He joined the board of the George Balanchine Foundation the same year.

In June 2020, Farley, who was 26, announced that he would retire from the New York City Ballet, but would continue to host "Hear the Dance" and teach at SAB when possible. He became the artist-in-residence in ballet at the Meadows School of the Arts, Southern Methodist University, in the 2020–21 school year.

During the COVID-19 pandemic, he became involved with the Los Angeles-based Colburn School, becoming the inaugural artist of Amplify Series, which celebrates artists of color. He also taught master classes and choreographed for the school's virtual summer intensive and a section of the virtual production of The Nutcracker. He also choreographed a video titled Werner Sonata for the Washington Ballet, and another for The Guggenheim's Works & Process series. He also made Collage & Creed for American Ballet Theatre, which premiered in June 2021 in Green Mountain Falls, Colorado.

Farley became the dean of the Colburn School's Trudl Zipper Dance Institute in July 2021, succeeding Jenifer Ringer. Darleen Callaghan, Farley's former teacher who remains a mentor, assumed the role of associate dean. He stepped down in 2023.

On May 5, 2022, Farley's first main stage production for the New York City Ballet, Architects of Time, premiered. He and composer David K. Israel were commissioned by the company to make a ballet inspired by a poem Balanchine wrote for Igor Stravinsky, who set it to a melody.

== Personal life ==
Farley is married to Cassia Wilson, also a ballet dancer.

As of 2020, he is studying at the Harvard Extension School.
