= Peter Michalica =

Peter Michalica (born July 10, 1945, Kremnica) is a Slovak violinist renowned for his contributions to classical music.

== Early life and education ==
Michalica was born in Kremnica and studied violin at the Academy of Performing Arts in Bratislava under Professor Ján Skladaný.

Peter Michalica studied at the Conservatory and at the Academy of Performing Arts in Bratislava (prof. Ján Skladaný), at Moscow Tchaikovsky Conservatory (prof. Jurij Jankelevich), and at the Royal Conservatory in Brussels (prof. A. Gertler). He also perfected his mastery under the guidance of the famous violinists Wolfgang Schneiderhan and Henryk Szeryng.

== Career ==
In 1966, he placed third in the Carl Flesch International Violin Competition in London.

He has since performed extensively as a soloist and chamber musician, participating in international festivals and collaborating with numerous orchestras.

== Music Under the Diamond Vault ==
In 2000, Michalica reacquired his family home, the 15th-century Dom Komorského Grófa (House of the Chamber Count), which had been confiscated during the communist era. He restored the building and launched the Music Under the Diamond Vault festival there in 2001. The festival is held annually and includes concerts and masterclasses in a Gothic setting.

== Awards ==
Michalica has received several prestigious awards:

Pribina Cross, 2nd Class (2013) Pavol Strauss Award (2007) Tatra Bank Foundation Award (1997) National Award of the Slovak Socialist Republic (1982, 1986)

== Discography ==
Michalica has recorded concertos by Tchaikovsky and Dvořák with the Slovak Philharmonic and Philharmonia Cassovia.
