= Fabiola Kim =

American Violinist

- Born: March 21, 1991 (age 35); New Jersey, U.S.
- Other name: Kim Hwa-ra (김화라)
- Education: Juilliard School (BM, MM) Colburn School (AD)
- Occupation: Assistant Professor of Violin
- Employer: University of Michigan
- Father: Kim Dae-jin
- Website: fabiolakim.com

Fabiola Kim (born March 21, 1991) is an American violinist. A professor of violin at the University of Michigan, she is also on the faculty at the Colburn School, Center Stage Strings in Ann Arbor, Michigan, and the Innsbrook Institute. She is co-founder and co-artistic director of the Sounding Point Academy along with her former teacher Robert Lipsett.

== Early life and education ==
Kim was born on March 21, 1991, in New Jersey. Her mother is a violinist and her father is pianist Kim Dae-jin. Her family moved to Seoul, South Korea in 1994. She began her studies at the Korea National University of Arts pre-college. At 13, Kim moved to New York City and attended the Juilliard School pre-college program. From 2006 to 2010 her teacher was renowned violinist Kyung Wha-Chung. Kim earned a bachelor's and master's degree from the Juilliard School studying with Sylvia Rosenberg and Ronald Copes. She received an artistic diploma from the Colburn School studying with Robert Lipsett where she also served as his teaching assistant. Kim was the concertmaster for both the Juilliard and Colburn orchestras.

== Professional career ==
Kim made her concerto debut at the age of seven with the Seoul Philharmonic Orchestra. She has since performed with orchestras and artists including the Berliner Symphoniker, the Munich Chamber Orchestra, the Hofer Symphoniker, the Munich Symphony Orchestra, the Seoul and Suwon Philharmonic Orchestras, the Budapest Symphony Orchestra MAV, the North Czech Philharmonic Orchestra, the Korean Chamber Orchestra, the Colburn Orchestra, the Aspen Philharmonia, the Juilliard Orchestra, cellist Lynn Harrell, violinist Cho-Liang Lin, violist Paul Neubauer, cellist Frans Helmerson, cellist Marc Coppey, violinist Ida Kavafian, and conductors Alan Gilbert, Esa-Pekka Salonen, Gilbert Varga, Jane Glover, Nayden Todorov and Nicholas McGegan, among others.

She has won the Aspen Music Festival Violin Concerto Competition, the Juilliard Concerto Competition, the Livingston Symphony Orchestra Young Artists Concerto Competition and the Kumho Prodigy Music Award, and is the youngest winner of the Seoul Philharmonic Orchestra’s Concerto Competition in its history. She was also a prize winner at the Corpus Christi International Competition and the Irving M. Klein International Competition for Strings.

In 2017 Kim represented South Korea at the Brucknerfest in Linz performing Barber's Violin Concerto. She has also appeared at festivals and institutions including the Aspen Music Festival and School, the Ravinia Steans Institute, the Verbier Festival and La Jolla Music Society SummerFest.

Kim accepted the position of assistant professor of violin at the University of Michigan School of Music, Theatre & Dance in January 2020. She is also on the faculty of the Colburn School, Center Stage Strings and the Innsbrook Institute, and is co-founder and co-artistic director of Sounding Point Academy with violin pedagogue Robert Lipsett.

In 2019 Kim released a CD titled 1939 with the Munich Symphony and Kevin John Edusei, including concertos by Béla Bartók, Karl Amadeus Hartmann, and William Walton all composed in the year 1939. Matthew Rye, former chief sub-editor of BBC Music Magazine and a reviewer for The Strad, said of the recording, "Kim gives a heartfelt performance that taps its emotions as much as it exploits its unashamed playfulness, and again there’s vigorous, characterful orchestral support. This, then, is a highly satisfying concerto collection, all in excellently recorded sound." The same year, the orchestra and Kim continued their collaboration with a tour to South Korea where she performed Tchaikovsky's Violin Concerto.

In 2025, Kim made her debut in the Golden Hall of the Musikverein in Vienna with the Sofia Philharmonic Orchestra conducted by Nayden Todorov, performing Sergei Prokofiev's Violin Concerto No. 2 in G minor, Op. 63.

Kim plays on the 1733 "Huberman, Kreisler" Stradivarius violin.

== Discography ==
- 1939. Solo Musica GmbH. Fabiola Kim, Kevin John Edusei, Munich Symphony. Béla Bartok Violin Concerto No. 2, Karl Amadeus Hartmann Concerto funèbre, William Walton Violin Concerto. 2019-07-06.
