= Alastair Macaulay =

American writer and dance critic

- Education: Felsted School (1964-1973) University of Cambridge (1973-1976)
- Website: https://www.alastairmacaulay.com/

Alastair Macaulay is an English-born writer, critic, and historian of the performing arts. He was the chief dance critic for The New York Times from 2007 until his retirement in 2018. He was also previously chief dance critic at The Times and The Times Literary Supplement and chief theater critic of the Financial Times, both of London. He founded the British quarterly Dance Theater Journal in 1983. In addition to his roles as critic, Macaulay has written for The New Yorker and also published a biography on Margot Fonteyn. In 2000, he wrote Matthew Bourne and His Adventures in Dance: Conversations with Alastair Macaulay with Matthew Bourne. Macaulay was named one of the New York Public Library for the Performing Arts' Jerome Robbins Dance Division Fellows in 2017. As of 2019, Macaulay was an instructor at the 92nd Street Y in New York City.

Macaulay started a controversy in 2010 when he disparagingly commented on the weight of ballet dancer Jenifer Ringer. In a review of a performance of The Nutcracker, he wrote that Ringer, as the Sugar Plum Fairy, "looked as if she'd eaten one sugar plum too many," and that her partner, "Jared Angle, the Cavalier, seems to have been sampling half the Sweet realm.” Public backlash, especially with regards to Macaulay's comments on Ringer, was swift. Macaulay published a response to the controversy explaining his perspective and writing, "The body in ballet becomes a subject of the keenest observation and the most intense discussion. I am severe — but ballet, as dancers know, is more so."
