= Edward McGuire (composer) =

Scottish composer

- Born: Edward McGuire; 1948 (age 77–78); Glasgow, Scotland
- Other name: Eddie McGuire
- Education: Royal Academy of Music
- Occupation: Composer
- Known for: Orchestral, operatic and chamber compositions
- Awards: British Composers' Award (2003)

Edward ("Eddie") McGuire (born 1948) is a Scottish composer whose work ranges from compositions for solo instruments and voice to large-scale orchestral and operatic works. McGuire studied composition with James Iliff at the Royal Academy of Music in London from 1966 to 1970 and then with Ingvar Lidholm in Stockholm in 1971.

== Early life ==
McGuire was born and brought up in Possilpark in Glasgow. His father played folk violin and was a member of a male voice choir which sang arrangements of Scottish Gaelic and Irish songs at charity concerts.

== Career ==
As a student at the Royal Academy of Music McGuire won the Hecht Prize (1968) and the National Young Composers Competition (held in Liverpool University in 1969). A competition organised by the Society for the Promotion of New Music to find a modern test piece for the 1978 Carl Flesch International Violin Competition was won by McGuire with a solo violin piece, Rant. This piece was recently performed for a 65th birthday concert for McGuire organised by the BBC Scottish Symphony Club which was followed by another concert at the Edinburgh Festival Fringe. Another early success was when String Quartet was selected for the 40th anniversary Barbican Gala of the SPNM in 1983.

His three act opera The Loving of Etain to a libretto by Marianne Carey was premiered by Paragon Opera at the Atheneum Theatre, Glasgow, in 1990. McGuire's two act opera Cullercoats Tommy, with a libretto by Michael Wilcox was premiered by Northern Sinfonia and Northern Stage in Newcastle upon Tyne in 1993. McGuire received a British Composers' Award in 2003. In 2004 he received a Creative Scotland Award which allowed him to create the work Defying Fate. He was commissioned to produce the finale for the 2006 St Magnus Festival, Ring of Strings. Calgacus, first recorded in 1997 by BBCSSO at the London Proms was performed again by the same orchestra for 2014 Celtic Connections. His most frequently performed work has been his three act ballet Peter Pan staged by Scottish Ballet and Hong Kong Ballet over 120 times with a page dedicated to it on his website.

McGuire plays the flute in the folk group the Whistlebinkies. In January 2006 he travelled to Hong Kong with the group to play a concert ("Scotland the Brave") with the City Chamber Orchestra of Hong Kong.

A CD of his music, Eddie McGuire: Music for Flute, Guitar and Piano, on the Delphian Records label was 'Editor's Choice' in Gramophone magazine in 2006. In 2015 Delphian Records released Entangled Fortunes performed by the Red Note Ensemble and once again featured in Gramophone magazine 'Editor's Choice'

== Selected compositions ==
Orchestral

- Symphony. Glasgow: Scottish Music Centre, 1978. Musical score.
- Source, symphonic poem for orchestra. Glasgow: Scottish Music Centre, 1979. Musical score.
- A Glasgow Symphony, composed for the National Youth Orchestra of Scotland, 1990
- Peter Pan, a ballet score in 3 acts for orchestra. Glasgow: Scottish Music Centre, 1990. Musical score.
- Concerto for double bass, 1994
- Calgacus, symphonic poem. Glasgow: Scottish Music Centre, 1996. Musical score.
- The Spirit of Wallace, symphonic poem, 1997
- Trombone Concerto, with string orchestra. Glasgow: Scottish Music Centre, 1997. Musical score.
- Viola Concerto, with string orchestra. Glasgow: Scottish Music Centre, 1998. Musical score.
- Accordion Concerto, 1999
- Violin Concerto, 1999
- Earthrise, symphonic poem for brass band, 2003
- Hall of Memories, orchestral overture marking the re-opening of the renovated Glasgow City Halls, 2006
- Clyde Built, orchestral overture for the Ulster Orchestra, 2008
- Chinese Folksong Suite for strings, 2011
- Cello Concerto, with string orchestra. Glasgow: Scottish Music Centre, 2020. Musical score.
- Revival, orchestral overture, 2023

Chamber and instrumental

- Horn Trio, 1966
- Trio for Flute, Oboe, Bassoon. Glasgow: Scottish Music Centre, 1971. Musical score.
- Twelve White-note Pieces for piano, 1971
- Liberation, for flute, clarinet, viola and harp, 1975
- Euphoria, for flute, clarinet, violin, cello, piano and percussion, 1980
- Wind Octet, 1980
- String Quartet. SPNM competition winner. Glasgow: Scottish Music Centre, 1982. Musical score.
- Rant for solo violin. Glasgow: Scottish Music Centre, 1986. Musical score.
- String Trio, 1986
- Guitar Concerto, 1988
- Dark Cloud for eight guitars, 1991
- Elegy for piano trio, 1992
- Harp octet, 1992
- Violin Sonatina, violin and piano. Glasgow: Scottish Music Centre, 1997. Musical score.
- Romance for cello and guitar, 1994. Glasgow: Scottish Music Centre, 1998. Musical score.
- Chinese Knotwork for four clarinets, 2001
- Dancing Memories for solo flute, 2001
- Entangled Fortunes for clarinet, violin, cello and piano, written to celebrate the awarding of a Nobel Prize to Sir James Mirrlees, 2002
- Prelude 22: (The Big Bang), for solo trumpet. Coventry: Warwick Music, 2005. Musical score.
- Botanic Gardens for four players at two pianos, 2016
- Kaleidoscope Suite for double wind quintet. Glasgow: Scottish Music Centre, 2019. Musical score.
- String Trio II: McEwen Commission. Glasgow: Scottish Music Centre, 2019. Musical score.
- Euphoria for sextet. Recorded by Red Note on Delphian. Glasgow: Scottish Music Centre, 2020. Musical score.
- Three Comic Sketches, suite for four bass clarinets. Glasgow: Scottish Music Centre, 2020. Musical score.

Opera

- The Loving of Etain, 1990
- Cullercoats Tommy, 1993
- Cake-Talk, 1996
- Helen of Braemore, 1997

Vocal

- Pipes of Peace, a setting of the Psalms for chorus and bagpipes, 1986
- Celtic Knotwork for 3 recorders, voices, 4 flutes or 4 clarinets. Glasgow: Scottish Music Centre, 1990. Musical score.
- Songs from the North for soprano and brass quintet, 2014
- On Inchcolm for SATB choir & ensemble, to poem by Tom Furniss. Glasgow: Scottish Music Centre, 2017. Musical score.

== Selected recordings ==
- Fast Peace 3. Point of Departure, Alma Duo (Phyllis Kamrin, viola, and Michael Goldberg, guitar), Kamelion KA9001CD (1994)
- Viola Pieces. James Durrant performs McGuire's Divertimento for 20 Violas, Prelude 6 and Martyr Alto Records CD1 (1994)
- Upstart Jugglers: Mr McFall's Chamber ensemble perform McGuire's Nocturnes, Mr McFalls Chamber MMCC 003 (2001)
- Albannach, performed by The Whistlebinkies, CDTRAX288 (2006)
- Music for Flute, Guitar and Piano], includes Dancing Memories, Harbour of Harmonies, Twelve White Note Pieces. Nancy Ruffer (flute), Abigail James (guitar) and Dominic Saunders (piano). Delphian DCD34029 (2006)
- Knotwork: the Fell Clarinet Quartet perform McGuire's Celtic Knotwork and Chinese Knotwork, Delphian DCD34065 (2008)
- Flotilla: the Flotilla trio of 2 soprano saxophones and alto saxophone perform McGuire's Remembrance (ATKS 0802) Big Shed Music (2008)
- Embracing the Unknown: Edinburgh String Quartet, John Kenny (trombone), Catriona McKay (harp) play McGuire's Guest Sextet (BC3010) Brass Classics (2009)
- The Prairie Song Project: Amy Morris (flute) and Michael Heaston (piano) perform McGuire's Aria Prairie Song Project (2012)
- Guitar Phases: Stefan Grasse performs McGuire's Dark Cloud for 8 guitars, Xolo CD 1033 (2014)
- Entangled Fortunes: Red Note Ensemble, includes Elegy, Euphoria, String Trio, Entangled Fortunes, Quintet 2, Delphian CDDCD34157 (2015)
- Luminate: Live Music Now Scotland Celebrates 30 Years. Includes Dance Suite for Two, Delphian DCD34153-CD (2015)
- Celtic Prayer: Paisley Abbey Choir sings McGuire's Three Donne Lyrics, Priory PRCD 1234 (2020)
- Six Small Pieces in C major, Prelude 7, Richard Deering (piano), Heritage HTGCD142 (2023)
- Accordion Concerto. Owen Murray, accordion, BBC Concert Orchestra, cond. Sir James MacMillan. Toccata TOCN0016 (2026)
