= Matthias Farley =

American football player (born 1992)

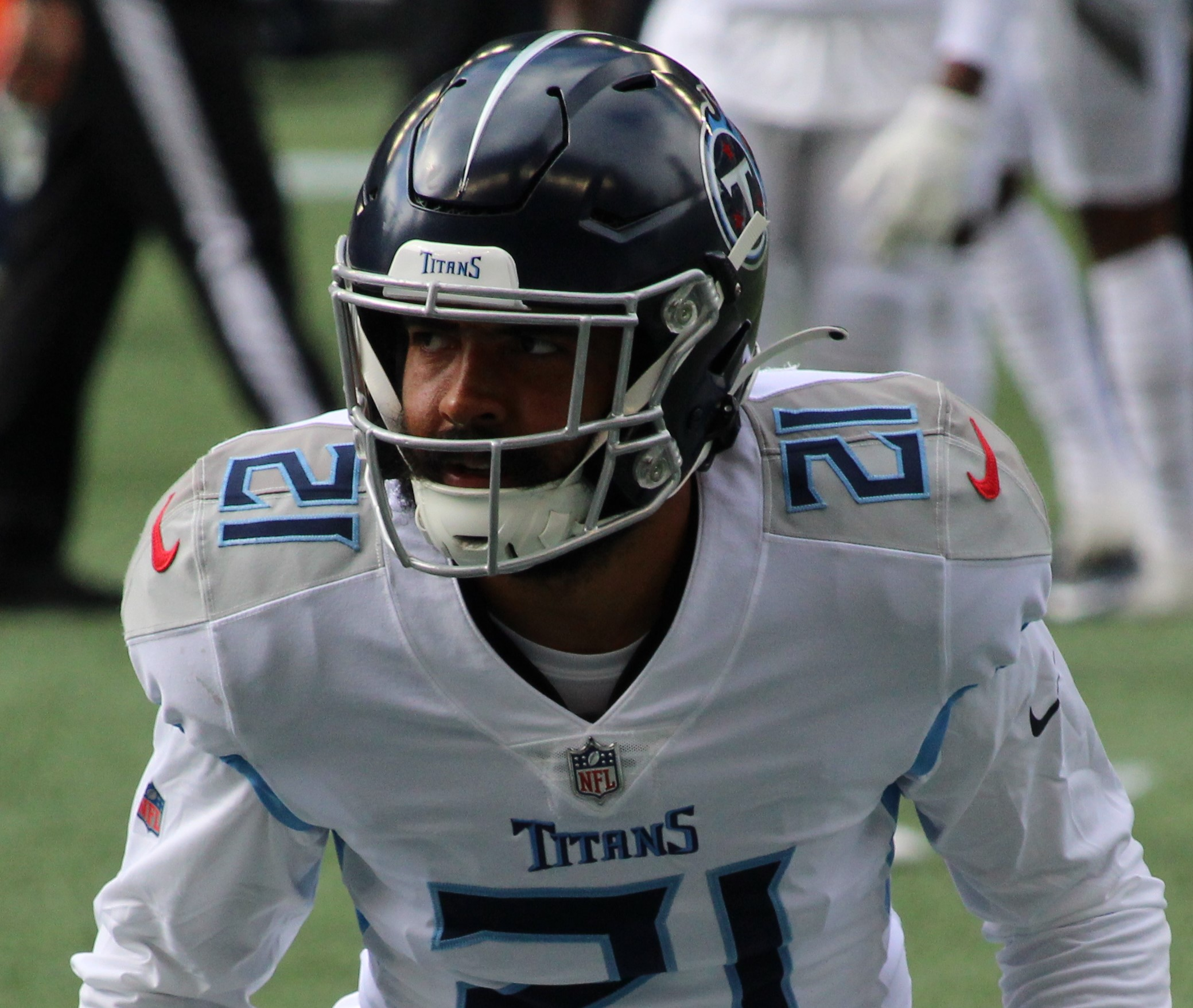
- Farley with the Tennessee Titans in 2021

Profile
- Position: Safety

Personal information
- Born: July 15, 1992 (age 34); Charlotte, North Carolina, U.S.
- Listed height: 5 ft 11 in (1.80 m)
- Listed weight: 209 lb (95 kg)

Career information
- High school: Charlotte Christian
- College: Notre Dame
- NFL draft: 2016: undrafted

Career history
- Arizona Cardinals (2016)*; Indianapolis Colts (2016–2018); New York Jets (2019–2020); Tennessee Titans (2021); Las Vegas Raiders (2022); Carolina Panthers (2023)
- * Offseason or practice squad member only

Career NFL statistics
- Total tackles: 194
- Forced fumbles: 3
- Fumble recoveries: 2
- Pass deflections: 14
- Interceptions: 3
- Stats at Pro Football Reference

Matthias Farley (born July 15, 1992) is an American professional football safety. He played college football at Notre Dame. Farley was signed by the Arizona Cardinals as an undrafted free agent in 2016. He has also played for the Indianapolis Colts, the New York Jets and the Tennessee Titans.

== College career ==
Farley played in 52 games (26 starts) in four seasons at Notre Dame and recorded 192 tackles, 9.5 tackles for loss, 3.5 sacks, eight interceptions, 13 passes defensed and one forced fumble. He began his collegiate career as a wide receiver and redshirted in 2011. He moved to safety in 2012.

== Professional career ==
Pre-draft measurables
Height	Weight	40-yard dash	10-yard split	20-yard split	20-yard shuttle	Three-cone drill	Vertical jump	Broad jump	Bench press
5 ft 11 in (1.80 m)	205 lb (93 kg)	4.50 s	1.64 s	2.59 s	4.30 s	7.13 s	33 in (0.84 m)	10 ft 0 in (3.05 m)	21 reps
All values from Notre Dame's Pro Day

=== Arizona Cardinals ===
On April 30, 2016, the Arizona Cardinals signed Farley to a three-year, $1.62 million contract after he went undrafted in the 2016 NFL draft. Throughout training camp, Farley competed for a roster spot as a backup safety and special teams contributor against Chris Clemons, Marqui Christian, Durell Eskridge, and Tyrequek Zimmerman. On September 3, the Cardinals waived Farley as part of final roster cuts.

=== Indianapolis Colts ===
==== 2016 ====
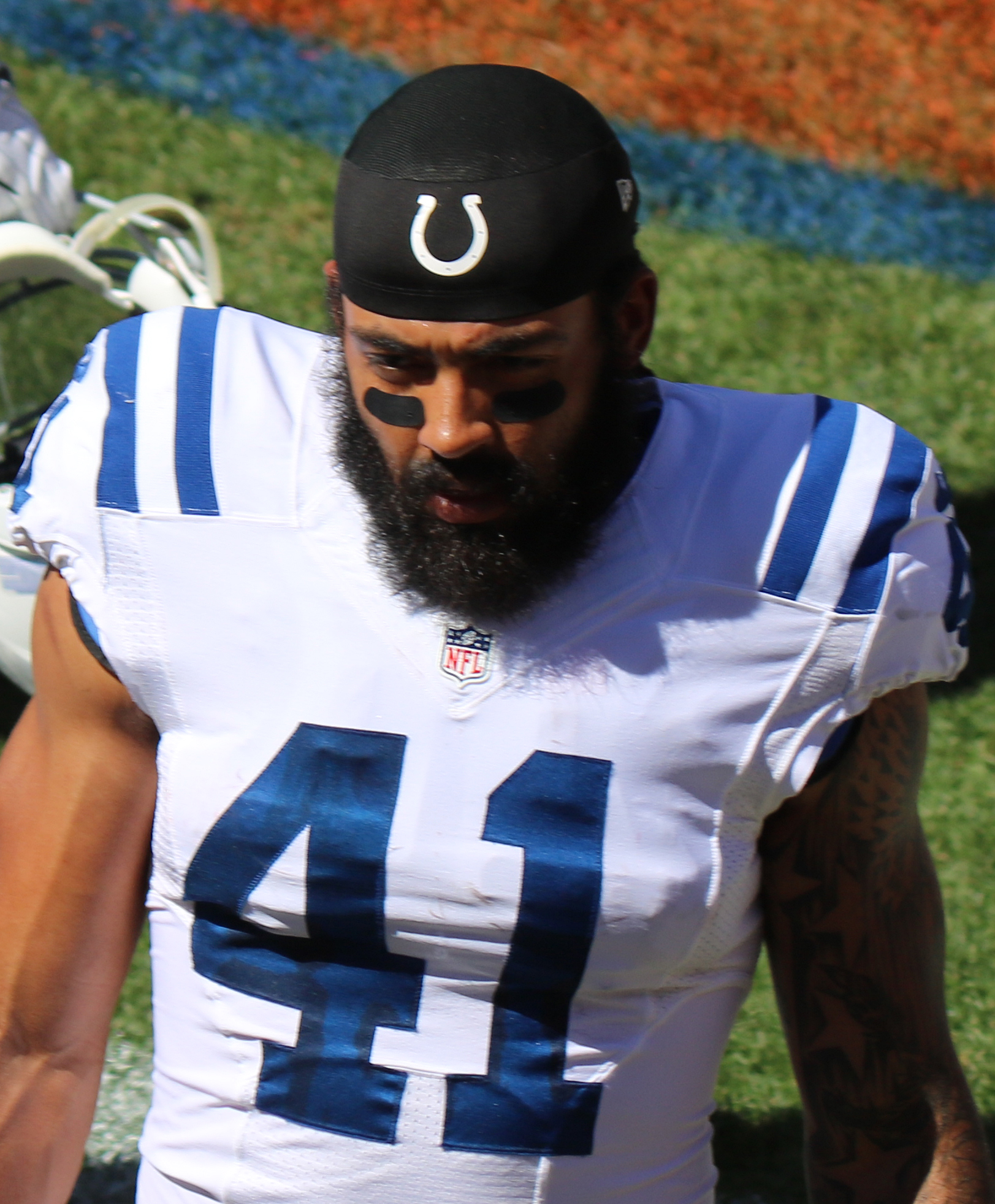
Farley with the Colts in 2016

On September 4, 2016, the Indianapolis Colts claimed Farley off of waivers. Upon joining the team, head coach Chuck Pagano named him the third free safety on the Colts' depth chart, behind Clayton Geathers and T. J. Green.

He made his professional regular season debut in the Colts' season-opening 39–35 loss to the Detroit Lions. The following week, Farley recorded two solo tackles during a 34–20 loss at the Denver Broncos in Week 2. He made his first career tackle on running back C. J. Anderson in the fourth quarter after Anderson caught a six-yard pass. On January 1, 2017, Farley tied his season-high of two solo tackles in the Colts' 24–20 victory against the Jacksonville Jaguars. He finished his rookie season in 2016 with 11 combined tackles (eight solo) in 16 games and zero starts.

==== 2017 ====
During organized team activities and training camp, he competed for a job as a backup safety against T. J. Green, Andrew Williamson, Tyvis Powell, Lee Hightower, and Tyson Graham. He became the frontrunner for the role of starting strong safety after rookie first round pick Malik Hooker sustained numerous injuries throughout OTA's and training camp. Defensive coordinator Ted Monachino named Farley the starting strong safety to begin the regular season, along with free safety Darius Butler.

He made his first career start in the Colts' season-opener against the Los Angeles Rams and recorded ten combined tackles (eight solo) in their 46–9 loss. On October 1, 2017, Farley made ten combined tackles (four solo), a pass deflection, and made his first career interception off a pass by quarterback Russell Wilson in the Colts' 46–18 loss at the Seattle Seahawks in Week 4. In Week 14, Farley recorded nine combined tackles, broke up a pass, and intercepted a pass by quarterback Joe Webb during a 13–7 loss at the Buffalo Bills. The following week, he collected a career-high 11 combined tackles (three solo) in the Colts' 25–13 loss to the Broncos. Farley finished the 2017 season with 98 combined tackles (60 solo), seven pass deflections, and two interceptions in 16 games and 15 starts. Pro Football Focus gave Farley an overall grade of 82.2, ranking 24th among all qualified safeties in 2017.

==== 2018–2019 ====
In 2018, Farley was named the backup strong safety behind Clayton Geathers. He played in five games with one start before being placed on injured reserve on October 12, 2018 with shoulder, groin, and wrist injuries.

On August 26, 2019, Farley was released by the Colts.

=== New York Jets ===
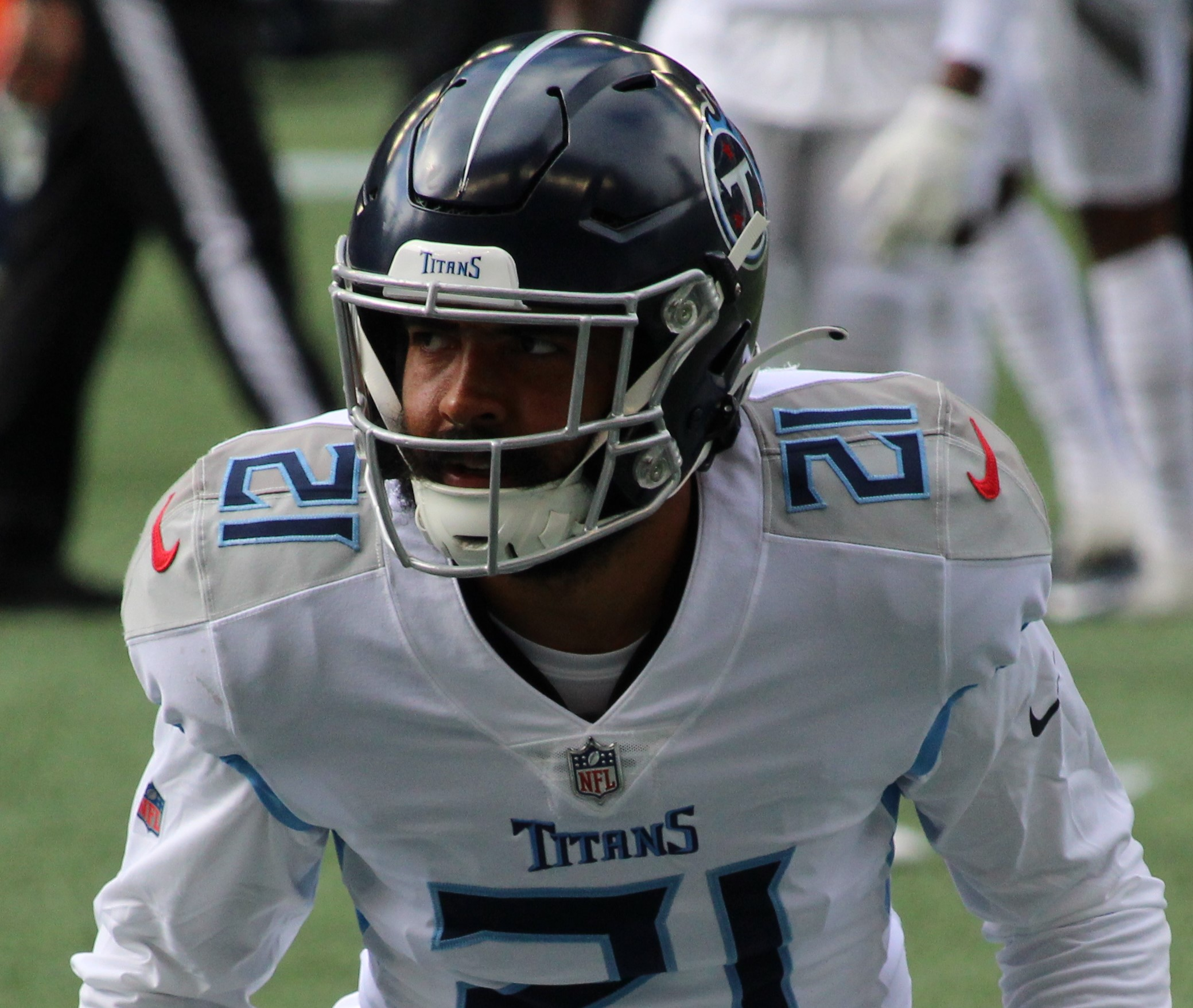
Farley with the Titans in 2021

On August 30, 2019, Farley signed with the New York Jets. Farley was released during final roster cuts on September 5, 2020, but was re-signed two days later.

=== Tennessee Titans ===
On March 30, 2021, Farley was signed by the Tennessee Titans to a one-year deal.

=== Las Vegas Raiders ===
On July 21, 2022, Farley was signed by the Las Vegas Raiders. He was waived on August 30, and signed to the practice squad the next day. Farley was elevated to the active roster in the first three game of the regular season, against Los Angeles Chargers, Cardinals and Titans, and reverted the next day to the practice squad. On September 29, the Raiders signed Farley to the active roster from the practice squad.

=== Carolina Panthers ===
On September 19, 2023, Farley was signed to the Carolina Panthers practice squad. He was promoted to the active roster on November 4. He was released on November 13. Farley was re-signed to the practice squad on November 28. He was not signed to a reserve/future contract and thus became a free agent at the end of the season upon the expiration of his practice squad contract.

== NFL career statistics ==
=== Regular season ===
Year	Team	Games		Tackles				Interceptions						Fumbles			
Year	Team	GP	GS	Comb	Total	Ast	Sack	PD	INT	Yds	Avg	Lng	TD	FF	FR	Yds	TD
2016	IND	16	0	11	8	3	0.0	0	0	0	0	0	0	0	0	0	0
2017	IND	16	15	98	60	38	0.0	7	2	9	4.5	9	0	1	1	0	0
2018	IND	5	1	19	8	8	0.0	4	1	7	7.0	7	0	1	0	0	0
2019	NYJ	13	0	6	5	1	0.0	0	0	0	0	0	0	0	0	0	0
2020	NYJ	16	2	24	10	11	0.0	3	0	0	0	0	0	0	0	0	0
2021	TEN	17	0	16	9	1	0.0	0	0	0	0	0	0	1	1	0	0
2022	LV	17	0	11	4	7	0.0	0	0	0	0	0	0	0	0	0	0
2023	CAR	5	1	9	1	8	0.0	0	0	0	0	0	0	0	0	0	0
Career		105	19	194	121	73	0.0	14	3	16	5.3	9	0	3	2	0	0

== Personal life ==
Farley was raised by his parents, Mark and Falinda Farley, and has four brothers and two sisters named Timon, Nathan, Charis, Kenan, Joy and Silas. He does charity work, kayaks, and plays the ukulele and kazoo. He also has a German shorthaired pointer named Harper.
