= Cádiz Stradivarius =

Antique violin

The Cádiz Stradivarius of 1722 is an antique violin fabricated by Italian luthier Antonio Stradivari (1644–1737) of Cremona. The instrument is named after the city Cádiz, Spain where it resided for eighty years. In 1946 it was acquired by American violinist Joseph Fuchs, and is currently owned by a private American foundation. The Cádiz is on loan to violinist Jennifer Frautschi.
