= Trevor Williams (violinist) =

British violinist & professor (1929–2007)

Trevor James Williams
- Born: 10 February 1929; Acton, London, UK
- Died: 11 May 2007 (aged 78)
- Occupation(s): Violinist, academic

Trevor James Williams (10 February 1929 – 11 May 2007) was a British violinist and professor at the Royal Academy of Music and at North Carolina University.

== Early life ==
Williams was born in Acton, West London, and educated at Latymer Upper School. Having taken up the violin as a young boy he was taught by Bhodan Hubicki and became a junior student at the Royal Academy of Music. When he won a scholarship to the senior academy he continued his studies with David Martin. He later received training from the Russian musician Sascha Lasserson.

== Career ==
After leaving the academy he was invited to join the Aeolian String Quartet with Sydney Humphries (violin), Watson Forbes (viola), and John Moore (cello), who was followed by Derek Simpson. Williams was appointed leader of the BBC Scottish Orchestra in 1963, and was later invited to be co-leader of the BBC Symphony Orchestra. He formed the Haffner String Quartet and became leader of the Tilford Bach Festival Ensemble and Orchestra. He was violin professor at the Royal Academy of Music (1959–63 and 1969–88) and also, for a shorter period, at the Royal College of Music.

== Performances ==
- Aeolian String Quartet
- Proms
- Radio3 1967-09-30

== Prizes ==
- J&A Beare's Prize
- One of runners up in the Carl Flesch International Violin Competition (1954)
