= Colburn School =

Private performing arts school in Los Angeles, California

- Type: Private
- Established: 1950; 76 years ago
- Accreditation: NASM
- President: Sel Kardan
- Location: Los Angeles, California, United States; 34°03′14″N 118°14′59″W
- Campus: Urban
- Website: colburnschool.edu

The Colburn School is a private performing arts school in Los Angeles with a focus on music and dance. It has four divisions: the Conservatory of Music, Music Academy, Community School of Performing Arts, and the Trudl Zipper Dance Institute. Founded in 1950, the school is named after its principal benefactor, Richard D. Colburn.

== History ==
The school was established in 1950 as a preparatory arm of the USC Thornton School of Music. Originally, it was across the street from the Shrine Auditorium, in a warehouse that was converted into extra USC practice rooms, rehearsal halls, and dance studios. It later broadened its mission and changed its name to the Community School of Performing Arts. In 1972, composer and conductor Herbert Zipper became the school's project director. Zipper encouraged businessman Richard D. Colburn to contribute funding. In 1980, the school finalized its split with USC and branched out on its own.

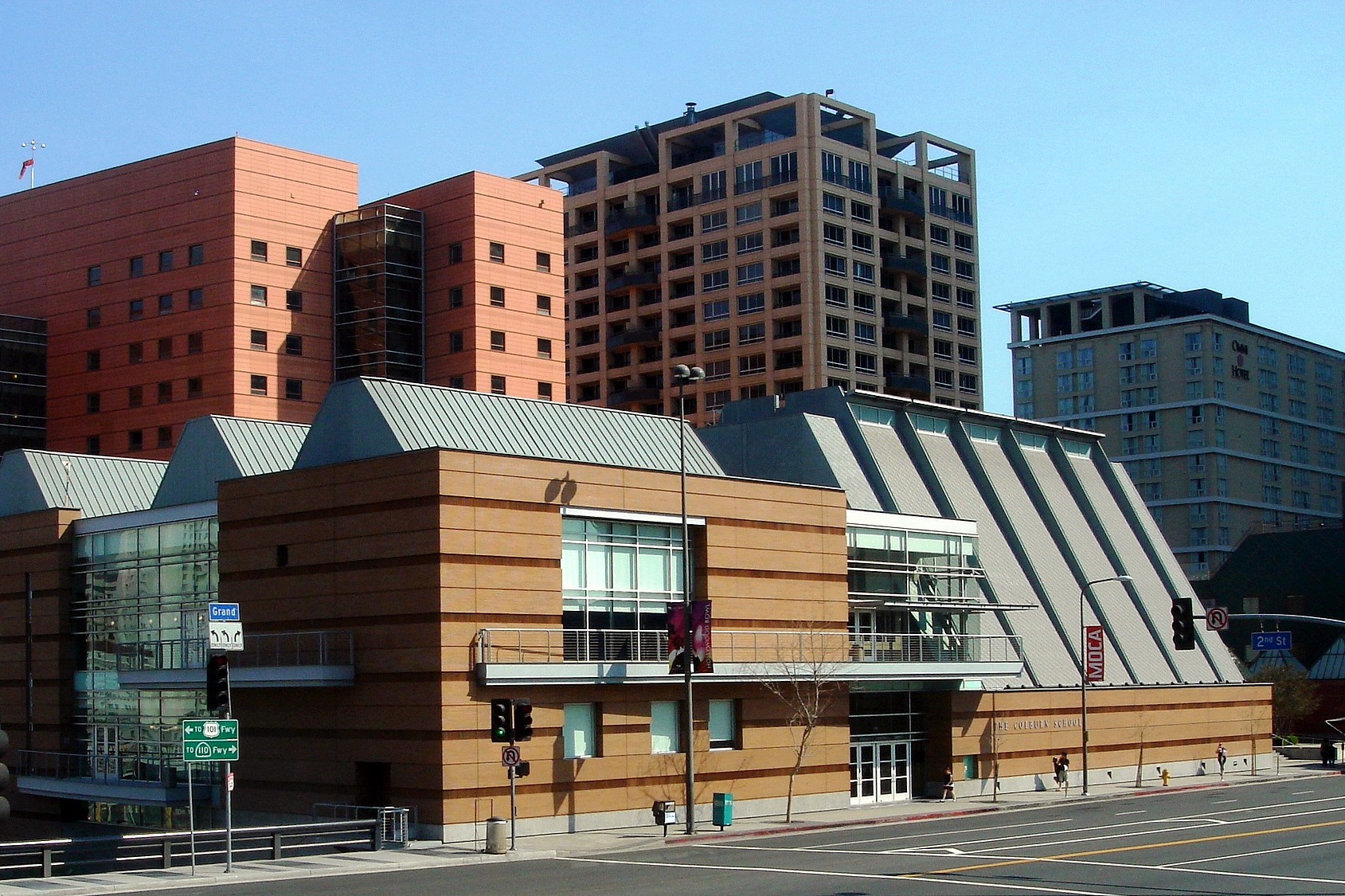
The Colburn School in 2007

The school received a significant endowment from Colburn in 1985 and was renamed in his honor. It moved to downtown Los Angeles in 1998. In 2003, the Colburn Conservatory of Music was established to provide tertiary music education with an all-scholarship model. In 2008, the Colburn Dance Institute was renamed the Trudl Zipper Dance Institute after a large anonymous donation in her memory. In 2010, the school opened the Colburn Music Academy, a program for young pre-collegiate musicians. In 2014, the Colburn Dance Academy launched as the pre-professional ballet program of the Trudl Zipper Dance Institute. Former New York City Ballet principal dancer Jenifer Ringer was appointed dean and Benjamin Millepied was named artistic advisor. Also in 2014, pianist Jean-Yves Thibaudet became the school's first artist-in-residence.

In 2019, the Colburn School established the Negaunee Conducting Program and appointed Esa-Pekka Salonen, a Finnish conductor and composer, to lead it. In 2024, the Negaunee Foundation made a $16.6 million donation in perpetuity to endow the program.

== Programs ==
The Conservatory of Music provides tertiary-level degree programs to students. Degrees offered are Bachelor of Music, Master of Music, Performance Diploma, Artist Diploma, and Professional Studies Certificate. All students receive a full scholarship, including housing and stipends. The Dean of the Conservatory is Lee Cioppa. The Conservatory is also home to the Negaunee Conducting Program. Led by Salonen, the program offers undergraduate and graduate conducting diplomas. In addition to working with various school ensembles, fellows join the conducting staff at the San Francisco Symphony and serve as assistant conductors to Salonen for his international engagements.

The Music Academy is the Colburn School's pre-collegiate division and teaches students aged 14 to 18. Its curriculum includes music theory, ear training, music history, and chamber music. The Community School of Performing Arts serves children under 18 and offers classes in piano, strings, woodwinds, brass, percussion, jazz, voice and choir, ensembles, and drama, among other disciplines. Its dean is Susan Cook. The Dance Academy is the Trudl Zipper Dance Institute's flagship program and is designed to prepare dancers aged 14 to 19 for professional careers. The curriculum focuses on classical ballet while also providing instruction in other styles. The dance academy's dean is Margaret Tracey.

== Admission ==
Admission to the Colburn Conservatory of Music is highly competitive. In an unidentified year, 26 out of 500 applicants were accepted, a 5% acceptance rate. About 120 students attend the Conservatory of Music and more than 1,700 take classes at the Community School of Performing Arts. About 50 students study at the Music Academy and 25 at the Dance Academy.

== Campus ==
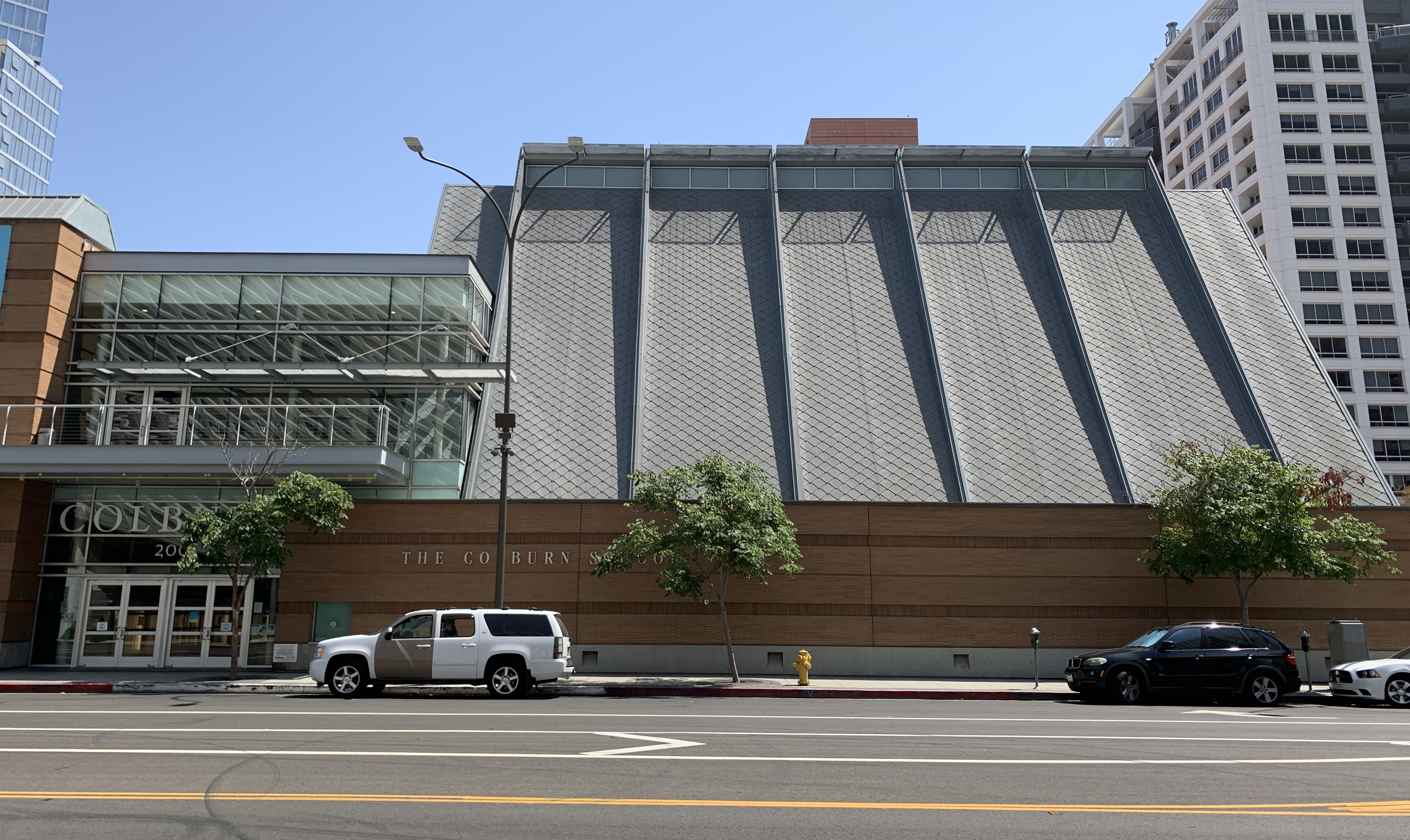
Zipper Hall

The Colburn School's main building was designed by the architectural firm Hardy Holzman Pfeiffer Associates. It includes the Lloyd Wright-designed studio of Jascha Heifetz. Originally in Heifetz's backyard, it was saved from demolition and rebuilt on the second floor of the school's Grand Avenue building. Also in the building is Zipper Hall, which hosts both professional and student performances throughout the year. The Los Angeles Philharmonic and Los Angeles Chamber Orchestra have both performed chamber music concerts there.

In 2016, the Colburn School bought an outdoor parking lot on the corner of 2nd and Olive Streets for $33 million. In 2022, plans were announced to build the Colburn Center on the site. Designed by Frank Gehry, its Kohl Hall – named for Pasadena philanthropists Terri and Jerry Kohl – is a 1,000-seat concert hall with acoustics by Yasuhisa Toyota, and a 100-seat theater in addition to four professional-size dance studios. The project broke ground in 2024 and is estimated to be completed in 2027.

== Notable people ==
=== Alumni ===
- Kris Bowers – composer and jazz pianist
- Calder Quartet – ensemble
- Calidore String Quartet – ensemble
- Robert Chen – violinist
- Billy Childs – composer and jazz pianist
- Danielle de Niese – soprano
- Lindsay Deutsch – violinist
- Tim Fain – violinist
- Aubrey Foard – tubist
- Grace Fong – pianist
- Jennifer Frautschi – violinist
- David Fung – pianist
- Anthony Gonzalez – actor
- José González Granero – clarinetist
- William Hagen – violinist
- Burt Hara – clarinetist
- Leila Josefowicz – violinist
- Tamaki Kawakubo – violinist
- Fabiola Kim – violinist
- Larry Klein – producer, songwriter and jazz bassist
- Amadéus Leopold – violinist
- Geneva Lewis – violinist
- Anne Akiko Meyers – violinist
- Miles Mosley – jazz bassist
- Nokuthula Ngwenyama – violist
- Blake Pouliot – violinist
- Eric Reed – jazz pianist
- Patrice Rushen – jazz pianist and R&B singer
- Julian Schwarz – cellist
- Albert Cano Smit – pianist
- Mikyung Sung – double bassist
- Thundercat – bassist and songwriter
- Michael Tilson Thomas – conductor
- Donald Vega – jazz pianist
- Viano Quartet – ensemble
- Paul Wiancko – composer and cellist

=== Faculty ===
- Ted Atkatz – percussion
- Andrew Bain – horn
- Harold Battiste – jazz
- Martin Beaver – violin and chamber music
- Fabio Bidini – piano
- Helen Callus – viola
- Paul Coletti – viola
- Alan de Veritch – viola
- Paul Ellison – double bass
- Silas Farley – dance
- Ariana Ghez – oboe
- Yehuda Gilad – clarinet
- Eugene Izotov – oboe
- Carla Körbes – dance
- Thomas Kotcheff – ear training and music theory
- Mark Lawrence – trombone
- Ronald Leonard – cello
- Ida Levin – chamber music
- Daniel Lewis - conducting
- Teng Li – viola
- Robert Lipsett – violin
- Tatjana Masurenko – viola
- Demarre McGill – flute
- Norman Pearson – tuba
- Elizabeth Pitcairn – violin
- Jenifer Ringer – dance
- Esa-Pekka Salonen – conducting
- Eleonore Schoenfeld – cello
- Ory Shihor – piano
- Scott St. John – chamber music
- Arnold Steinhardt – violin
- Melinda Sullivan – dance
- Janie Taylor – dance
- Margaret Tracey – dance
- JoAnn Turovsky – harp
- Donald Vega – jazz
- Allan Vogel – oboe
- Jim Walker – flute
- Geraldine Walther – chamber music
