= Violin Concerto (Walton) =

Violin concerto by William Walton

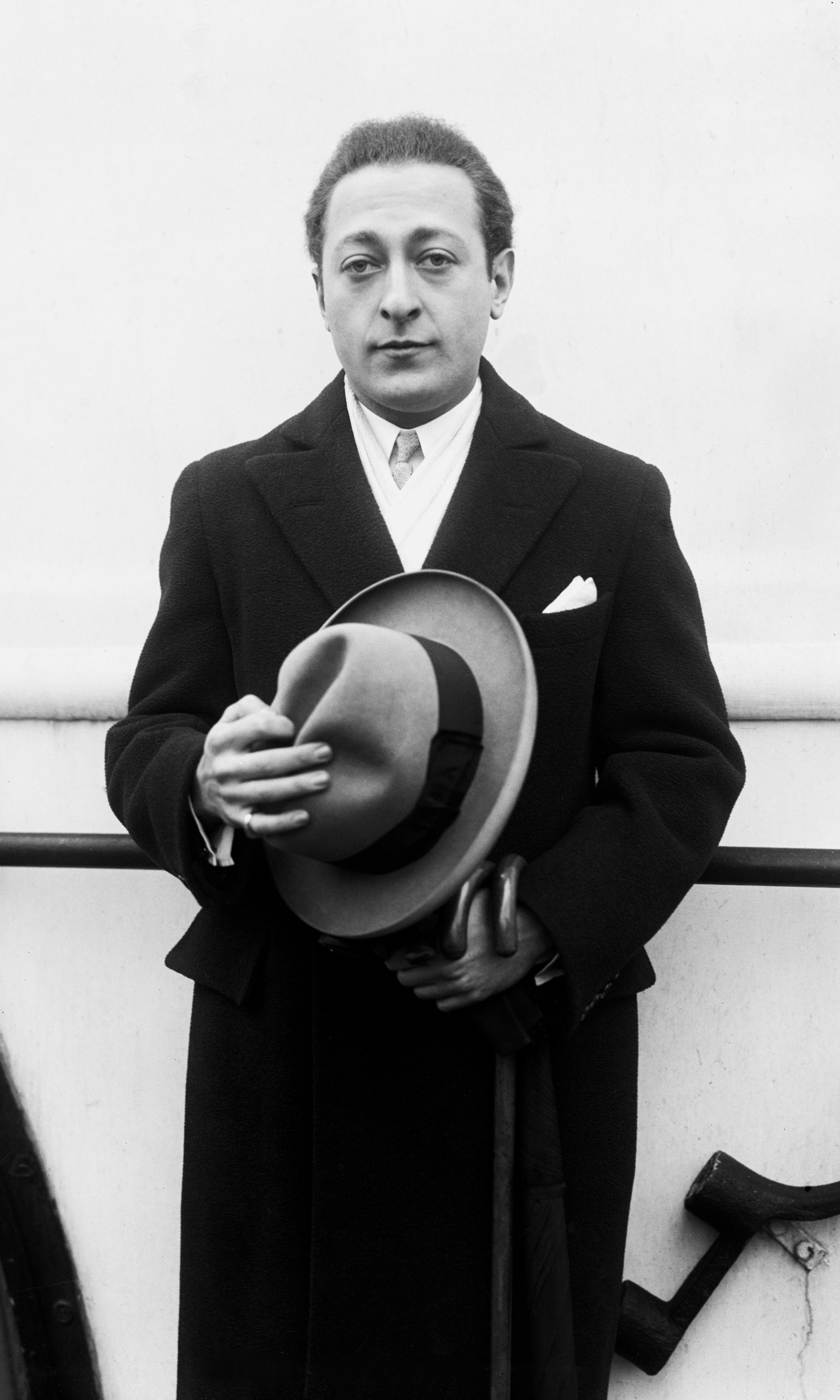
Jasha Heifetz (1920), who commissioned the violin concerto

The Violin Concerto by William Walton was written in 1938–39 and dedicated to Jascha Heifetz, who commissioned the work and performed it at its premiere on 7 December 1939 with the Cleveland Orchestra conducted by Artur Rodziński. The British premiere, delayed by the Second World War, was given on 1 November 1941, with Henry Holst as soloist and the composer conducting. Walton later reorchestrated the concerto; the revised version was premiered in 1944. The work has been frequently recorded and has established itself as one of the composer's most durable compositions.

== Background and first performances ==
By 1936 William Walton had established a position among the leading British composers of the day, but he was a slow and far from prolific worker and in that year he felt obliged to choose between accepting a commission from Jascha Heifetz or one from Joseph Szigeti and Benny Goodman, who wanted a work for violin and clarinet. (Note: When Walton declined the commission Szigeti and Goodman approached Béla Bartók, who obliged with Contrasts.) After meeting Heifetz in London, Walton accepted a commission for a concerto, but he did not begin work on the piece until early 1938, when he went with his partner, Alice Wimborne, to Ravello, where he worked on the concerto for several months. During the course of composition he was bitten by a tarantula and marked the incident by incorporating a tarantella into the work in a passage he called "quite gaga, I may say, and of doubtful propriety". In mid-1939 he visited Heifetz in New York to work on the piece together, incorporating the violinist's suggestions for making the solo part as effective as possible.

The British Council hoped to present the premiere of the concerto during the 1939 New York World's Fair, along with new works by Ralph Vaughan Williams, Arthur Bliss and Arnold Bax given during the event, but Heifetz was otherwise committed on the proposed date of the concert. It was agreed that he should premiere the work in Boston, with Walton conducting the Boston Symphony Orchestra, and then, after several more performances in the US, Heifetz would give the British premiere in London in March 1940. The outbreak of the Second World War in September 1939 forced Heifetz and Walton to abandon their plans. Walton could not travel to the US, and the world premiere of the concerto was given by Heifetz and the Cleveland Orchestra conducted by Artur Rodziński on 7 December 1939. The same performers introduced the work to New York at Carnegie Hall in February 1941.

The contract between composer and soloist gave Heifetz the exclusive rights to the concerto for two years, but as he could not travel to Britain he waived them to allow the work to be given there. In November 1941, at a Royal Philharmonic Society concert at the Royal Albert Hall, Walton conducted the first British performance, with the soloist Henry Holst, former leader of the Berlin Philharmonic Orchestra, who had settled in England. Walton later revised the orchestration, in particular reducing the number of percussion instruments. This revised version was first performed on 17 January 1944, in Wolverhampton, by Holst and the Liverpool Philharmonic Orchestra conducted by Malcolm Sargent.

== Musical structure ==
The concerto takes about thirty minutes in performance. The revised version is scored for violin solo; 2 flutes (second doubling piccolo); 2 oboes (second doubling cor anglais); 2 clarinets; 2 bassoons; 4 horns; 2 trumpets in B-flat; 3 trombones; timpani; 2 percussion (side drum; cymbals; tambourine; xylophone); harp and strings. The original instrumentation also included bass drum, castanets, glockenspiel and gong.

=== I. Andante tranquillo ===
As in Walton's earlier Viola Concerto, the first movement is the slowest of the three. It is predominantly lyrical and in an unambiguous B minor. The solo violin launches straight into the main theme after a brief rhymical orchestral opening which pervades the whole movement. The movement is not in strict sonata form but does not depart markedly from it, and the second subject is a quiet and flowing melody for strings and woodwind. The opening theme, marked "sognando" – dreamily – is developed in a variety of moods (the analyst Christopher Palmer calls them "an extraordinary number of personality changes") before a written cadenza, and a concluding recapitulation of the opening melody, with brief reappearances of the secondary theme.

=== II. Presto capriccioso alla napolitana ===
The second movement is the concerto's scherzo and trio. Unlike the first movement, its key is not clear from the outset, and remains ambiguous in the fast-moving sections. The opening presto requires extreme virtuosity from the soloist – Palmer points to harmonics followed by pizzicati in a fast-moving two-in-a-bar). The intermittent tarantella rhythm gives way to a subsidiary waltz-like theme. The first section eases into the trio, a canzonetta introduced by a solo horn. The analyst Frank Howes notes that Walton disliked identical repetitions of a theme, and at each reappearance the gentle theme of the canzonetta starts on different beats of the bar, changing the rhymical emphasis of the melody. The scherzo returns, and after the cellos repeat the horn theme from the start of the canzonetta the movement ends quietly.

=== III. Vivace ===
The rondo finale has three main subjects. Both Howes and Palmer describe the first as "gruff" and the second as "shrill". The first is played by the lower strings, joined by the bassoons and clarinets in a march-like theme, in which the soloist joins. The third theme is lyrical and there is a continuing contrast between the two elements. The solo violin then plays a variant of the opening theme of the first movement, with the first theme of the finale now serving as its ostinato accompaniment, before an accompanied cadenza and a final alla marcia.

== Critical reception ==
Walton was keenly aware at the time when he was composing the concerto that musical fashion seemed to be turning against him:

Today's white hope is tomorrow's black sheep. These days it is very sad for a composer to grow old – unless, that is, he grows old enough to witness a revival of his work. I seriously advise all sensitive composers to die at the age of 37. I know: I've gone through the first halcyon periods, and am just about ripe for my critical damnation.

Rodziński, conductor of the premiere, considered the piece "absolutely one of the finest violin concertos ever written", but when the work had its British premiere The Times was non-committal about whether it matched Walton's Viola Concerto, and thought it "perhaps a little lacking in originality" though praising its "haunting affinity" with Elgar's Violin Concerto. A 1946 study of contemporary British music described the Violin Concerto as failing to match the spiritual depth of Walton's Symphony composed a decade earlier, and not quite achieving a satisfactory balance between "the sensual and intellectual appeal of his music". More recently, opinion has generally been more favourable. A 1994 survey described the concerto as "most attractive of all Walton's music". In the 2001 edition of Grove's Dictionary of Music and Musicians, Byron Adams writes, "The Violin Concerto is an ingenious reconciliation of the demands of virtuosity and Romantic expressiveness. … it shares the same basic formal plan of the Viola Concerto, consisting of a fleet scherzo flanked by two larger movements. The orchestral colour of the Violin Concerto, however, is brighter than that of the earlier work, the themes more extroverted and the harmonies more luscious." In a 2014 analysis published by the BBC the concerto is ranked with the Viola Concerto, Belshazzar's Feast and the First Symphony as one of the "large-scale masterpieces on which … Walton's reputation securely rests".

== Recordings ==
Soloist	Orchestra	Conductor	Year
Jascha Heifetz	Cincinnati Symphony	Eugene Goossens	1942
Henry Holst	BBC Northern Orchestra	Charles Groves	1947
Jascha Heifetz	Philharmonia	William Walton	1950
Aldo Ferraresi	Royal Philharmonic Orchestra	William Walton	1955
Zino Francescatti	Philadelphia	Eugene Ormandy	1959
Aldo Ferraresi	Orchestra Sinfonica RAI Milan	Milton Forstat	1961
Iona Brown	London Symphony	Edward Downes	1967
Yehudi Menuhin	London Symphony	William Walton	1969
Kyung Wha Chung	London Symphony	André Previn	1972
Ida Haendel	Bournemouth Symphony	Paavo Berglund	1977
Steven Staryk	National Arts Centre Orchestra	Mario Bernardi	1981
Nigel Kennedy	Royal Philharmonic	André Previn	1987
Lydia Mordkovitch	London Philharmonic	Jan Latham-Koenig	1991
Aaron Rosand	Florida Philharmonic	James Judd	1991
Salvatore Accardo	London Symphony	Richard Hickox	1991
Tasmin Little	Bournemouth Symphony	Andrew Litton	1994
Joshua Bell	Baltimore Symphony	David Zinman	1997
Dong-Suk Kang	English Northern Philharmonia	Paul Daniel	1997
Camilla Wicks	Oslo Philharmonic	Yuri Simonov	2000
James Ehnes	Vancouver Symphony	Bramwell Tovey	2006
Serguei Azizian	Copenhagen Philharmonic	Giordano Bellincampi	2006
Akiko Suwanai	City of Birmingham Symphony	Sakari Oramo	2008
Kurt Nikkanen	New Haven Symphony	William Boughton	2010
Thomas Bowes	Malmö Opera	Joseph Swensen	2011
Tasmin Little	BBC Symphony	Edward Gardner	2014
Anthony Marwood	BBC Scottish Symphony	Martyn Brabbins	2017
Lorraine McAslan	BBC Concert Orchestra	Martin Yates	2017
Fabiola Kim	Munich Symphony	Kevin John Edusei	2019
Liya Petrova	Royal Philharmonic	Duncan Ward	2023

== Notes, references and sources ==
=== Sources ===
- Boyden, Matthew; Jonathan Buckley (1994). Classical Music on CD: The Rough Guide. London: Rough Guides. ISBN 978-1-85828-113-1.
- Craggs, Stewart (1990). William Walton: A Catalogue. Oxford and New York: Oxford University Press. ISBN 978-0-19-315474-2.* Howes, Frank (1973). The Music of William Walton (second ed.). London: Oxford University Press. ISBN 978-0-19-315431-5.
- Kennedy, Michael (1989). Portrait of Walton. Oxford: Oxford University Press. ISBN 978-0-19-816705-1.
- Mason, Colin (1946). "William Walton". In A. L. Bacharach (ed.). British Music of Our Time. London: Penguin. OCLC 1036801083.
