= Jennifer Frautschi =

American musician

- Born: 1973 (age 52–53); Pasadena, California, U.S.
- Genres: Classical
- Occupation: Musician
- Instrument: Violin
- Website: www.jenniferfrautschi.com

Jennifer Frautschi (/ˈfraʊtʃi/; born 1973) is an American violinist. A recipient of an Avery Fisher Career Grant, she is artist-in-Residence at Stony Brook University. She plays a 1722 Antonio Stradivari violin known as the "ex-Cadiz", on loan from a private American foundation.

== Biography ==
Frautschi was born in Pasadena, California, and began to play the violin at age three. She studied with Robert Lipsett at the Colburn School and later attended Harvard University, the New England Conservatory, and the Juilliard School, where she studied with Robert Mann.

Frautschi won top prizes at the Queen Elisabeth Competition and the Naumburg International Violin Competition in New York, and received an Avery Fisher Career Grant in 1999. She has appeared as a soloist with the Los Angeles Philharmonic and Pierre Boulez, Chicago Symphony Orchestra and Christoph Eschenbach at the Ravinia Festival, Minnesota Orchestra and Osmo Vänskä, Cincinnati Symphony Orchestra, Seattle Symphony Orchestra, Milwaukee Symphony Orchestra, Kansas City Symphony, Utah Symphony, Louisville Orchestra, San Diego Symphony, and the Orchestra of the Teatro di San Carlo.

In 2004, Frautschi made her recital debut at Carnegie Hall in New York. In Europe, she has appeared at venues such as the Wigmore Hall in London, Mozarteum in Salzburg, Concertgebouw in Amsterdam, Konzerthaus in Vienna, and Cité de la Musique in Paris. She has also played with operas and festivals including the Imperial Garden in Beijing, La Monnaie in Brussels, La Chaux-de-Fonds in Switzerland, and San Miguel de Allende Festival in Mexico.

In 2008–2009 she toured the US for three weeks with the Czech National Symphony Orchestra. In 2010–2011 she performed with the Rhode Island Philharmonic Orchestra and the Phoenix Symphony Orchestra and toured the UK with musicians from Prussia Cove.

Frautschi has released recordings on Artek, including an orchestral debut recording of the Prokofiev concerti with Gerard Schwarz and the Seattle Symphony Orchestra, and on NAXOS, including a recording of Schoenberg's Concerto for String Quartet and Orchestra, which earned a Grammy nomination, and the Stravinsky Violin Concerto with the Philharmonia Orchestra of London.

== Reception ==
The Kansas City Star wrote, "Frautschi possesses a lush, florid tone, a sure musical sense and a forthright knowledge of where she wants to go with any given phrase".

== Personal life ==
Frautschi's father is the theoretical physicist Steven Frautschi.
