= Jenifer Ringer =

American ballet dancer

- Born: Jenifer Ellen Ringer; 1972 or 1973 (age 53–54); New Bern, North Carolina
- Education: School of American Ballet; Fordham University (BA)
- Occupations: ballet dancer; educator
- Spouse: James Fayette (m. 2000)
- Children: 2
- Career
- Former groups: New York City Ballet; Colburn Dance Academy

Jenifer Ellen Ringer (born 1972 or 1973) is an American ballet dancer and educator. She joined the New York City Ballet in 1990, became a principal dancer in 2000, and retired from performing in 2014. She then became the director of the Colburn School's professional dance program, Colburn Dance Academy. She was named Dean of the Colburn's Trudl Zipper Dance Institute in 2017, before stepping down in 2021.

== Early life ==
Ringer was born in New Bern, North Carolina to a marine biologist who worked at the Naval Criminal Investigative Service and a nurse. She was raised in Summerville, South Carolina, as an Evangelical Christian. She tried ballet at a young age but was uninterested, but when she attended another class at age 10, she decided to continue. Her family relocated to West Springfield, Virginia when she was 12, and she started pre-professional training at the Washington School of Ballet. Her teachers there included Goh Choo San. In 1987, the school's founder, Mary Day, handpicked Ringer to perform Balanchine's Serenade with The Washington Ballet, and Ringer later said that performance led her to pursue a career in dance. The following year, the family moved to New York. Ringer attended a summer intensive at the School of American Ballet, then stayed as a full-time student on scholarship. During this time, she often performed with the New York City Ballet to replace injured dancers.

== Career ==
Ringer became an apprentice with the New York City Ballet in October 1989, then joined the corps de ballet the following year. In 1994, she made her debut as the Sugar Plum Fairy in Balanchine's The Nutcracker, and was promoted to soloist in January the following year.

In her early dance career, she struggled with weight and had anorexia then bulimia. She recalled Peter Martins told her to "stop eating cheesecake," and by 1997 she was 40 pounds (18 kg) heavier than most dancers. In 1997, the company and she agreed that she should leave the company. She stopped dancing completely and held different jobs. Eventually, a former teacher convinced her to start taking ballet classes again. Ringer also became involved with her faith, Protestant Christianity, from which she had disconnected herself in her teens, and attended Overeaters Anonymous, both of which she credited with helping her comeback. She returned to the company in 1998.

Ringer was promoted to principal dancer in 2000. She performed lead roles in works by George Balanchine and Jerome Robbins, and created roles for choreographers including Twyla Tharp, Helgi Tomasson, Alexei Ratmansky, and Christopher Wheeldon. She was featured in the web series city.ballet. In both her memoir and in interviews, she credits her religious faith with helping her return to the top of a field, she says, “where ballet is [often] god," existing as a false idol.

In 2010, when reviewing Ringer in The Nutcracker, New York Times critic Alastair Macaulay wrote that she "looked as if she'd eaten one sugarplum too many.. and Jared Angle, the Cavalier, seems to have been sampling half the Sweet realm.” The comment was regarded as body shaming. Ringer was immediately defended by ballet bloggers and on online boards, and the controversy led to her appearances on The Oprah Winfrey Show and The Today Show. On the latter, she said, "As a dancer, I do put myself out there to be criticized, and my body is part of my art form," and noted she is not overweight. In an interview in 2014, she said, she "was able to dismiss it within about 15 minutes, which was a huge personal triumph."

In October 2013, the New York City Ballet announced that Ringer would retire in February the following year. In her last performance, she appeared as the Pink Girl in Robbins' Dances at a Gathering and the Pearly Queen in Balanchine's Union Jack. Ringer's memoir, Dancing Through It, was published in February 2014.

After she retired from dancing, Ringer relocated to Los Angeles to become the director of the Colburn School's new professional dance program, Colburn Dance Academy. In 2017, she was named Dean of the Colburn's Trudl Zipper Dance Institute, overseeing all dance programs. In February 2021, it was announced that Ringer would step down from the Colburn School in July, and return to her home state of South Carolina, but intended to return to teach frequently. She was succeeded by former New York City Ballet dancer Silas Farley.

== Personal life ==
In 1997, Ringer graduated summa cum laude from Fordham University with a BA in English.

In 2000, Ringer married James Fayette, also a New York City Ballet dancer. They have two children.

Though raised as an Evangelical Christian, Ringer had "always considered" herself a Protestant Christian. In New York, she went to an Episcopal Church, and a Presbyterian Church after she married Fayette.
