= Yehuda Gilad (musician) =

Yehuda Gilad (Hebrew: יהודה גלעד) is a professor of clarinet at the University of Southern California's Thornton School of Music and the Colburn School of Music.

== Education ==
Gilad was born and raised in Kibbutz Gan Shmuel. His former teachers include Mitchell Lurie, Herbert Zipper, and Giora Feidman. In addition, Mr. Gilad participated in numerous masterclasses with Sergiu Celibidache and Leonard Bernstein.

== Performing, Conducting and Teaching ==
Yehuda Gilad aims to integrate performing, conducting and teaching into every aspect of his music artistry. As a conductor, performer and professor, he strives for "total musicianship". In addition to his positions as professor of clarinet at the University of Southern California's Thornton School of Music and at Colburn, Mr. Gilad is regularly invited to present masterclasses and performances at music conservatories and festivals worldwide. He has been invited to such institutions as the Winter Festival in Spain, the Curtis Institute, the Mannes College, Juilliard, Sibelius, Royal College of Music in Stockholm, Norwegian Academy of Music, Beijing Conservatory, the Manhattan School of Music, inter alia.

An accomplished clarinetist, Mr. Gilad has performed at the Marlboro Music Festival, Bowdoin Music Festival, San Francisco Chamber Music Festival, Crusell Music Festival and Santa Barbara's Music Academy of the West. He has collaborated as a performer and conductor with many prominent artists including Gil Shaham, Sarah Chang, Joseph Kalichstein, Vladimir Feltsman, Joshua Bell, Cho-Liang Lin and many others.

From 1982-1993, Mr. Gilad served as director of the Malibu Strawberry Creek Music Festival. Mr. Gilad also founded the Yoav Chamber Ensemble, which performed at the Merkin and Carnegie Recital Halls, and the Colburn Woodwind Chamber Players, which toured Germany, China and major cities throughout the U.S.

As a conductor, Mr. Gilad served as conductor and music director of the now dissolved Colonial Symphony of New Jersey. Since his appointment to the Colonial Symphony in 1988, Mr. Gilad has received critical acclaim from The New York Times for his "strong imaginative programming" and championing of American and contemporary music. As noted in an article in The StarLedger, Gilad has "transformed the Colonial Symphony into one of New Jersey's artistic trendsetters." Under his leadership, the orchestra became the only one in the area to receive an NEA grant for seven consecutive years. In 1995 and 1996, the orchestra received the Distinguished Arts Organization Award from the New Jersey State Council on the Arts for it artistry and programming merits. As a staunch advocate of arts education, Mr. Gilad has elevated the Colonial Symphony into not only a premiere regional orchestra, but also a teaching orchestra, taking it "on the road" to various urban and suburban schools, integrating the orchestra into the schools' curriculum. Mr. Gilad is currently the music director of the Colburn Orchestra. He is a frequent guest conductor on four continents. He has also conducted the Idyllwild Arts Academy, the Santa Monica Symphony, the Bonn Sinfonietta (Germany), the Jerusalem Music Center (Israel), the Herbert Zipper Orchestra of Los Angeles, and the 20th Century Unlimited Concert Series in Santa Fe, New Mexico

In 1987, Mr. Gilad became the first Israeli-born conductor to perform in China, and he has since conducted numerous times in Beijing and Shanghai.

== Awards ==
Mr. Gilad has earned accolades including the Distinguished Teacher Award from the White House Commission on Presidential Scholars, the Teacher of the Year Award from the Colburn School, the America-Israel Cultural Foundation Scholarship, and the Robert Simon Award in Music.

Mr. Gilad has also appeared on various broadcasts aired on NBC, CBS, WQXR, WMTR, KUSC, NJN, Cablevision, and the national television of mainland China.
