= Parker Quartet =

String quartet in the United States

- Origin: Boston, Massachusetts, United States
- Genre: Classical
- Occupation: String quartet
- Instruments: 2 violins, 1 viola, 1 cello
- Years active: 2002–present
- Labels: Naxos, ECM
- Members: Daniel Chong, violin I Ken Hamao, violin II; Jessica Bodner, viola Kee-Hyun Kim, cello

The Parker Quartet is a string quartet, formed in 2002 in Boston, Massachusetts. The quartet has since travelled to multiple cities, and is currently in residence at Harvard University.

== History ==
The Parker Quartet was founded in 2002 at the New England Conservatory, and enrolled in the Professional String Quartet Program during 2006–2008. They held residencies as artists-in-residence at the University of St. Thomas, quartet-in-residence at the University of Minnesota, quartet-in-residence with the St. Paul Chamber Orchestra, and artists-in-residence with Minnesota Public Radio before becoming the current Blodgett Artists-in-Residence at Harvard University's Department of Music as professors of the practice, as well as quartet-in-residence at the University of South Carolina.

== Members ==
- Daniel Chong, violin 1
- Ken Hamao, violin 2
- Jessica Bodner, viola
- Kee-Hyun Kim, cello

== Awards ==
The Parker Quartet have won the Concert Artists Guild Competition in 2005, Grand Prix and Mozart Prize at Bordeaux International String Quartet Competition (now the Vibre! Festival) in 2005, and Chamber Music America’s Cleveland Quartet Award in 2009. Their recording of György Ligeti quartets on Naxos Records won a Grammy Award for Best Chamber Music Performance in 2011.

== Recordings ==
- György Kurtág and Antonín Dvořák with Kim Kashkashian (2021) ECM Records
- Beethoven: String Quartets op. 18, 59, 74 (2019) Festival Printemps des Arts de Monte-Carlo
- Mendelssohn: String Quartets op. 44 nos. 1 & 3 (2016) Nimbus Records
- Augusta Read Thomas: Of Being is a Bird (2016) Nimbus Records
- Jeremy Gill: Capriccio (2015) Innova Recordings
- Ligeti: String Quartets Nos. 1 & 2 (2009) Naxos Records
- Bartók: String Quartets Nos. 2 & 5 (2008) Zig Zag Records
