= 1920 in music =

This is a list of notable events in music that took place in the year 1920.

== Specific locations ==
- 1920 in British music
- 1920 in Scandinavian music

== Specific genres ==
- 1920 in country music
- 1920 in jazz

== Events ==
- January 19 – The Salzburg Festival is revived.
- September 4 – City of Birmingham Orchestra (England) first rehearses (in a city police bandroom). Later this month, its first concert, conducted by Appleby Matthews, opens with Granville Bantock's overture Saul; in November it gives its "First Symphony Concert" when Edward Elgar conducts a programme of his own music in Birmingham Town Hall.
- November 15 – First complete public performance of Gustav Holst's suite The Planets given in London by the London Symphony Orchestra conducted by Albert Coates.
- December 4 – Première of the opera Die tote Stadt by 23-year-old Erich Wolfgang Korngold. It later becomes known that the librettist, "Paul Schott", is Korngold's father Julius.
- December 30 – Pearl Hamilton (later with the Three X Sisters), plays piano with small jazz ensemble to appreciative audience at the Star Theater in New York City.
- Mamie Smith's first blues recordings become a hit, alerting record companies to the African American market.
- Hamilton Harty is appointed resident conductor of the Hallé Orchestra.
- Henri Sauguet forms Groupe des Trois (the Group of Three) along with Louis Emié and Jean-Marcel Lizotte.
- The Central Band of the Royal Air Force is formed in Britain.
- The Royal Concertgebouw Orchestra launches its Mahler festival.
- Gabriel Fauré retires from the Paris Conservatoire, and is awarded the Grand-Croix of the Légion d'Honneur.

== Publications ==
- Stewart Macpherson – Melody and Harmony, Book 1. London: Stainer & Bell.

== Published popular music ==
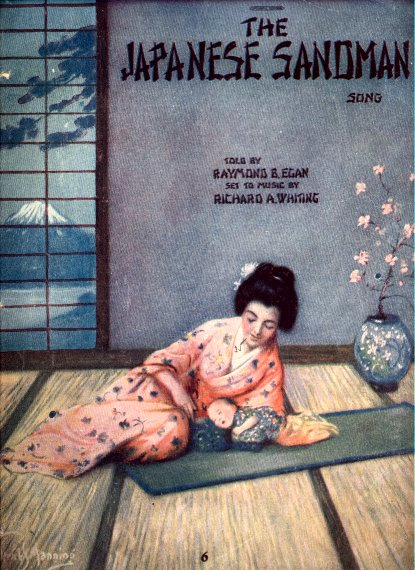
The Japanese Sandman

- "After You Get What You Want, You Don't Want It" w.m. Irving Berlin
- "All She'd Say Was "Umh Hum"" w.m. King Zany, Mac Emery, Gus Van & Joe Schenck
- "All The Boys Love Mary" Gus Van & Joe Schenck
- "Aunt Hagar's Blues" w.m. W. C. Handy
- "Avalon" w.m. B. G. DeSylva, Al Jolson & Vincent Rose
- "Blue Jeans" w. Harry D. Kerr, m. Lou Traveller
- "Bright Eyes" w. Harry B. Smith m. Otto Motzan & M. K. Jerome
- "Broadway Blues w. Arthur Swanstrom m. Carey Morgan
- "Chanson" m. Rudolf Friml
- "Chili Bean" w. Lew Brown m. Albert Von Tilzer
- "Crazy Blues" w.m. Percy Bradford
- "The Cuckoo Waltz" w. Arthur Kingsley m. J. E. Jonasson
- "Daddy, You've Been A Mother To Me" w.m. Fred Fisher
- "Down By The O-HI-O (I've Got The Sweetest Little O, My ! O ! )" w. Jack Yellen m. Abe Olman
- "Feather Your Nest" w.m. James Kendis, James Brockman & Howard Johnson
- "The Gipsy Warned Me" w.m. R. P. Weston & Bert Lee
- "He Went In Like A Lion (And Came Out Like A Lamb)" w. Andrew B. Sterling m. Harry von Tilzer
- "Home Again Blues" w.m. Harry Akst & Irving Berlin
- "I Belong to Glasgow" w.m. Will Fyffe
- "I Used To Love You, But It's All Over Now" w. Lew Brown m. Albert Von Tilzer
- "I'd Love To Fall Asleep And Wake Up In My Mammy's Arms" w. Sam M. Lewis & Joe Young m. Fred E. Ahlert
- "I'll Be With You In Apple Blossom Time" w. Neville Fleason m. Albert Von Tilzer
- "I'll See You In C-U-B-A" w.m. Irving Berlin
- "In a Persian Market" m. Albert William Ketèlbey
- "The Japanese Sandman" w. Raymond B. Egan m. Richard A. Whiting
- "Jellybean" by Jimmie Dupre, Sam Rosen, and Joe Verges

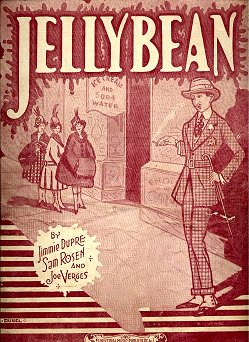
Jellybean

- "Kalua" w. Anne Caldwell m. Jerome Kern
- "La Veeda" w. Nat Vincent m. John Alden
- "Left All Alone Again Blues" w. Anne Caldwell m. Jerome Kern
- "Little Town In The Ould County Down" w. Richard Pascoe m. Monte Carlo & Alma Saunders
- "Look for the Silver Lining" w. B. G. DeSylva m. Jerome Kern
- "The Love Boat" by Gene Buck
- "Love Nest" w. Otto Harbach m. Louis A. Hirsch
- "Margie" w. Benny Davis m. Con Conrad & J. Russel Robinson
- "Mary" w. Otto Harbach m. Louis A. Hirsch
- "My Little Bimbo Down On A Bamboo Isle" w. Grant Clarke w. Walter Donaldson
- "My Mammy" w. Sam M. Lewis & Joe Young m. Walter Donaldson
- "My Man" w. (Eng) Channing Pollock (Fr) Albert Willemetz & Jacques Charles m. Maurice Yvain
- "O'er The Hills To Ardentinny" w.m. Harry Lauder
- "Old Pal Why Don't You Answer Me" w. Sam M. Lewis & Joe Young m. M. K. Jerome
- "Pale Moon" w. Jesse Glick m. Frederick Knight Logan
- "Palesteena" w.m. Con Conrad & J. Russell Robinson
- "Polly" w. Leo Wood m. Jack Richmond
- "Pretty Kitty Kelly" w. Harry Pease m. Ed G. Nelson
- "Rose Of Washington Square" w. Ballard MacDonald m. James F. Hanley
- "San" w.m. Lindsay McPhail & Walter Michels
- "So Long, Oo Long" w. Bert Kalmar m. Harry Ruby
- "That Old Irish Mother Of Mine" w. William Jerome m. Harry Von Tilzer
- "Wang Wang Blues" w. Leo Wood m. Gus Mueller, Buster Johnson & Henry Busse
- "When My Baby Smiles At Me" w. Andrew B. Sterling m. Billy Munro
- "Where Do They Go When They Row, Row, Row?" w. Bert Kalmar & George Jessel, m. Harry Ruby
- "Whispering" w. Malvin Schonberger m. John Schonberger
- "White Army, Black Baron" w. Pavel Grigor'ev, m. Samuel Pokrass
- "Whose Baby Are You?" w. Anne Caldwell m. Jerome Kern
- "Wild Rose" w. Clifford Grey m. Jerome Kern
- "A Young Man's Fancy" w. John Murray Anderson & Jack Yellen m. Milton Ager

== Top Popular Recordings 1920 ==
The following songs achieved the highest positions in Joel Whitburn's Pop Memories 1890-1954 and record sales reported on the "Discography of American Historical Recordings" website during 1920: Numerical rankings are approximate, they are only used as a frame of reference.

Rank	Artist	Title	Label	Recorded	Released	Chart Positions
1	Selvin's Novelty Orchestra	"Dardanella"	Victor 18633	November 20, 1919	January 1920	US Billboard 1920 #1, US #1 for 13 weeks, 24 total weeks, 1-6 million sold
2	Paul Whiteman and His Ambassador Orchestra	"Whispering"	Victor 18690	August 23, 1920	November 1920	US Billboard 1920 #2, US #1 for 11 weeks, 20 total weeks, National Recording Registry 2019, 2,000,000 sales
3	Al Jolson	"Swanee"	Columbia 2884	January 9, 1920	April 1920	US Billboard 1920 #3, US #1 for 9 weeks, 18 total weeks, National Recording Registry 2004
4	Ted Lewis and His Band	"When My Baby Smiles at Me"	Columbia 2908	January 12, 1920	April 1920	US Billboard 1920 #4, US #1 for 7 weeks, 18 total weeks
5	John Steel	"The Love Nest"	Victor 24871	November 9, 1920	November 24, 1920	US Billboard 1920 #5, US #1 for 7 weeks, 12 total weeks
6	Art Hickman and His Orchestra	"Hold Me"	Columbia 2899	September 25, 1919	May 1920	US Billboard 1920 #6, US #1 for 3 weeks, 14 total weeks
7	Marion Harris	"St. Louis Blues"	Victor 24871	February 15, 1920	April 1920	US Billboard 1920 #7, US #1 for 3 weeks, 14 total weeks
8	Paul Whiteman and His Ambassador Orchestra	"The Japanese Sandman"	Victor 18690	August 23, 1920	November 1920	US Billboard 1920 #8, US #1 for 3 weeks, 14 total weeks
9	Al Jolson	"I've Got My Captain Working for Me Now"	Columbia 2794	September 15, 1919	December 1919	US Billboard 1920 #9, US #1 for 2 weeks, 7 total weeks
10	Art Hickman and His Orchestra	"The Love Nest"	Columbia 2955	June 11, 1920	September 1920	US Billboard 1920 #10, US #1 for 2 weeks, 6 total weeks
11	Edith Day (Rosario Bourdon Orchestra)	"Alice Blue Gown"	Victor 45176	January 26, 1920	April 1920	US Billboard 1920 #11, US #1 for 1 weeks, 9 total weeks
34	Isham Jones Rainbo Orchestra	"Kismet"	Brunswick 5021	June 1, 1920	September 1920	US Billboard 1920 #34, US #4 for 1 weeks, 5 total weeks

== Classical music ==
- Granville Bantock – Arabian Nights
- Béla Bartók – Eight Improvisations on Peasant Songs
- Arnold Bax – Phantasy for viola and orchestra
- Arthur Bliss – The Tempest, overture and interludes;
  - Concerto for piano, tenor voice, strings and percussion
  - Rout (for soprano and chamber orchestra)
- Ernest Bloch – Violin Sonata No. 1
- Max Bruch - String Octet
- Ferruccio Busoni – Piano Sonatina No. 6 (Fantasia da camera super Carmen),
  - Divertimento for flute and orchestra
- Frederick Delius – Hassan
- George Enescu – String Quartet No. 1 in E-flat major, Op. 22, No. 1
- Gabriel Fauré – Masques et Bergamasques
- Johan Halvorsen – Norwegian Rhapsody No. 2
- Arthur Honegger – Pastorale d'été
  - Viola Sonata
  - Cello Sonata
- Leoš Janáček – Ballad of Blanik (symphonic poem)
- Darius Milhaud – Ballade (for piano and orchestra)
  - Le Boeuf sur le toit (ballet),
- Francis Poulenc – Five Impromptus for Piano, Suite in C Major for Piano
- Sergei Prokofiev – Five Songs without Words (for voice and piano)
- Maurice Ravel – La Valse
  - Sonata for violin and cello
- Camille Saint-Saëns - Odelette in D major Op. 162
- Erik Satie – La Belle excentrique
- Dmitri Shostakovich – Five Preludes for piano
- Igor Stravinsky – Concertino for string quartet,
  - Pulcinella
  - Symphonies of Wind Instruments
- Ralph Vaughan Williams – The Lark Ascending
  - Mass in G minor
- Heitor Villa-Lobos – Symphony No. 5, "A paz" (Peace)

== Opera ==
- Vincent D'Indy – The Legend of St. Christoper
- Clemens Freiherr von Franckenstein – Li-Tai-Pe
- Henry Hadley – Cleopatra's Night
- Leoš Janáček – The Excursions of Mr. Broucek on the Moon and in the 15th Century
- Erich Korngold – Die tote Stadt
- Ruggiero Leoncavallo – Edipo Re

== Musical theatre ==
- Afgar Broadway production opened at the Central Theatre on November 8 and ran for 168 performances
- As You Were Broadway revue by Arthur Wimperis opened at the Central Theatre on January 27 and ran for 143 performances. Starring Sam Bernard, Irene Bordoni, Clifton Webb and Hugh Cameron.
- The Beggar's Opera London production opened at the Lyric Theatre, Hammersmith on June 5 and ran for 1,463 performances
- Die Blaue Mazur (The Blue Mazurka) (Music by Franz Lehár), Vienna
- George White's Scandals Of 1920 Broadway revue opened at the Globe Theatre on June 7 and ran for 134 performances
- The Gingham Girl Broadway production (music by Albert Von Tilzer) at the Central Theatre ran for 322 performances
- Irene London production opened at the Empire Theatre on April 7 and ran for 399 performances
- Johnny Jones London production opened at the Alhambra Theatre on June 1 and ran for 349 performances
- Jumble Sale London revue opened at the Vaudeville Theatre on December 16 and ran for 176 performances
- Just Fancy London production opened at the Vaudeville Theatre on March 26 and ran for 332 performances
- Der letzte Walzer (The Last Waltz) (Music by Oscar Straus), Berlin
- A Little Dutch Girl opened at the Lyric Theatre on December 1 and ran for 207 performances
- The Night Boat Broadway production opened at the Liberty Theatre on February 2 and ran for 318 performances. Jeanette MacDonald made her first Broadway appearance as a member of the chorus.
- A Night Out London production opened at the Winter Garden Theatre on September 18 and ran for 309 performances
- Sally Broadway production opened at the New Amsterdam Theatre on December 21 and ran for 570 performances
- The Shop Girl London revival opened at the Gaiety Theatre on March 25 and ran for 327 performances
- Tickle Me ( Music: Herbert P. Stothart) Broadway production opened at the Selwyn Theatre on August 17 and ran for 207 performances. Starring Louise Allen, Allen Kearns and Frank Tinney.
- Tip Top Broadway production opened at the Globe Theatre on October 5 and ran for 241 performances
- Ziegfeld Follies of 1920 Broadway revue opened at the New Amsterdam Theatre on June 22 and ran for 123 performances, but ran most years until 1927.

== Births ==
- January 1
  - José Antonio Bottiroli, Argentine composer and poet (d. 1990)
  - Virgilio Savona, Italian singer and songwriter (Quartetto Cetra) (d. 2009)
  - Mahmoud Zoufonoun, Iranian-American violinist (d. 2013)
- January 3 – Renato Carosone, Italian musician and singer (d. 2001)
- January 5 – Arturo Benedetti Michelangeli, pianist (d. 1995)
- January 8 – Josef Josephi, Polish-born singer and actor (b. 1852)
- January 14
  - Cris Alexander, American actor, singer, dancer, designer, and photographer (d. 2012)
  - Salvador Flores Rivera, Mexican composer and singer (d. 1987)
- January 16 – Claude Abadie, French jazz clarinetist (died 2020)
- January 18 – Jan Van Halen, musician, father of Eddie and Alex Van Halen (d. 1986)
- January 24 – Hilario González, Cuban composer, pianist, musicologist, music educator, and music critic (d. 1999)
- February 2
  - Heikki Suolahti, Finnish composer (d. 1936)
  - Yuriko Amemiya, American dancer and choreographer (d. 2022)
- February 7 – Oscar Brand, Canadian-born American folk singer, songwriter and author (d. 2016)
- February 12 – Yoshiko Yamaguchi, Chinese-Japanese actress and singer (d. 2014)
- February 13
  - Boudleaux Bryant, American songwriter (d. 1987)
  - Eileen Farrell, American soprano (d. 2002)
- February 14 – Albert J. McNeil, American choral conductor, ethnomusicologist and author (d. 2022)
- February 18 – Rolande Falcinelli, organist, pianist and composer (d. 2006)
- February 23 – Hall Overton, composer, jazz pianist and music teacher (d. 1972)
- February 26 – Henri Crolla, jazz guitarist and film composer (d. 1960)
- February 28 – Albert Elms, light music composer (d. 2009)
- March 10 – Boris Vian, French writer, poet, singer and musician (d. 1959)
- March 16 – John Addison, British film composer (d. 1998)
- March 17 – John La Montaine, American composer (d. 2013)
- March 22 – Fanny Waterman, pianist and music educator (d. 2020)
- March 23 – Geoffrey Bush, British composer, writer and broadcaster (d. 1998)
- April 7 – Ravi Shankar, Indian sitarist (d. 2012)
- April 12
  - The Cox Twins, music hall entertainers (Frank, d. 2007; Fred, d. 2013)
  - Anita Ellis, Canadian-American singer and actress (d. 2015)
- April 21 – Bruno Maderna, conductor and composer (d. 1973)
- April 23 – Louis Barron, film composer (d. 1989)
- April 27 – Guido Cantelli, Italian conductor (d. 1956)
- April 29 – Harold Shapero, composer (d. 2013)
- May 2
  - Jean-Marie Auberson, violinist and conductor (d. 2004)
  - Joe "Mr Piano" Henderson, Scottish pianist and composer (d. 1980)
- May 4 – Ronald Chesney, harmonica player and comedy scriptwriter (d. 2018)
- May 13 – Gareth Morris, flautist (d. 2007)
- May 18 – Lucia Mannucci, Italian singer (Quartetto Cetra) (d. 2012)
- May 20 – Betty Driver, British singer and actress (d. 2011)
- May 21 – Bill Barber, jazz musician (d. 2007)
- May 23 – Helen O'Connell, American big band singer (d. 1993)
- May 26 – Peggy Lee, singer and songwriter (d. 2002)
- June 6
  - Dino Asciolla, violinist (d. 1994)
  - Jan Rubeš, Czech-Canadian bass opera singer, actor (d. 2009)
  - Robert Turner, composer (d. 2012)
- June 10 – Bonnie Davis, R&B singer (d. 1976)
- June 11 – Hazel Scott, jazz/classical pianist and singer (d. 1981)
- June 19 – Johnny Douglas, film composer and conductor (d. 2003)
- June 20 – Danny Cedrone, American guitarist and bandleader (d. 1954)
- June 25 – Ozan Marsh, American concert pianist (d. 1992)
- June 26 – Leonid Hambro, pianist (d. 2006)
- July 1 – Amália Rodrigues, Portuguese singer and actress (d. 1999)
- July 13
  - Anna Halprin, American dancer (d. 2021)
  - Don Ralke, American music arranger (d. 2000)
- July 14 – Marijohn Wilkin, American country and gospel songwriter (d. 2006)
- July 19 – Robert Mann, American violinist (d. 2018)
- July 20
  - Carmen Carrozza, Italian-born American accordionist (d. 2013)
  - Thanga Darlong, Indian folk musician (d. 2023)
- July 21
  - Isaac Stern, Ukrainian-born violinist (d. 2001)
  - Manuel Valls, Spanish composer (d. 1984)
- July 23 – Amália Rodrigues, Portuguese fado singer and actress (d. 1999)
- July 31 – Walter Arlen, Austrian-born American composer (d. 2023)
- August 7 – Françoise Adret, French ballet dancer, choreographer (d. 2018)
- August 8
  - Leo Chiosso, Italian lyricist (d. 2006)
  - Jimmy Witherspoon, blues singer (d. 1997)
- August 21 – John Hanson, singer and actor (d. 1998)
- August 26 – Emil Cadkin, film composer (d. 2020)
- August 29 – Charlie Parker, jazz musician (d. 1955)
- September 3 – Chabuca Granda, Peruvian singer and composer (d. 1983)
- September 7 – Al Caiola, American guitarist, composer, arranger (d. 2016)
- September 14 – Cascarita [a.k.a. Orlando Guerra], Cuban music singer (d. 1975)
- September 17 – Jean Perrin, composer (d. 1989)
- September 23
  - Alexander Arutiunian, Armenian composer (d. 2012)
  - Mickey Rooney, actor and entertainer (d. 2014)
- September 25 – Anne Triola, American actress, singer and musician (d. 2012)
- September 27 – Alan A. Freeman, English record producer (d. 1985)
- September 28 – Irma Baltuttis, singer and entertainer (d. 1958)
- October 5 – Vincent DeRosa, American musician (d. 2022)
- October 9 – Yusef Lateef, American jazz musician and composer (d. 2013)
- October 12 – Steve Conway, British singer (d. 1952)
- October 13 – Albert Hague, songwriter (d. 2001)
- October 27 – Nanette Fabray, actress and singer (d. 2018)
- October 31 – Joseph Gelineau, French composer (d. 2008)
- November 23 – Enrico De Angelis, Italian singer and entrepreneur (d. 2018)
- December 6 – Dave Brubeck, jazz pianist (d. 2012)
- December 13 – Teo Usuelli, Italian film composer (d. 2009)
- December 14 – Clark Terry, American jazz musician and composer (d. 2015)
- December 19 – Little Jimmy Dickens, American country music singer-songwriter (d. 2015)
- December 31 – Rex Allen, American actor, singer and songwriter (d. 1999)

== Deaths ==
- January 8 – Maud Powell, violinist (b. 1867; heart attack)
- January 16 – Reginald De Koven, US music critic and composer (b. 1859)
- January 18 – Giovanni Capurro, poet, co-writer of "O Sole Mio" (b. 1859)
- January 21 – John Henry Maunder, composer (b. 1858)
- January 24 – William Percy French, songwriter (b. 1854; pneumonia)
- February 2 – Theo Marzials, singer and composer (b. 1850)
- February 11 – Gaby Deslys, dancer and actress (b. 1881; Spanish flu)
- February 12 – Émile Sauret, violinist and composer (b. 1852)
- February 14 – Louis C. Elson, American music critic, writer on music, editor, journalist, composer, and professor of music theory (b. 1848)
- February 23 – Alexander Ilyinsky, music teacher and composer (b. 1859)
- March 20 – Eva Mylott, operatic contralto (b. 1875; domestic accident)
- April 4 – Carl Bohm, pianist and composer (b. 1844)
- April 8 – Charles Griffes, composer (b. 1884; Spanish flu)
- April 19 – Mathilde Mallinger, lyric soprano (b. 1847)
- May 6 – Hortense Schneider, operatic soprano (b. 1833)
- May 25 – Georg Jarno, composer of operettas (b. 1868)
- May 28 – Hardwicke Rawnsley, hymn-writer (b. 1851; heart attack)
- June 27 – Adolphe-Basile Routhier, lyricist (b. 1839)
- June 28 – Pauline Rita, singer and actress (b. c.1842; long illness)
- July 17 – Dorothy Goetz, first wife of Irving Berlin (b. 1892; typhoid)
- July 26 – Carlos Troyer, composer (b. 1837)
- August 10 – Clara Lachmann, Danish-Swedish patron of the arts (born 1864)
- August 13 – Carlos Hartling, German-born composer of the Honduras national anthem (b. 1869)
- August 29 – Gustav Jenner, composer and conductor (b. 1865)
- October 1 – Vladimir Rebikov, Russian pianist and composer (b. 1866)
- October 2 – Max Bruch, composer (b. 1838)
- October 16 – Alberto Nepomuceno, composer and conductor (b. 1864)
- October 31 – Joachim Neergaard, Danish composer (born 1858)
- November 6 – Maria Waldmann, operatic mezzo-soprano associated with Verdi (b. 1844)
- December 14 – George J. Gaskin, singer (b. 1863)
- December 31 – Paloke Kurti, Albanian composer (b. 1860)
