= Enrico Gentile =

Italian jazz and pop singer (born 1921)

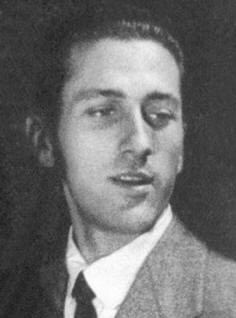

Background information
- Born: 20 January 1921; Palermo, Italy
- Genres: Jazz
- Occupation: Singer
- Instrument: Vocals
- Years active: 1940–1950

Enrico Gentile (born 20 January 1921) is an Italian retired jazz and pop singer.

== Biography ==
In 1940 he founded a vocal quartet named Quartetto Egie together with Tata Giacobetti, Iacopo Jacomelli, and Enrico De Angelis. They made their debut on 27 May 1940 at the Valle Theatre in Rome. They performed the song Bambina dall'abito blu ("little girl in a blue dress"). After a few months, De Angelis and Jacomelli left the group, which replaced them with Felice Chiusano and Virgilio Savona, and changed name to Quartetto Cetra.

In 1941 Enrico Gentile left the quartet. He was replaced by Savona's wife, Lucia Mannucci.

After the Second World War he ventured on a solo career. Between 1946 and 1950 he had twelve songs in the Italian best-selling lists, including Eulalia Torricelli, Che musetto, I pompieri di Viggiù.
