= Manlio De Angelis =

Italian voice actor (1935–2017)

- Born: 9 January 1935; Rome, Italy
- Died: 3 July 2017 (aged 82); Olbia, Italy
- Occupations: Actor; voice actor; dubbing director
- Years active: 1960–2017
- Children: Vittorio; Eleonora
- Father: Gualtiero De Angelis
- Relatives: Enrico De Angelis (brother); Massimiliano Virgilii (nephew)

Manlio De Angelis (9 January 1935 – 3 July 2017) was an Italian actor and voice actor.

== Biography ==
Manlio De Angelis was born in Rome on 9 January 1935 to historic dubber Gualtiero De Angelis. He began his career as an actor in the early 1960s. He most notably portrayed a Russian General in the 1968 film Fantabulous Inc.

De Angelis was mainly active as a voice dubber. He was best known for dubbing over the voices of Alan Arkin, Richard Dreyfuss and Joe Pesci in Italian. He also dubbed over the voice of Martin Brody (portrayed by Roy Scheider) in the Jaws film series as well as David Starsky (portrayed by Paul Michael Glaser) in Starsky & Hutch. His animation roles include voicing Friar Tuck in the Italian version of the 1973 Disney film Robin Hood as well as Yosemite Sam in the Italian version of Who Framed Roger Rabbit.

=== Personal life ===
De Angelis was the father of voice actors Vittorio and Eleonora De Angelis. His older brother Enrico De Angelis was a former member of Quartetto Cetra.

== Death ==
De Angelis died in Porto Rotondo within the province of Olbia on 3 July 2017, at the age of 82. His son Vittorio died of a heart attack two years prior.

== Filmography ==
=== Cinema ===
- Un branco di vigliacchi (1962)
- Fantabulous Inc. (1968)

=== Television ===
- I racconti di padre Brown - TV series (1971)
- L'allodola - TV play (1973)
- Qui squadra mobile - TV series (1973)
- Ritratto di donna velata - TV miniseries (1975)

== Dubbing roles ==
=== Animation ===
- Friar Tuck in Robin Hood
- Saddam Hussein in South Park: Bigger, Longer & Uncut
- Pete Belinksy in American Pop
- Lrrr in Futurama (seasons 6–7)
- Iwaki in The Orphan Brothers
- Yosemite Sam in Who Framed Roger Rabbit

=== Live action ===
- David Starsky in Starsky & Hutch
- Tommy DeVito in Goodfellas
- Nicky Santoro in Casino
- Bean in Freebie and the Bean
- Sheldon Kornpett in The In-Laws
- Elliot Garfield in The Goodbye Girl
- Dr. Leo Marvin in What About Bob?
- Martin Brody in Jaws, Jaws 2
- Joe Waters in Gone Fishin'
- Carmine in A Bronx Tale
- Louis "Lightning" Conlon in Grudge Match
- Joe Lorkowski in Sunshine Cleaning
- Edwin Hoover in Little Miss Sunshine
- Pete Sandrich in Always
- Dr. Frankenthal in Postcards from the Edge
- Sam Vigoda in Night Falls on Manhattan
- Joe Gideon in All That Jazz
- Frank Murphy in Blue Thunder
- Harry Mitchell in 52 Pick-Up
- David Ferrie in JFK
- Jimmy Alto in Jimmy Hollywood
- Leon "Bernzy" Bernstein in The Public Eye
- Muppet Studios Tour Guide in The Muppets
- Joe Volpi in Havana
- "Unca" Lou Handler in Indian Summer
- Aaron Levinsky in Nuts
- Micah Tobias in Who Is Cletis Tout?
- Douglas J. Needles in Back to the Future Part II, Back to the Future Part III
- John Talbot in Star Trek V: The Final Frontier
