= 1920 in British music =

This is a summary of 1920 in music in the United Kingdom.

== Events ==
- February – The Philharmonic Choir, under its founder Charles Kennedy Scott, appears at a Philharmonic Society concert giving the first performance of Frederick Delius's A Song of the High Hills.
- March – Adrian Boult conducts Edward Elgar's second Symphony at the Queen's Hall to "great applause" and "frantic enthusiasm",
- April – Irish composer Hamilton Harty is appointed resident conductor of the Hallé Orchestra.
- May – Noël Coward's comedy I'll Leave It to You becomes his first full-length play to be staged in London's West End.
- 4 September – City of Birmingham Orchestra holds its first rehearsals (in a police bandroom). Later in the month, it holds first concert, conducted by Appleby Matthews, including Granville Bantock's overture Saul.
- November – City of Birmingham Orchestra gives its "First Symphony Concert", with Edward Elgar conducting a programme of his own music in Birmingham Town Hall.
- 15 November – The first complete public performance of Gustav Holst's suite The Planets (including "Neptune") is given in London by the London Symphony Orchestra, conducted by Albert Coates.
- 15 December – Vaughan Williams' The Lark Ascending is premiered in its original version for violin and piano with Marie Hall as violinist at Shirehampton near Bristol.
- December – Sir Thomas Beecham is forced to disband the Beecham Opera Company because of financial difficulties.

== Popular music ==
- "Black Stitchel", w. Wilfrid Wilson Gibson, m. Ivor Gurney
- "I Belong to Glasgow", w.m. Will Fyffe

== Classical music: new works ==
- Granville Bantock – Arabian Nights
- Arnold Bax – Phantasy for viola and orchestra
- Arthur Bliss
  - The Tempest, overture and interludes;
  - Concerto for piano, tenor voice, strings and percussion
  - Rout (for soprano and chamber orchestra)
- Frederick Delius – Hassan
- Ivor Gurney – War Elegy
- Basil Harwood – Christmastide
- Dorothy Howell – Two Dances
- John Ireland – Piano Sonata
- John Blackwood McEwen – String Quartet No. 9 in B minor
- Charles Villiers Stanford – Sonata "Celtica" No. 4, Op. 153
- Ralph Vaughan Williams
  - The Lark Ascending
  - Mass in G minor
  - A London Symphony

== Musical theatre ==
- 18 September – A Night Out, with a book by George Grossmith, Jr. and Arthur Miller, music by Willie Redstone and Cole Porter and lyrics by Clifford Grey, opens at the Winter Garden Theatre in London, where it runs for 309 performances. The original cast includes Leslie Henson and Stanley Holloway.

== Births ==
- 9 January – Clive Dunn, comedy actor and chart-topping singer (died 2012)
- 23 March – Geoffrey Bush, composer, writer and broadcaster (d. 1998)
- 12 April – The Cox Twins, music hall entertainers (Frank, died 2007, and Fred, died 2013)
- 14 April – Ivor Forbes Guest, historian of dance (died 2018)
- 2 May – Joe "Mr. Piano" Henderson, Scottish pianist and composer (died 1980)
- 13 May – Gareth Morris, flautist (died 2007)
- 20 May – Betty Driver, singer and actress (died 2011)
- 19 June – Johnny Douglas, film composer and conductor (died 2003)
- 21 August – John Hanson, singer and actor (died 1998)
- 5 September – Peter Racine Fricker, composer (died 1990)
- 27 September – Alan A. Freeman, record producer (died 1985)
- 12 October – Steve Conway, singer (died 1952)
- 12 December – Dick James, singer and record producer (died 1986)

== Deaths ==
- 21 January – John Henry Maunder, composer, 61
- 24 January – Percy French, Irish-born songwriter, 65 (pneumonia)
- 7 April – Alice Elgar, wife of composer Edward Elgar, 72 (lung cancer)
- 5 May – Robert Bryan, poet and composer, 61
- 28 May - Hardwicke Rawnsley, hymn-writer, 68
- 28 June - Pauline Rita, singer and actress, about 78
- 14 December – George J. Gaskin, Irish singer, 57

== See also ==
- 1920 in the United Kingdom
