= Dyneley =

Dyneley is a surname and a given name. Notable people with the name include:

- Dyneley Hussey (1893–1972), English war poet, journalist, art critic and music critic
- John Dyneley Prince (1868–1945), American linguist, diplomat, and politician
- Peter Dyneley (1921–1977), Anglo-Canadian actor
