= Eleonora De Angelis =

Italian voice actress (b. 1967)

- Born: 23 April 1967 (age 59); Rome, Italy
- Occupations: Voice actress; dialogue adapter; dubbing director
- Years active: 1985–present
- Children: 2
- Father: Manlio De Angelis
- Relatives: Vittorio De Angelis (brother); Gualtiero De Angelis (grandfather); Enrico De Angelis (uncle); Massimiliano Virgilii (cousin)

Eleonora De Angelis (born 23 April 1967) is an Italian voice actress.

== Biography ==
Born in Rome, De Angelis is the daughter of actor Manlio De Angelis and the granddaughter of voice actor Gualtiero De Angelis. She is the official Italian voice actress of Jennifer Aniston as she gave her voice to most of her performances, most notably Rachel Green in Friends where her older brother Vittorio dubbed Matt LeBlanc as Joey Tribbiani. Growing up in a family of voice actors and dubbers, she makes frequent collaborations with her family. She also dubs over the voices of Cameron Diaz, Halle Berry, Téa Leoni, Angelina Jolie, Jennifer Garner, Sarah Michelle Gellar and Jordana Brewster.

Other dubbing roles De Angelis is known for includes Natalie Cook in the Charlie's Angels film series and Mia Toretto in the Fast and the Furious film series. In her animated roles, she voiced Wendy Testaburger in the Italian version of South Park.

De Angelis and her husband Massimiliano Torsani are the creators of Vix Vocal, an app which can identify the voice of a dubbing artist.

== Dubbing roles ==
=== Animation ===
- Wendy Testaburger in South Park, South Park: Bigger, Longer & Uncut
- Julia in Cowboy Bebop
- Dr. Sanchez in ChalkZone

=== Live action ===
- Rachel Green in Friends
- Allison in Dream for an Insomniac
- Polly Prince in Along Came Polly
- Olivia in Friends with Money
- Kate Mosley in Picture Perfect
- Justine Last in The Good Girl
- Brooke Meyers in The Break-Up
- Grace Connelly in Bruce Almighty
- Sarah Huttinger in Rumor Has It
- Jenny Grogan in Marley & Me
- Beth Murphy in He's Just Not That Into You
- Sue Claussen in Management
- Eloise in Love Happens
- Nicole Hurley in The Bounty Hunter
- Kassie Larson in The Switch
- Katherine Murphy in Just Go with It
- Dr. Julia Harris in Horrible Bosses, Horrible Bosses 2
- Sarah "Rose" O'Reilly in We're the Millers
- Claire Bennett in Cake
- Natalie Cook in Charlie's Angels, Charlie's Angels: Full Throttle
- Christina Walters in The Sweetest Thing
- Jenny Everdeane in Gangs of New York
- Maggie Feller in In Her Shoes
- Elizabeth Halsey in Bad Teacher
- Annie Hargrove in Sex Tape
- Mia Toretto in The Fast and the Furious
- Mia Toretto in Fast & Furious, Fast Five, Fast & Furious 6, Furious 7
- Kathryn Merteuil in Cruel Intentions
- Karen Davis in The Grudge, The Grudge 2
- Mikey Walsh in The Goonies
- Debbie in This Is 40
- Sharon Stone in The Flintstones
- Ro Laren in Star Trek: Picard

== Filmography ==
- Movimenti (2004)
