= Vittorio De Angelis =

Italian voice actor (1962–2015)

- Born: 20 September 1962; Rome, Italy
- Died: 11 June 2015 (aged 52); Rome, Italy
- Occupations: Voice actor; dialogue writer; dubbing director
- Years active: 1983–2015
- Father: Manlio De Angelis
- Relatives: Eleonora De Angelis (sister); Gualtiero De Angelis (grandfather); Enrico De Angelis (uncle); Massimiliano Virgilii (cousin)

Vittorio De Angelis (20 September 1962 – 11 June 2015) was an Italian voice actor.

== Biography ==
Born in Rome, De Angelis was the son of voice actor Manlio De Angelis and the grandson of voice actor Gualtiero De Angelis. He began his voice acting career at 21 years of age and one of his first major roles was dubbing the voice of Prince Eric in the Italian dub of The Little Mermaid and I.M. Weasel in the Italian dub of I Am Weasel. He was also best known for voicing Joey Tribbiani (portrayed by Matt LeBlanc) in the Italian-Language dubbed version of Friends and the spin-off Joey as well as voicing Geordi La Forge (portrayed by LeVar Burton) in the Italian-Language dubbed version of Star Trek: The Next Generation.

De Angelis was the occasional voice actor of Cary Elwes, Kevin James and Matt LeBlanc. Some of the actors he dubbed in their most famous films included Billy Crudup in Big Fish, Val Kilmer in Tombstone and Stephen Dorff in Blade. He also dubbed Steve Zahn, Scott Speedman, Brendan Fraser and Ethan Hawke in some of their films.

== Death ==
De Angelis died of a heart attack in Rome on June 11, 2015, at the age of 52. He was survived by his father Manlio as well as his younger sister Eleonora (who is also a voice actress).

== Dubbing roles ==
=== Animation ===
- Prince Eric in The Little Mermaid, The Little Mermaid II: Return to the Sea
- I.M. Weasel in I Am Weasel
- Alan in A Troll in Central Park
- News Reporter in South Park: Bigger, Longer & Uncut
- Atlas in Metropolis
- Elzar, Roberto and various characters in Futurama
- Frederic Downing in Resident Evil: Degeneration
- Marnie's father in When Marnie Was There
- Captain Lincoln F. Sternn in Heavy Metal
- Legato Bluesummers in Trigun
- Chas Finster in Rugrats in Paris: The Movie
- Matt Bluestone in Gargoyles
- Jim Porter in Tarzan

=== Live action ===
- Joey Tribbiani in Friends, Joey
- Geordi La Forge in Star Trek: The Next Generation, Star Trek Generations, Star Trek: First Contact, Star Trek: Insurrection, Star Trek: Nemesis
- Robin Hood in Robin Hood: Men in Tights
- Arthur Holmwood in Bram Stoker's Dracula
- Nick Ruskin in Kiss the Girls
- John Houseman in Cradle Will Rock
- Lawrence Gordon in Saw
- Lawrence Gordon in Saw 3D
- Arnold in Georgia Rule
- Jack Reigert in Edison
- Paul Blart in Paul Blart: Mall Cop, Paul Blart: Mall Cop 2
- Eric Lamonsoff in Grown Ups, Grown Ups 2
- Griffin Keyes in Zookeeper
- Will Cooper in Pixels
- Jason Gibbons in Charlie's Angels, Charlie's Angels: Full Throttle
- Don West in Lost in Space
- Clayton Boone in Gods and Monsters
- George in George of the Jungle
- Sam Mastrewski in Twenty Bucks
- Bill / Hugh Winterbourne in Mrs. Winterbourne
- Pleasure in The Air I Breathe
- John Crowley in Extraordinary Measures
- Will Bloom in Big Fish
- Doc Holliday in Tombstone
- Deacon Frost in Blade
- Anthony Corleone in The Godfather Part III
- Hans Kooiman in Race the Sun
- Marvin in Daddy Day Care
- George Pappas in You've Got Mail
- Wayne Wayne Wayne Jr. / David in Happy, Texas
- Wayne Lefessier in Saving Silverman
- Ray Hasek in Riding in Cars with Boys
- Russell Gettis in Bad Teacher
- Jay Hargrove in Sex Tape
- Vernon T. Waldrip in O Brother, Where Art Thou?
- Percy in Little Man
- Michael Drucker in The 6th Day
- Brutus Howell in The Green Mile
- Agent Dunn in 2 Fast 2 Furious
- Terry Hoitz in The Other Guys
- Bill Tanner in Skyfall
- Mike Reilly in FeardotCom
- Dick Shadow in Bucky Larson: Born to Be a Star
- Bill in Click
- Tiano in Dragon Eyes
- Tom Myers in American Pie, American Pie 2
- Steven Kovacs' Brother in The Cable Guy
- Bruce Baxter in King Kong
- Chuck Mitchell Jr. in Are We Done Yet?
- Fred Haise in Apollo 13
- Jack Belston in Indian Summer
- Sonny in I, Robot
- Tommy Gunn in Rocky V
- Match in Back to the Future Part II
- John Brooke in Little Women
- Ray Levoi in Thunderheart
- William MacPherson in Conspiracy
- Virgil Kirkhill in Hardwired
- Wyatt Earp in Wyatt Earp's Revenge
