= A Fugal Concerto =

Orchestral concerto

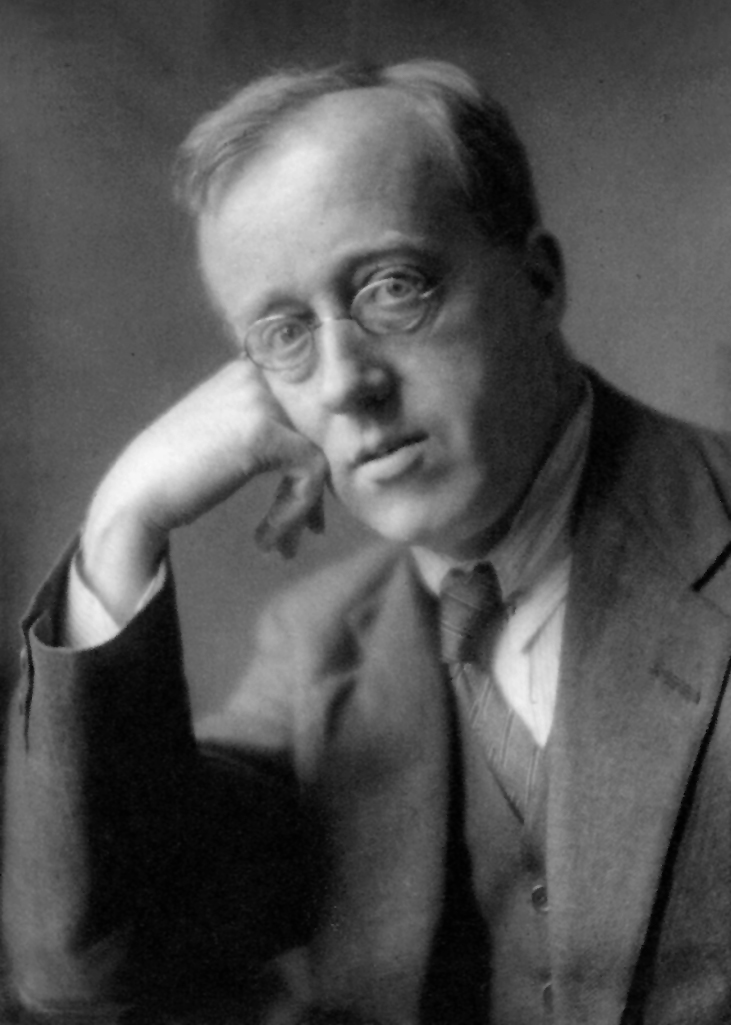
Gustav Holst ca. 1921

A Fugal Concerto (Op. 40, no. 2; H 152) by the English composer Gustav Holst is a short concerto in three movements for flute, oboe and string orchestra. It was composed and first performed in 1923. Influenced by the counterpoint of J. S. Bach, it is an early example of neoclassicism. Early reviews of the concerto were mixed, but it has since come to be seen as an attractive, if slight, example of Holst's neoclassical style, and it has been recorded many times.

== Composition ==
The Fugal Concerto was composed while Holst was convalescing from a serious fall in which he had struck his head, and from a subsequent nervous breakdown. Having previously committed himself to conduct his own works at the University of Michigan, he embarked for America on the RMS Aquitania in April 1923, two months after the accident, and began a draft of what he called "The World's Shortest Concerto" (it is about 8 minutes long) during the voyage. He completed the work in the university library at Ann Arbor. Holst scored it for flute and oboe (or two violins) and string orchestra; he also published a version with the orchestral part reduced for piano. An arrangement for flute, oboe and wind ensemble has since been published by Geoffrey Brand.

== Early performances ==
The Fugal Concerto was first performed privately on 17 May 1923 at the house of Marion LeRoy Burton, president of the University of Michigan, in Ann Arbor; flautist Alfred Quensel and oboeist Alfred Barthel performed with members of the Chicago Symphony Orchestra under Frederick Stock. The first US public performance took place on 30 March 1924 at Aeolian Hall, New York, with Georges Barrère, Pierre Matthieu, the New York Philharmonic and Walter Damrosch. The UK premiere and global first public performance was at one of Henry Wood's Queen's Hall Promenade Concerts on 11 October 1923, the composer conducting the New Queen's Hall Orchestra with Robert Murchie and Léon Goossens. There were later Proms performances on 2 September 1925, 22 August 1929, and 11 August 1971.

== Structure and style ==
It is in three short movements, marked moderato, adagio, and allegro. The first movement treats its fugal subject in a thoroughly Baroque style; the flowing, melancholy melody of the second sometimes calls to mind the slow movement of the Brandenburg Concerto No. 1; and in the third the fugal subject is turned into a double fugue by the introduction of a traditional melody, "If all the world were paper". The concerto as a whole works more like a chamber piece than an orchestral one. It continues an exploration of problems in counterpoint which Holst had begun the previous year. Like its predecessor A Fugal Overture (1922), the Fugal Concerto harks back to the sound world of Bach, achieving a variety of neoclassicism which probably owes nothing to similar and contemporaneous European works by Stravinsky and others.

== Reception ==
The Times's review of the first UK performance described it as being "in the spirit of the Brandenburg Concertos of Bach. Indeed, Mr Holst has here come nearer to formal perfection than in any of his previous works, without abandoning his individual point of view." A critic in The Musical Times who heard it in 1924 thought it "almost too witty. It is delicious." However, one composer called it "desiccated", and many other early critical judgements were sparing of praise or outright hostile. A second critique in The Times in 1924 conceded that it "is fun, of course, but rather heavy fun; the penalty of jokes is that they ill bear repetition"; and a third in 1935 wrote of its "ingenious triviality". The critic Dyneley Hussey thought the Fugal Concerto and the Fugal Overture "perverse exercises in the contrapuntal style, devoid of any warmth and with none of the real vitality which appears in the earlier 'St Paul's' Suite for strings." American reviews could also be lukewarm or cool. Olin Downes wrote that it was "smoothly written, and if a certain middle-of-the-road and eminently respectable manner is really typical of English music, then it is evident that this music is English." Musical America believed that it "scarcely explain[s] the great renown [Holst] enjoys". A 1967 recording of the work was similarly dismissed as "little more than an academic study"; it was "much less taking [than the Lyric Movement] with none of [its] character or inspiration".

Holst's biographers saw more in the work. His daughter Imogen Holst judged that "the punctilious formality...is gracious compared with the calculated violence of the Fugal Overture," and Clement Short thought it "light and elegant, with typically individual touches such as the displacement of rhythmic motifs and unexpected harmonizations." Later 20th century and 21st century CD reviewers wrote of it with enthusiasm: "a complete success", "appealing...cool interplay of wind colour", "a beautifully crafted triptych of miniatures", "delightful...a nice example of early neo-classicism, which does not sound in the least pedagogic", "a light but craftsmanly piece...The cheeky end is a sure pointer to the composer's sense of humour. Interesting to note that on first reception the work was received as rather dry...yet viewed from today it appears anything but."

== Recordings ==
=== Version for flute, oboe and string orchestra ===
- William Bennett (flute), Peter Graeme (oboe), English Chamber Orchestra, cond. Imogen Holst (1967). Gustav Holst: Lyric Movement, Brook Green Suite, Nocturne, A Fugal Concerto, St. Paul's Suite (LP). Lyrita. SRCS 34.
- Alexa Still (flute), Stephen Popperwell (oboe), New Zealand Chamber Orchestra, cond. Nicholas Braithwaite (1991). Holst: Brook Green Suite, Lyric Movement, A Fugal Concerto, St. Paul's Suite, Morris Dances (CD). Koch International Classics. 3-7058-2 H1.
- Julia Bogorad (flute), Kathryn Greenbank (oboe), Saint Paul Chamber Orchestra, cond. Christopher Hogwood (1994). Tippet: Fantasia Concertante on a Theme of Corelli; Holst: St Paul's Suite, A Fugal Concerto; Corelli: Concerto Grosso, Trio Sonata; Bach/Hogwood: Fugue in B Minor (CD). London. 440 376-2.
- Duke Dobing (flute), Christopher Hooker (oboe), City of London Sinfonia, cond. Richard Hickox (1994). St Paul's Suite, Brook Green Suite, Double Concerto, A Fugal Concerto, Lyric Movement, Two Songs Without Words (CD). Chandos. CHAN 9270.
- Jonathan Snowden (flute), David Theodore (oboe), English Chamber Orchestra, cond. Yehudi Menuhin (1994). Gustav Holst: St Paul's Suite, Brooke Green Suite, A Fugal Concerto, A Somerset Rhapsody (CD). EMI Eminence. CD-EMX 2227.
- Edward Beckett (flute), Malcolm Messiter (oboe), London Festival Orchestra, cond. Rose Pople (1996). Gustav Holst: Orchestral Music (CD). Arte Nova Classics. 74321 34022 2.
- János Balint (flute), Lajos Lencses (oboe), Budapest Strings, cond. Karoly Botvay (2002). Music for Strings (CD). Capriccio. C10584.
- Kate Hill (flute), Ruth Bolister (oboe), Elgar Chamber Orchestra, cond. Stephen Bell (2004). English Oboe Concertos (CD). ASV. CDDCA1173.
- Anna Pyne (flute), Philip Harmer (oboe), English Sinfonia, cond. Howard Griffiths (2007). Holst: Double Concerto, St Paul's Suite, Brooke Green Suite (CD). Naxos. 8.570339.

=== Version for flute, oboe and piano ===
- Amy Porter (flute), Nancy Ambrose King (oboe), Phillip Bush (piano) (2003). Holst, Damase, Delibes, Ginastera, Bozza, Holst (CD). Boston. BR1055CD.

=== Arrangement for wind ensemble ===
- European Winds, cond. Geoffrey Brand (1994). Hammersmith (CD). Albany. TROY 120.
