= Iacopo Jacomelli =

Italian singer

Iacopo Jacomelli (born 12 July 1921) is an Italian singer mostly active in the 1940s and the 1950s. He was born in Bordeaux, France.

In 1940, he founded a vocal quartet named Quartetto Egie together with Tata Giacobetti, Enrico Gentile and Enrico De Angelis. They made their debut on 27 May 1940, at the Valle Theatre in Rome. They performed the song Bambina dall'abito blu ("little girl in a blue dress").

After a few months, he left the group, which replaced him with Virgilio Savona and changed the name to Quartetto Ritmo.
