= A Fugal Overture =

Musical composition by Gustav Holst

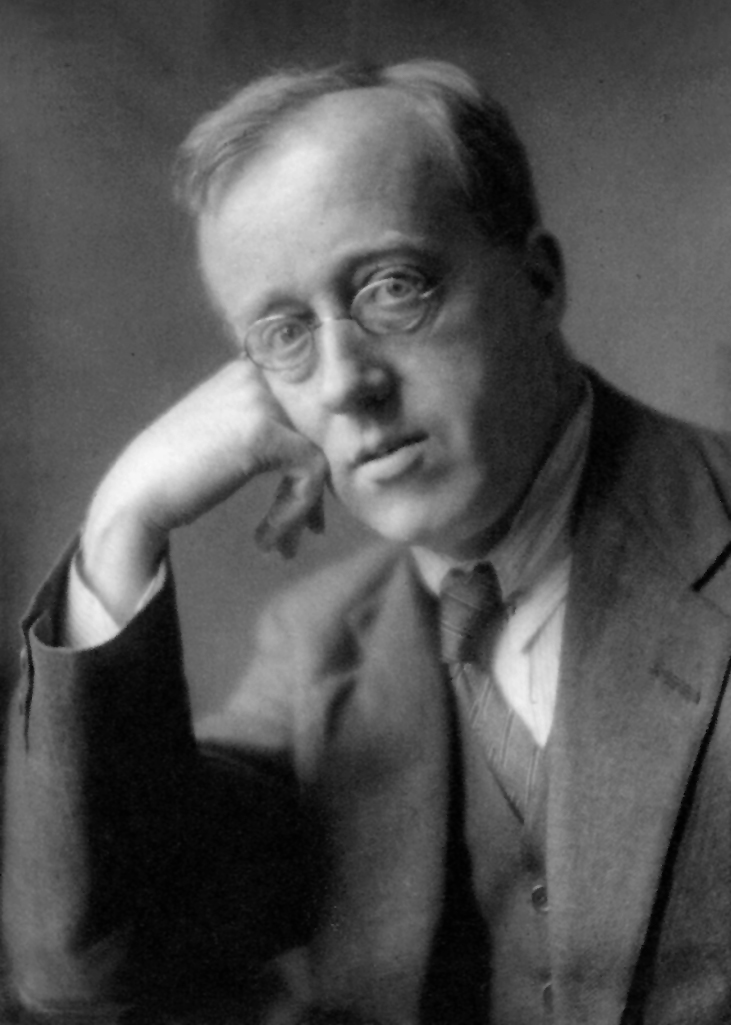
Gustav Holst ca. 1921

A Fugal Overture, Op. 40/1, H 151, is a short (approximately 5 minutes) concert overture for full orchestra by the English composer Gustav Holst. It was written in 1922 and first performed in 1923, and is a very early example of musical neoclassicism. Though there were conflicting opinions from Holst's contemporaries about the work's merits, it has since come to be considered an attractive and exciting, if slight, example of Holst's later style.

== Scoring ==
The Fugal Overture is scored for piccolo, two flutes, two oboes, cor anglais, two clarinets in B♭, bass clarinet, two bassoons, double bassoon, four horns in F, three trumpets in C, three trombones, tuba, timpani, percussion (one or two players), and strings. There is an arrangement for piccolo, flute, oboe, cor anglais, two clarinets, two bassoons, two horns, two trumpets, two trombones, and strings; also a two-piano reduction.

== Composition and early performances ==
Holst began to write the Fugal Overture in the summer of 1922, composing for the most part in a soundproof room at St Paul's Girls' School, where he worked as a music teacher. He initially intended it to develop into a ballet. The full score was completed on 4 January 1923.

The overture was first performed on 14 May 1923 at the Royal Opera House, Covent Garden, by Eugène Goossens conducting the British National Opera Company Orchestra. It served to introduce Holst's opera The Perfect Fool, also being premiered on that occasion. The first concert performance was at one of Henry Wood's Queen's Hall Promenade Concerts on 11 October 1923, the composer conducting the New Queen's Hall Orchestra; it featured in the Proms again in 1949 and 1985. The BBC broadcast the work for the first time early in 1924, and in 1927 the Czech Philharmonic Orchestra conducted by Václav Talich performed it in Prague.

Holst planned to record the work for the Columbia Gramophone Company, but this project came to nothing. The first recording of it was made by Sir Adrian Boult and the London Philharmonic Orchestra in 1967, issued by Lyrita the following year.

== Style and structure ==
Though called fugal by Holst and said by him to be a sonata, the overture is a somewhat unconventional example of both forms. It was inspired by the counterpoint of J. S. Bach, and can be compared with the neoclassical works of Stravinsky, though, slightly antedating them, it can owe them no debt.

The Fugal Overture is divided into three sections. The first has a precipitate fugal subject in 4/4 time with strong cross-rhythms, the eight quavers falling into a 3 + 3 + 2 pattern. The second section is much slower, and includes a cello solo reminiscent of the sound world of Holst's later Egdon Heath. The third section returns to the fugal subject of the first.

== Reception ==
The Fugal Overture met with a mixed reception in the 1920s and 1930s. The Musical Times found it "splendidly amusing", The Times enjoyed its "lively rhythms and vivid colour", but on another occasion compared it unfavourably to the Fugal Concerto, saying it had "less ideas in it...and such as it has have been better expressed by the composer before". R. W. S. Mendl called it "an exhilarating piece of fun from beginning to end", but Dyneley Hussey complained that both the Overture and Holst's almost contemporaneous Fugal Concerto were "[p]erverse exercises in the contrapuntal style, devoid of any warmth and...real vitality".

Later unfavourable judgements came from normally friendly critics. Holst's daughter Imogen considered it "unsatisfactory", finding only in the central section a "merciful deliverance" from the "noise" of the fugue, which assaulted the ear; and Ralph Vaughan Williams, discussing Holst's music, admitted that it was "not one of [his] favourite works". But there was also much praise. The Times, reviewing a 1956 performance by Boult, thought he made a cogent case for it as "an invigorating work that could effectively start any symphony concert". William Mann in 1967 thought it "exhilarating". In 1974 Hugh Ottaway, in The Musical Times, wrote that though it was not a major achievement it was a lively piece, "well worth hearing from time to time in place of some of the more hackneyed 'starters'." In more recent years it has been called "bracingly exuberant", and "a thrilling little piece...which feels like a 1920s equivalent of Short Ride in a Fast Machine."

== Recordings ==
- London Philharmonic Orchestra, cond. Sir Adrian Boult (1968). Holst: A Fugal Overture; Moeran: Sinfonietta; Bax: November Woods (LP). Lyrita. SRCS 37.
- London Festival Orchestra, cond. Ross Pople (1992). Holst: The Planets, St Paul's Suite, A Fugal Overture (CD). ASV. DCA 782.
- London Symphony Orchestra, cond. Richard Hickox (1996). Holst: Orchestral Works (CD). Chandos. CHAN 9420.
- Royal Scottish National Orchestra, cond. David Lloyd-Jones (1998). Holst: Beni Mora, Somerset Rhapsody, Hammersmith, Egdon Heath, Invocation for Cello and Orchestra (CD). Naxos. 8.553696.
