= Flute Sonata (Poulenc) =

1957 sonata for flute and piano by Francis Poulenc

The Sonate pour flûte et piano (Flute Sonata), FP 164, by Francis Poulenc, is a three-movement work for flute and piano, written in 1957.

The sonata was commissioned by the American Library of Congress and is dedicated to the memory of Elizabeth Sprague Coolidge, an American patron of chamber music. Poulenc preferred composing for woodwinds above strings. He premiered the piece with the flautist Jean-Pierre Rampal in June 1957 at the Strasbourg Music Festival. The work was an immediate success, and was quickly taken up in the US, Britain and elsewhere and has been recorded many times. Critics have noted Poulenc's characteristic "trademark bittersweet grace, wit, irony and sentiment" in the piece. In 1976, thirteen years after Poulenc's death, the composer Lennox Berkeley made a well-regarded orchestrated version of the work that has also been recorded.

The flute sonata became one of Poulenc's best-known works and is a prominent feature in 20th-century flute repertoire. It has a claim to be the most played of any work for flute and piano.

== Background and first performance ==
Poulenc began to think of writing a flute sonata in 1952, but he was occupied with his Sonata for Two Pianos and then his opera, Dialogues des Carmélites. In April 1956, when he was still working on the opera, he was approached by Harold Spivacke of the American Library of Congress with a request to write a piece for two pianos or alternatively a chamber piece for up to six instruments. Poulenc was too busy to accept, but Spivacke persisted. Poulenc told him, "Much more at home with wind instruments than strings, I admit I am tempted by this combination", as he had always preferred winds – with their similarities to the human voice – to stringed instruments. (Note: Poulenc wrote: "nothing could be further from human breath than the stroke of a bow". He thought little of his own sonatas for cello and for violin.) In August he agreed to go ahead. The sonata was commissioned in memory of a musical benefactor, Elizabeth Sprague Coolidge, to whom Poulenc dedicated the work.

Poulenc spent the winter of 1956–57 in Cannes, where he composed the sonata between December and March. When he had completed the first two of the three movements, he wrote to his friend Pierre Bernac:

In working on this Flute Sonata I have the feeling of going back a long way, but with a more settled technique. It's a sonata of Debussyan dimensions. It's the French sense of balance [la mesure française]. Finding the form for your language is the most difficult thing. It's what Webern has in the highest degree … and what Boulez has not yet found.

On 18 June 1957, the public premiere was given at the Strasbourg Music Festival by the flautist Jean-Pierre Rampal, for whom it had been written, with the composer at the piano. (Note: Rampal and Poulenc had given gave the work a private performance the previous day to an audience of one: the pianist Arthur Rubinstein, who could not be present at the official premiere.) Le Figaro said of the work, "The music burst forth from the heart, without formality, and 'sang', in every sense". Another critic stated that the sonata was "the best of Poulenc, and even a little better".

== Music ==
The sonata is in three movements, taking a total of 12 minutes in performance. The score was published in France and Britain shortly after the premiere. In 1994 a new edition by Carl B. Schmidt and Patricia Harper was issued, correcting discrepancies and errors in the earlier published score. The musicologist Malcolm MacDonald writes of the sonata:

The work is infused with Poulenc’s trademark bittersweet grace, wit, irony and sentiment, which are manifested in different ways in each of its three movements. The first … makes clear the composer’s elegiac intentions; the second is a haunting cantilena for the flute. Very fast and very tricky for the players, the skittish and vivacious … finale brings the work to a close in cheerful and sardonic style.

=== I. Allegro malinconico ===
The movement starts in 2/4 (♩ = 82) with an opening four-bar phrase with a descending theme, beginning with a broken triad of demisemiquavers around high E and declining to the G above middle C. The piano's right-hand part interweaves arpeggiated semiquavers over a pedal in the left hand. This is followed by an upward scale by both flute and piano leading to a contrasting theme, also descending. MacDonald comments that the opening "makes clear the composer’s elegiac intentions", and other analysts write of the "poignancy" of the principal theme, despite the seemingly vivacious tempo. A counter-theme in F major gives the flute upwardly-leaping arpeggios, before the opening theme returns in A minor. Wilfrid Mellers comments that the reappearance of the first theme in an unexpected key makes it clear that Poulenc is not following sonata form but is using "a subtle ternary structure". After a slightly faster middle section there is a recapitulation of a kind with, in Mellers's words, "enharmonic ambiguities that justify the 'malinconico' of the directive", and:

Fragments of the first section's airborne melody intermingle with ecstatic spurtings of the middle theme. A coda to the coda is explicitly based on blue false relations between major and minor thirds.

The flute part is technically demanding in this movement, with frequent trills and demisemiquaver tonguing.

=== II. Cantilena: Assez lent ===
This movement (♩ = 52) is much slower and quieter. In its song-like tune Poulenc acknowledged there were echoes of Sister Constance in Dialogues des Carmélites but the effect here is purely lyrical – an "infinite melody" (mélodie infinie) – with none of the drama of the opera. The movement begins with two quavers on the piano, which are echoed by the flute during the course of the next two bars. The smooth scalic lines of the opening section are succeeded by contrasting vigorous dotted rhythmic material in the middle section with the flute going up to a top B, before the tranquil opening theme returns to bring the movement to a close.

Asked about the term "cantilena", Poulenc replied that it "is not a fixed form like passacaglia for example, it is a free form … I could have called it an interlude ("intermède") or a romance".

=== III. Presto giocoso ===
This movement (♩ = 160–168) is predominantly extrovert and fast; the beat is a strongly marked 2/4. The shape is roughly that of a rondo with choruses and verses, but Poulenc treats the form freely. In Mellers's phrase, "The flute flickers, the piano bounces, in a helter skelter gallop". The fast music culminates in a long trill on high G, followed by a brief silence from which there comes, unexpectedly, a quotation from the dotted rhythm "mélancolique" theme of the first movement's middle section, in its original key of F sharp minor. The music gathers speed again and the sonata sprints to a double fortissimo finish, "strictement en mesure sans ralentir" ("strictly in time without any slowing down").

The finale is sometimes compared to the exuberant finales of Poulenc's early chamber works, particularly the Trio (1926), but the Poulenc scholar Claude Caré finds more in common between this movement and the Concert champêtre (1927–28). The composer is reported to have said that the movement should be played as quickly as possible because "it isn't any good" (he probably would have liked more time to work on it) but others have found it "masterly" and "a perfect conclusion".

== Later concert performances and recordings ==
Poulenc considered giving the American premiere together with Rampal during a planned US tour, but the tour did not take place and Rampal gave the American premiere in February 1958 with his regular accompanist Robert Veyron-Lacroix. Poulenc was pleased to accompany other flautists in the sonata. In January 1959 he accompanied Gareth Morris in the British premiere, in an all-Poulenc programme that included the world premiere of his Élégie in memory of Dennis Brain for horn and piano. Later in that year Poulenc played the piano part with Maxence Larrieu in Avignon, Rampal in Paris and Christian Lardé in Menton. in 2015, the pianist and scholar David Owen Norris called the sonata "probably the world's most played piece for flute and piano".

=== Recordings ===
The American premiere was recorded, as was the composer's Paris performance with Rampal. There have been many subsequent recordings of the sonata. Among the earlier ones are those by Michel Debost with Jacques Fevrier and Rampal with Veyron-Lacroix. Later recordings include those by Julius Baker with Lisa Logan and Mathieu Dufour with Éric Le Sage. Among recordings singled out in a BBC Radio 3 survey in 2015 are those by William Bennett with Clifford Benson; Sharon Bezaly with Ronald Brautigam; Patrick Gallois with Pascal Rogé; Emmanuel Pahud with Le Sage; Ileana Ruhemann with Kathron Sturrock; and Adam Walker with James Baillieu.

== Orchestral version ==
In 1976 the flautist James Galway asked the English composer Sir Lennox Berkeley, a good friend of Poulenc's for many years, to orchestrate the sonata. While working on it, Berkeley wrote in his diary:

The task of orchestrating Poulenc's Flute Sonata ... proves as difficult as I had feared. ... The difficulty is the entirely pianistic nature of the accompaniment, extremely difficult to translate into orchestral terms. ... Another difficulty is that Francis, though there are things I love in his music, has passages that are strangely clumsy and that I long to rewrite, but of course I can't add or subtract anything and I should only spoil the whole thing … I have to think all the time of how he would have wanted it to sound.

The musicologist Roger Covell wrote of Berkeley's orchestration, "It is hard to imagine the job being done better … this sonata-concerto has Poulenc's characteristic and attractive mixture of flippancy and tenderness". The Musical Times commented in 1978 that "the orchestration does complete justice to the composer. [It] adds a worthwhile new dimension to the music: the long-drawn sad melodic lines played by the flute, especially in the first two movements, are complemented in a way not possible on the piano".

The orchestral arrangement has been recorded by Galway with the Royal Philharmonic Orchestra and Charles Dutoit, and later by Emily Beynon with the BBC National Orchestra of Wales and Bramwell Tovey, Jennifer Stinton with the Scottish Chamber Orchestra and Steuart Bedford, and Bezaly with the Residentie Orkest Den Haag and Neeme Järvi.

== Notes, references and sources ==
=== Sources ===
- Berkeley, Lennox (2012). Peter Dickinson (ed.). Lennox Berkeley and Friends Writings, Letters and Interviews. Woodbridge: Boydell. ISBN 978-1-84383-785-5.
- Caré, Claude (2013). "La Musique de chambre de Francis Poulenc" (PDF). Francis Poulenc (in French). Association des amis de Francis Poulenc. Archived from the original (PDF) on 7 April 2020.
- Mellers, Wilfrid (1995). Francis Poulenc. Oxford and New York: Oxford University Press. ISBN 978-0-19-816338-1.
- Nichols, Roger (2020). Poulenc. New Haven: Yale University Press. ISBN 978-0-300-22650-8.
- Poulenc, Francis (1958). Sonata for Flute and Piano. London: J. and W. Chester. OCLC 650201304.
- Rifkin, Deborah (2006). "Making it Modern: Chromaticism and Phrase Structure in Twentieth-Century Tonal Music". Theory and Practice. 31: 133–158. JSTOR 41054376. (subscription required)
- Schmidt, Carl B (2001). Entrancing Muse: A Documented Biography of Francis Poulenc. Hillsdale, US: Pendragon Press. ISBN 978-1-57647-026-8.
- Schmidt, Carl B (2002). The Music of Francis Poulenc (1899–1963): A Catalogue. Oxford: Clarendon Press. ISBN 978-0-19-816336-7.
