= Alfred John Ellory =

British musician

Alfred John Ellory (18 June 1920, Cornwall – 5 July 2009) was a British musician best known for playing flute on several of the James Bond films in the 1960s.

Ellory won a scholarship to the Royal College of Music as a teenager, where he studied with Robert Murchie.

A member of the Philharmonia Orchestra, Ellory provided music for EMI Records, including backing for the original Ealing comedies.

From the 1950s, Ellory turned freelance and provided music for radio and television series, including The Avengers and, later, The Professionals. He also played on the famous Pink Panther soundtracks by Henry Mancini. Other film work he played on included soundtracks for The Guns of Navarone and Where Eagles Dare, as well as for the Beatles on their song The Fool on the Hill.

Ellory was a keen exponent of alto and bass flute, instruments. Ellory played on some of the Bond films' scores during their heyday with Sean Connery in the 1960s.
