= Gualtiero De Angelis =

Italian voice actor (1899–1980)

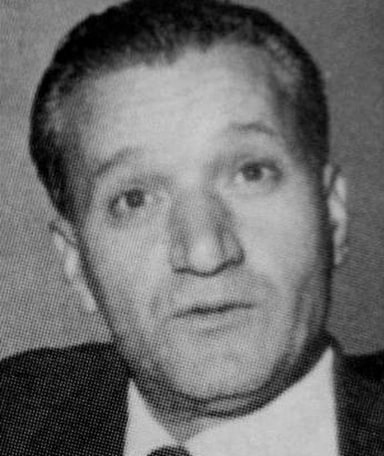
- Born: 22 November 1899; Rome, Italy
- Died: 6 June 1980 (aged 80); Rome, Italy
- Occupations: Actor; voice actor
- Years active: 1936–1980
- Children: 3, including Manlio and Enrico
- Relatives: Vittorio De Angelis (grandson); Eleonora De Angelis (granddaughter); Massimiliano Virgilii (grandson)

Gualtiero De Angelis (22 November 1899 – 6 June 1980) was an Italian actor and voice actor. He was best known for dubbing James Stewart in the Italian language releases of nearly all of his films.

== Biography ==
Born in Rome, De Angelis began his career in 1936. During that time, he starred in over nine films and dubbed over the voices of many famous actors. He was the official Italian voice of James Stewart as well as Cary Grant, Dean Martin and Errol Flynn. He also dubbed over the voices of John Garfield, George Raft, Richard Conte, Kirk Douglas, Paul Henreid, Henry Fonda, Gary Merrill, John Wayne, Arthur Kennedy, William Holden and many more. He has also dubbed over Italian actors such as Vittorio Gassman, Luciano Tajoli and Pietro Germi.

De Angelis was considered to be among the most influential voice dubbers employed with the Cooperativa Doppiatori Cinematografici along with Emilio Cigoli, Lydia Simoneschi, Lauro Gazzolo, Carlo Romano, Giulio Panicali, Stefano Sibaldi, Bruno Persa and more.

=== Personal life ===
De Angelis was the patriarch of the historic De Angelis family which are well known for dubbing voices. He was the father of voice actor Manlio De Angelis (1935–2017), singer Enrico De Angelis (1920–2018) and Paola De Angelis. He also had three grandchildren: Vittorio De Angelis (1962–2015; via Manlio), Eleonora De Angelis (born 1967; via Manlio) and Massimiliano Virgilii (born 1967; via Paola) who are all voice actors.

== Death ==
De Angelis died on June 6, 1980, in Rome at the age of 80. He was later laid to rest at the Cimitero Flaminio.

== Filmography ==
=== Cinema ===
- Arditi civili (1940)
- Piccolo re (1940)
- Vento di milioni (1940)
- Big Shoes (1940)
- The Secret of Villa Paradiso (1940)
- Beatrice Cenci (1941)
- Love Story (1942)
- Vortice (1953)
- La grande avventura (1954)

== Dubbing roles ==
=== Live action ===
- Ransom Stoddard in The Man Who Shot Liberty Valence
- Buttons the Clown in The Greatest Show on Earth
- John Michael "Chip" Hardesty in The FBI Story
- Howard Kemp in The Naked Spur
- Shepherd Henderson in Bell, Book and Candle
- Ben McKenna in The Man Who Knew Too Much
- Will Lockhart in The Man from Laramie
- Mace Bishop in Bandolero!
- Theodore Honey in No Highway in the Sky
- Bill Smith in Come Live with Me
- George Bailey in It's a Wonderful Life
- Frank Towns in The Flight of the Phoenix
- Lin McAdam in Winchester '73
- Grant McLaine in Night Passage
- Charles Lindbergh in The Spirit of St. Louis
- Steve Martin in Thunder Bay
- Martin Breitner in The Mortal Storm
- Marshal Guthrie McCabe in Two Rode Together
- P.J. McNeal in Call Northside 777
- Rip Smith in Magic Town
- Marvin Payne in You Gotta Stay Happy
- Robert Leaf in Dear Brigitte
- Linus Rawlings in How the West Was Won
- Bill Lawrence in The Jackpot
- Gaylord Esterbrook in No Time for Comedy
- Rupert Cadell in Rope
- Charlie Anderson in Shenandoah
- John O'Hanlan in The Cheyenne Social Club
- Tom Jeffords in Broken Arrow
- Paul North Sr. in The Last Gangster
- John Royer in Malaya
- Guy Johnson in It's a Wonderful World
- John Horace Mason in Made for Each Other
- Monty Stratton in The Stratton Story
- Paul Biegler in Anatomy of a Murder
- Philip Stevens in Airport '77
- E.W. Hostetler in The Shootist
- Glenn Miller in The Glenn Miller Story
- L.B. "Jeff" Jefferies in Rear Window
- John "Scottie" Ferguson in Vertigo
- Jeff Webster in The Far Country
- Tom Destry in Destry Rides Again
- Slim in On Our Merry Way
- Glyn McLyntock in Bend of the River
- Roger Hobbs in Mr. Hobbs Takes a Vacation
- Matt Appleyard in Fools' Parade
