= Fantabulous Inc. =

1967 film

- Film poster
- Directed by: Sergio Spina
- Screenplay by: Furio Colmbo; Ottavio Jemma; Sergio Spina
- Starring: Richard Harrison
- Cinematography: Claudio Ragona
- Edited by: Giancarlo Cappelli
- Music by: Sandro Brugnolini
- Production companies: Summa Cinematografica; Procinex
- Release date: 1968 (Italy)
- Running time: 95 minutes
- Countries: Italy; France

Fantabulous Inc. (Italian: La Donna, il sesso e il superuomo) is a 1968 Italian-French superhero crime film directed by Sergio Spina and starring Richard Harrison.

== Cast ==
- Richard Harrison as Richard
- Judi West as Deborah
- Adolfo Celi as Von Beethoven
- Gustavo D'Arpe as Professor Krohne
- Fabienne Fabre as Alice
- Nino Fuscagni as Leonard MacFitzroy aka Zio Mac
- Silvio Bagolini
- Gislaine Barbot
- Enzo Fiermonte
- Aldo Bonamano
- Anita Cortinovis
- Manlio De Angelis as Russian General
- Arturo Dominici
- Giacomo Furia
- Virgilio Gazzolo

== Production ==
Fantabulous Inc. was Sergio Spina's directorial debut. His next film was his second and last film L'asino 'doro.

== Release ==
On the film's release, distributors changed the original Italian title Fantasbulous and replaced it with the title La donna, il sesso e il superuomo (lit. Woman, Sex and the Superman). The film was released in Italy in 1968.

== Reception ==
In a contemporary review in Variety, Mosk. proclaimed that the creators of the film "may have imagined they were making a satirical, progressive pic. But it exploits sex, political notations, and comic strip origins without humor, insight or point to make this just a flaccid programmer that might be used in action or grind spots abroad on its unregenerate bad taste."
