= Robert Murchie =

British flautist (1884-1949)

- Born: Robert Murchie; 2 March 1884; Greenock, Scotland
- Died: 26 July 1949 (aged 65) Paddington, London
- Genre: Classical
- Occupations: Musician, professor
- Instrument: Flute

Robert Murchie, photo courtesy of Robert Bigio

Robert Murchie (2 March 1884 – 26 July 1949) was a virtuoso British flautist and a prominent member of the major English orchestras between 1914 and 1938. He was successively principal flautist in the New Symphony, Beecham Symphony, Queen's Hall, New Queen's Hall, London Symphony, Royal Philharmonic Society, BBC Symphony and London Philharmonic Orchestras. In 1926 he founded a chamber ensemble of leading wind players known as the London Wind Quintet. He was described by Sir Henry Wood as "one of the finest of living flautists" who said he had "a tone, a technique and a musicianly style that cannot be surpassed". In her book 'The Flute Book', by Nancy Toff, she describes Murchie thus: The English style of flute playing reached its apogee in the playing of Robert Murchie, perhaps the premier London flautist between the two world wars.

== Early life ==
Murchie was born on 2 March 1884 in Greenock, Renfrewshire, Scotland to Robert Arnot Murchie and Isobel Gray Rankin. His father was a painter decorator. Robert was one of six children, all of who could play a musical instrument. Robert's father bought him a piccolo when he was seven years old and a flute when he was nine. At aged nine, he was performing for ships' officers in Scotland and by sixteen he had played in the Scottish Orchestra under Richard Strauss.

== Early career ==
The 1901 Scotland census states that aged 17 Robert was a theatre musician in his native Scotland. In 1906 he was awarded a free open scholarship to study with William Lewis Barrett at the Royal College of Music, London. The minutes books of the Executive and Finance Committee of the RCM from 19 July 1906 state that Murchie was helped to purchase the quality of instrument he needed for his studies, by allowing its £24 cost to be deducted in instalments from his maintenance grant. In 1907 he received his first Musical Times notice from a Bach Cantata concert at the Royal College of Music, where as a student he performed under Sir Charles Villiers Stanford.

In 1909 Murchie was playing with the New Symphony Orchestra as their piccolo player, as can be seen in their orchestra lists of the period.

He married Florence Barrow, a fine singer, also a student at the RCM, in 1910 and they had two children, Robert Arnot Murchie and James Ian Murchie. James, who was himself a fine flautist, his father's pupil, was an RAF Pilot who died aged 19 in 1941 when his Vickers Wellington was shot down over Germany during a night raid on Berlin.

Early in his career, Robert was a member of the Royal Victory Band, an ensemble that recorded for the British Victory label ca. 1912. In September 1913, Murchie was chosen to play alongside the great Italian coloratura soprano, Luisa Tetrazzini, in a recording of Caterina's grand aria from Meyerbeer's L'étoile du nord. He joined the London Symphony Orchestra in 1914 and remained with the orchestra until 1920. Whilst a flautist with the London Symphony Orchestra, he saw active service during the first World War, enlisting in 1916 and served, attaining the rank of Sergeant, in the 45th Battalion, Canadian Expeditionary Force. He became the Brigade bandmaster in 1917 and played the Fourth Army over the Rhine.

== Leading London flautist ==
He became one of the leading flute players in London, succeeding Albert Fransella as principal flute of the orchestra of the Royal Philharmonic Society (1925–1932). He was also the first principal flute of the newly formed BBC Symphony Orchestra (1930-1938). Murchie was arguably the leading orchestral flautist in London during the inter-war years, a fact that allowed him to negotiate a salary of £1,000 p.a. in 1930, far higher than the standard principals' salary of £800. He was also at various times principal flute of the London Symphony Orchestra, the New Queen's Hall Orchestra and the Henry Wood Symphony Orchestra. Murchie also played with the BBC's Wireless Military Band, conducted by Lieut. B. Walton O'Donnell of the Royal Marines, which was founded in 1927 and disbanded in 1943. The Military Band had great success both at home and overseas.

He was principal of the variously named Proms orchestras from 1919 until 1928, when he left for a period of two years. He returned in 1931 and continued as principal until retiring after his last Prom, in which he played Bach's Concerto No. 8 in A minor for Flute, Violin, and Piano, on 22 September 1937, when he took up professorships at Trinity College of Music and the Royal College of Music.

== Chamber music career ==
He was an active chamber music player. In late 1919, Murchie played at the memorial concert in Balliol Hall for Frederick Septimus Kelly, playing Kelly's Flute Serenade with Sir Donald Tovey on piano. Also performing at that concert was Jelly d’Aranyi with whom Murchie performed on numerous occasions.

In 1922 Murchie was one of six instrumentalists along with Haydn Draper (Clarinet), F.Moss (Saxophone), Herbert Barr (Trumpet), Charles Bender (Percussion) and Ambrose Gauntlett (cello), who gave the first private performance of William Walton's Facade, an Entertainment. Edith Sitwell was the reciter, on sengerphone, and the performance took place at the Sitwell family home at Carlyle Square, London. The first public performance of the work took place in June 1923 at the Aeolian Hall, London. William Walton was the conductor on both occasions. The first complete broadcast of Façade was given on 3 March 1930 at one of the BBC Concerts of Contemporary Music in Central Hall, Westminster. The instrumentalists on that occasion were: Robert Murchie (Flute) Frederick Thurston (Clarinet), Walter Lear (Saxophone), Ernest Hall (Trumpet), Charles Bender (Percussion) and Ambrose Gauntlett (cello). The reciter was Constant Lambert and the conductor was Leslie Heward.

Murchie recorded Maurice Ravel's Introduction and Allegro, with Ravel conducting, in 1923. In October 1923 he gave the first public performance of Gustav Holst's Fugal Concerto for Flute, Oboe and Strings with the renowned oboist Léon Goossens and Holst conducting.

He was a founder member of the London Wind Quintet in 1926 and was one of the London Flute Quartet with fellow Proms performers Gordon Walker, Frank Almgill and Charles Stainer. The London Wind Quintette - with Robert Murchie (flute), Haydn Draper (Clarinet), Léon Goossens (oboe), Frederick Wood (bassoon) and Aubrey Brain (horn) were contracted to record a series of chamber works for Edison Bell. In May 1926 they recorded Janacek's Mladi Suite for Wind Sextet with the composer in the studio (Mendelssohn Draper playing the bass clarinet part). On 9 October 1927 Bela Bartok joined the group to perform Mozart's Quintet for piano and wind for an early BBC radio broadcast. Murchie also played in the Spike Hughes 10-piece orchestra alongside Eugene Cruft, James Lockyer (viola), Haydn Draper, Léon Goossens, Sidonie Goossens and Edward Chapman, a fine horn player. This 10-piece orchestra accompanied many of Decca's solo artistes including Gertrude Lawrence.

In the early 1930s, Murchie played with the Philharmonic Trio, having replaced Albert Fransella as the flutist. The ensemble consisted of Robert Murchie, Leon Goossens (Oboe) and Francesco Ticciati (Pianoforte).

== Renowned exponent of J.S. Bach ==
He was a renowned exponent of Johann Sebastian Bach and played in the New Queen's Hall Orchestra and the Henry Wood Symphony Orchestra, under the baton of Henry Wood, numerous times. He played alongside the celebrated Dame Myra Hess in the popularisation of Bach's 5th Brandenburg Concerto. A Promenade Concert review in The Musical Times of 1924, when Murchie played alongside Hess and Charles Woodhouse, the celebrated violinist, describes his playing thus: ‘Than Mr. Murchie’s flute playing I know nothing more satisfying to the lover of artistic shading and rhythmic subtlety.’ Throughout the 1920s and 30s, the period in which the Brandenburg Concertos and Orchestral Suites dominated the programming of orchestral Bach, Murchie was one of the most visible orchestral performers associated with the composer. Of the thirteen solo Prom performances given by Murchie in 1927–8, ten were of Bach.

== Later years ==
His last professional review was in May 1938 when he performed Bach's 2nd Brandenburg Concerto under Arturo Toscanini. From 1946 to 1948 he was flute professor at Kneller Hall. He was also the flute professor at Eton College, Windsor; Winchester College (where amongst his pupils was Randall Swingler) and St. Paul's Girls' School, London.

Robert Murchie died in Paddington, London on 26 July 1949 at the age of 65 after a short illness. He was a very successful teacher; his students included Gareth Morris, (to whom he bequeathed his Rudall Carte flute), Richard Adeney, Alfred John Ellory, John Francis, Arliss Marriott, Edgar Hunt, Harold Clarke, Leonard Hopkinson, Muriel Dawn, John Braddock and Alexander Douglas Murray. Several flute works were composed for him including Charles Stainer's Étude in D minor.

== Recordings ==
=== HMV recordings ===
- Meyerbeer, La, la, la, - Grand’ aria di Caterina, from "Stella del Nord", Luisa Tetrazzini, Soprano, with Orch. Flutes: Robert Murchie and Gilbert Barton. HMV VB 15. Recorded 26 Sep. 1913. Luisa Tetrazzini, The Complete known recordings. Pearl GEMM CDs 9220.
- Ravel, Introduction & Allegro - Robert Murchie Fl, Charles Draper Cl, John Cockerill Hp, Marjorie Hayward Vln, Edwin Virgo Vln, Raymond Jeremy Vla, Cedric Sharpe Vc, HMV C1662/3 (Cc15828/30) Year: 1929

=== Columbia recordings ===
- Ravel, Introduction & Allegro - Robert Murchie Fl, Haydn Draper Cl, Gwendolen Mason Hp, Charles Woodhouse Vln, Herbert Kinsey Vln, Ernest Tomlinson Vla, Ivor James Vc, Ravel (cond.) Columbia L1518/9 (AX171/4) Year: 1923
- J.S. Bach, Suite In B Minor, For Flute & Strings - Robert Murchie, Sir Hamilton Harty, The Symphony Orchestra - (Shellac, 12", 80RPM) Columbia L1557 & 1558 Recorded 20 Jan 1924, released June 1924.
- J.S. Bach, Jesu Joy Of Man's Desiring / Rondeau And Badinerie, Choir And Orchestra Of The Bach Cantata Club, London - Robert Murchie With Strings Of The Bach Cantata Club, London (Shellac, 10") Columbia D.B. 507 Year: 1932
- Briccialdi, The Carnival of Venice with variations. Columbia 3222 (73093)
- Donjon J., Little Nightingale (Rossignolet). Columbia 3222 (73092)
- Mozart, O dolce contento - Robert Murchie, Haydn Draper & pf Columbia 3240 (73203) Year: 01/02/1923
- Pfyffer, Serenade Op.4 - Robert Murchie, Haydn Draper & pf Columbia 3288 (73206)
- Saint-Saens, Tarantelle - Robert Murchie, Haydn Draper & pf Columbia 3288 (73205)
- Wilcocke, Valse de Concert - Robert Murchie, Haydn Draper & pf Columbia 3240 (73204)
- The London Flute Quartet: Robert Murchie, Gordon Walker, Frank Almgill, Charles Stainer. Salomon Jadassohn : Scherzo, Op.57 / Rimsky-Korsakov : ‘Flight of the Bumble-Bee’/ Grieg : Lyric Pieces, Op 12 No. 4 ‘Dance of the Elves’ (arr. by William Alwyn) / Chopin : Prelude in A major Op.28 No.7 / Grieg : Lyric Pieces, Op 12 No. 6 ‘Norse’ (arr. by William Alwyn) Columbia 4215 (Recorded Oct.1926, released 1927)
- The London Flute Quartet: Robert Murchie, Gordon Walker, Frank Almgill, Charles Stainer. Briccialdi : ‘Il Carnival di Venezia’ op. 77 (arr. by Charles Stainer); Traditional : "Scotch and Irish Airs" (arr. by Charles Stainer) Columbia 4155

=== Edison Bell recordings ===
- Bizet, Carmen - Robert Murchie, Leon Goossens, Haydn Draper, Wilfred James, A.E.Brain - L.W.Q. Edison Bell 517 (X1149D)
- Haydn, Presto - Robert Murchie, Leon Goossens, Haydn Draper, Wilfred James, A.E.Brain - L.W.Q. Edison Bell 1093 (8226A)
- Gounod, Kermesse - Robert Murchie, Leon Goossens, Haydn Draper, Wilfred James, A.E.Brain - L.W.Q. Edison Bell 519 (X1150D)
- Onslow, Scherzo - Robert Murchie, Leon Goossens, Haydn Draper, Wilfred James, A.E.Brain - L.W.Q. Edison Bell 1093 (8225A)
- Pierné, Pastorale - Robert Murchie, Leon Goossens, Haydn Draper, Wilfred James, A.E.Brain - L.W.Q. Edison Bell 515 (X1147G)
- Scarlatti, Andante & Allegro - Robert Murchie, Leon Goossens, Haydn Draper, Wilfred James, A.E.Brain - L.W.Q. Edison Bell 515 (X1148L)
- Thuille, Sextet mvt.1 - Robert Murchie, Leon Goossens, Haydn Draper, Wilfred James, A.E.Brain, C.Woodhouse Edison Bell 612 (X1228B)
- Thuille, Sextet mvt.2 - Robert Murchie, Leon Goossens, Haydn Draper, Wilfred James, A.E.Brain, C.Woodhouse Edison Bell 612 (X1229G)
- Thuille, Sextet mvt.3 - Robert Murchie, Leon Goossens, Haydn Draper, Wilfred James, A.E.Brain, C.Woodhouse Edison Bell 613 (X1230A)
- Thuille, Sextet mvt.4 - Robert Murchie, Leon Goossens, Haydn Draper, Wilfred James, A.E.Brain, C.Woodhouse Edison Bell 613 (X1231A)

=== Other ===
- Lefebvre, Finale to Suite - Robert Murchie, Leon Goossens, Haydn Draper, Wilfred James, A.E.Brain - L.W.Q. Winner 3476 (06671A)
- Warlock, The Curlew (Song cycle after W.B. Yeats) - John Armstrong (baritone), Robert Murchie (flute), Terence McDonagh (cor anglais), International String Quartet (Andre Mangeot Vln, Walter Price Vln, Eric Bray Vla, Jack Shinebourne Vlc) conducted by Constant Lambert (National Gramophonic Society 163–165). Recorded March 1931. This recording was made with the personnel who gave the Warlock Memorial performance on 23 February 1931 at the Wigmore Hall. This recording is also available on the Symposium Label, 1203, and Pearl Gem0058.
- Paddy's Reel / Sailor's Hornpipe, Trad., Robert Murchie (piccolo). APEX - 441, 1921. Also on Gennett Label - 4660.
- La Merle Blanc; Emerald, polka mazurka. Robert Murchie (piccolo). Dacapo label - 350
- The Deep Blue Sea; Scherzo Brillante. Robert Murchie (piccolo). Dacapo label - 447
