= Felice Chiusano =

Italian singer

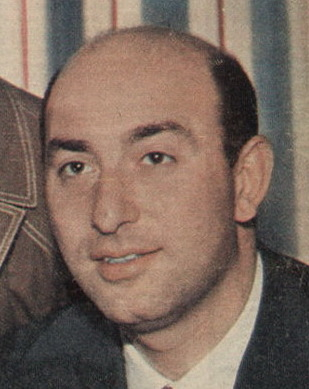

Felice Chiusano (28 March 1922 – 3 February 1990) was one of the singers of Quartetto Cetra, a popular Italian vocal quartet.

== Biography ==
Chiusano was born in Fondi, in the province of Latina, a region in Lazio.

Uncle-in-law of the anchorman Ettore Andenna.

He was a self-taught guitarist. Later on, he learned to play the drums. He left his native village before his twentieth birthday and moved to Rome. After work, he performed in local clubs as a singer and guitarist.

He successfully auditioned for EIAR, the Italian national radio broadcasting company, and worked as a singer for radio orchestras.

In 1941, he replaced Enrico Gentile in the line-up of Quartetto Ritmo, a vocal quartet soon to be renamed Quartetto Cetra.

Felice Chiusano was known as the "bald head" of Quartetto Cetra. He was famous for his sense of humour and jokes.

During the 1970s and 1980s, as Quartetto Cetra gradually scaled back their public appearances, he also worked in the organization of shows and cultural events.

Chiusano died in Milan in 1990.
