= Hilario González =

Hilario González (January 24, 1920, Havana – October 3, 1999, Havana) was a Cuban composer, musicologist, pianist, music educator, and film and performing arts critic.

== Biography ==
He was a musicologist at the National Museum of Music in Havana from its founding in 1971 until his death in 1999. He was considered an authority on the composers Esteban Salas y Castro, Alejandro García Caturla, and Amadeo Roldán; all of whom he published scholarly works on. His compositions include the ballet Antes del Alba (1945); the piano works Dos danzas afrocubanas (1938), Tres preludios en conga (1938), Paqueña suite (1941), and Sonata in A (1942), ; multiple song cycles; choral works; orchestral pieces, such as Concertino in D (1944) and Concerto in E♭ for piano and orchestra (1946); chamber music; and art songs
