= Palokë Kurti =

Albanian musician

Palokë Kurti (1858–1920) was an Albanian composer, performer, and singer. A native of Shkodër, he was a musical amateur who composed the Unity of Albania March (Bashkimi Shqipnis) in 1881.

== Biography ==
Kurti took his first piano lessons from the Italian musician Giovanni Canale. During his youth he was in contact with the aheng groups from which he learned their way of singing and also how to compose verses in the bejtexhi style. He joined the Shkodra band in 1878 and two years later became its bandmaster. After the Bashkimi Shqipnis March he also composed several marches, polkas and mazurkas in the Mittel-Europa tradition. However the compositions related to national music are the ones that will make him important in the history of the music of Albania.

Kurti composed two potpourris on Shkodrane urban popular songs called "The Musical Entertainment of our Forefathers", the second of which is in F Major. In this potpourri he uses an entirely diatonic modal language and a tonal harmony (unlike in Potpourri 1 which uses non-diatonic modes of the makam type). According to Koço he is doing this on purpose so that the local music was purged of Oriental sounds, but sounded more Western.

Kurti composed songs and also wrote the texts of the songs. Several songs that have been composed by Kurti have survived but many survive without attribution.

He was exiled for two years, probably for political reasons. After his return to Shkodër in the 1890s his main occupation was composing. He was exiled two more times, the last time to Corfu in 1919. Exhausted, he died in 1920 and his burial was followed by a multitude of people from his native town.

He is noted for blending oriental and Western musical influences.

== Bibliography ==
- Koço, Eno (2004). Albanian urban lyric song in the 1930s, Volumes 1–2. The Scarecrow Press. pp. 83–84. ISBN 0-8108-4890-2.
