= I Belong to Glasgow =

Song by Will Fyffe

"I Belong to Glasgow" is a song written and recorded by the music hall entertainer Will Fyffe in 1920. It has been performed by Danny Kaye, Eartha Kitt, Gracie Fields and Kirk Douglas.

According to Albert Mackie's The Scotch Comedians (1973), Fyffe got the inspiration for the song from a drunk he met at Glasgow Central Station. The drunk was "genial and demonstrative" and "laying off about Karl Marx and John Barleycorn with equal enthusiasm". Fyffe asked him "Do you belong to Glasgow?", and the man replied "At the moment, at the moment, Glasgow belongs to me."

If your money, you spend,
You’ve nothing to lend,
Isn’t that all the better for you.

The song speaks of drink in a period where temperance campaigns were prevalent, and it shows a typical music hall attitude to the supposedly tyrannical wife. The monologue accompanying the song is the origin of several popular humorous catch phrases, including "under the affluence of incohol". The entertainer Harry Lauder was offered the song, but declined because it praised strong drink.

As a result of this song, Will Fyffe became forever associated with Glasgow, but he was born 70 miles (110 km) away in the east coast city of Dundee.

The song was used in the 1955 film The Colditz Story, but the lyric was modified to "I Belong to Colditz".
