= Virgilio Savona =

Italian composer (1919–2009)

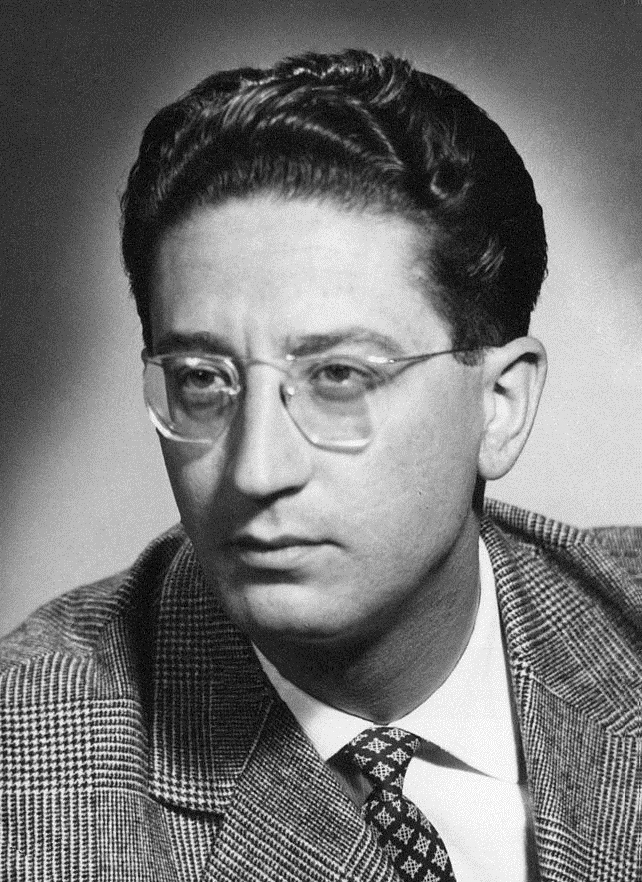
- Savona in the 1950s

Background information
- Birth name: Antonio Virgilio Savona
- Born: 21 December 1919; Palermo, Italy
- Died: 27 August 2009 (aged 89); Milan, Italy
- Occupation(s): Composer, arranger, and singer with Quartetto Cetra
- Spouse: Lucia Mannucci (m. 1944)

Antonio Virgilio Savona (21 December 1919 – 27 August 2009) was an Italian composer, arranger, and singer in the Italian vocal group, the Quartetto Cetra.

== Biography ==
Savona was born in Palermo, Italy. His artistic career started very early. In 1926, aged six, he began studying music. Two years later, he joined a choir and at the age of 10, he debuted in a radio broadcast playing a piece on a piano during a children's program.

After high-school, Savona enrolled at the Accademia Nazionale di Santa Cecilia in Rome to study piano.

In 1941, he replaced Iacopo Jacomelli in a vocal quartet called Quartetto Egie. The group changed name to Quartetto Ritmo at first, then to Quartetto Cetra one year later.

On 19 August 1944, Savona married the singer Lucia Mannucci, who later joined Quartetto Cetra to replace Enrico De Angelis, who left the group in 1947.

Besides singing, Savona composed and arranged for the group. He wrote the music while Tata Giacobetti, another member of the quartet, wrote the lyrics. They collaborated for four decades and produced hundreds of songs which made up Quartetto Cetra's vast repertoire.

Savona composed music and wrote scripts for radio and TV programs, stage shows and films. During the 1970s, he was active as pianist, orchestra conductor, arranger and producer. He extensively researched on folk songs. In 1971, he wrote Angela, a song for Angela Davis, Black American communist leader, innocent in prison at this time. In the 1970s, he also published other controversial songs, such as "Il testamento del parroco Meslier" ("The Testament of Parson Meslier"), a violent attack on power and religion, based on the Testament of the priest and illuminist atheist philosopher Jean Meslier.

In 1991, he wrote a popup book about Quartetto Cetra, published by Sperling & Kupfer in the Supersound collection.

In 2009, Savona died in Milan from complications of Parkinson's disease.
