= John Hanson (singer) =

Canadian-born English tenor singer and actor (1922–1998)

John Stanley Hanson (born John Stanley Watts; 21 August 1920 – 3 December 1998) was a Canadian-born English tenor and actor, who starred in several West End musicals during the 1960s and 1970s.

He was born in Oshawa, Ontario, Canada, of English parents, who moved back across the Atlantic three years later. He was educated at Dumfries Academy in Dumfries, Scotland. His headmaster recognised his talent as a boy soprano, and recommended him to the BBC in Scotland. It was there that he made his debut, at the age of 12.

His 1960 album, The Student Prince / The Vagabond King peaked at Number 9 in the UK Albums Chart. Hanson was most famous for his role as the "Red Shadow", the hero of the musical The Desert Song, which enjoyed a record-breaking revival at the Palace Theatre in 1967.

He also appeared in the 1973 Christmas Special of the BBC's Morecambe and Wise Show in which he sang "Stout-Hearted Men". He also appeared on BBC TV's long running variety show The Good Old Days.

Hanson died in December 1998, at the age of 78, in Shepperton, Surrey, England.
