= Gareth Morris =

British flautist

- Born: Gareth Charles Walter Morris; 13 May 1920; Clevedon, Somerset, England
- Origin: London, England
- Died: 14 February 2007 (aged 86)
- Genre: Classical
- Instrument: Flute
- Years active: 1939–1971

Gareth Charles Walter Morris (13 May 1920 – 14 February 2007) was a British flautist. He was the principal flautist of a number of London orchestras, including the Boyd Neel Orchestra, before joining the Philharmonia Orchestra. He was the principal flautist of this orchestra for 24 years and Professor of the Flute at the Royal Academy of Music from 1945 to 1985. Morris was known for using a wooden flute, at a time when most other players had switched to using metal flutes.

Gareth Morris was born in Clevedon, Somerset, England, and was educated at Bristol Cathedral Choir School. He began to play the flute when he was aged 12, and subsequently studied privately with Robert Murchie. At 18 he won a scholarship to the Royal Academy of Music, where his main teacher was Charles Stainer. At the academy he met Dennis Brain and they became lifelong friends. Morris was best man for Brain's wedding. Morris's Wigmore Hall debut was in 1939 and he played in chamber music groups, including the Dennis Brain Wind Ensemble and the London Wind Quintet. During the Second World War he joined the Royal Air Force and was principal flute in the RAF Symphony Orchestra.

Morris succeeded Arthur Gleghorn as principal flute in the Philharmonia Orchestra in 1948. He played at Queen Elizabeth II's coronation in 1953. The Philharmonia Orchestra had been founded by Walter Legge in 1945 but in 1964 Legge announced that he intended to disband it. However the members dissented from this and agreed that the orchestra should continue, that it should be self-governing, and that it should be renamed the New Philharmonia Orchestra. In 1966 Morris became chairman of this orchestra with Otto Klemperer as the principal conductor. Morris had a close and deeply respectful relationship with Klemperer, but his relationship with Karajan has been described as "at best cordial, but he respected the conductor's talent".

Klemperer retired in 1971 when he was aged 87, and was succeeded by Lorin Maazel followed by Riccardo Muti. Morris retired shortly afterwards from the orchestra. The press release at the time spoke of "irreconcilable artistic differences" which had contributed to his resignation. However, there was another, possibly more important, factor. While on tour with the orchestra in New York City, Morris was mugged and seriously injured. Amongst the injuries, a nerve in his mouth was damaged and as a result, he had to completely give up playing the flute.

Morris's flute was originally a Rudall-Carte with open G-sharp and vented D, and later in his career he performed on an instrument bequeathed to him by Robert Murchie. His style was of the English school, with a tight embouchure and he produced a very solid and powerful tone which was also capable of incredible delicacy. He eschewed the use of excessive vibrato. He was said to be "at the forefront of English flute playing for more than half a century". Many composers wrote works for him, including Gordon Jacob and Alan Rawsthorne. During his career he gave the first British performance of Poulenc's Flute Sonata in 1958.

Morris married first, in 1954, Joy Hazelrigg of Kentucky, and they had a daughter, Emily. Following a divorce, in 1975 he married Patricia Murray, with whom he had three children, Thomas, Mary and Catharine.

Morris retired to Bristol and there continued to teach. In 1991 he published a tutorial entitled Flute Technique. His other activities included being an adjudicator, an orchestral coach and a lecturer. He frequently taught at the Dartington Summer School. His siblings are Christopher, a music publisher at the Oxford University Press, and Jan Morris, the travel writer. A photographic portrait taken in 1968 by Godfrey Argent is held by the National Portrait Gallery.
