= Quartetto Cetra =

Italian band

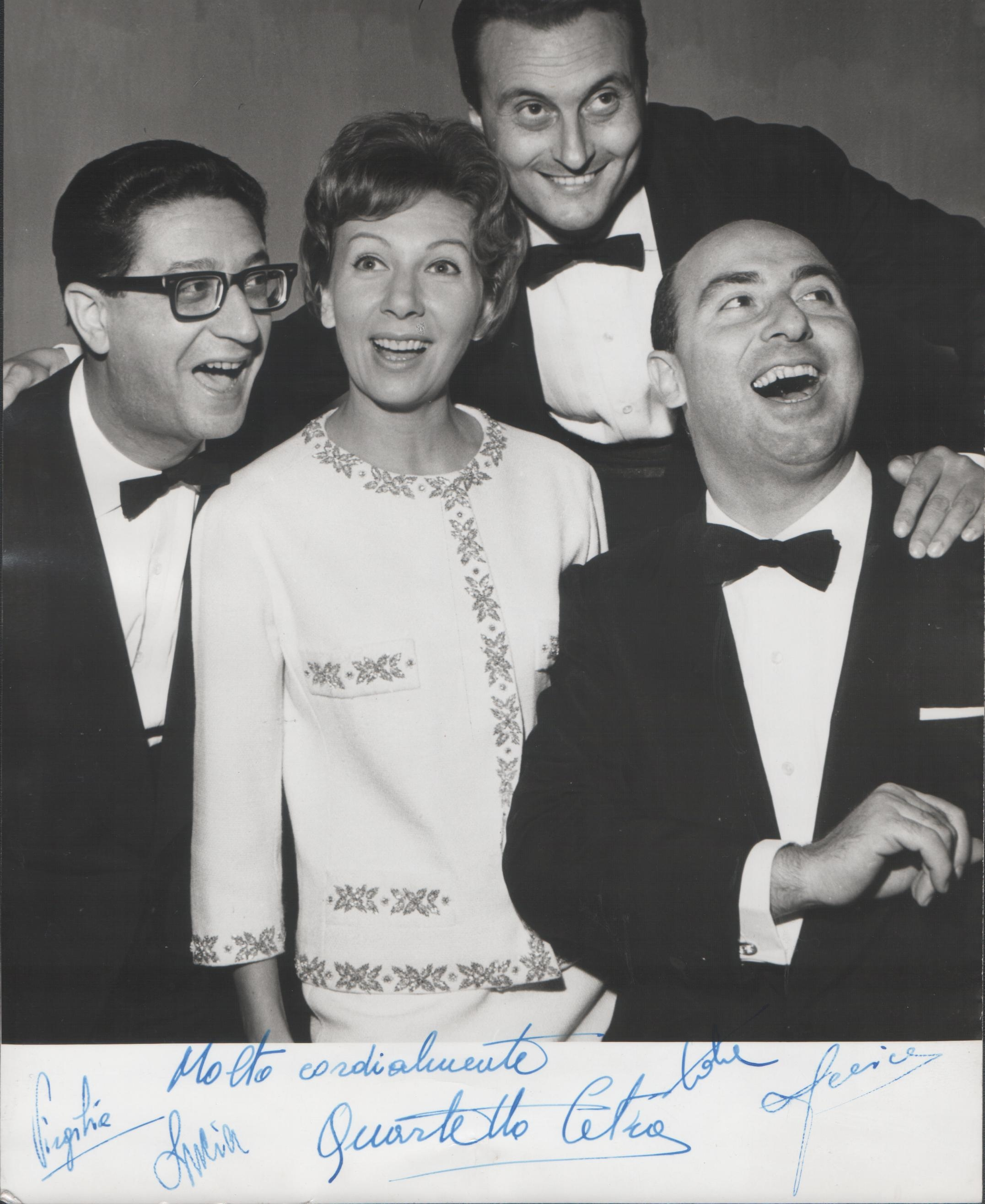
Quartetto Cetra in Belgrade c. 1950 from left to right: Virgilio Savona, Lucia Mannucci, Tata Giacobetti, Felice Chiusano

Quartetto Cetra (Italian for 'Cittern Quartet', pronounced [kwarˈtetto ˈtʃeːtra]) was an Italian jazz vocal quartet established during the early 1940s and active until 1988.

== Career ==
The band was based on the Mills Brothers and started performing under the name Quartetto Egie from the initials of the singers' first names: Enrico Gentile, Giovanni Giacobetti, Iacopo Jacomelli, and Enrico De Angelis. Although they sang American songs such as "Tiger Rag", they wrote songs and scatted in Italian. Quartetto Egie made its debut on 27 May 1940 at the Valle Theatre in Rome. They performed the song "Bambina dall'abito blu" ("Little Girl in a Blue Dress"). When Virgilio Savona replaced Iacopo Jacomelli, the band was renamed Quartetto Ritmo. Then in 1941, Felice Chiusano replaced Enrico Gentile and the group was renamed Quartetto Cetra and performed on the radio review Riepilogando in 1941.

In October 1947, Enrico De Angelis left the group to join the Army and was replaced by singer Lucia Mannucci, the wife of Virgilio Savona. This group lasted for four decades. The first song they performed together was "Dove siete stata nella notte del 3 giugno?" ("Where were you on the night of June 3?"). In 1948 Quartetto Cetra dubbed the choruses for the Italian release of the Disney movie Dumbo. They received a complimentary note signed by Walt Disney. Afterwards they dubbed other movies in Italian, such as Make Mine Music, Melody Time, and The Wizard of Oz.

Quartetto Cetra made their stage debut in Pietro Garinei and Sandro Giovannini's Gran Baldoria review in 1951 at Teatro Nuovo in Milan. This was the first of several musical comedies the group would be involved with. On stage, the Cetras worked with other Italian celebrities such Wanda Osiris and Alberto Sordi. During the 1950s the drummer Rodolfo Bonetto made many recordings with the group. He later became one of Italy's leading post-war industrial designers.

When Italian television started broadcasting in 1954, Quartetto Cetra made its first domestic television appearance on In quattro si viaggia meglio ("You travel better when you're four"). They had appeared on British television in 1948 in Café Continental. With time the group worked on other TV programmes, including parodies of novels such as The Count of Monte Cristo and The Three Musketeers.

The quartet's early style resembled the Mills Brothers' with jazz and swing vocal arrangements. They collaborated with Franco Cerri and Gorni Kramer. The group then performed catchy tunes with funny lyrics and sophisticated arrangements that were performed in comedy acts. Commercial success encouraged Quartetto Cetra to perform on radio, stage, and television. The band's repertoire included more than a thousand songs. Most were written by Giacobetti and Savona. These include "Il Visconte di Castelfombrone", "In un palco della Scala", "Un disco dei Platters","'Nella vecchia fattoria" (Italian version of Old MacDonald Had a Farm), "Vecchia America", "Che centrattacco" (dedicated to footballer Virgilio Levratto), "Un bacio a mezzanotte" and "I ricordi della sera". Their song "Crapa Pelada (Testa Pelata)" ("Bald Head") was used on the American television series Breaking Bad in the final episode of the third season. Quartetto Cetra performed for the last time on 1 July 1988, in Bologna, Italy.

== Members ==
- Felice Chiusano (†1990) – vocals, drums (1941–1988)
- Tata Giacobetti (†1988) – vocals, double bass (1941–1988)
- Lucia Mannucci (†2012) – vocals (1947–1988)
- Virgilio Savona (†2009) – vocals, piano (1941–1988)
- Enrico De Angelis (†2018) – vocals (1941–1947)

== Discography ==
- 1955 – I successi internazionali del Quartetto Cetra (Cetra, LPA 16)
- 1955 – Lettere dal Sud America (Cetra, LPA 40)
- 1956 – Le canzoni del festival di Sanremo 1956 viste dal Quartetto Cetra (Cetra, LPA 58)
- 1957 – Le canzoni del festival di Sanremo 1957 viste dal Quartetto Cetra (Cetra, LPA 99)
- 1957 – Hot Club per otto (Cetra, LPA 107)
- 1961 – Il Quartetto Cetra alla TV (Dischi Ricordi, MRL 6011)
- 1962 – Quartetto Cetra (Dischi Ricordi, MRL 6014)
- 1962 – Le favole del Juke-Box (Dischi Ricordi) MRL 6024
- 1967 – Ieri oggi (CBS, 62995)
- 1968 – Non cantare, spara (CBS, 63325)
- 1971 – Un LP per te (Carosello Records, CLN 25014)
- 2006 – Il quartetto Cetra (Twilight Music, TWI CD AS 06 28)
- 2009 – Tutto Cetra – Un bacio a mezzanotte (Rhino Records, 5051865-6726-5-4)

== Bibliography ==
- Virgilio Savona, Gli indimenticabili Cetra, Sperling & Kupfer, Milan, 1992
- Matteo Ceschi, Singing What We Were to Know What We Are: The Quartetto Cetra and National History in Italian TV Entertainment, conference paper, London, 2009
