= Lucia Mannucci =

Italian singer (1920–2012)

Lucia Mannucci (18 May 1920 – 7 March 2012) was an Italian singer, best known as one of the singers of Quartetto Cetra, an Italian vocal quartet.

Born in Bologna, Emilia-Romagna, Italy, Mannucci relocated to Milan at a young age. She attended the Art of Movement school directed by Carla Strauss. She successfully auditioned for EIAR, the Italian national radio broadcasting company, and worked as a singer for various radio orchestras. She toured Italy for some years, working with such entertainers as Gorni Kramer, Natalino Otto, and the Quartetto Cetra.

On 19 August 1944, she married Virgilio Savona, one of the singers of the Quartetto Cetra. Three years later, she also joined the quartet, replacing Enrico De Angelis.

Mannucci was the only female member of Quartetto Cetra, but she also had a successful career as a solo singer. Besides working with Quartetto Cetra, Mannucci pursued a solo career as a singer, musical actress, and TV show hostess. She and her husband also did research on folk music.

Mannucci died in March 2012 in Milan, aged 91.
