= Tata Giacobetti =

Singer

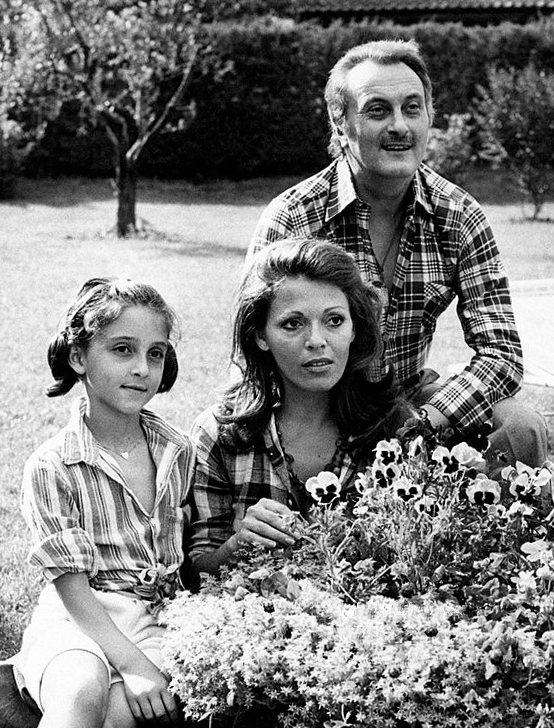
- Tata Giacobetti with wife Valeria Fabrizi and daughter Giorgia Giacobetti in Rome (1970)
- Born: 24 June 1922; Rome, Italy
- Died: 2 December 1988 (aged 66); Rome, Italy
- Occupation: Singer-songwriter
- Spouse: Valeria Fabrizi (m. 1964)

Giovanni "Tata" Giacobetti (24 June 1922 – 2 December 1988) was an Italian singer and jazz musician. He is mostly known for being a member of the vocal quartet Quartetto Cetra.

== Biography ==
Giacobetti was a self-taught musician. He learned to play bass and piano. He started singing at students' parties when he studied scenography at Accademia di Belle Arti di Roma. In 1940–41 he co-founded a vocal quartet called Quartetto Egie, which changed line-up and name twice, becoming Quartetto Ritmo first and then Quartetto Cetra.

As part of Quartetto Cetra, Giacobetti's show business career lasted for over forty years. He was singer and actor for radio, stage, TV, cinema and advertising.

Besides singing, he was the group's main lyricist, often writing together with Virgilio Savona, who composed the music. Their collaboration resulted in hundreds of songs which went to form Quartetto Cetra's vast repertoire.

Tata Giacobetti also wrote lyrics for other Italian musicians, including Gorni Kramer, Giovanni D'Anzi, and Armando Trovajoli.

In 1964 Giacobetti married Valeria Fabrizi, an Italian actress, singer and television personality. They had a daughter Giorgia Giacobetti.

Giacobetti died in December 1988, a few months after Quartetto Cetra's final performance in Bologna.
