= Dyneley Hussey =

English war poet, journalist, art critic and music critic (1893 - 1972)

Dyneley Hussey (27 February 1893 – 6 September 1972) was an English war poet, journalist, art critic and music critic.

== Life ==
Hussey was born in Deolali, India, the son of Colonel Charles Edward Hussey. He was educated at St Cyprian's School Eastbourne, The King's School Canterbury and Corpus Christi College, Oxford. He served in World War I as a lieutenant in the Thirteenth Battalion of the Lancashire Fusiliers, and published a book of war poems. Two of his most celebrated war poems are "An Oxford Retrospect" and "Courage". He then spent five years in the finance department at the Admiralty.

After his time as a civil servant Hussey worked at the National Gallery and began to establish himself as an author and journalist. He was writing art criticism by 1923. However his main interest was music, especially Italian opera. He was music critic for The Times from 1923 to 1946 and also wrote successively for the Saturday Review, Weekend Review, and the Spectator. During World War II he again took on an administrative post at the Admiralty. In 1946, he was chosen to deal with music on the BBC Third Programme and became music critic of The Listener, remaining until 1960. He wrote several articles for the Musical Times under the title "The Musician's Gramophone".

His Master Musicians series book on Verdi was published in 1940, inspired by the revival of critical interest in the composer that had surfaced largely in Germany during the 1930s. It was for many years considered the standard biography in English and lasted for five editions. But many of Verdi's 26 operas were not yet in currency when it was first written. Subsequently, the book was heavily weighted towards Verdi's later operas from Aida onwards.

Hussey married Irene Duncan in 1926 and had a son and two daughters. She died in 1941 and he subsequently married Dr. Florence Costello. He died at Cheltenham aged 79.

== Works ==
- Fleur de Lys (war poems)
- Eurydice: Or, The Nature of Opera
- Introduction to George Clausen, edited by Albert Rutherston (1923)
- Wolfgang Amadeus Mozart (1928)
- Verdi (Master Musicians series, first edition 1940, last revised 1974 by Charles Osborne)
- Verdi (Novello's Biographies of Great Musicians series, 14-page booklet)
- Some Composers of Opera (1952)
