= Enrico De Angelis =

Italian singer and entrepreneur (1920–2018)

- Born: 23 November 1920; Rome, Italy
- Died: 21 August 2018 (aged 97) Milan, Italy
- Genres: Jazz
- Occupations: Singer; pharmaceutical entrepreneur
- Instrument: Vocals
- Years active: 1940–1947, 2004
- Formerly of: Quartetto Cetra

Enrico De Angelis (23 November 1920 – 21 August 2018) was an Italian singer and entrepreneur. His singing career took place during the 1940s.

== Biography ==
De Angelis was part of a family of voice actors and dubbers. He was the oldest son of voice actor Gualtiero De Angelis. In 1940, he founded a vocal quartet named Quartetto Egie together with Tata Giacobetti, Iacopo Jacomelli and Enrico Gentile. They made their debut on 27 May 1940, at the Valle Theatre in Rome. They performed the song Bambina dall'abito blu ("little girl in a blue dress"). In a year's time, the quartet changed line-up and name twice, becoming Quartetto Ritmo first and then Quartetto Cetra.

In October 1947, Enrico De Angelis left Quartetto Cetra to join the Army. He was replaced by Lucia Mannucci, a singer and the wife of Virgilio Savona. He later went on to work as a pharmaceutical entrepreneur.

In 2000, together with Virgilio Savona, he edited a CD with the first recordings of the Quartetto Cetra, part of the collection Frusciati con brio , released in 2001.

== Death ==
De Angelis died of an illness in Milan on 21 August 2018, at the age of 97.
